= List of acronyms: C =

This list contains acronyms, initialisms, and pseudo-blends that begin with the letter C.

For the purposes of this list:

- acronym = an abbreviation pronounced as if it were a word, e.g., SARS = severe acute respiratory syndrome, pronounced to rhyme with cars
- initialism = an abbreviation pronounced wholly or partly using the names of its constituent letters, e.g., CD = compact disc, pronounced cee dee
- pseudo-blend = an abbreviation whose extra or omitted letters mean that it cannot stand as a true acronym, initialism, or portmanteau (a word formed by combining two or more words).

(a) = acronym, e.g.: SARS – (a) severe acute respiratory syndrome
(i) = initialism, e.g.: CD – (i) compact disc
(p) = pseudo-blend, e.g.: UNIFEM – (p) United Nations Development Fund for Women
(s) = symbol (none of the above, representing and pronounced as something else; for example: MHz – megahertz)

Some terms are spoken as either acronym or initialism, e.g., VoIP, pronounced both as voyp and V-O-I-P.

(Main list of acronyms)

- c – (s) Centi
- C – (s) Carbon – Coulomb – One Hundred (in Roman numerals)

== C0–9 ==
- C2 or C^{2} – (i) Command and Control
- c2c – (s) the British rail company formerly known as LTS Rail
- C2C
  - (p) Coast to Coast Athletic Conference
  - Consumer-To-Consumer electronic commerce
  - Cam-To-Cam internet chat
- C2D or C^{2}D – (i) Intel Core 2 Duo
- C2IEDM or C^{2}IEDM – (i) Command and Control Information Exchange Data Model
- C2IS or C^{2}IS – (i) Command and Control Information System
- C2PC or C^{2}PC – (i) Command and Control Personal Computer
- C2V or C^{2}V – (i) Command and Control Vehicle
- C2W or C^{2}W – (i) Command and Control Warfare
- C3 or C^{3}
  - (i) Colorectal Cancer Condition
  - Command, Control, and Communications
- C3I or C^{3}I – (i) Command, Control, Communications, and Intelligence
- C4 or C^{4} – (i) Command, Control, Communications, and Computers
- C4I or C^{4}I – (i) Command, Control, Communications, Computers, and Intelligence
- C4ISR or C^{4}ISR – (i) Command, Control, Communications, Computers, Intelligence, Surveillance and Reconnaissance

== CA ==
- ca – (s) Catalan language (ISO 639-1 code)
- Ca – (s) Calcium
- CA
  - (s) California (postal symbol)
  - Canada (FIPS 10-4 country code; ISO 3166 digram)
  - Catalonia
  - (i) Civil Affairs
  - Close Armour
  - Cocaine Anonymous
  - Computer Associates
  - Counter-Air
  - Cricket Australia
- CAA
  - (i) Canadian Automobile Association
  - (NORAD) Center for Aerospace Analysis
  - (U.S.) Center for Army Analysis
  - (U.S.) Clean Air Act
  - (U.S. Army) Concepts Analysis Agency
  - Civil Aviation Authority
  - Coastal Athletic Association or its former name of Colonial Athletic Association
- CAAT
  - (i) or (a) Campaign Against Arms Trade
  - Center for Alternatives to Animal Testing
- CAB – Civil Aeronautics Board
- CABB (p/i) – Confederación Argentina de Básquetbol (Spanish, "Argentine Basketball Confederation")
- CAC
  - (i) California Association of Criminalists
  - Chronic Asymptomatic [Disease] Carrier
- CACM
  - (i) Central American Common Market
  - (i) Communications of the ACM
- CAD
  - (s) Canadian dollar (ISO 4217 currency code)
  - (a) Computer-Aided Design
  - Computer-Aided Dispatch
  - Cpplint Anxiety Disorder - (a) Condition suffered by software developers who worry about whether they've left any whitespace on the end of a line
- CADCAM – (a) Computer-Aided Design/Computer-Aided Manufacturing
- CADMID – (a) Concept, Assessment, Demonstration, Manufacture, In service, Disposal (life cycle mnemonic)
- CADPAT – (p) CAnadian Disruptive PATtern
- CADT – Child/Adolescent Day Treatment
- CAE
  - (i) Canadian Aviation Electronics (originally)
  - Certificate in Advanced English
- CAEn – (i/a) Close Action Engagement (constructive simulation)
- CAF
  - (s) Central African Republic (ISO 3166 trigram)
  - (i) Confederation of African Football (or French Confédération Africaine de Football)
- CAFAD – (a) Combined Arms For Air Defence
- CAFDE
  - (a) Canadian Association of Film Distributors and Exporters
  - Computer Aided Federation Development Environment
- CAFE – (a) Corporate Average Fuel Economy standard
- CAI – (i) Computer Assisted Instruction
- CAIR – (i) Council on American-Islamic Relations
- Calabarzon – (p) A region in the Philippines: CAvite, LAguna, BAtangas, Rizal, queZON
- CALL – (a) (U.S.) Center for Army Lessons Learned
- CALM – (p) Communications, Air-interface, Long and Medium range
- CalPERS – (p) California Public Employees' Retirement System
- CalSTRS – (p) California State Teachers' Retirement System
- Caltrans – (p) California Department of Transportation
- CAM
  - (a) Chemical Agent Monitor
  - Complementary and alternative medicine
  - Computer-Aided Manufacturing
  - Crassulacean acid metabolism (type of photosynthesis)
- CAMRA – (p) CAMpaign for Real Ale
- CAN – (s) Canada (ISO 3166 trigram)
- CANA – (a) Convulsive Antidote, Nerve Agent
- CANDU – (p) CANada Deuterium Uranium (nuclear reactor design)
- Canola – (p) Canadian oil, low acid (referring to a specific cultivar of rapeseed bred to have a low erucic acid content)
- CAP
  - (i) Combat Air Patrol
  - Civil Air Patrol
  - Common [Operating/Operational] Air Picture
  - Crisis Action Procedures
  - Common Agricultural Policy (European Union)
- CAPES
  - (p) CAPability Evaluation System
  - (a) Combined Arms Planning and Execution System
- CAPTCHA – Completely Automated Public Turing test to tell Computers and Humans Apart
- CAQ – (i) Coalition Avenir Québec (French, "Coalition for Québec's Future"; political party in that Canadian province)
- CARB (i) – California Air Resources Board
- CARE
  - (a) Citizens' Association for Racial Equality (former New Zealand organisation)
  - (p) Community database on Accidents on the Roads in Europe
  - (a) Cooperative for Aid and Relief Everywhere (originally Cooperative for American Remittances to Europe)
- CARMONETTE – (p) Computerized Monte Carlo Simulation
- CARP – (a) Computed Air Release Point
- CART – (a) Championship Auto Racing Teams (now defunct)
- CAS
  - (i) Chemical Abstracts Service
  - Chief of the Air Staff
  - Close Air Support
- CASA –(a) Civil Aviation Safety Authority
- CASE
  - (a) Cellular ammunition storage equipment
  - Computer-Aided Software Engineering
- CASS – (a) Command Activated Sonobuoy System
- CASTFOREM – (p) Combined Arms and Support Task Force Evaluation Model
- CASTOR – (a) Canadian Automatic Small Telescopes for Orbital Research
- cat – (s) Catalan language (ISO 639-2 code)
- CAT
  - (a) Community Acceptance Testing
  - Computer-Assisted (or Axial) Tomography
- CATK – (p) Counterattack
- CATS – (a) Computer Active Technology Suspension
- CATT – (a/i) Combined Arms Tactical Trainer
- CAV – (p) Cavalry
- CAVE - Citizens Against Virtually Everything
- CAVOK – (p) Ceiling And Visibility OK ("Kav-okay")
- CAW – (i) Canadian Auto Workers (trade union)

== CB ==
- CB
  - (i) Citizens' Band radio
  - (s) Cambodia (FIPS 10-4 country code)
- CBASSE – (a) Commission on Behavioral And Social Sciences and Education ("sea bass")
- CBC
  - (i) Canadian Broadcasting Corporation
  - Christmas Bird Count
  - Cipher-Block Chaining
  - Cornering Brake Control
- CBE
  - (i) Commander of the Order of the British Empire
  - Cab Beside Engine (see truck)
- CBF – (i) Confederação Brasileira de Futebol (Portuguese, "Brazilian Football Confederation")
- CBGB – (i) Country, Blue Grass, and Blues (former New York City nightclub)
- CBLA – (i) Comparative bullet lead analysis
- CBN – CardsApp Brand Number
- CBM – many, including Canadian Baptist Ministries and Commodore Business Machines; see entry
- CBML – (i) Coalition Battle Management Language
- CBOL – (i) Consortium for the Barcode of Life
- CBOT – (i) Chicago Board of Trade
- CBP – (i) (U.S.) Customs and Border Protection
- CBR – (i) Case-Based Reasoning
- CBRE
  - (i) Canadian Brotherhood of Railway Employees
  - Certified broadcast radio engineer (U.S. professional certification)
  - Chemical, Biological, Radiological and Explosive Defence Group (Singapore)
  - Coldwell Banker Richard Ellis
- CBRN – (i) Chemical, Biological, Radiological, or Nuclear (weapon or event)
- CBRNE – (i) Chemical, Biological, Radiological, Nuclear or [high-yield] Explosive (weapon or event)
- CBS
  - (i) Columbia Broadcasting System
  - Corps Battle Simulation
- CBT
  - (i) Cock and Ball Torture
  - (i) Cognitive Behaviour Therapy
  - (i) Closed Beta Test
  - (p) Combat
- CBUS – (i) Columbus, Ohio

== CC ==
- CC – many, including carbon copy; see entry
- CCA – (i) Counter Command Activity
- CCC
  - CCC - (p/i) Coricidin Cough & Cold
- CCC
  - (i) Canterbury Clothing Company
  - Civilian Conservation Corps (U.S., 1930s and 1940s)
  - Corpus Christi College, Oxford
- CCCAA – (p/i) California Community College Athletic Association (usually pronounced "3C-2A")
- CCCP
  - (i) Central Committee of the Communist Party
  - Cyrillic for SSSR (Soyuz Sovetskikh Sotsialisticheskikh Respublik, Russian Союз Советских Социалистических Республик, Union of Soviet Socialist Republics)
- CCD
  - (i) Charge-Coupled Device
  - Confraternity of Christian Doctrine (Catechism)
- CCF – (i) Cartoon Cartoon Fridays
- CCG
  - (i) Canadian Coast Guard
  - Collectible Card Game
- CCGC
  - (i) Canadian Coast Guard Cutter
  - Canadian Coast Guard College
- CCGH – (i) Canadian Coast Guard Hovercraft
- CCGS
  - (i) Canadian Coast Guard Ship
  - Christ Church Grammar School
- CCH – (i) Computer-Controlled Hostile
- CCIF – (p) Comité consultatif international des communications téléphoniques à grande distance (French for International Telephone Consultative Committee, merged with the CCIT in 1956 to form the CCITT)
- CCII
  - (i) Command and Control Information Infrastructure
  - Community Capital Investment Initiative
- CCIR
  - (i) Comité consultatif international pour la radio (French for Consultative Committee on International Radio, became the ITU Radiocommunication Sector, ITU-R, in 1992)
  - commander's critical information requirement
- CCIT – (p) Comité consultatif international télégraphique (French for International Telegraph Consultative Committee, merged with the CCIF in 1956 to form the CCITT)
- CCITT – (p) Comité consultatif international téléphonique et télégraphique (French for International Telegraph and Telephone Consultative Committee, became the ITU Telecommunication Standardization Sector, ITU-T, in 1992)
- CCK
  - (p) Cholecystokinin
  - (s) Cocos (Keeling) Islands (ISO 3166 trigram)
- CCM
  - (i) Canada Cycle & Motor Co. Ltd. (now split into two separate companies bearing the CCM name, one manufacturing bicycles and the other ice hockey equipment)
  - Contemporary Christian music
  - Cape Cod Mall
- CCOC
  - (i) Canadian Children's Opera Chorus
- CCOP – (i) Coalition Common Operating/Operational Picture
- CCP
  - (i) Casualty Collection Point
  - Communications Checkpoint
  - Contingency Communications Package
- CCPA – (i) Consumer Credit Protection Act
- CCR
  - (i) Covenants, conditions, and restrictions (related to real estate, especially in the US)
  - Creedence Clearwater Revival
- CCRAp – (p) Canadian Conservative Reform Alliance party
- CCRP – (i) Command and Control Research Program
- CCRTS – (i) Command and Control Research and Technology Symposium
- CCSCS – (a) Coordinadora de Centrales Sindicales del Cono Sur
- CCSCS – (i) Consultative Committee for Space Data Systems
- CCSIL – (i) Command and Control Simulation Interface Language ("cecil")
- CCSK – (i) Cyclic Code Shift Keying
- CCT – (i) Current Commitments Team
- CCTT – (i) Close Combat Tactical Trainer

== CD ==
- cd – (s) Candela
- Cd – (s) Cadmium
- CD – many, including Compact Disc; see entry
- CD1 – (i) Cluster of Differentiation 1 (a small gene family)
- CDA – (i) UK Centre for Defence Analysis
- CDC
  - (i) Centers for Disease Control and Prevention (originally (U.S.) Communicable Disease Center)
  - Control Data Corporation
  - Cult of the Dead Cow
- CDD – (i) Capabilities Development Document
- CDE – (i) Chemical Defence Equipment
- CDEC – (i) U.S. Combat Development Experimentation Center
- CDF
  - (i) California Department of Forestry [and Fire Protection]
  - Common Data Format
  - (s) Democratic Republic of Congo franc congolais (ISO 4217 currency code)
- CDIAC – (a) Carbon Dioxide Information Analysis Center ("see-dee-ack")
- CDipAF – (i) Certified Diploma in Accounting and Finance
- CDL – (i) Commercial driver's license
- CDM
  - (i) Clean Development Mechanism (Kyoto protocol)
  - Cold Dark Matter (astronomy)
- CDMA – (i) Code Division Multiple Access
- CDMO – (i) Contract Development & Manufacturing Organizations
- CDMSII – (p) Cryogenic Dark Matter Search II
- CDMX – (p) Ciudad de México, the Spanish name of Mexico City
- Cdr – (p) Commander
- CDS
  - (i) Chief of the Defence Staff
  - Credit default swap
- Cdt – (p) Commandant
- CDT – (i) Central Daylight Time (UTC−5 hours)

== CE ==
- ce – (s) Chechen language (ISO 639-1 code)
- Ce – (s) Cerium
- CE – many, including Christian/Common Era (cf. AD); see entry
- CEA – (i) Campaign Effectiveness Analysis
- CECOM – (p) U.S. Army Communications and Electronics Command
- CECOT – (p) Centro de Confinamiento del Terrorismo (Spanish, "Terrorism Confinement Center"), maximum-security prison in El Salvador
- CEDEX – (p) Courrier d'entreprise à distribution exceptionnelle (French, "Company Mail with Exceptional Distribution"; "exceptional" refers to the volume of mail)
- CEGEP – (p) Collège d'enseignement général et professionnel (French, "College of General and Vocational Education")
- CEI – (i) Competitive Enterprise Institute
- CENTCOM – (p) United States Central Command
- CENTO – (a) Central Treaty Organization (Baghdad Pact)
- CENZUB – (p) Centre d'entraînement aux actions en zone urbaine (French, "Urban Operations Training Centre")
- CEO – (i) Chief Executive Officer
- CEP – (i) Circular Error Probable
- CEPT – (a/i) Conférence européenne des administrations des postes et des télécommunications (French, "European Conference of Postal and Telecommunications Administrations")
- CERCLA – (a) U.S. Comprehensive Environmental Response, Compensation, and Liability Act of 1980 (Superfund)
- CERDEC – U.S. Communications-Electronics Research, Development and Engineering Center
- CERGA – (a) Centre de recherches en géodynamique et astrométrie (French, "Astrometry and Geodynamics Research Centre")
- CERN – (a) Centre européen pour la recherche nucléaire (French, "European Organization for Nuclear Research")
- CERT – (a) Computer Emergency Response Team
- ces – (s) Czech language (ISO 639-2 code)
- CESS – (i) Centre for Earth Science Studies (India)
- CEV
  - (i) Combat Engineer Vehicle
  - Confédération européenne de volleyball (French, "European Volleyball Confederation")
  - Crew Exploration Vehicle
- CEWC – (a/i) Council for Education in World Citizenship

== CF ==
- cf. – (i) confer (Latin "compare", or "see also")
- Cf – (s) Californium
- CF
  - (i) Canadian Forces
  - (s) Central African Republic (ISO 3166 digram)
  - (s) Consolidated Freightways
  - Republic of the Congo (FIPS 10-4 country code)
- CFA
  - (i) Cat Fanciers' Association
  - Chartered Financial Analyst
  - College Football Association (former consortium of US major college football conferences)
  - Color Filter Array
  - County Fire Authority
  - Covering Force Area
- CFAR
  - (i) Christine's
  - Federal Acquisition Regulation
- CFC
  - (i) ChloroFluoroCarbon
  - Canadian Fish Company
- CFE – (i) Constitution for the Federation of Earth
- CFES – (a) Continuous Flow Electrophoresis System
- CFFZ – (i) Call For Fire Zone
- CFG
  - (i) Context-free grammar
  - Control-flow graph
- CFHT – (i) Canada–France–Hawaii Telescope
- CFI – (i) Center for Inquiry (CSICOP)
- CFL
  - (i) Canadian Football League
  - Co-ordinated Fire Line
- CFLCC – (i) Coalition Forces Land Component Command
- CFM – (i) Certified Facilities Manager [(IFMA)]http://www.ifma.org/
- CFO – (i) Chief Financial Officer
- CFP
  - (i) Call for papers
  - College Football Playoff
  - Common Fisheries Policy (EU)
- CFR
  - (i) Code of Federal Regulations
  - Căile Ferate Române (Romanian, "Romanian Railways")
- CFRP – (i) Carbon fibre reinforced plastic
- CFS – (i) Chronic Fatigue Syndrome
- CFSP – (i) Common Foreign and Security Policy
- CFU – (i) Colony Forming Unit(s) in Microbiology
- CFV – (i) Cavalry Fighting Vehicle
- CFZ – (i) Critical Friendly Zone

== CG ==
- CG – (i) Client Group – Computer Graphics – Controls Group – (s) Democratic Republic of the Congo (FIPS 10-4 country code) – Republic of the Congo (ISO 3166 digram)
- CGDC – (i) Computer Game Developers Conference (became GDC in 1998)
- CGF – (i) Computer-Generated Forces (Simulation)
- CGH – (i) Comparative Genomic Hybridisation
- CGIG – (i) Cross-Government Implementation Group
- CGM – (i) Computer Graphics Metafile
- CGO – (s) Republic of the Congo (IOC and FIFA trigram, but not ISO 3166)
- CGS – (i) Chief of the General Staff
- CGSI – Consumer Guidance Society of India
- CGT – (i) Capital Gains Tax

== CH ==
- ch – (s) Chamorro language (ISO 639-1 code)
- ch – ch(L) is used to denote the Chern character of a line bundle
- CH
  - (p) Chieftain tank
  - (s) China (FIPS 10-4 country code)
  - Switzerland (ISO 3166 digram; from Latin Confoederatio Helvetica)
- cha – (s) Chamorro language (ISO 639-2 code)
- CHAMPUS – (a) (U.S.) Civilian Health and Medical Program of the Uniformed Services (now known as TRICARE)
- CHAOS – (a) Cambridge Heart Anti-Oxidant Study
- CHAPS – (a) Clearing House Automated Payment System
- CHDK – (i) Canon Hack Development Kit (Canon camera firmware hack)
- che – (s) Chechen language (ISO 639-2 code)
- CHE – (s) Switzerland (ISO 3166 trigram; from Latin Confoederatio Helvetica)
- CHF – (s) Swiss franc (ISO 4217 currency code)
- CHI
  - Catholic Health Initiatives (US hospital network)
  - (s) Chile (IOC and FIFA trigram, but not ISO 3166)
  - (i) Columbia Helicopters, Inc
  - Computer-Human Interaction
- CHiP – (a) California Highway Patrol
- CHIPS – (a) Cosmic Hot Interstellar Plasma Spectrometer
- CHL – (s) Chile (ISO 3166 trigram)
- CHLA – (a) Core Historical Literature of Agriculture
- CHN – (s) China (ISO 3166 trigram)
- CHOGM – (a) Commonwealth Heads of Government Meeting
- CHP
  - (i) California Highway Patrol
  - Combined Heat and Power
- CHPSO – (a) California Hospital Patient Safety Organization
- CHRS – Canadian Heart Rhythm Society
- CHS – (i) Combat Health Support
- CHT – (i) Certified Hand Therapist
- chu – (s) Old Church Slavonic language (ISO 639-2 code)
- chv – (s) Chuvash language (ISO 639-2 code)
- CREN – (p) Christian Real Estate Network Real Estate Association

== CI ==
- Ci – (s) Curie
- CI
  - (s) Chile (FIPS 10-4 country code)
  - Côte d'Ivoire (ISO 3166 digram)
  - (i) Counter-Intelligence
  - 101 (in Roman numerals)
- CIA
  - (i) Cairo International Airport
  - Central Intelligence Agency
  - Cru' in Action
  - Culinary Institute of America
- CIAO
  - (i) Critical Infrastructure Assurance Office
  - Component-Integrated ACE ORB
- CIB – (i) Complete In Box (Internet auction/trading listings)
- CIBC – (i) Canadian Imperial Bank of Commerce
- CICS – (a) Customer Information Control System (IBM mainframe software; "kicks" or "C-I-C-S")
- CID
  - (i) Certified Interior Designer (New York State professional licensing designation)
  - (p) Combat Identification
  - (i) Criminal Investigation Division
  - Criminal Investigations Department
- CIÉ – (i) Commission internationale de l'éclairage
- CIEF – (i) Comité international d'enregistrement des fréquences (International Frequency Registration Board)
- CIF
  - (i) California Interscholastic Federation (high school sports governing body)
  - Cost, Insurance, and Freight (Paid) (shipping)
- CIMIC – (p) Civil-Military Co-operation
- CIMMYT – (a/i) Centro Internacional de Mejoramiento de Maíz Y Trigo (Spanish, "International Maize and Wheat Improvement Center")
- CINC – (p) Commander in Chief
- CINEOS – (a) Campo Imperatore Near-Earth Object Survey
- CIO
  - (i) Chief information officer
  - Congress of Industrial Organizations
- CIP – (a) Combat Identification Panel
- CIPE – (i) (European) Centre for International Political Economy
- CIR – (i) (Commander's) Critical Information Requirements
- CIR – (s) Corotating Interaction Region
- CIS
  - (i) Canadian Interuniversity Sport, a former name of the organization now known as U Sports
  - Commonwealth of Independent States
  - Command and Information System
  - Communication and Information System
- CISA – (a) (U.S.) C4I Integration Support Activity
- CISB – (i) Complete In Sealed Box (Internet auction/trading listings)
- CISPR – (i) Comité international spécial des perturbations radioélectriques (Special International Committee on Radio Interference)
- CISSP – (i) Certified Information Systems Security Professional
- CITES – (p) Convention on International Trade in Endangered Species (of Wild Fauna and Flora) ("sigh-tease")
- CITS – (i) Combat Identification Training System
- CIV – (s) Côte d'Ivoire (ISO 3166 trigram)
- CIVETS – (a) Colombia, Indonesia, Vietnam, Egypt, Turkey, South Africa (economics)
- CIVPOP – (p) Civilian Population
- CIWS – (i) Close-In Weapon System

== CJ ==
- CJ
  - (s) Cayman Islands (FIPS 10-4 country code)
  - (i) Criminal Justice
- CJC
  - (i) Canadian Jewish Congress
  - Cold Junction Compensation
- CJD
  - (i) Chronological Julian Day
  - Creutzfeldt–Jakob disease
- CJCS – (i) Chairman of the Joint Chiefs of Staff
- CJO – (i) Chief of Joint Operations
- CJTF – (i) Combined Joint Task Force

== CK ==
- CK
  - (s) Cocos (Keeling) Islands (FIPS 10-4 country code)
  - (s) Cook Islands (ISO 3166 code)
- CKA - (i) Commonly known as
- CKND – (i) Codename: Kids Next Door

== CL ==
- Cl – (s) Chlorine
- CL – (s) Chile (ISO 3166 digram) – (i) Co-ordination Line – One Hundred and Fifty (in Roman numerals)
- CLA – (i) Clutterers Anonymous
- CLEC – (i) Competitive Local Exchange Carrier
- CLEMARS – (a) California Law Enforcement Mutual Aid Radio System
- CLI – (i) Command Line Interface/Interpreter
- CLIC – (p) Compact LInear Collider
- CLO – (i) Cornell Lab of Ornithology
- CLOB – (p) Character Large OBject
- CLOS – (i) Command to Line-Of-Sight (missile control system)
- CLOS – (a) Common Lisp Object System
- CLP – (s) Chilean peso (ISO 4217 currency code) – (i) Common [Operating/Operational] Land Picture
- CLPFC – (i) CentroLateral PreFrontal Cortex
- CLRP – (a) College Loan Repayment Program

== CM ==
- Cm – (s) Curium
- CM
  - (s) Cameroon (FIPS 10-4 country code; ISO 3166 digram)
  - (i) Cruise Missile
  - (s) Nine Hundred (in Roman numerals)
- CMA
  - (i) U.S. Chemical Materials Agency
  - Country Music Association (also used to refer to the organization's annual awards)
  - Crystal Meth Anonymous
- CMB – (i) Cosmic Microwave Background
- CMBR – (i) Cosmic Microwave Background Radiation
- CME – (a) Coronal Mass Ejection (usually Sun)
- CMHC – (i) Canada Mortgage and Housing Corporation
- CMIIAW – (i) Correct me if I am wrong
- CMIS
  - (a) Content Management Interoperability Services
  - Common management information service
- CMJ – (i) Christopher Martin-Jenkins (BBC sports commentator)
- CML
  - (p) Chemical
  - (i) Chronic Myelogenous Leukemia (formerly Chronic Myeloid Leukemia)
- CMLL – (i) Consejo Mundial de Lucha Libre (Spanish, "World Wrestling Council"—Mexican professional wrestling promotion)
- CMM – (i) Capability Maturity Model
- CMMC – (i) Corps Materiel Management Centre
- CMML
  - (i) Chronic MyeloMonocytic Leukemia
  - Continuous Media Markup Language
- CMO – (i) Civil-Military Operations
- CMOC – (i) Civil-Military Operations Centre
- CMOS
  - (i) Canadian Meteorological and Oceanographic Society
  - (The) Chicago Manual of Style
  - Complementary Metal Oxide Semiconductor
- CMP – (i) Common [Operating/Operational] Maritime Picture
- CMP – (i) Canadian Military Pattern truck (World War II)
- CMPD
  - (i) Chronic Myeloproliferative Disease
  - (i) Charlotte-Mecklenburg Police Department
  - (i) Costa Mesa Police Department
- CMR
  - (s) Cameroon (ISO 3166 trigram)
  - (i) Coaxial Main Rotors (helicopter type)
- CMS
  - (i) Centers for Medicare and Medicaid Services
  - The Chicago Manual of Style
- CMT – (i) Country Music Television
- CMU
  - (i) Carnegie Mellon University
  - Central Michigan University
  - Concrete Masonry Unit
- CMW
  - (i) Marconi's Wireless Telegraph Company of Canada
  - Canadian Manufacturing Week
  - Canadian Music Week
  - Catherine McAuley Westmead (school in New South Wales, Australia)
  - Chicago, Missouri and Western (Railway)
  - Compartmented Mode Workstation
  - Compton's Most Wanted
  - Continuous Microwave (processing technology)
  - Custom Maintenance Wizard (Microsoft Office Resource Kit)
- CMYK – (i) Cyan Magenta Yellow Key/blacK (color model)

== CN ==
- CN
  - (i/s) Canadian National (railway; also the AAR reporting mark for said company)
  - (s) China (ISO 3166 digram)
  - Comoros (FIPS 10-4 country code)
- CNA
  - (i) Center for Naval Analyses
  - Certified Network Administrator
  - Computer Network Attack
  - Continental (Casualty Company), National (Fire Insurance Company), and American (Casualty Company), the three companies that merged to form what is now known as CNA Financial
- CNBC – (a/i) Consumer News and Business Channel
- CND
  - (i) Campaign for Nuclear Disarmament
  - Computer Network Defence
- CNE
  - (i) Canadian National Exhibition
  - Computer Network Exploitation
  - Certified Network Engineer
- CNES – (i) Centre national d'études spatiales (French, "National Centre for Space Studies")
- CNF – (p) Cost and Freight
- CNI – (i) Communications, Navigation and Identification
- CNI – (a) Clinical Nursing Intern
- CNN
  - (i) Cable News Network
  - Cellular Nonlinear Network
- CNO – (i) Computer Network Operations
- CNR
  - (i) Canadian National Railway
  - Combat Net Radio
- CNV – (i) Copy-Number Variable (genetics)
- CNY – (s) Chinese yuan renminbi (ISO 4217 currency code)

== CO ==
- c/o – (i) care of (postal code indicating temporary address change)
- co – (s) Corsican language (ISO 639-1 code)
- Co – (s) Cobalt
- Co. – Company
- CO – many, including Central Office (phone company); see entry – (s) Colorado (postal symbol) – (i) Commanding Officer (military)
- COA – (i) Certificate/Concept Of Analysis – Course Of Action (military)
- COB – (i) Close Of Business [day]
- COBOL (p) – COmmon Business-Oriented Language
- COBRA – Consolidated Omnibus Budget Reconciliation Act of 1985
- COCOM – (p) Combatant Command (military)
- COD – (i) Cash On Delivery – (s) Democratic Republic of the Congo (ISO 3166 trigram)
- CoDA – (i) Co-Dependents Anonymous
- codec – (p) Coder-Decoder / Compressor-Decompressor / Compression-Decompression algorithm
- COE – (i) Cab Over Engine (see truck) – Common Operating Environment (military)
- COEA – (i) Cost Operational Effectiveness Analysis (military)
- COEIA – (i) Combined Operational Effectiveness and Investment Appraisal (military)
- C of I – (i) Certificate of Indebtedness (financial) – (i) The College of Idaho
- COFT – (i) Conduct Of Fire Trainer (military)
- COG – (i) Centre Of Gravity – Current Operations Group (military) – (s) Republic of the Congo (ISO 3166 trigram)
- COGENT – (a) Cognitive Objects within a Graphical EnviroNmenT
- COIL – (a) Chemical Oxygen Iodine Laser
- COIN – (p) Counter-Insurgency (military)
- COK – (s) Cook Islands (ISO 3166 trigram)
- COL
  - (s) Colombia (ISO 3166 trigram)
  - (i) Cost of Living
- COLA – (a) comp.os.linux.announce – Cost Of Living Adjustment
- COLT – (a) Combat Observation and Lasing Team (military)
- COM – (s) Comoros (ISO 3166 trigram) – (a) Component Object Model
- COMECON – (p) Council for Mutual Economic Assistance (economic counterpart of the Warsaw Pact, 1949–1991)
- COMLEX-USA – (p/a) Comprehensive Osteopathic Medical Licensing Examination of the United States (of America); "COMLEX" typically pronounced as a single word, with "USA" spelled out
- COMMZ – (p) Communications Zone (military)
- COMSEC – (p) Communications Security (military)
- CONAD – (p) U.S. Continental Air Defense Command
- CONCACAF – (a) Confederation Of North, Central American and Caribbean Association Football
- CONMEBOL – (p) Confederación Sudamericana de Fútbol or Confederação Sul-Americana de Futebol (respectively Spanish and Portuguese for "South American Football Confederation")
- CONOPS – (p) Concept of Operations (military)
- CONUS – (p) Continental United States
- COO – (i) Chief Operating Officer
- COP – (s) Colombian peso (ISO 4217 currency code) – (a) Common Operating/Operational Picture
- COPD –(i) Chronic obstructive pulmonary disease
- COPE – (a) U.K. Committee On Publication Ethics
- COPUS – (p) U.K. Committee on the Public Understanding of Science
- cor – (s) Cornish language (ISO 639-2 code)
- CORBA – (a) Common Object Request Broker Architecture
- CORD – (i/a) Common Operational Requirements Document
- CORE – (a) Consortium for Oceanographic Research and Education
- CORG – (i) (U.S.) Combat Operations Research Group
- COROT – (p) COnvection, ROtation and planetary Transits
- cos – (s) Corsican language (ISO 639-2 code) – Cosine
- COS – (i) Cooper Ornithological Society
- COSCOM – (p) Corps Support Command (military)
- COSER – (p) COoperative SERvice
- COSHH – (p) Control Of Substances Hazardous to Health (United Kingdom)
- CoSIDA – (p) College Sports Information Directors of America, the original name of the organization now known as College Sports Communicators
- CoT – (i) Car of Tomorrow (former NASCAR race car design)
- COTS – (a) Commercial Off The Shelf
- COVID-19 – Coronavirus disease 2019
- Coy – (s) Company (military unit)Cow

== CP ==
- CP
  - (i) Canadian Pacific
  - Check Point
  - Command Post
  - Club Penguin
- CPA – (i) Certified Public Accountant
- CPAC
  - (p) Conservative Political Action Conference
  - Cable Public Affairs Channel ("see-pack")
- CPAP
  - (i) Center for Public Administration and Policy
  - Coalition for the Prevention of Alcohol Problems
  - Consecutive primes in arithmetic progression
  - (p) Continuous positive airway pressure ("see-pap")
- CPC – Certified Professional Coder, a certification from AAPC
- CPCU – Certified Property Casualty Underwriter
- CPD – (i) Capabilities Production Document
- CPE
  - (i) Certificate of Proficiency in English
  - Certified Professional Ergonomist
  - (i) Clinical Pastoral Education
- CPEC – (p) China–Pakistan Economic Corridor ("see-pec")
- CPF
  - (i) Calibration Parameter File
  - Canadian Patrol Frigate
- CPG – (a) Clinical Practice Guideline
- CPI – (i) CERDEC Command, Power and Integration
- CPIM – (a) Certification on Production and Inventory Management
- CPIR – Computationally-Private Information Retrieval
- CPON – (i) Certified Pediatric Oncology Nurse
- CPPCC – (i) Chinese People's Political Consultative Conference
- CPR
  - (i) Canadian Pacific Railway
  - (i) Cardiopulmonary resuscitation
- CPS
  - Crown Prosecution Service (UK government agency)
  - Child Protection Service (Collection of US government agencies)
- CPSM – (i) Continuous Phase Shift Modulation
- CPSU – (i) Communist Party of the Soviet Union
- CPT – (i) Contingency Planning Team
- CPU
  - (i) Central Processing Unit
  - Contract Postal Unit
- CPV – (s) Cape Verde (ISO 3166 trigram)
- CPX – (p) Command Post eXercise

== CQ ==
- CQ – (i) Carrier Qualification – Central Queensland – Charge of Quarters – Congressional Quarterly – Constellation Airlines (IATA airline designator) – Northern Mariana Islands (FIPS 10-4 territory code)
- CQD – (i) Close Quarters Drill (Morse distress code preceding SOS: CQ "calling all stations", D "Distress"; often incorrectly interpreted as "Come Quick, Distress")

== CR ==
- cr – (s) Cree language (ISO 639-1 code)
- Cr – (s) Chromium
- CR
  - (s) Coral Sea Islands (FIPS 10-4 territory code)
  - Costa Rica (ISO 3166 digram)
- CRAM – (i) Combined Radiometric Correction Model
- [C.R.A.P. (acronym) Citizens Raging Against Phones] Group of people on GTA III (PS2)]
- CRC
  - (i) Central RTI Component
  - Chemical Rubber Company
  - Christian Reformed Church
  - Control and Reporting Centre
  - Cyclic Redundancy Check
  - (s) Costa Rican colón (ISO 4217 currency code)
  - Costa Rica (IOC and FIFA trigram, but not ISO 3166)
- CRD – (i) Capstone Requirements Document
- cre – (s) Cree language (ISO 639-2 code)
- C.R.E.A.M. –Cash Rules Everything Around Me
- CREB – (a) Cyclic AMP-response Element Binding (protein)
- CREEP – (a) Committee for the Re-Election of the President, a pejorative nickname used by opponents
- CRI
  - (a) China Radio International
  - (s) Costa Rica (ISO 3166 trigram)
- CRIPL – (i) Consolidated Remain-In-Place List
- CRISPR – (a) clustered regularly interspaced short palindromic repeats
- CRM – (i) Cardiac Rhythm Management – Customer Relationship Management
- CRO – (s) Croatia (IOC and FIFA trigram, but not ISO 3166) – Contract Research Organization
- CRP
  - (i) Committee for the Re-Election of the President
  - Control and Reporting Post
- CRT
  - (i) Cardiac Resynchronization Therapy
  - Cathode-Ray Tube
  - Chinese Remainder Theorem
- CRTC – (i) Canadian Radio-television and Telecommunications Commission
- [CWAJGA? (disambiguation) Can't We All Just Get Along?] Used in the 90s & early 2000s to resolve or stop arguments and disagreements between people

== CS ==
- cs – (s) Czech language (ISO 639-1 code)
- Cs – (s) Caesium
- CS
  - (i) Combat Support
  - Computer Scientist
  - Counter-Strike
  - (s) Costa Rica (FIPS 10-4 country code)
  - Serbia and Montenegro (ISO 3166 digram; obsolete since 2006)
- CSA
  - (i) Canadian Soccer Association
  - Canadian Space Agency
  - Canadian Standards Association
  - Chief Scientific Advisor
  - Child Support Agency
  - Command Staff Advisor
  - Community-supported agriculture
  - Confederate States of America
  - Corps Storage Area
  - (p) Czech Airlines
- C/S/A – (i) CINC, Service, and Agency
- CSAR – (p) Combat Search and Rescue ("seessar")
- CSC
  - (i) Closed Spacelike Curve (relativity)
  - College Sports Communicators (U.S. organization for college sports information directors)
  - Compact system camera
  - Computer Sciences Corporation (became DXC Technology in 2017)
  - Computer Security Centre
- CSCC - Canadian Society of Clinical Chemists
- CSEAL – (i/a) Combat Systems Engineering and Analysis Laboratory ("see-seal")
- CSERIAC – (p) (U.S. DoD) Crew Systems Ergonomics Information Analysis Center
- CSG – (i) Corps Support Group
- CSI – see entry
- CSICOP – (i) Committee for the Scientific Investigation of Claims of the Paranormal (became the Committee for Skeptical Inquiry in 2006)
- CSIP – (i) Commercial Stable Image Platform (AMD)
- CSIS
  - (p) Canadian Security Intelligence Service ("seessiss")
  - (i) (U.S.) Center for Strategic & International Studies
- CSK – (s) Czechoslovakia (ISO 3166 trigram; obsolete since 1993)
- CSL – (i) U.K. Central Science Laboratory
- CSM – see entry
- C-SPAN – (i) Cable-Satellite Public Affairs Network
- CSPI – (i) Center for Science in the Public Interest
- CSR – (i) Control Supply Rate
- CSR – (i) Corporate Social Responsibility
- CSRC – (i) Conflict Studies Research Centre
- CSRF – (i) Cross-Site Request Forgery
- CSS
  - (i) Cascading Style Sheets
  - Catalina Sky Survey
  - Central Security Service
  - Combat Service Support
  - Confederate States Ship
  - Content Scramble System
  - Cross-site scripting
- CSSCS – (i) Combat Service Support Control System
- CST – (i) Central Standard Time (UTC−6 hours)
- CSUN – (p) California State University, Northridge (pronounced "C-sun")

== CT ==
- CT – (i) Computed tomography (medical scan also known as a CAT scan) – Central Time zone – Chrono Trigger (Computer/Video games) – (s) Connecticut (postal symbol) – Canterbury (postal symbol) – Chhattisgarh (Indian state code)
- CTA
  - (s) Central African Republic (FIFA trigram, but not ISO 3166 or IOC)
  - (i) Chicago Transit Authority
  - (i) Comando-Geral de Tecnologia Aerospacial (Portuguese, [Brazilian] "General Command for Aerospace Technology")
- CTBT – (i) Comprehensive [Nuclear] Test Ban Treaty
- CTC – (i) Closed Timelike Curve (relativity) – (U.S.) Combat Training Center
- CTDB – (i) Compact Terrain Data Base (file format)
- CTE
  - (s) Canton and Enderbury Islands (ISO 3166 trigram; obsolete 1984)
  - (i) Chronic traumatic encephalopathy
- CTGF – (i) connective tissue growth factor
- CTI – (i) Co-operative Target Identification
- CTIL – (i) Critical Tracked Items List
- CTIS – (i) Central Tire Inflation System
- CTMS – (i) Clinical Trial Management System
- CTO – (i) Chief Technical Officer – Chief Technology Officer
- CTS – (i) Clear-To-Send – Collective Training Standards – Communications Technology Service – Contract Technical Services – Conversation Time Sharing – COSMIC Top Secret
- CTSS – (i) Compatible Time-Sharing System
- CTU – (i) Counter Terrorist Unit (fictional branch of the Central Intelligence Agency in the television action series 24)
- CTVT – (i) Canine Transmissible Venereal Tumour

== CU ==
- cu – (s) Old Church Slavonic language (ISO 639-1 code)
- Cu – (s) Copper (Latin Cuprum)
- CU
  - (i) Carrie Underwood
  - (s) Cuba (FIPS 10-4 country code; ISO 3166 digram)
  - (i) University of Colorado Boulder
- CUB – (s) Cuba (ISO 3166 trigram)
- CUCV – (i) Commercial Utility Cargo Vehicle
- CUDAAP –(a) Custom Database Applications
- CUNY – (a) City University of New York ("CUE-knee")
- CUP – (s) Cuban peso (ISO 4217 currency code)
- CUPE – (a) Canadian Union of Public Employees ("CUE-pee")
- CUPS – (a) Common Unix Printing System
- CUPW – (i) Canadian Union of Postal Workers
- CUREA – (a) Consortium for Undergraduate Research and Education in Astronomy
- CuW – (s) Copper-tungsten pseudo-alloy (from the chemical symbols of the two component elements)
- CUW – (s) Curaçao (ISO 3166 trigram)

== CV ==
- cv – (s) Chuvash language (ISO 639-1 code)
- CV – many, including curriculum vitae (résumé); see entry
- CVCC
  - (i) Combat Vehicle Command and Control
  - Compound Vortex Controlled Combustion (1970s Honda automobile engine technology)
- CVE – (s) Cape Verde escudo (ISO 4217 currency code)
- CVI – (i) Combat Vehicle Identification
- CVLL – (i) Crypto Variable Logic Label
- CVR – (i) Cockpit Voice Recorder – Combat Vehicle Reconnaissance
- CVR(T) – (i) Combat Vehicle Reconnaissance (Tracked)
- CVS – (i) Concurrent Versions System
- CVSD – (i) Continuous Variable Slope Delta (modulation)
- CVT – (i) Continuously Variable Transmission

== CW ==
- CW
  - (i) Continuous Wave
  - (s) Cook Islands (FIPS 10-4 territory code)
  - (i) Clothes washer
  - (i) The CW
- CW/CE – (i) Construction Worker / Construction Electrician IBEW
- CWC – (i) Chemical Weapons Convention
- CWL – (i) Campus Wide Login
- CWS – (i) Canadian Wildlife Service
- CWRU – (i) Case Western Reserve University

== CX ==
- CX – (s) Christmas Island (ISO 3166 digram) – One Hundred and Ten (in Roman numerals)
- CXR
  - (s) Christmas Island (ISO 3166 trigram)
  - (s) IATA code for Cam Ranh International Airport

== CY ==
- cy – (s) Welsh language (ISO 639-1 code)
- CY – (i) Calendar year – (s) Cyprus (ISO 3166 and FIPS 10-4 country code digram)
- cym – (s) Welsh language (ISO 639-2 code)
- CYM – (s) Cayman Islands (ISO 3166 trigram)
- CYP – (s) Cyprus (ISO 3166 trigram) – Cyprus pound (ISO 4217 currency code)

== CZ ==
- CZ
  - (i) combat zone
  - (s) Czech Republic (ISO 3166 and FIPS 10-4 country code digram)
- CZE – (s) Czech Republic (ISO 3166 trigram)
- CZK – (s) Czech koruna (ISO 4217 currency code)
- CZF – constructive Zermelo-Fraenkel
- CZMA – (i) (US) Coastal Zone Management Act
- CZW – (i) Combat Zone Wrestling
