= CKA =

CKA may refer to:

- Atlantic Croaker, an FAO fish species code
- Chief Kitsap Academy
- Kegelman Air Force Auxiliary Field, United States, an IATA airport code
- Council of Korean Americans
- Commonly known as, a common name
