= CCOC =

CCOC may refer to any of the following:

- Canadian Children's Opera Chorus
- Cork College of Commerce
- Cardinal characteristics of the continuum

== See also ==
List of acronyms: C
