= CFAR =

CFAR may refer to:

- Center for Applied Rationality
- Centre for Freudian Analysis and Research
- Collaborative Forecasting and Replenishment
- Constant false alarm rate
- CFAR (AM), a radio station (590 AM) licensed to Flin Flon, Manitoba, Canada
