= CVE =

CVE may refer to:

== Transportation ==
- CVE, the ICAO airline designator for Cabo Verde Express
- CVE, a U.S. Navy designation for escort aircraft carriers
- Commercial vehicle enforcement, another name for commercial vehicle inspection

== Computing ==
- Collaborative virtual environment, a computer-simulated method of interaction
- Common Vulnerabilities and Exposures, a collection of publicly known software vulnerabilities

== Finance ==
- CVE, the ISO 4217 currency code for the Cape Verdean escudo
- CVE, the ticker symbol for Cenovus Energy on the Toronto and New York stock exchanges
- Canadian Venture Exchange, a stock exchange

== Other uses ==
- Countering Violent Extremism Task Force, a U.S. government program
