= CREN =

The acronym CREN may refer to:

- Christian Real Estate Network, a private real estate association
- Club de Radioexperimentadores de Nicaragua, an amateur radio organization in Nicaragua
- Corporation for Research and Educational Networking, organizational home for the computer networks Bitnet and later CSNET
