= CBOT =

CBOT may refer to:

- CBOT-DT, a television station (channel 4.1, digital UHF 25) licensed to serve Ottawa, Ontario, Canada
- CBot (programming language), a programming language, used in Colobot games
- Chicago Board of Trade, futures and options exchange in Chicago, Illinois, USA
