= COPUS =

COPUS or Copus may stand for:

== People ==
- Julia Copus (born 1969), British poet, radio dramatist and children's writer
- Nick Copus – British cinematographer, director, producer and writer
- Libby Copus-Brown – Australian soccer player

== Other ==
- Committee on the Public Understanding of Science, UK organisation
- Coalition on the Public Understanding of Science, US organisation
- COPUS (band), a rap jazz fusion ensemble
- Copus massacre – Massacre during the war of 1812
