= CBRE =

CBRE can refer to:

- Canadian Brotherhood of Railway Employees, a railway trade union in Canada
- Chemical, Biological, Radiological and Explosive Defence Group, a counter-terrorism unit in Singapore
- CBRE Group, a multinational real estate corporation
- Certified broadcast radio engineer, a professional title regulated by The Society of Broadcast Engineers
