= CSAR =

CSAR, or Csar may refer to:

- Caris Spatial Archive, a file format for storing bathymetry data
- Center for the Simulation of Advanced Rockets
- Central South African Railways
- Combat search and rescue
- Cosa succederà alla ragazza, a 1992 music album by Lucio Battisti
- Comité secret d'action révolutionnaire, a French anti-communist group better known as La Cagoule
- Alternative spelling of the title of nobility, Tsar
- Günther Csar (born 1966)
- Child Sexual Abuse Regulation (Regulation to Prevent and Combat Child Sexual Abuse)
