= CCTT =

CCTT may refer to:

- The Cable Company of Trinidad and Tobago
- The Canadian Council of Technicians and Technologists
- International Coordinating Council on Trans-Eurasian Transportation
- City Centre Transit Terminal in Mississauga, Ontario
