= Centre d'entraînement aux actions en zone urbaine =

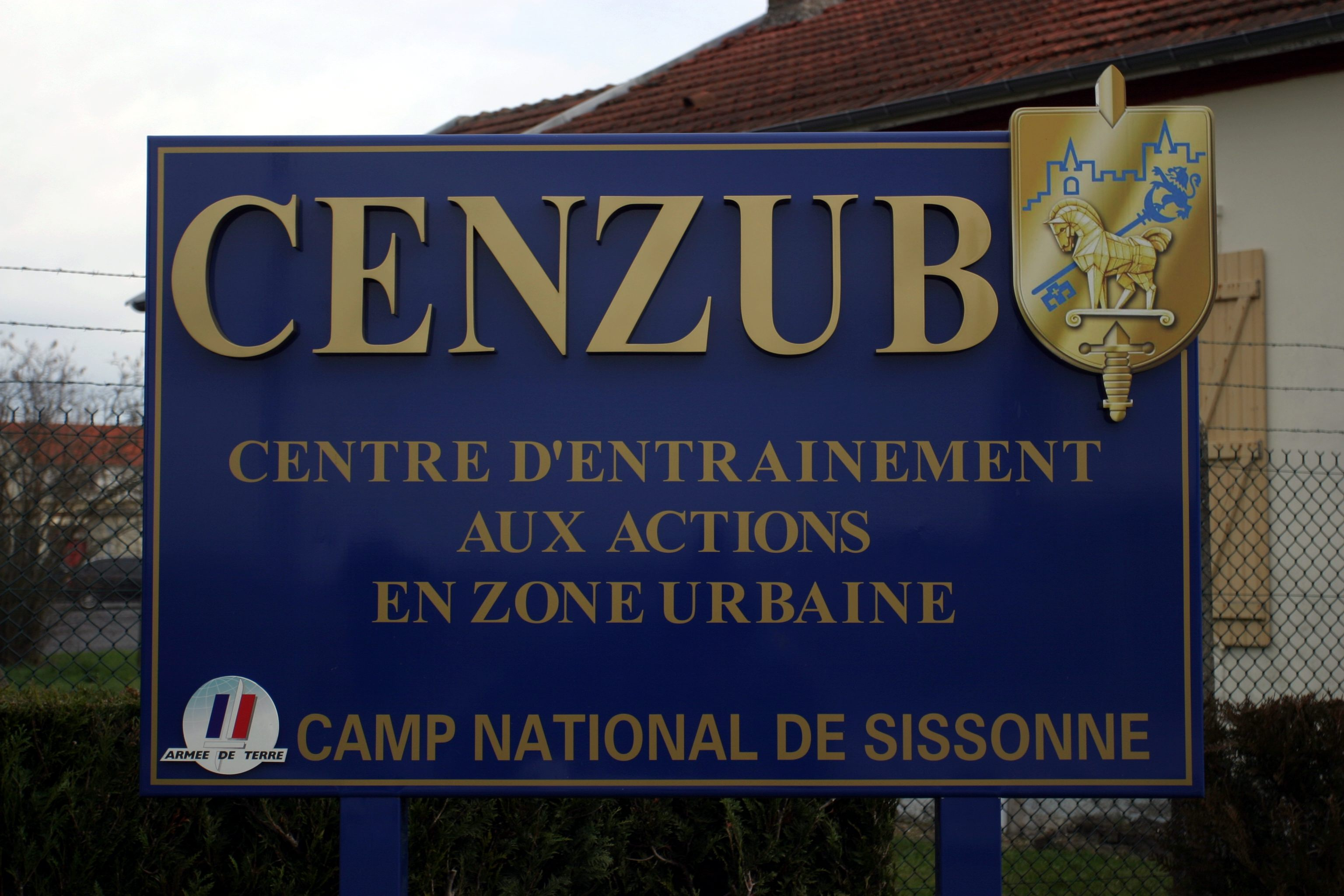
CENZUB

The Centre d’entrainement aux actions en zone urbaine (Urban Zone Combat Training Center) (CENZUB) is a purpose-built facility for training French armed forces in urban warfare skills. It is located at Sissonne in north-eastern France. It is the largest training area of its type in Europe. There are two constructed districts - Beausejour and Jeoffrecourt.

British Army units have used the facility while learning French urban tactics and using French equipment. This part of a wider programme for Anglo-French military cooperation following the Defence and Security Co-operation Treaty signed by British Prime Minister David Cameron and French President Nicolas Sarkozy in November 2010.

== Facilities ==
CENZUB offers several varied urban training environments:

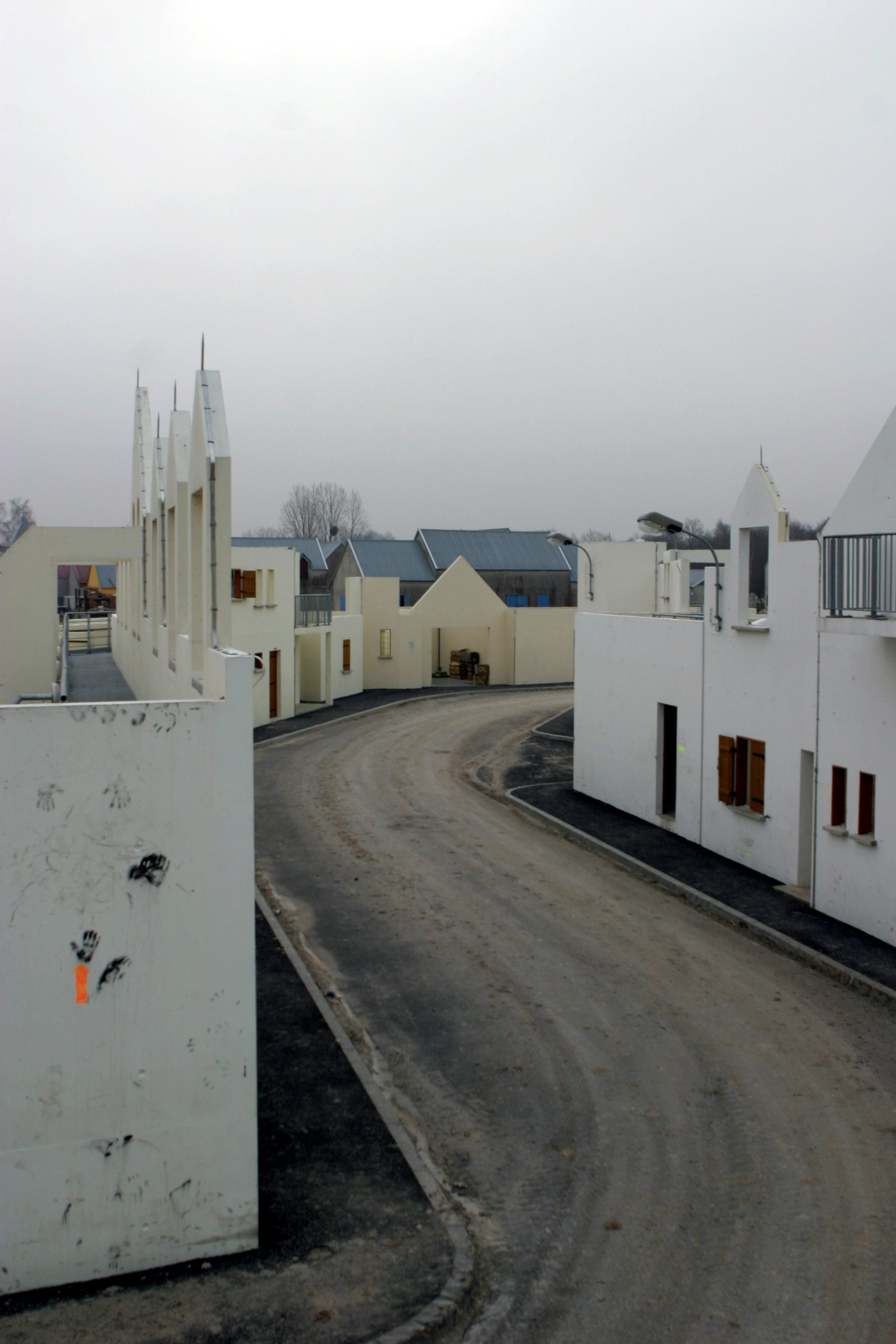
MASTTAC, showing observation walkway for instructors

- Technical and tactical skills acquisition module (Module d'acquisition des savoir-faire techniques et tactiques - MASTTAC)

A street with roofless houses. Instructors are able to observe trainees and to move ahead to adjust the environment during training sessions.

- Beauséjour

The village of Beauséjour consists of 63 different houses, a variety of obstacles (barriers, barricades, rubble), different types of streets (wide, narrow, S-shaped or unobstructed). It consists in various modules:
- the village itself
- a slum area in which it is impossible to enter with vehicles
- a caravan camp
- a street made up from 20-foot standard container, to refresh skills
- a hamlet intended to show various ways in which a building could be "hardened", ie, made more defensible (setting up sandbags on the floor, booby traps, etc).

- The ammunition depot

- a former warehouse where trainees can test their skills in progressing as a unit.

- Thuillots

An "old town" district located in the military camp, still partially occupied, especially by CENZUB's mechanical workshops. It simulates the outskirts of a village (woods, road, field, track) with several large buildings.

- Jeoffrecourt

The village of Jeoffrecourt represents a town of 5000 inhabitants, with tall buildings, commercial areas. It will simultaneously engage all military resources, including infantry, armour, artillery, engineers and aircraft. It has a main objective of training and restitution.

- Urban firing complex (Complexe de Tir en Zone UrBaine - CT ZUB)

This range enables firing in an urban environment to add realism to the training.

- Opposing force (FORce ADverse - FORAD)

105 personnel (including women) act as opposing forces or civilians for realism. They are structured as a mixed company with two infantry sections on VAB armoured personnel carriers or trucks, a tank platoon with AMX-30 tanks and an engineering section equipped with MPG and EBG. This unit is able to play the role of a regular combat unit, militia, or civilian refugees, depending on the scenario.

Views of training
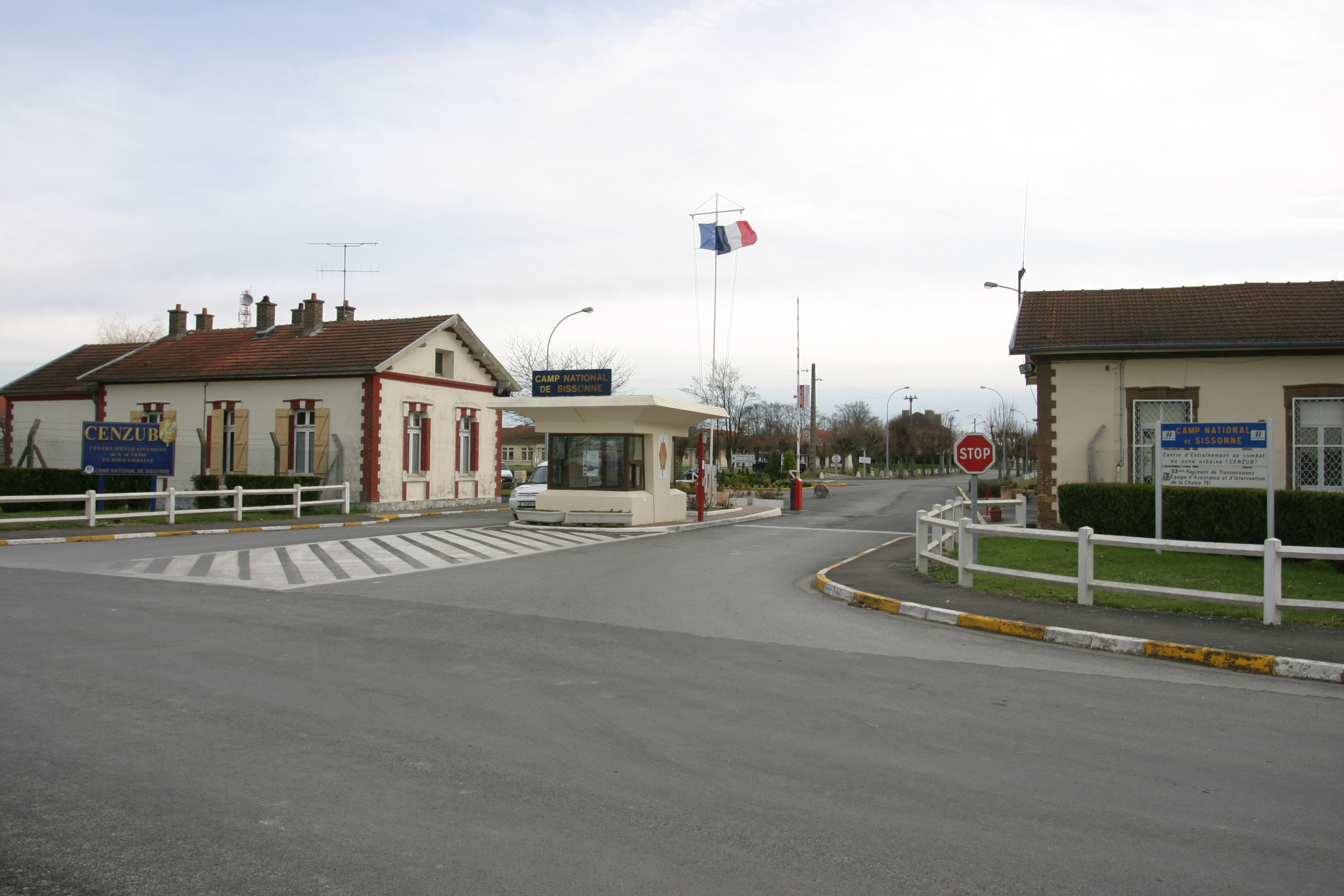
Entrance of CENZUB

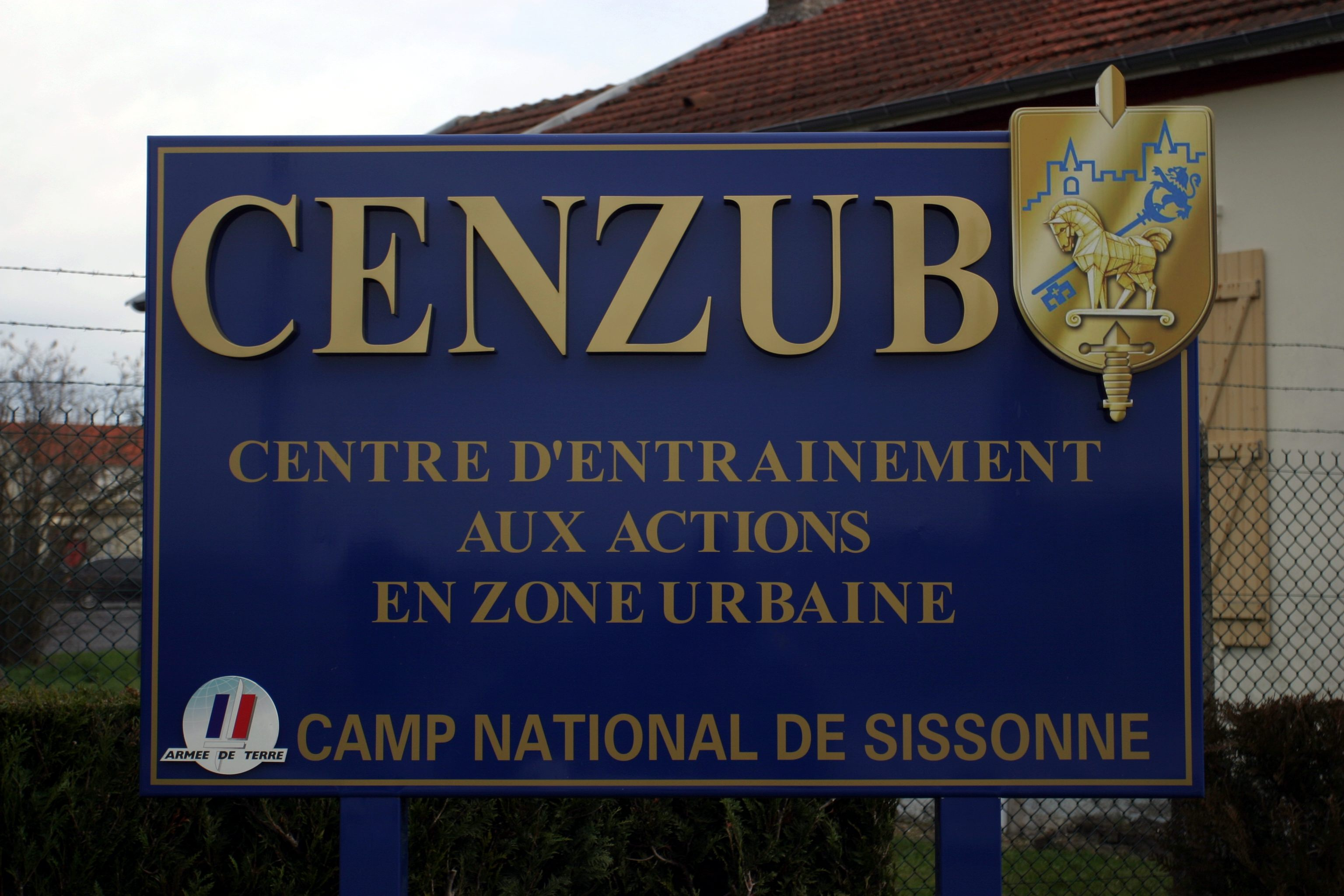
Entrance of CENZUB

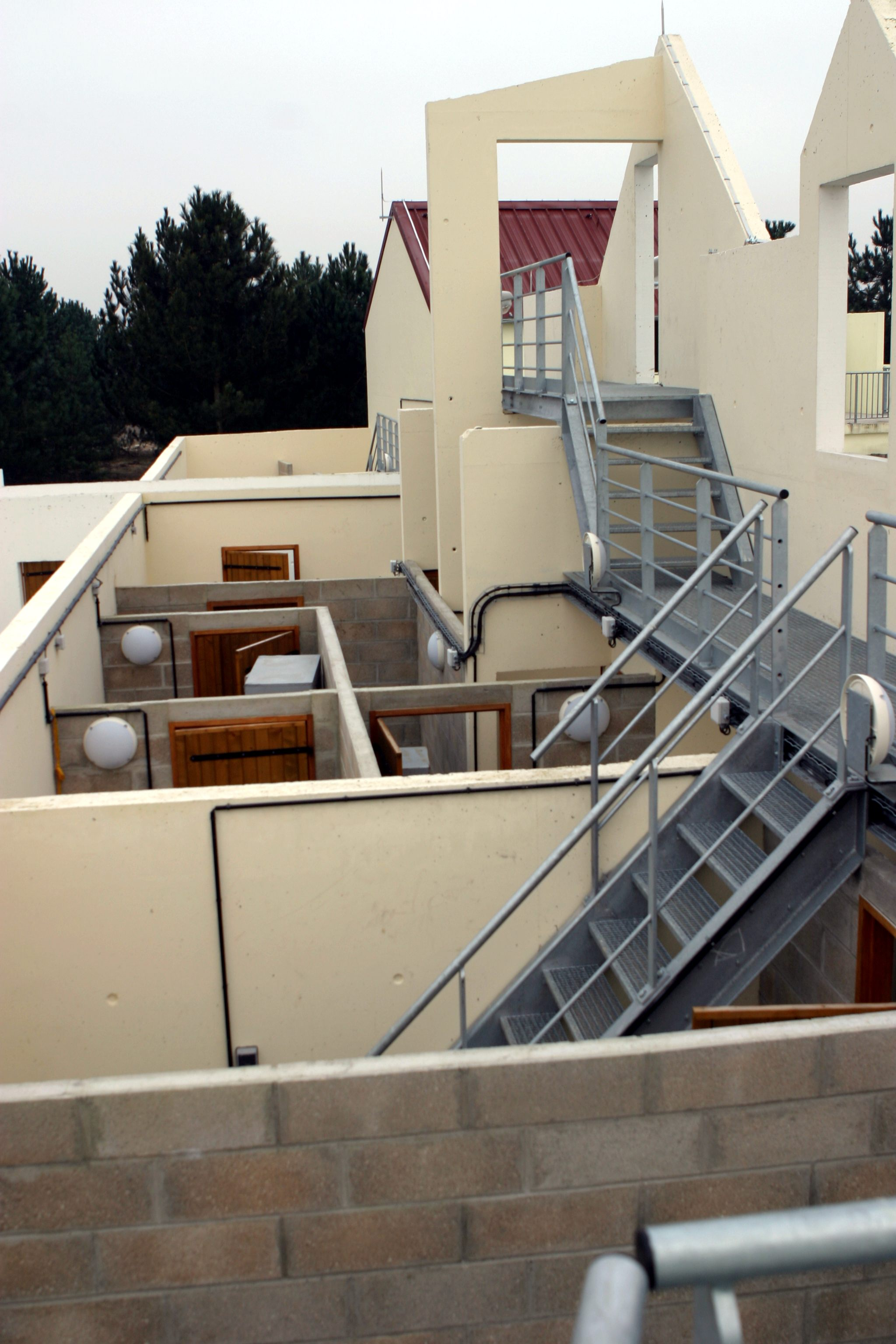
The MASTAC open-roofed houses, where instructors can oversee trainees from above

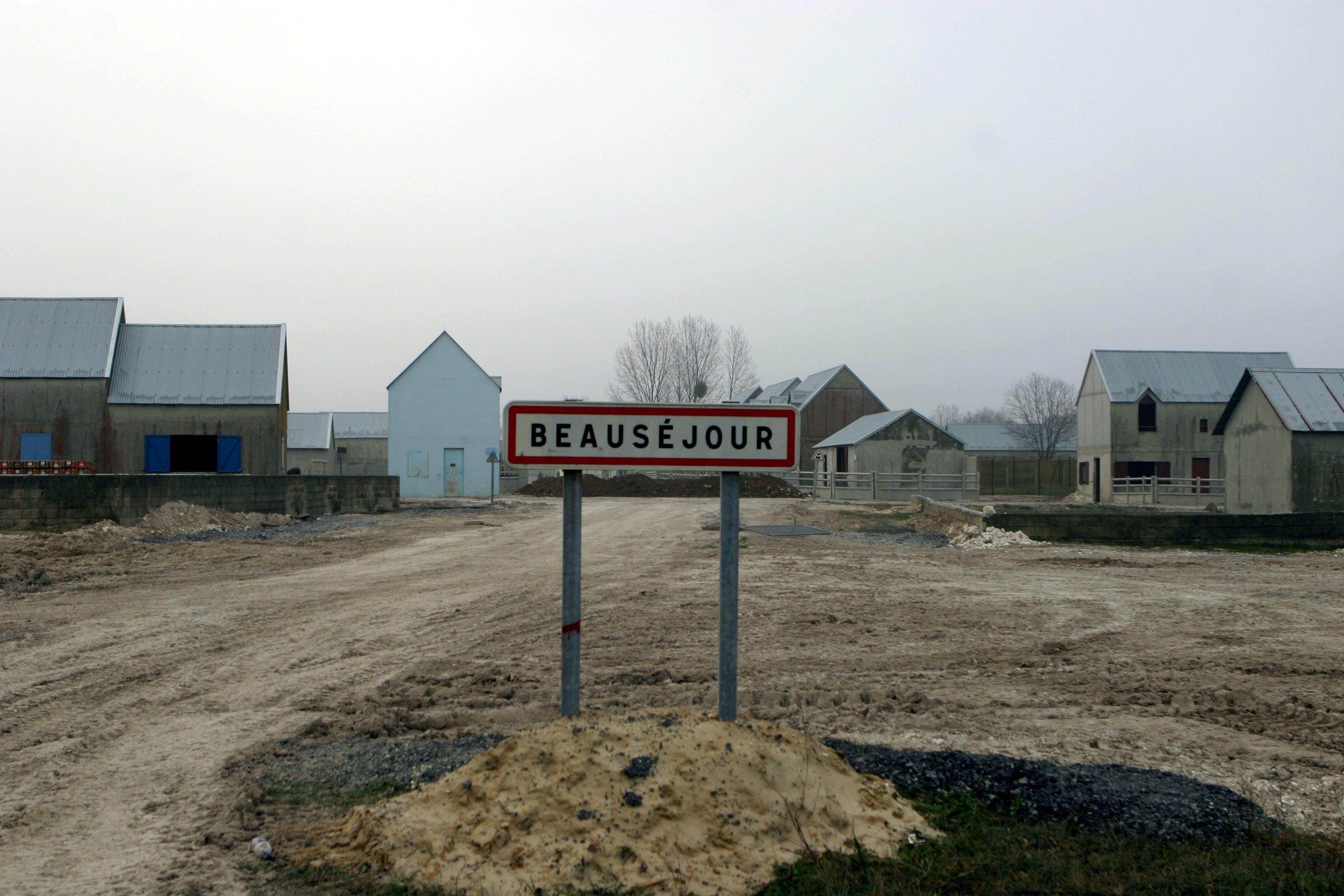
Beauséjour

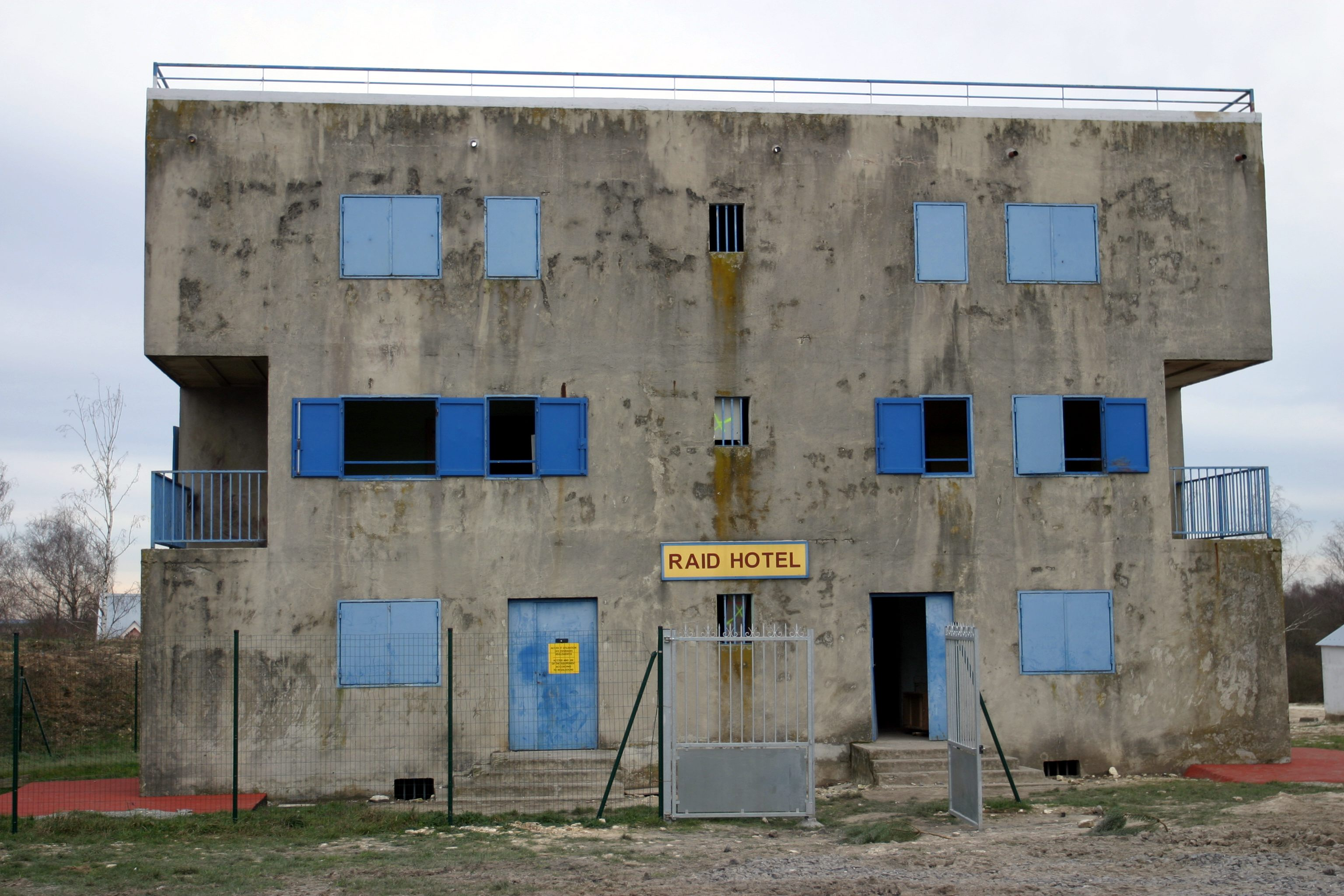
the "Raid Hotel"

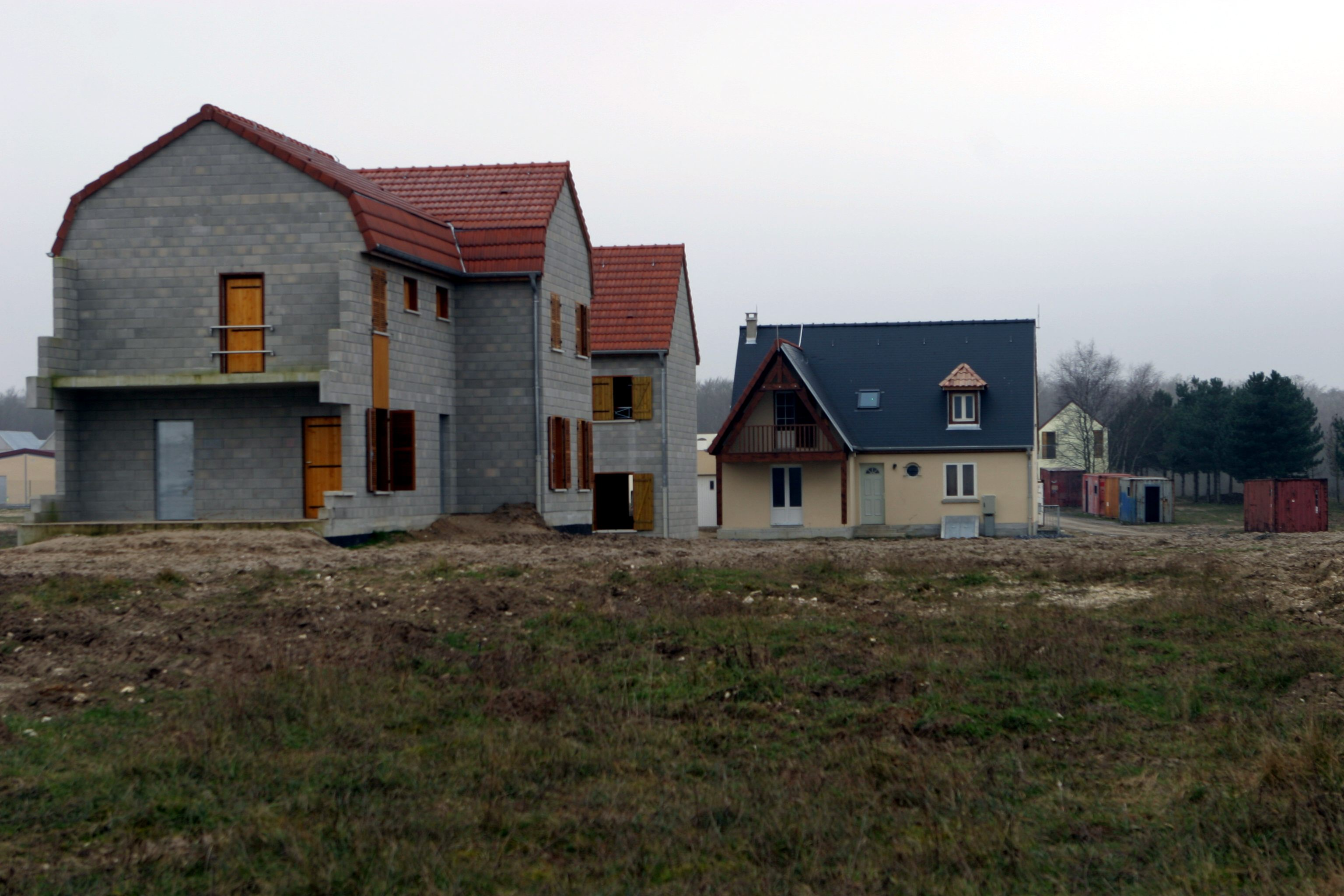
The "defensible hamlet" of Beauséjour

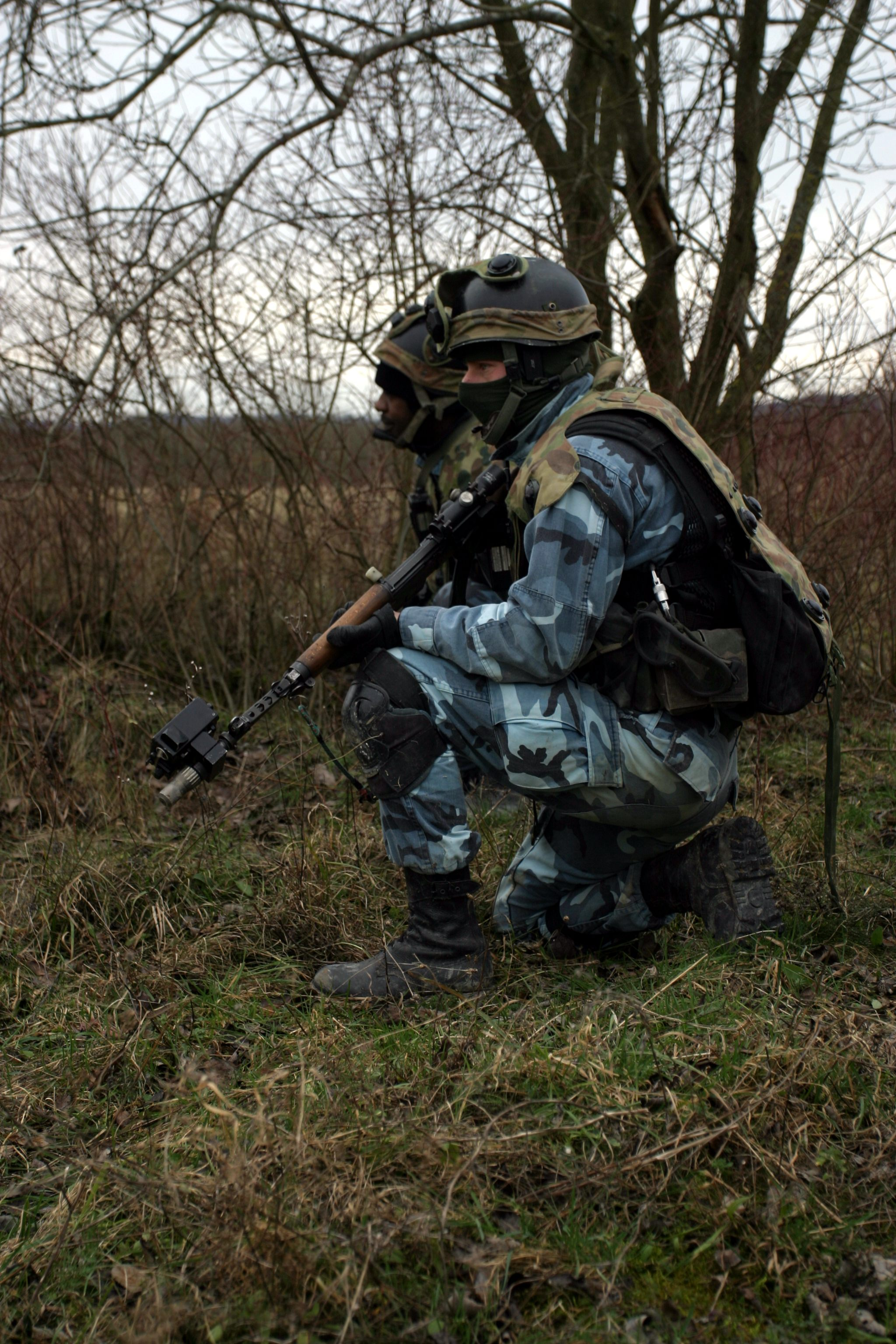
A member of FORAD (Opposing force)

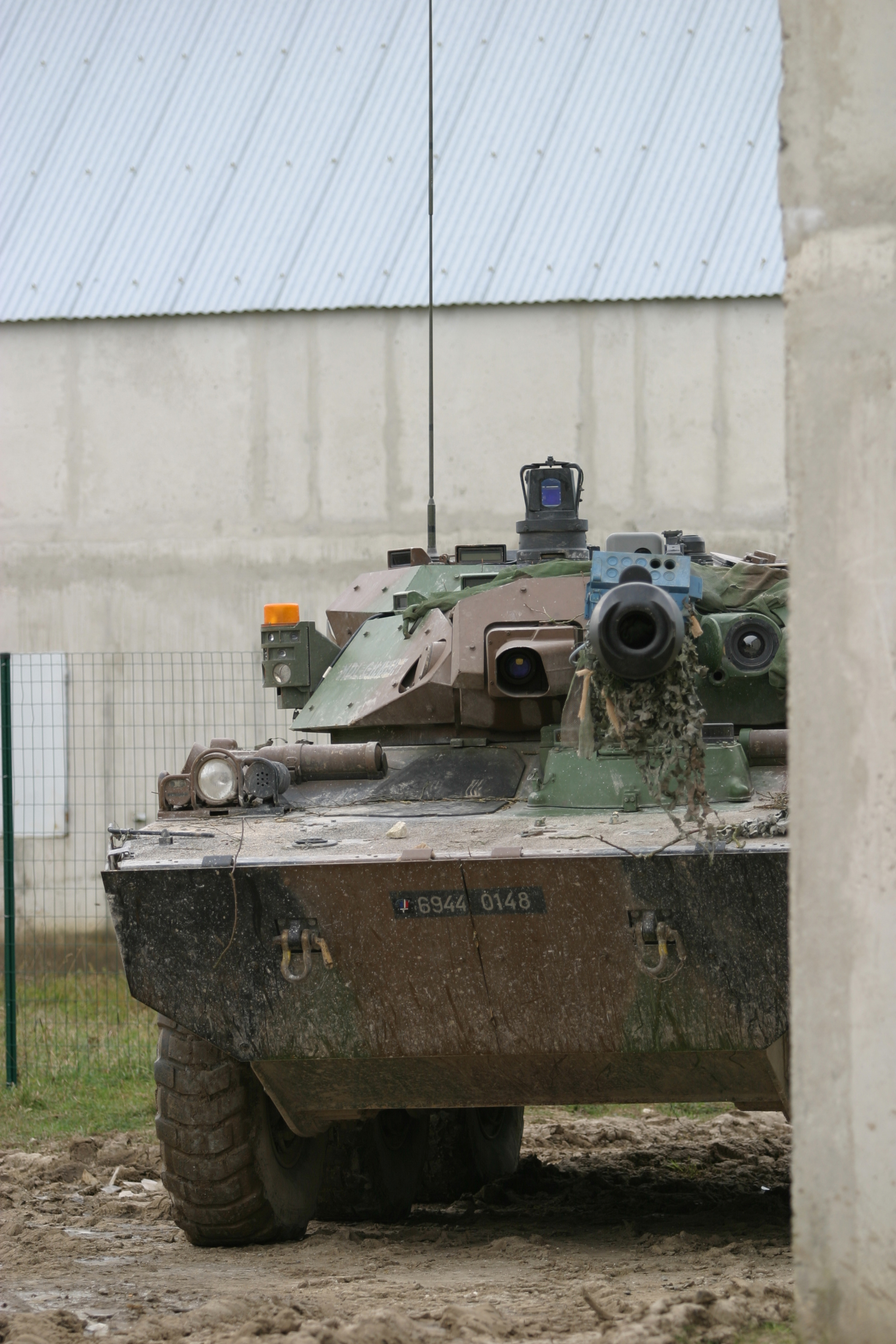
AMX-10RC

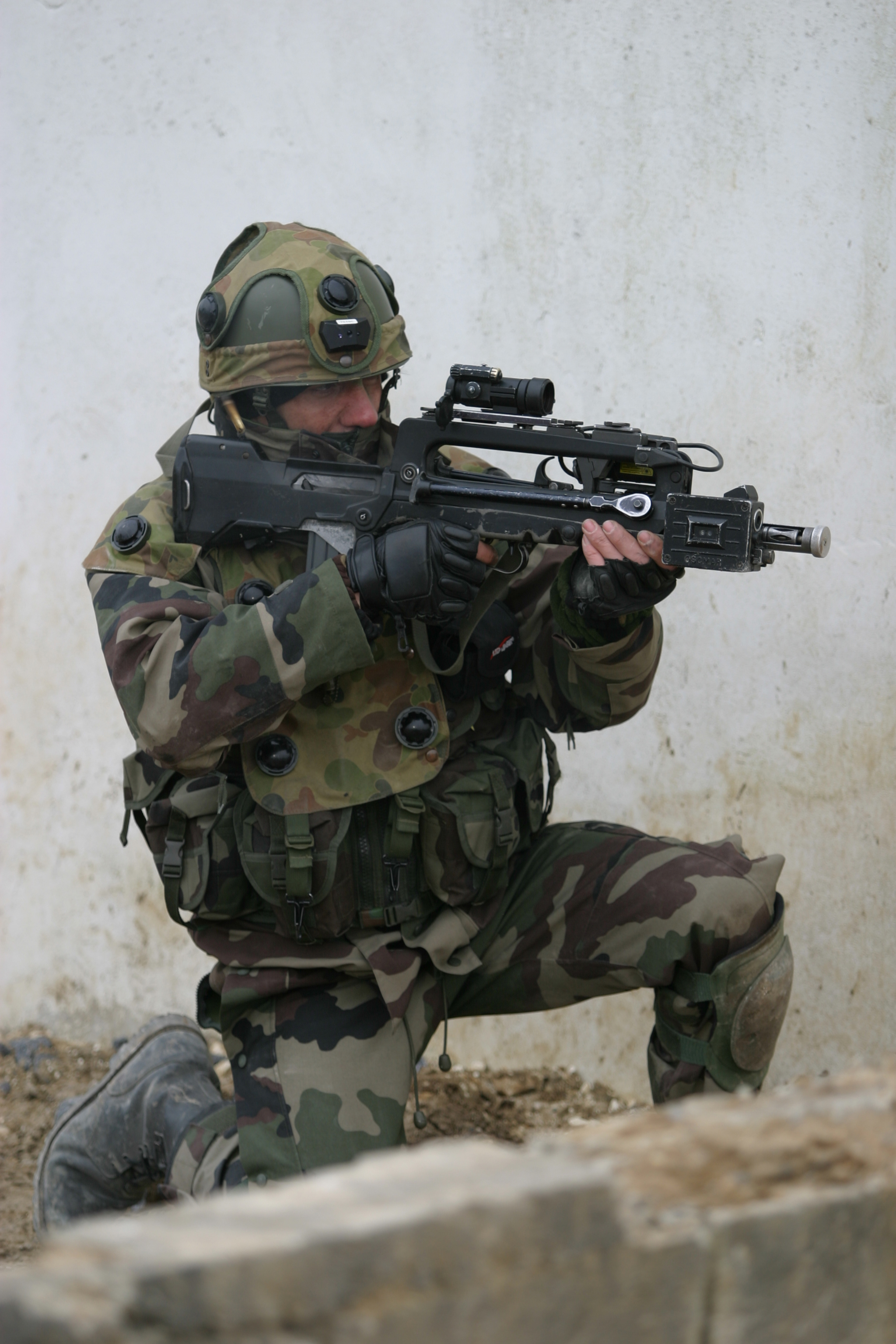
French infantry training

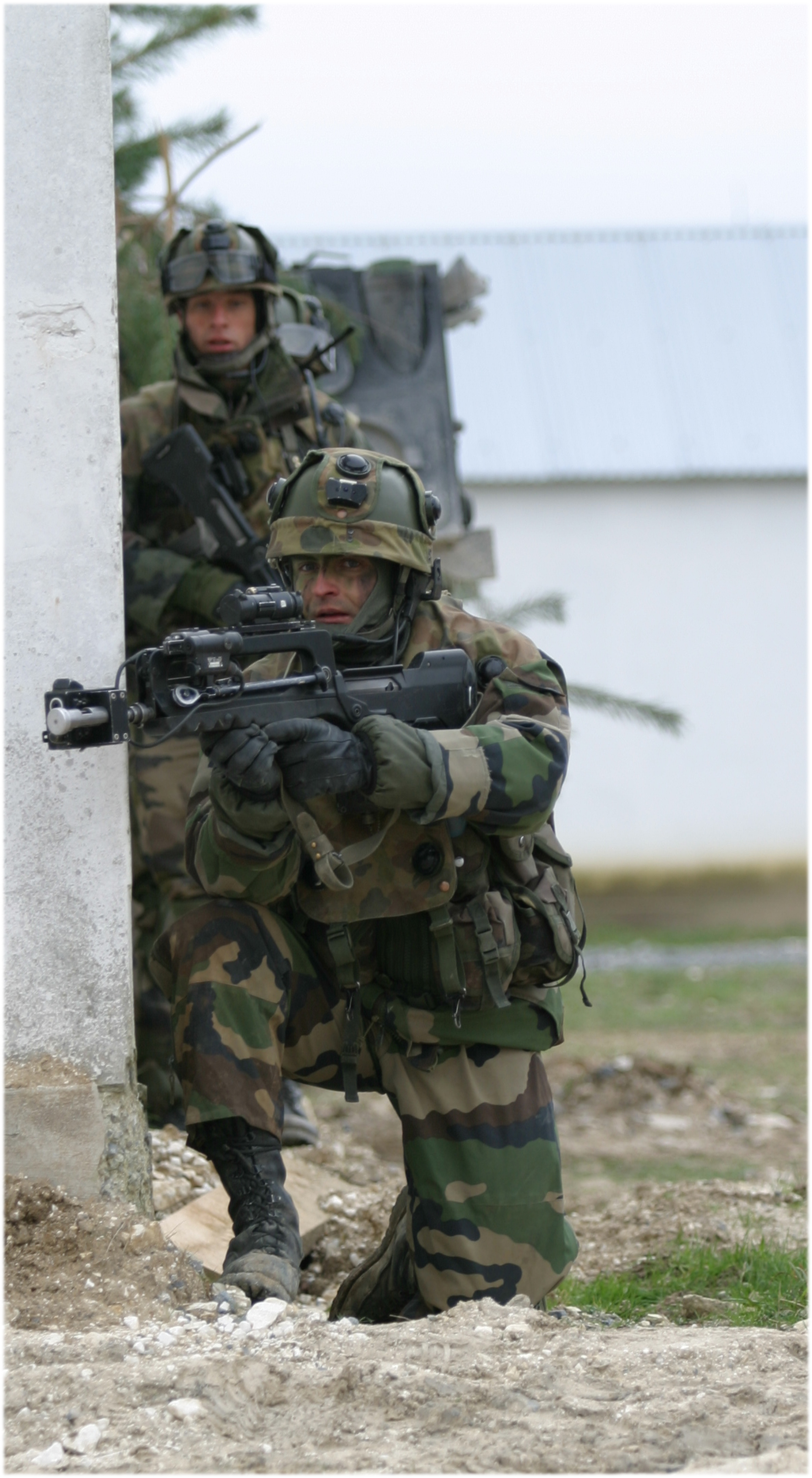
French infantry training

== See also ==
- Stanford Battle Area
