= CSK =

CSK may refer to:

== Companies ==
- CSK Auto, a subsidiary of O'Reilly Auto Parts
- CSK Holdings Corporation, a Japanese IT company

== Schools ==
- Carmel School (Kuwait), a Catholic school in Kuwait
- Chan Sui Ki (La Salle) College, a high school in Hong Kong
- Commission scolaire Kativik, the former French name for what is the Kativik Ilisarniliriniq

== Sports ==
- CSK VVS Samara (ice hockey), a professional ice hockey team in Samara, Samara Oblast, Russia
- Charlottenlund SK, a Norwegian sports club
- Chennai Super Kings, an Indian Premier League cricket team

== Other ==
- C-src tyrosine kinase, an enzyme
- Color shift keying
- Flightcraft, an American airline; see List of airline codes (F)
- Claremont serial killer; see Claremont serial killings
- Commander of the Order of the Star and Key of the Indian Ocean
- Country code of the former country of Czechoslovakia
- CSK, National Rail station code for Calstock railway station, Cornwall, England
- Cisauk railway station (coded CSK) in Tangerang Regency, Banten, Indonesia
- ISO-4217 currency code of its currency, the Czechoslovak koruna
