= Colobot =

2001 video game

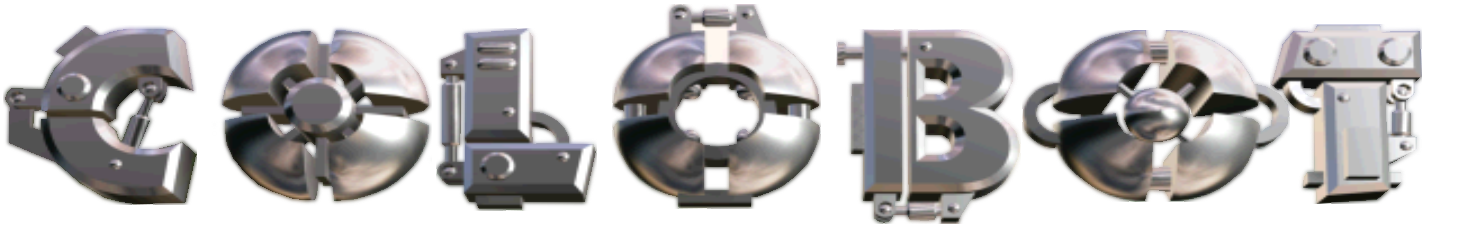
- Original author: Epsitec SA
- Developers: ICC & TerranovaTeam
- Release: 2001
- Preview release: 0.2.2 / 23 December 2024; 19 months ago
- Operating system: Linux, Windows
- Platform: Cross-platform
- Type: Real-time strategy
- License: GPL-3.0-or-later
- Website: colobot.info
- Repository: github.com/colobot/colobot

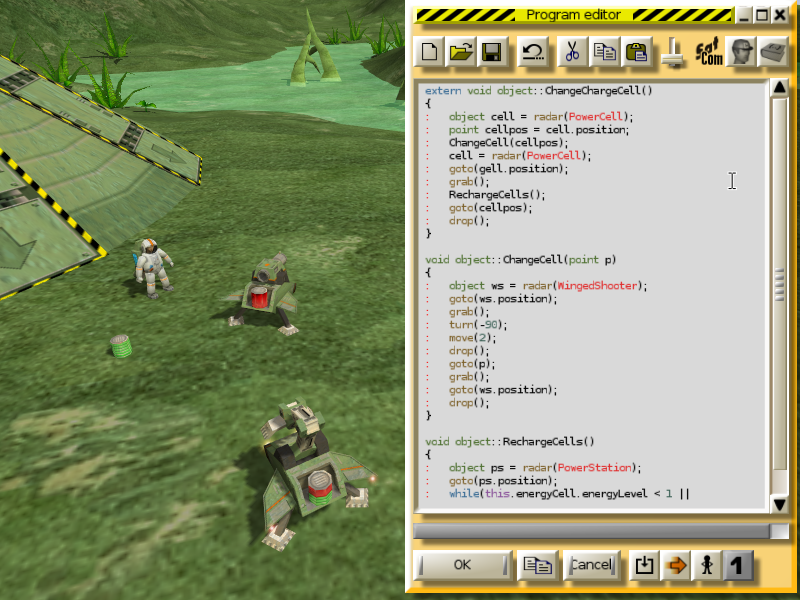
Screenshot of Colobot. Left, game scene with two bots and one explorer. Right, the program editor to create the code which controls the bots.

Colobot (Colonize with Bots) is an educational, post-apocalyptic real-time strategy video game featuring 3D graphics, created by Swiss developer Epsitec SA. The objective of the game is to find a planet for colonization by the human race by establishing a basic infrastructure on the surface and eliminating any alien life forms endangering the expedition. The game takes place on the Earth, Moon, and seven fictional planets. The main feature of the game, which makes it educational, is the possibility for players to program their robots using a programming language similar to C++ or Java.

== Plot overview ==
Life on earth is threatened by a devastating cataclysm, forcing mankind to move out and search for a new home. A first expedition composed solely of robots was sent to find another habitable planet, but for unknown reasons, the mission was a disaster and never returned.

With only a few robots for companions, the player must travel to new planets. Houston, Earth Mission Control as well as a spy satellite will transmit valuable information to the player. The player needs to build the infrastructure necessary to gather raw materials, energy supplies, and produce the weapons necessary to defend themselves. By programming robots, the player can delegate tasks to them, allowing the player to continue their mission while their robots upkeep the base, fight off enemies, harvest materials, and perform any other tasks assigned to them.

=== Missions ===
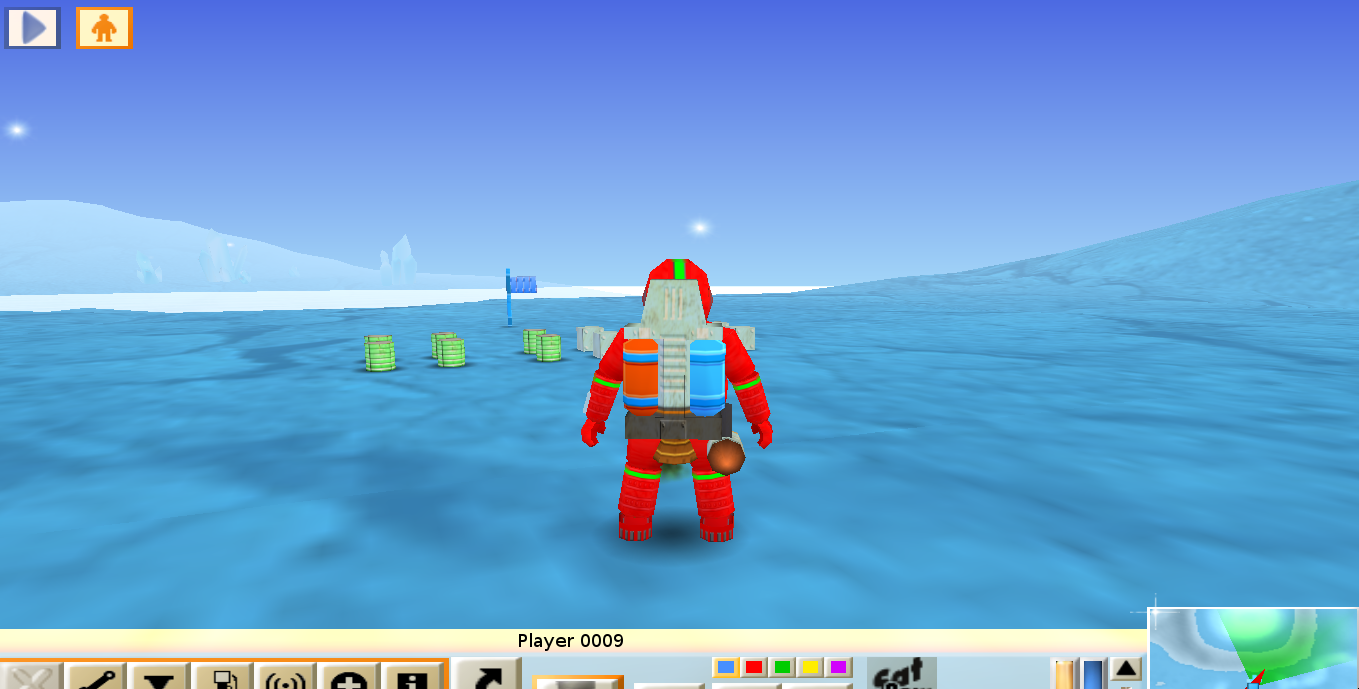
Screenshot of Colobot gameplay

In the game, the player explores Earth, Moon and seven fictional planets.

No.	Level's name	Object	Characteristics
1	Leaving Earth	Earth	The planet where the game begins.
2	On the Moon	Moon	Where the previous expedition was last seen.
3	On Tropica	Tropica	Tropical planet.
4	On Crystalium	Crystalium	A low-temperature planet featuring crystals.
5	On Saari	Saari	Desert planet.
6	On Volcano	Volcano	Volcanic planet.
7	On Centuary	Centuary	Dry planet.
8	On Orpheon	Orpheon	Electric planet.
9	On Terranova	Terranova	Planet similar to Earth.

== Language overview ==
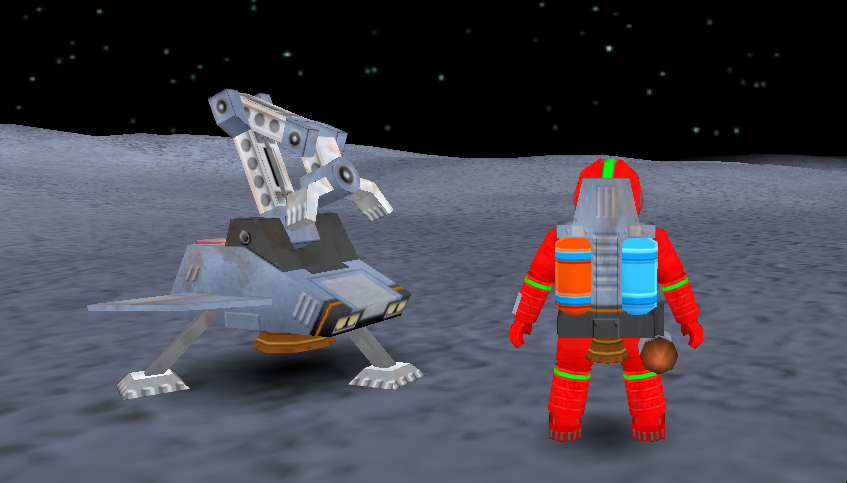
Bot in Colobot

The programming language used in Colobot is CBOT, syntactically similar to C++ and Java. Example code for a bot to find a piece of titanium ore and deliver it to a purification facility:

extern void object::FetchTitanium()
{
	object item; // declare variable
		
	item = radar(TitaniumOre); // find a piece of titanium ore
	goto(item.position); // go to the ore
	grab(); // pick up whatever is in front of the robot (presumably the ore)
	
	item = radar(Converter); // find the ore converter
	goto(item.position); // relocate to the converter
	drop(); // drop the piece of ore
	move(-2.5); // back up 2.5 meters to allow the converter to start processing the ore
}

== Legacy ==
Epsitec released the games' source code in March 2012 under GNU GPL-3.0-or-later after being contacted by the Polish game enthusiast community PPC.

ICC & TerranovaTeam (formerly PPC) was given the source code by Epsitec under the GPL-3.0-or-later license. TerranovaTeam is in the process of updating the game, titled Colobot: Gold Edition.

== Similar games ==
CeeBot, also made by Epsitec, is a similar series of games that spans four titles:

- CeeBot-A – an expansion of Colobot's Exercises & Challenges.
- CeeBot-Teen – geared to and simplified for a younger audience and has basic programming exercises.
- CeeBot3 – a program-to-paint programming course that allows students to make drawings and animations.
- CeeBot4 – a major programming course for college students and audiences in the programming field.

== Reception ==
The game has been recommended by the Polish Ministry of National Education as a teaching aid for learning the basics of algorithms and object-oriented programming.
