= CZE =

CZE or Cze may refer to:

- Czech Republic (ISO abbreviation)
- Czech language
- Capillary electrophoresis
- Cryptozoic Entertainment, a trading card game manufacturer
- José Leonardo Chirino Airport IATA code
- Che (Cyrillic) (Ч), a letter of the Cyrillic script
