= CEPT =

CEPT may refer to:

- CEPT University (Centre for Environmental Planning and Technology University), an academic institution located in Ahmedabad, India
- European Conference of Postal and Telecommunications Administrations, coordinating body for European state telecommunications and postal organizations
  - CEPT Recommendation T/CD 06-01, 1981 European Conference standard for display of videotext
- Common Effective Preferential Tariff, an ASEAN tariff and trade scheme
