= Chief of Joint Operations =

Chief of Joint Operations may refer to:

- Chief of Joint Operations (Australia) (CJOPS)
- Chief of Joint Operations (Sweden) (CJO)
- Chief of Joint Operations (United Kingdom) (CJO)
- Chief of Joint Operations, who directs the South African Joint Operations Division
