= CCPA =

CCPA may refer to:

== Science and health ==
- Catabolite Control Protein A (CcpA), a master regulator of carbon metabolism in gram-positive bacteria
- Childhood Cancer Parents Alliance, a UK cancer charity

== Politics ==
- California Consumer Privacy Act, legislation that seeks to protect the data privacy of technology users
- Canadian Centre for Policy Alternatives, a progressive policy research institute in Canada
- Consumer Credit Protection Act of 1968, a United States federal wage garnishment law
- United States Court of Customs and Patent Appeals (1909–1982), a former United States federal court

== Education and culture ==
- Chicago College of Performing Arts, a performing arts college at Roosevelt University, Chicago, Illinois
- Chinese Catholic Patriotic Association, the state-sponsored Catholic Church of China
- Coliseum College Prep Academy, a grade 6–12 public school in Oakland, California
- Covina Center for the Performing Arts, a theatre in Covina, California
