= CDD =

CDD may refer to:

== Entertainment ==
- Charlottesville Derby Dames, a roller derby league based in Virginia

== Medicine and psychology ==
- Childhood disintegrative disorder, a rare condition that causes late-onset developmental delays
- Concentration deficit disorder, another term for sluggish cognitive tempo
- Conserved domain database, a collation of protein structural and functional motifs from several independent databases
- Craniodiaphyseal dysplasia, a bone disorder causing calcium build up in the skull

== Science ==
- Collaborative Drug Discovery, a private software company with a web-based platform for managing drug discovery data
- Community-driven development, another software development technique
- Cooling degree day, a qualitative index used to reflect the demand for energy to cool a business
- Custom Debian Distribution, a customized Debian Distribution
- Cyclic delay diversity, a diversity scheme used in OFDM-based telecommunication systems

== Other uses ==
- Cardenden railway station, station code
- Centre for Democracy and Development, a non-government organization in Africa
- Cidade de Deus (Rio de Janeiro), a neighbourhood in Rio de Janeiro, Brazil
- Community Development District, a government organization authorized by Florida Statutes
- Congregatio Discipulorum Domini, a Catholic order founded in China
