= CMPD =

CMPD may refer to:

== Police departments ==
- Crisis Management and Planning Directorate, a European Union body in charge of integrated civilian-military planning
- Charlotte-Mecklenburg Police Department, North Carolina, United States
- Costa Mesa Police Department, California, United States

== Other uses ==
- Common Security and Defence Policy, a European Union policy directive
- Crisis Management and Planning Directorate, a former European Union body
