= CYM =

CYM or Cym may refer to:

== Organisations ==
- Choctaw Youth Movement, a Choctaw nationalist party and grassroots movement in Oklahoma
- Connolly Youth Movement, an Irish Marxist–Leninist youth group
- Centre for Young Musicians, London
- Spilka Ukraïns'koï Molodi (Спілка української молоді), the Ukrainian Youth Association
- CYM RFC, a Rugby Club in Dublin, Ireland

== Standardised codes ==
- Cayman Islands, by ISO 3166-1 country code
- Welsh language or Cymraeg, by ISO 639 language code
- .cym, an unused top-level Internet domain
- Chatham Seaplane Base, United States, by IATA airport code

== Other uses ==
- Cym, the Cymbidium orchid genus
- CYM, the CMYK color model, in printing
