= CCRP =

CCRP may be:

- California Coastal Records Project, documenting coastline of California with photography
- Continually Computed Release Point, is a weapons guidance technology
- Certified Canine Rehabilitation Practitioner, a certification available through coursework that designates a particular set of skills used for therapeutic rehabilitation in veterinary medicine.
- Collaborative Crop Research Program - a McKnight Foundation program that aims to funds participatory, collaborative research in Africa and the Andes.
- Command and Control Research Program - The Command and Control Research Program within the Office of the Assistant Secretary of Defense
- Comprehensive Community Revitalization Program - an organization in the South Bronx
- Certified Clinical Research Professional - Someone who has met the eligibility criteria and passed the certification exam. Certification Program creates an internationally accepted standard of knowledge, education and experience by which clinical research professionals will be recognized by the health care research community.
