= Coser =

Coser is a surname. Notable people with the surname include:

- Achille Coser (born 1982), Italian footballer
- George Lucas Coser (born 1984), Brazilian footballer
- Lewis A. Coser (1913–2003), American sociologist
- Rose Laub Coser (1916–1994), German-American sociologist, educator, and social justice activist

== See also ==
- Boards of Cooperative Educational Services, a program in New York State that provides cooperative services (CoSer)
- "Coser" as shortened spelling of "cosplayer"
