= CEV =

CEV may stand for:

== Medical ==
- Closed-eye visualization, a class of hallucination
- Clinically extremely vulnerable, an NHS category for those at high risk from a COVID-19 infection

== Religion ==
- Contemporary English Version, a translation of the Bible into English 1995
- Venezuelan Episcopal Conference, a Venezuelan Catholic archdiocesan organization

== Vehicles ==
- Crew Exploration Vehicle, NASA's proposed human spaceflight system, now known as Orion
- Combat engineering vehicle, armoured vehicles supporting battlefield engineering works
  - M728 combat engineer vehicle, a combat engineer vehicle mounted on a tank chassis

== Other ==
- European Volleyball Confederation (French: Confédération européenne de volleyball), the continental European volleyball governing body
- Certified Video Engineer, a professional title regulated by the Society of Broadcast Engineers
- Chemins de fer électriques Veveysans, a Swiss railway company
- Cochrane Eyes and Vision, a collaboration of researchers and healthcare professionals
- Coherent Extrapolated Volition, an approach to friendly artificial intelligence
- Constant elasticity of variance model, a pricing model
- Equivalent carbon content, also called "carbon equivalent value", a property of alloy steels
- Centre d'essais en vol, a flight testing centre in Brétigny-sur-Orge, France
- European Volunteer Centre
