= CNO =

CNO may refer to:

- C/N_{0}, the carrier-to-noise-density ratio of a signal
- Casualty notification officer, a person responsible for informing relatives of death or injury
- Chief networking officer, a business role
- Chief nursing officer, a nursing management position
- Chief of Naval Operations, the head of the United States Navy
- Chino Airport, in California, IATA symbol: CNO
- Chronic nuisance ordinance, a law that aims to evict tenants for reporting crime
- CNO cycle, a stellar nuclear fusion reaction
- Coconut oil, an edible oil
- College of Nurses of Ontario, an Ontario professional regulatory body
- Computer network operations, the optimization and use of digital telecommunications
- CNO Financial Group, an American financial services holding company
- CNO (gene), which encodes the protein cappuccino homolog
- Clozapine N-oxide, a synthetic ligand which activates a receptor
- Fulminate, a chemical compound containing the CNO^{−} ion
- Nitrile oxide, a chemical compound with the functional group RCNO
