= CJD =

CJD can mean:

- Chojoongdong, South Korean newspaper
- Christliches Jugenddorfwerk Deutschlands, German Christian educational institution
- Creutzfeldt–Jakob disease, rare disease of the brain caused by prions
- Candilejas Airport, Colombia (by IATA code)
