= CNV =

CNV may refer to:

- Chinese New Version, a Chinese language Bible translation
- Choroidal neovascularization in ophthalmology
- City of North Vancouver in British Columbia, as opposed to its surrounding District of North Vancouver
- Christelijk Nationaal Vakverbond in Dutch Trade Unions
- Copy number variation in genetics
- contingent negative variation in evoked potentials
- Cranial nerve V, also known as the trigeminal nerve
- Communication Non Violente, the French version of the acronym NVC Non Violent Communication
- Cocoa necrosis virus, a disease of cocoa trees
