= CBOL =

CBOL may refer to:

- CBOL, a former AM radio station licensed to Armstrong, Ontario, Canada; converted to FM transmitter in 2013 as repeater for CBQT-FM
- Consortium for the Barcode of Life, an international initiative supporting the development of DNA barcoding standards
