= Cocom (disambiguation) =

Cocom may refer to:

- The Cocom, a Mayan dynasty of Mayapan in the Yucatan
- Kokama people, a Native American tribe in the Amazon
- CoCom, the Coordinating Committee for Multilateral Export Controls organized to restrict Western exports to COMECON countries
- COCOM (or CoCOM), the command relationship exercised over assigned forces by a Unified Combatant Command which is a United States joint military command that is composed of forces from two or more services and has a broad and continuing mission.
- COCOM A/S, a Danish cable modem company acquired by Cisco in 1999
