= C3I =

C3I may refer to:

- Command, Control, Communications and intelligence, a military abbreviation
- Command, Control, Communications and Information, a British military abbreviation
- The C3I Programme, an initiative of London's Metropolitan Police Service
- Christian City Churches International, an Australia-based evangelical movement
- C3i, a GMT Games magazine published by Rodger B. MacGowan
- 3CI - Comradeship, Commitment, Courage and Integrity, a New Zealand military abbreviation
