= CPSM =

CPSM may refer to:

== Organisations ==
- College of Physicians and Surgeons of Manitoba, Canada
- College of Physicians & Surgeons of Mumbai, India

== Other uses ==
- Canadian Peacekeeping Service Medal, a campaign medal
- Central Plan Scheme Monitoring System, India
- Certified Professional in Supply Management, a professional credential
- Stadionul CPSM, a football stadium in Vadul lui Vodă, Moldova
