= CGF =

CGF may refer to:

- Carlingford railway station (station code), a defunct railway station in Sydney, Australia
- Commonwealth Games Federation, an international sports organization
- Consumer Goods Forum, a global organization of consumer goods companies
- Cumulant generating function expression for defining statistical mean, variance, and higher-order cumulants.
- Cuyahoga County Airport (IATA and FAA LID code), near Cleveland, Ohio
