= CXR =

CXR may mean;

- Charing Cross Road, a street in London, United Kingdom
- Chest X-ray, a projection radiograph of the thorax
- Christmas Island (via ISO 3166-1 country code)
- Carrier signal, in US telephony jargon
- Cam Ranh International Airport, IATA code CXR
- CXR Anderson Jacobson, a vendor of communications equipment
