= C-Bus =

C-Bus or Cbus may refer to:

- Clipsal C-Bus, a home-automation product range manufactured by Clipsal Australia.
- C-Bus (protocol), an open protocol used by Clipsal C-Bus products.
- Compatible Bus, a 16-bit local bus in certain PC-98-based personal computers.
- Cbus (superannuation fund), a superannuation fund for the building and construction industries in Australia
- Nickname for Columbus, Ohio
- The CBUS, a local bus service in Columbus, Ohio
