= CMOC =

CMOC may refer to:

- Canadian Museum of Civilization, the former name of the Canadian Museum of History, a museum in Hull, Gatineau, Quebec
- Cheyenne Mountain Operations Center
- Civil-military operations center
- Commodity Markets Oversight Coalition
- Check Mii Out Channel for the Wii
- CMOC Group Limited
