= CUW =

CUW or cuw may refer to:

- Chukwa language, ISO 3-letter language code cuw
- Clunderwen railway station, station code CUW
- Concordia University Wisconsin
- Copper–tungsten, chemical formula CuW
- Curaçao, ISO 3-letter country code CUW
