= Council of Korean Americans =

U.S. non-profit organization

The Council of Korean Americans or CKA is a nonprofit organization with a mission to advance the voice and influence of the Korean American community in the United States.

== History ==
CKA began in 2011 as a group of Korean Americans who wanted to build an organization to strengthen the voice, visibility, and influence of the Korean American community. Its aim is to transform this community to become more active contributors and leaders.

== Activism ==
At a hearing of United States House Of Representatives' Subcommittee On The Constitution, Civil Rights, And Civil Liberties titled Discrimination And Violence Against Asian Americans, Abraham Kim, the Executive Director, submitted a written statement in the wake of COVID-era race-based violence.

== Events ==
At the first briefing of CKA at the White House in 2012, Chris Lu, White House Initiative on Asian Americans and Pacific Islanders, welcomed the opportunity to hear about how it can better serve them.

The group highlights Korean American Day (January 13th), which commemorates the day in 1903 that Korean immigrants arrived to become Americans, and celebrates today’s Korean American community. The U.S. Senate and House of Representatives officially established Korean American Day in 2005.

In 2017, it co-sponsored a panel discussion at UCLA titled Sa-I-Gu: The LA Uprisings 25 Years Later - Witnessing the Past, Envisioning our Future. (Sa I Gu translates to 4-2-9 and refers to the month and day (4/29) of the first day of the 1992 Los Angeles riots.)

With Harvard University, it co-sponsored a talk by Ed Park, the 2024 Pulitzer Prize Finalist in Fiction for his novel Same Bed Different Dreams.

With the US House of Representatives, it co-sponsored the 17th Annual 7/27 Armistice Day Commemoration, which marked the 15th anniversary of the enactment of the law establishing July 27th as National Korean War Veterans Armistice Day.
