= CFRP =

CFRP may refer to:

- Carbon-fiber-reinforced polymers, a material
- CFRP-FM, a radio rebroadcaster (100.5 FM) licensed to Forestville, Quebec, Canada

== See also ==
- Center for Responsive Politics (CRP), a research group based in Washington, D.C., US, now part of OpenSecrets
