= CWL =

CWL may refer to:

== Businesses and organizations ==
- California Women Lawyers, a bar association in California, US
- Cardiff Airport (IATA code), Wales
- Catholic Women's League, a lay organisation
- Centralne Warsztaty Lotnicze, a Polish aircraft manufacturer
- Compagnie des Wagons-Lits, French on-train service company
- Company of Watermen and Lightermen, a guild of the city of London, England

== Science and technology ==
- Centre wavelength, for a bandpass filter
- Common Workflow Language, for computation in the sciences

== Other uses ==
- Call of Duty World League, a former esports tournament
- Concealed Weapons License, an aspect of Constitutional carry
