= CESS =

CESS may refer to:

- Central Eurasian Studies Society, a North American–based society for scholars concerned with the Central Eurasian region
- Centre for Earth Science Studies, an autonomous research centre to promote and establish scientific and technological research and development studies in the earth sciences, in Thiruvananthapuram, Kerala, India
- Centre for Economic and Social Studies, Hyderabad
- Education cess, in India, a tax earmarked to promote education.
- Cess, a tax
