= CIO =

CIO or cio may refer to:

== Organizations ==
=== Governmental organizations ===
- Central Imagery Office, an office of the US Department of Defense that was a predecessor of the National Geospatial-Intelligence Agency
- Central Intelligence Office, the national intelligence agency of the former South Vietnam
- Central Intelligence Organisation, the national intelligence agency of Zimbabwe
- Corruption Investigation Office for High-ranking Officials, a government agency of South Korea

=== Non-governmental organizations ===
- Centro de Investigaciones en Optica, a Mexican research centre in optics
- Charitable incorporated organisation, a form of legal entity for non-profit organizations in the United Kingdom
- Comité international olympique or International Olympic Committee, an international sports federation
- Congress of Industrial Organizations or Committee of Industrial Organization, a 1935–1955 national trade union centre that merged into the AFL-CIO
- Credit and Investments Ombudsman, an Australian dispute resolution service

== Titles ==
- Chairperson-in-office, an official of a member state holding the presidency of an international organization
  - Commonwealth Chairperson-in-Office, an official of the Commonwealth of Nations
- Chief information officer, the head of information technology
- Chief innovation officer, the head of innovation, responsible for innovation management
- Chief investment officer, the head of investments

== Other uses ==
- CIO (magazine), both print and online
- Concurrent input/output, a feature in the JFS file system
- Conventional International Origin, a conventionally defined reference axis of the pole's average location
- "Cry it out", an aspect of the Ferber method for solving childhood sleep problems
- City One station, Hong Kong, MTR station code
