= CHT =

CHT or ChT may refer to:

== Medicine and biology ==
- Certified Hyperbaric Technologist, a certification of the National Board of Diving and Hyperbaric Medical Technology
- Choline transporter (ChT), a protein
- Cross-sex hormone therapy

== Places ==
- Chatham Islands / Tuuta Airport, in New Zealand, IATA code
- Chau Tau station, a proposed station in Lok Ma Chau, Hong Kong, MTR station code
- Chittagong Hill Tracts, in Bangladesh

== Science and technology ==
- Cylinder Head Temperature gauge, an engine control sensor
- Cycloheptatriene, an organic chemical compound
- Ford CHT engine, a Compound High Turbulence engine which is an inline four-cylinder internal combustion engine produced during the 1980s and 1990s
- Conjugate convective heat transfer, a combination of heat transfer in solids and fluids
- Center for Humane Technology (formerly called Time Well Spent), a nonprofit organization working to reimagining the digital infrastructure

== Other ==
- Canada Health Transfer
- Chunghwa Telecom, NYSE symbol
- Cross-Harbour Tunnel, in Hong Kong
- Shenzhen Changhong Technology Co., Ltd.
