= CPAP (disambiguation) =

CPAP is continuous positive airway pressure, a form of positive airway pressure ventilator.

CPAP may also refer to:

- Center for Public Administration and Policy, an academic department of Virginia Tech
- CPAP (gene), a gene that encodes Centrosomal P4.1-associated protein
- Coalition for the Prevention of Alcohol Problems, a public advocacy group based in Washington, D.C.
- Consecutive primes in arithmetic progression, a mathematical term relating to prime number series
- C/PAP, a code for paper and cardboard/plastic/aluminum composite in recycling code #84
