= CHF =

CHF may refer to:

== Organizations ==
- Chemical Heritage Foundation, former name of the Science History Institute, an institution that preserves and promotes understanding of the history of science
- Chi Heng Foundation, a Hong Kong–based non-governmental organisation dedicated to addressing children impacted by AIDS
- Chicago Humanities Festival, a foundation which organizes an annual series of lectures, concerts, and films
- Children's Health Fund, a non-profit organization that provides health care to children and families
- Children's Hunger Fund, a Christian non-profit organization that empowers local churches to meet the needs of impoverished community members
- Commando Helicopter Force, a unit of the Royal Navy Fleet Air Arm
- CHF International, former name of Global Communities, an international development and humanitarian aid organization
- Community Health Fund, a Tanzanian health insurance scheme

== Science and technology ==
- Congestive heart failure, a disease when the heart is unable to pump sufficiently to maintain blood flow to meet the body's needs
- Critical heat flux, the thermal limit of a phenomenon in thermodynamics
- Cryptographic hash function, a special class of hash function that has certain properties which make it suitable for use in cryptography
- Central hydraulic fluid, used in automobile power steering
- Chemical formula of hafnium(IV) carbide (CHf)

== Transport ==
- Chung Fu stop, a Light Rail stop in Hong Kong
- Church Fenton railway station, North Yorkshire, England (National Rail station code)

== Other uses ==
- Centre half-forward, a position in Australian rules football
- Swiss franc, by ISO 4217 code, currency of Switzerland and Liechtenstein
