= CDEC =

CDEC may refer to:

- California Data Exchange Center, a part of the Division of Flood Management, California Department of Water Resources
- Captured Document Exploitation Center, a U.S. Army organization
- Career Development & Employment Centre, located on the campus of the University of Sussex in England
- Centro di Documentazione Ebraica Contemporanea (Center of Contemporary Jewish Documentation), in Milan, Italy
- Colorado Department of Early Childhood
- Combat Development Experimentation Command, an additional U.S. Army organization
- CDEC Gaming, a Chinese Dota 2 team
