= CYP =

CYP may refer to:

- CYP, IATA airport code for Calbayog Airport in the Philippines
- CYP, national railway code for Crystal Palace railway station in London, UK
- CYP, ISO 3166-1 alpha-3 country code for Cyprus
- CYP, ISO 4217 code for the Cypriot pound
- Cyclophilin
- Cytochrome P450, isoenzyme
- Cypripedium, orchid genus
