= CLOB =

CLOB may refer to:

- Character large object, a collection of character data in a database management system
- Clabber, a trick-taking card game
- CLOB, slang for the drug Methcathinone
- Central limit order book, a centralised database of limit orders proposed by the Securities Exchange Commission
