= CMML =

CMML may refer to:

- Continuous Media Markup Language
- Consejo Mundial de Lucha Libre
- Chronic myelomonocytic leukemia
