= CMW =

CMW may refer to:

- Central Maintenance and Welding, the leading union contractor in FL
- Canadian Music Week, an industry conference and music festival held in Toronto, Canada
- Chicago, Missouri and Western Railway (CM&W), a railway which operated in the midwest United States
- Chien-Ming Wang, baseball pitcher
- Compton's Most Wanted, an American gangsta rap group
- Canadian Manufacturing Week (CMW), a trade show sponsored by the Society of Manufacturing Engineers
- Ignacio Agramonte International Airport, Cuba, IATA airport code CMW
