= CJCS =

CJCS may refer to:

- Chairman of the Joint Chiefs of Staff, the highest-ranking and senior-most military officer in the United States Armed Forces
- CJCS-FM, a Canadian radio station in Stratford, Ontario
