= CMHC =

CMHC is an abbreviation for different entities:

- Canada Mortgage and Housing Corporation, a Canadian government agency providing homebuyer assistance and insurance to lenders in case of defaults
- Central Minnesota Heart Center
- Clark Material Handling Company, a manufacturer of forklift trucks in Lexington, Kentucky, USA
- Connacht Minor Hurling Championship, a hurling competition in Ireland
- Clinical Mental Health Counseling
