= CCGS =

CCGS can refer to:

- Collectible card game
- Canadian Coast Guard Ship, a ship prefix
- Central Coast Grammar School, a school in Australia
- Christ Church Grammar School, a school in Australia
- Chatham and Clarendon Grammar School, a school in Ramsgate, Kent
- Cooperating Colleges of Greater Springfield
- Crown Championship: Global Series, a worldwide Clash Royale tournament

== See also ==
- CCG (disambiguation)
- CGS (disambiguation)
