= CTO =

CTO or cto may refer to:

== Occupations ==
- Chief technology officer, an executive officer in an organization focused on scientific and technological issues
  - Chief Technology Officer of the United States
- Certified Television Operator, an operator certified by the Society of Broadcast Engineers

== Organizations ==
- Cape Town Opera, South African opera company
- Caribbean Tourism Organization, for sustainable tourism
- Commonwealth Telecommunications Organisation, a partnership between Commonwealth and non-Commonwealth governments, business, and civil society organisations
- Cyprus Tourism Organisation, a semi-governmental organisation in Cyprus
- CTO Hospital (Turin), a major medical center in Turin, Italy

== Other ==
- Cancelled-to-order, a postage-stamp cancelled by the postal administration before sale to stamp-collectors
- Configure-to-order, production strategy where pre-defined components are assembled after a customer places an order for a product. Similar to Built to Order
- Activated carbon filter to improve Chlorine, Taste, Odor
- Chronic total occlusion, a disease of a coronary artery of the heart
- City ticket office for an airline
- Color temperature orange, a type of color gel filter used in color correction
- Community treatment order, an implementation of mental-health law in Australia, England and most provinces in Canada
- Crude Tall Oil, a viscous yellow-black odorous liquid obtained as a by-product of the kraft process of wood pulp

== See also ==
- Central Treaty Organization (CenTO), a former intergovernmental military alliance
