= CAAT =

CAAT may refer to:

- Civil Aviation Authority of Thailand, an independent agency of the Thai government.
- Computer Assisted Auditing Techniques Techniques and computer programs that are developed to audit electronic data
- Centro de Apoyo Académico y Tutorías Academic Student Support Services & Tutoring Center
- Center for Alternatives to Animal Testing, a US research center
- Campaign Against Arms Trade, a British campaigning organisation
- The CAAT box in molecular genetics
- The Children's Air Ambulance Trust, a fundraising organisation for the Children's Air Ambulance
- Cornwall Air Ambulance Trust, a charity that maintains and runs the Cornwall air ambulance
- Combined Anti-Armor Team - Highly mobile Anti-Armor teams used by the United States Marine Corps
- Captive Air Amphibious Transporter, a DARPA tracked amphibious vehicle carrying containers from ship to shore
- Colleges of Applied Arts and Technology in the Canadian province of Ontario
