= CSIS =

CSIS may refer to:

- Canadian Security Intelligence Service, Canada's primary national intelligence service
- Center for Strategic and International Studies, a think tank in the US
- Centre for Strategic and International Studies, a think tank in Jakarta, Indonesia
- Civil Service Islamic Society, a British non-political, voluntary society
- Container Shipping Information Service, a trade group for the container shipping industry
- China seismic intensity scale, a national standard in the People's Republic of China

== See also ==
- CSI (disambiguation)
