= CLEC =

CLEC or Clec may refer to:

- Clec (album), a 1995 album by Perfect Houseplants, co-founded by Huw Warren
- Colonial Land and Emigration Commission, a British government authority that existed from the 1840s to 1878
- Competitive local exchange carrier, a type of telecommunications provider company
- C-type lectin domain, a protein domain

== See also ==
- All pages starting "CLEC"
