= CACM =

CACM may refer to:

- California Association of Community Managers, one of the certifying agencies of the Certified Community Association Manager.
- Central American Common Market
- Certified Associate Contracts Manager, a former certification from the National Contract Management Association that is now called "Certified Federal Contracts Manager"
- Communications of the ACM
