= CPV =

CPV may refer to:

== In mathematics, science and technology ==
=== Viruses ===
- Canine parvovirus
- Cricket paralysis virus
- Cryptosporidium parvum virus, a dsRNA virus of the single-celled causative agent of Cryptosporidiosis

=== Other uses in mathematics, science and technology ===
- Cauchy principal value, a method for assigning values to certain improper integrals in mathematics
- Composite Pressure Vessel, often gas cylinders made of composite materials
- Concentrator photovoltaics, a solar power technology
- Continued process verification, ongoing monitoring of all aspects of the production cycle
- CP-violation, a phenomenon in physics

== Transport ==
- Air Corporate (ICAO code CPV), an Italian airline
- Compassvale LRT station (LRT station abbreviation CPV), a Light Rail Transit station in Sengkang, Singapore

== Other uses ==
- CPV-TV, a defunct UK media company
- Cape Verde, ISO 3166-1 alpha-3 country code
- Child-to-parent violence, parental abuse by children
- Common Procurement Vocabulary, a European Union system of codes used by member states in public procurement procedures
- Communist Party of Vietnam (Đảng Cộng sản Việt Nam), the ruling party of Vietnam
- Cost per view, in video online advertising
- Chinese People's Volunteers, an alternative name for the People’s Volunteer Army, the armed expeditionary forces deployed by the People's Republic of China during the Korean War
