= CFU =

CFU may refer to:

== Companies and organizations ==
=== United States ===
- Cedar Falls Utilities, a municipally owned public utility located in Cedar Falls, Iowa
- Croatian Fraternal Union, a Croatian diaspora club

=== Australia ===
- Ceramic Fuel Cells Ltd (ASX and LSX code), an Australian fuel cell technology company
- Community Fire Unit, a New South Wales-based residential volunteer fire protection organisation

=== Other countries ===
- Cambridge Fans United, fans of the English football team Cambridge United F.C.
- Canadian Freelance Union, a Canadian trade union for freelance media contributors
- Caribbean Football Union, the nominal governing body for Caribbean football
- Children's Film Unit, a British film production company & educational charity
- Commercial Farmers' Union, a trade union in Zimbabwe
- Crown Film Unit, the film production arm of the UK Ministry of Information during World War II

== Other uses ==
- Colony-forming unit, a measure of viable bacterial or fungal numbers in biology
- Corfu International Airport (IATA airport code), an airport on the Greek island of Corfu
- University training credit (It: credito formativo universitario, CFU) is an academic credit system in Italian universities.
