= C of I =

C of I may refer to:

- The College of Idaho
- The Church of Ireland
- Certificate of Indebtedness, a non-marketable United States Treasury security
