= Collaborative planning, forecasting, and replenishment =

Logistics methodology

Collaborative planning, forecasting, and replenishment (CPFR) is an approach to the supply chain process which focuses on joint practices. This is done through cooperative management of inventory through joint visibility and replenishment of products throughout the supply chain. Information shared between suppliers and retailers aids in satisfying customer demands through a system of shared information. This allows for continuous updating of inventory and upcoming requirements, making the end-to-end supply chain process more efficient. Efficiency is created through the decrease expenditures for merchandising, inventory, logistics, and transportation across all trading partners.

CPFR is a trademark of GS1 US.

== Origins ==
CPFR began as a 1995 initiative co-led by Wal-Mart's Vice President of Supply Chain, Chief Information Officer, Vice President of Application Development, and the Cambridge, Massachusetts software and strategy firm, Benchmarking Partners. The Open Source initiative was originally called CFAR (pronounced See-Far, for Collaborative Forecasting and Replenishment). According to an October 21, 1996 Business Week article entitled Clearing the Cobwebs from the Stockroom, New Internet software may make forecasting a snap, "Benchmarking developed CFAR with funding from Wal-Mart, IBM, SAP, and Manugistics. The latter two are makers of accounting and supply chain management software, respectively. To promote CFAR as a standard, Benchmarking has posted specifications on the Web and briefed more than 250 companies, including Sears, J.C. Penney, and Gillette. About 20 companies are implementing CFAR."

Warner Lambert (now part of Pfizer) served as the first pilot for CFAR. The pilot's results were publicly announced at a CFAR industry session at Harvard University, July 30, 1996 of executives from Wal-Mart's suppliers as well as other retailers and the Uniform Code Council. Benchmarking Partners then presented CFAR to the board of directors of the Voluntary Interindustry Commerce Standards Committee (VICS). VICS established an industry committee to prepare for rolling CFAR out as an international standard. The original committee was co-chaired by the vice president of customer marketing from Nabisco and the vice president of supply chain from Wal-Mart. Based on the suggestion of Procter & Gamble's vice president of supply chain, the standard was renamed CPFR to emphasize the role of planning.

The first publication of the VICS CPFR Voluntary Guidelines came out in 1998. Currently there are committees "to develop business guidelines and roadmaps for various collaborative scenarios, which include upstream suppliers, suppliers of finished goods and retailers, which integrate demand and supply planning and execution. The committee is continuing to improve the existing guidelines, tools and critical first steps that enable the implementation of CPFR." These committees gained experience from pilot studies which have occurred over the past six years. VICS continues to lead much of the research and implementation of CPFR through its guidelines and project investigations.

== CPFR model ==
CPFR was originally presented by VICS in their VICS CPFR Guidelines in 1998 as a nine-step (or data flow) process, starting with the collaborating businesses developing the agreement for collaboration. The nine steps were:

1. Develop Front End Agreement
2. Create the Joint Business Plan
3. Create the Sales Forecast
4. Identify Exceptions for Sales Forecast
5. Resolve/Collaborate on Exception Items
6. Create Order Forecast
7. Identify Exceptions for Order Forecast
8. Resolve/Collaborate on Exception Items
9. Order Generation

The CPFR model presents the aspects in which industries focus. The model provides a basic framework for the flow of information, goods, and services. In the retail industry the "retailer typically fills the buyer role, a manufacturer fills the seller role, and the consumer is the end customer." The center of the model is represented as the consumer, followed by the middle ring of the retailer, and finally the outside ring being the manufacturer. The consumer drives demand for goods and services while the retailer is the provider of goods and services. The manufacturer supplies the retailer stores with product as demand for product is pulled through the supply chain by the end user, being the consumer. The choice of demand forecasting method influences both supplier selection and planning of order allocation.

== See also ==
- Reference class forecasting
