= CFZ =

CFZ may refer to:

- Ca' Foscari University of Venice's cultural flow zone
- Centro de Futebol Zico Sociedade Esportiva
- Centro de Futebol Zico de Brasília Sociedade Esportiva
- Chabahar Free Zone, IRAN
- ExxonMobil's Controlled Freeze Zone technology
