= CHV =

CHV or Chv may refer to:

- Canine hepacivirus
- Chattahoochee Valley Railway
- Chilevisión, a Chilean television channel
- Crypohnectria hypovirus, a species of the genus Hypovirus
- Chuvash language, by ISO 639 code

== See also ==
- Channel V
