= CNE =

CNE may refer to:

- Canadian National Exhibition, Canadian fair
- Continuing nursing education
- Computer network exploitation, a type of military computer network operation
- Constructive neutral evolution
- Contrat nouvelle embauche, a type of employment contract

== Organizations ==
- Care New England, a hospital network
- Centre for the New Europe, a defunct think tank in Brussels
- Conference of New England, an athletic conference
- National Electoral Council (Colombia) (Consejo Nacional Electoral)
- National Electoral Council (Ecuador) (Consejo Nacional Electoral
- National Electoral Council (Honduras) (Consejo Nacional Electoral)
- National Electoral Council (Venezuela) (Consejo Nacional Electoral)
- Corpo Nacional de Escutas – Escutismo Católico Português, a Catholic scouting organization in Portugal

== Transportation ==
- Carnegie railway station, Melbourne, station code
- Central New England Railway, reporting mark
