= CHRS =

CHRS or Chrs may refer to:

- California Historical Radio Society
- Centre for Human Reproductive Science, Birmingham
- Charouz Racing System
- Chorasmian script, ISO 19524 code, see Khwarezmian language and Chorasmian (Unicode block)
