= CPAC =

CPAC may refer to:

== Conferences ==
- Conservative Political Action Conference, an annual conservative activist political conference in the US or other country
- Castle Point Anime Convention, an annual anime convention held in Hoboken, New Jersey, US

== Businesses and organizations ==
=== United States ===
- Carpenter Performing Arts Center, at California State University, Long Beach
- Colorado Photographic Arts Center, in Denver, Colorado
- Community Police Accountability Council, watchdog organization in Chicago, Illinois
- CPAC, Inc., former parent company of the Fuller Brush Company

=== Elsewhere ===
- Casula Powerhouse Arts Centre, Sydney, Australia
- Central Plains Athletic Conference, former name of the Manitoba Colleges Athletic Conference, Canada
- CPAC (TV channel) (Cable Public Affairs Channel), a Canadian specialty television channel
- Central Philippine Adventist College, educational institution in the Philippines
