= C2D =

C2D may refer to:

- Intel Core 2 Duo, a microprocessor line by Intel
- Crash to desktop, in computing, an event where a program exits abnormally
