= CCIR =

CCIR is a four-letter abbreviation that may stand for:

- California Coalition for Immigration Reform, a California political advocacy group for immigration reduction
- Campaign for Comprehensive Immigration Reform, a Washington, DC organization for immigrant rights
- Canadian Centre for Investigative Reporting, produces thoroughly researched reporting in the public interest
- Centre for Counseling Innovation and Research (CCIR), at Kish Island, Tehran, Mashhad
- Comité Consultatif International pour la Radio, a forerunner of the ITU-R
  - CCIR 601, the former name of a broadcasting standard promulgated by the CCIR
  - CCIR-tones, a selective calling system used in some radio communications systems in some European countries
  - CCIR-1k and CCIR-2k, noise weighting standards for audio signals
- Commander's critical information requirement, a term in the US military
