= Certified broadcast radio engineer =

Professional certification for radio engineers in the United States

Certified broadcast radio engineer (CBRE) is a title granted to an individual in the United States who successfully meets the experience and test requirements of the certification, regulated by the Society of Broadcast Engineers (SBE). The CBRE title is protected by copyright laws. Individuals who use this title without consent from the Society of Broadcast Engineers could face legal action.

The SBE certifications were created to recognize individuals who practice in career fields which are not regulated by state licensing or Professional Engineering programs. Broadcast Engineering is regulated at the national level and not by individual states.
