= Committee on the Public Understanding of Science =

British organisation

The Committee on the Public Understanding of Science or Copus was founded in 1985 by the British Association for the Advancement of Science (BAAS), the Royal Institution and the Royal Society. Copus came about as a result of the 'Bodmer Report' by the eminent geneticist Walter Bodmer. The aim of Copus was to interpret scientific advances and make them more accessible to non-scientists.

It played a part in developing the public understanding of science it establishing standards for communicating science and technology

The Copus Grant Schemes was set up in 1987 and the last round of grants was for 2003/4. The scheme was funded by the Office of Science and Technology and the Royal Society. 25 grants worth a total of over £750,000 were awarded in 2003/2004.

In 2000 The new Copus Council was formed to be a more inclusive partnership for science communication in the UK. In 2002 following a report commissioned by the Office of Science and Technology the Copus Council was discontinued.
