= Christian Real Estate Network =

North American professional network

- Company type: Private
- Industry: Real estate
- Founded: 2002
- Headquarters: Orange, California, United States
- Key people: Bart Smith, Founder/CEO; Justin Smith, Founder/President
- Website: hismove.com

Christian Real Estate Network (CREN) is an association that was started in January 2002 by Bart Smith and Justin Smith.

Bart Smith, a ReMax broker/owner since 1987, began the service as an affiliate marketing experiment in the Christian marketplace.

The service is a referral network that connects buyers and sellers with Christian Real Estate Agents in the United States and Canada. The Network consists of approximately 1,400 association members including real estate agents, loan officers, appraisers, property managers, property inspectors, and various other fields related to real estate.

(CREN) Maintains offices in Orange, California, and Castle Rock, Colorado, Colorado, and operates under a California-based corporation

== Sources ==
"Referrals From God" by Carol Lloyd, San Francisco Chronicle, April 29, 2005

"Christian Businesses Gain in Popularity" by Eunice Moscoso, Cox Newspapers, April 24, 2005

"Looking for a Christian Real Estate Agent?" Inman News, June 18, 2004

"Religious Real Estate Referral Sites: Sending the Wrong Word?" by Blanche Evans, Realty Times, December 16, 2002
