= L14 =

L14 or L-14 may refer to:

== Vehicles ==
Aircraft

- Daimler L14, a German fighter
- Lockheed L-14 Super Electra, an American passenger aircraft
- Piper L-14, an American military aircraft
- L-14, an L-class blimp of the United States Navy

Ships

- HMS L14, a submarine of the Royal Navy
- HMS Albion (L14), an amphibious assault ship of the Royal Navy
- HMS Beaufort (L14), a destroyer of the Royal Navy
- INS Ghorpad (L14), an amphibious warfare vessel of the Indian Navy
- Soviet submarine L-14, a Leninets-class submarine

== Other uses ==
- L14 (New York City bus)
- 60S ribosomal protein L14
- County Road L14 (Lyon County, Iowa)
- Lectionary 14, a 16th-century, Greek manuscript of the New Testament
- Nissan L14 engine, an automobile engine
