= Terminal uridylyltransferase 7 =

Protein-coding gene in the species Homo sapiens

TUT7

Identifiers
- Aliases: TUT7, PAPD6, zinc finger CCHC-type containing 6, TENT3B, ZCCHC6, terminal uridylyl transferase 7
- External IDs: OMIM: 613467; MGI: 2387179; GeneCards: TUT7
Enzyme activity
EC #	BRENDA	ExPASy	KEGG	MetaCyc
2.7.7.52	↗	↗	↗	↗

Gene location (Human)
Chr.	Chromosome 9 (human)
Band	9q21.33	Start	86,287,733 bp
Band	9q21.33	End	86,354,454 bp

Gene location (Mouse)
Chr.	Chromosome 13 (mouse)
Band	13|13 B2	Start	59,919,375 bp
Band	13|13 B2	End	59,970,961 bp
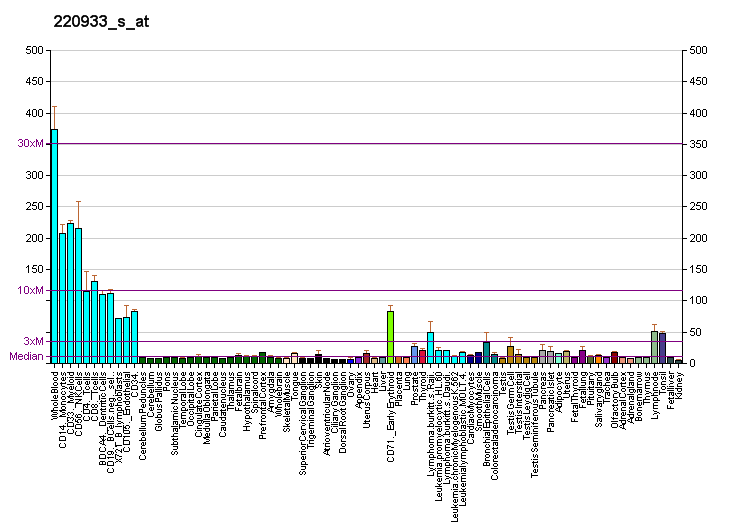
RNA expression pattern
Bgee	Human / Mouse (ortholog); Top expressed in: tendon of biceps brachii; blood; buccal mucosa cell; periodontal fiber; Achilles tendon; skin of thigh; monocyte; epithelium of nasopharynx; bone marrow cell; oral cavity / Top expressed in: basilar part of occipital bone; granulocyte; tibiofemoral joint; bone marrow; genital tubercle; jejunum; fetal liver hematopoietic progenitor cell; renal corpuscle; ileum; blood; More reference expression data
BioGPS	More reference expression data
Gene ontology
Molecular function	transferase activity; nucleotidyltransferase activity; zinc ion binding; metal ion binding; nucleic acid binding; RNA binding; RNA uridylyltransferase activity; protein binding; miRNA binding; uridylyltransferase activity
Cellular component	cytoplasm; nucleoplasm; cytosol
Biological process	histone mRNA catabolic process; RNA 3'-end processing; nuclear-transcribed mRNA poly(A) tail shortening; oocyte maturation; negative regulation of transposition, RNA-mediated; miRNA metabolic process; pre-miRNA processing; RNA 3' uridylation; polyuridylation-dependent mRNA catabolic process
Sources:Amigo / QuickGO
Orthologs
Databases	NCBI: entry; OMA: entry
Species	Human	Mouse
Entrez	79670	214290
Ensembl	ENSG00000083223	ENSMUSG00000035248
UniProt	Q5VYS8	Q5BLK4
RefSeq (mRNA)	NM_001185059; NM_001185074; NM_024617; NM_001330718	NM_153538; NM_001373962; NM_001373963; NM_001373964
RefSeq (protein)	NP_001171988; NP_001172003; NP_001317647; NP_078893	NP_705766; NP_001360891; NP_001360892; NP_001360893
Location (UCSC)	Chr 9: 86.29 – 86.35 Mb	Chr 13: 59.92 – 59.97 Mb
PubMed search
- Wikidata
View/Edit Human	View/Edit Mouse

Terminal uridylyltransferase 7 (TUT7), also known as zinc finger, CCHC domain containing 6 (ZCCHC6), is an enzyme that in humans is encoded by the TUT7 gene located on chromosome 9. The ZCCHC6 protein mediates the terminal uridylation of RNA transcripts with short poly-A tails and is involved in mRNA and microRNA degradation

== Structure ==
The ZCCHC6 gene contains 33 exons with at least six known isoforms due to alternative splicing. The ZCCHC6 gene encodes for a protein that is 171 kDa in molecular weight and is localized to the cytoplasm.

== Function ==
It catalyzes the following reaction, requiring Mg2+ and Mn2+ as co-factors.

UTP + RNA(n) = diphosphate + RNA(n+1)

Uridylation catalyzed by ZCCHC6 takes place readily on deadenylated mRNAs inside the cells. Purified ZCCHC6 selectively recognizes and uridylates RNA molecules possessing short poly(A) tails (less than 25 nucleotides) in vitro. In cells depleted of ZCCHC6, the majority of mRNAs lose the signature oligo(U) tails that are characteristic of ZCCHC6 reactivity, and the half-life of mRNA molecules are accordingly prolonged.

In addition to mRNA degradation, uridylation is also thought to function in pre-microRNA maturation, with some group II pre-microRNA requiring 3' mono-uridylation for Dicer processing. ZCCHC6 is thought to work in redundancy with ZCCHC11 to mediate the biogenesis of the let-7 microRNA through uridylation.

Genetic Inactivation of ZCCHC6 Suppresses Interleukin-6 Expression and Reduces the Severity of Experimental Osteoarthritis in Mice.
