= CIR =

CIR or Cir may refer to:

== Locations ==
- Christmas Island Resort, a casino/resort in the northeastern Indian Oceans
- CIR, FAA/IATA code for Cairo Regional Airport
- CIR, station code for the Caledonian Road & Barnsbury railway station in the UK

== Organizations ==
- Center for Individual Rights, a US non-profit public interest law firm
- Center for Investigative Reporting, a nonprofit journalism organization
- Christian Initiative Romero, a German non-profit organization supporting industrial law and human rights in Central America
- Cosmetic Ingredient Review, a consumer safety group

== Politics and government ==
- Commission on Industrial Relations, a US Congressional commission created in 1912 to study labor policy
- Commission Internationale de Ravitaillement, an inter-governmental body for coordinating purchases among Allies in World War I
- Commissioner of Internal Revenue, a US Treasury position
- Committee on International Relations, renamed the United States House Committee on Foreign Affairs in 2007
- Comprehensive Immigration Reform Act of 2006, a US Senate bill
- Convention of Republican Institutions, a defunct French political party
- Cyber and Information Domain Service, the cyber branch of Germany's military (German: Cyber- und Informationsraum)

== Science and medicine ==
- Carbon isotope ratio analysis, a subset of isotope ratio mass spectrometry
- Central ischaemic response, a cause of fainting
- Cir, abbreviation for the constellation Circinus
- CIR1, a gene that encodes the protein corepressor interacting with RBPJ in humans
- Corotating interaction region, the interface between fast and slow regions of the solar wind

== Technology ==
- Carrier-to-interference ratio, in radio transmission
- Color infrared film, in photography
- Combustion Integrated Rack, an International Space Station microgravity research tool
- Committed information rate, or minimum guaranteed bitrate, in telecommunications
- Consumer IR, a class of remote control and communication devices

== Other uses ==
- Campionato Italiano Rally (Italian Rally Championship), in automobile racing
- CIR, ICAO code for Arctic Circle Air, ICAO code
- CIR Group, an Italian holding company
- Committee on International Relations (University of Chicago), a graduate program
- Coordinator for International Relations, a position within the Japan Exchange and Teaching Program
- Cox–Ingersoll–Ross model, a model for interest rate dynamics
