= Poly(A) binding protein interacting protein 2B =

Protein-coding gene in the species Homo sapiens

PAIP2B
Available structures
| PDB | Ortholog search: PDBe RCSB |
| PDB | List of PDB id codes 1JGN, 3KUS, 3KUT |

Identifiers
- Aliases: PAIP2B, poly(A) binding protein interacting protein 2B
- External IDs: OMIM: 611018; MGI: 2386865; HomoloGene: 25798; GeneCards: PAIP2B; OMA:PAIP2B - orthologs

Gene location (Human)
| Chr. | Chromosome 2 (human) |
| Band | 2p13.3 | Start | 71,182,738 bp |
| Band | 2p13.3 | End | 71,227,103 bp |

Gene location (Mouse)
| Chr. | Chromosome 6 (mouse) |
| Band | 6|6 C3 | Start | 83,782,383 bp |
| Band | 6|6 C3 | End | 83,808,723 bp |
RNA expression pattern
| Bgee | Human / Mouse (ortholog); Top expressed in: corpus callosum; internal globus pallidus; inferior ganglion of vagus nerve; C1 segment; Skeletal muscle tissue of rectus abdominis; subthalamic nucleus; dorsal motor nucleus of vagus nerve; middle frontal gyrus; substantia nigra; optic nerve / Top expressed in: primary oocyte; lacrimal gland; parotid gland; zygote; secondary oocyte; sternocleidomastoid muscle; seminal vesicula; vestibular membrane of cochlear duct; extensor digitorum longus muscle; temporal muscle; More reference expression data |
| BioGPS | n/a |
Gene ontology
| Molecular function | protein binding; translation repressor activity, mRNA regulatory element binding |
| Cellular component | cytoplasm |
| Biological process | negative regulation of translational initiation; regulation of translation |
Sources:Amigo / QuickGO
Orthologs
| Species | Human | Mouse |
| Entrez | 400961 | 232164 |
| Ensembl | ENSG00000124374 | ENSMUSG00000045896 |
| UniProt | Q9ULR5 | Q91W45 |
| RefSeq (mRNA) | NM_020459 | NM_146169 |
| RefSeq (protein) | NP_065192 | NP_666281 |
| Location (UCSC) | Chr 2: 71.18 – 71.23 Mb | Chr 6: 83.78 – 83.81 Mb |
| PubMed search |
- Wikidata
| View/Edit Human | View/Edit Mouse |

Poly(A) binding protein interacting protein 2B is a protein that in humans is encoded by the PAIP2B gene. It is mainly expressed in the oocytes and fertilized eggs in mice.

== Function ==
Most mRNAs, except for histones, contain a 3-prime poly(A) tail. Poly(A)-binding protein (PABP; see MIM 604679) enhances translation by circularizing mRNA through its interaction with the translation initiation factor EIF4G1 (MIM 600495) and the poly(A) tail. Various PABP-binding proteins regulate PABP activity, including PAIP1 (MIM 605184), a translational stimulator, and PAIP2A (MIM 605604) and PAIP2B, translational inhibitors .
