= PABPC3 =

Protein-coding gene in the species Homo sapiens

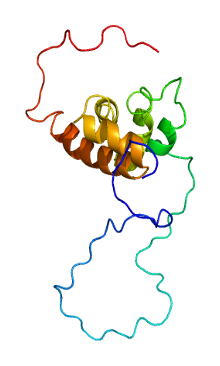

Identifiers
- Aliases: PABPC3, PABP3, PABPL3, tPABP, poly(A) binding protein cytoplasmic 3
- External IDs: OMIM: 604680; GeneCards: PABPC3
Available structures
PDB	Human UniProt search: PDBe RCSB
PDB	List of PDB id codes 4IVE

Gene location (Human)
Chr.	Chromosome 13 (human)
Band	13q12.13	Start	25,096,136 bp
Band	13q12.13	End	25,099,254 bp
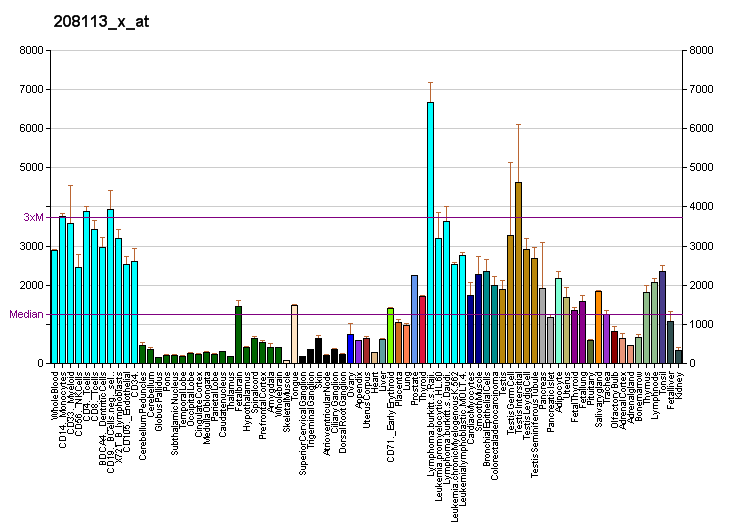

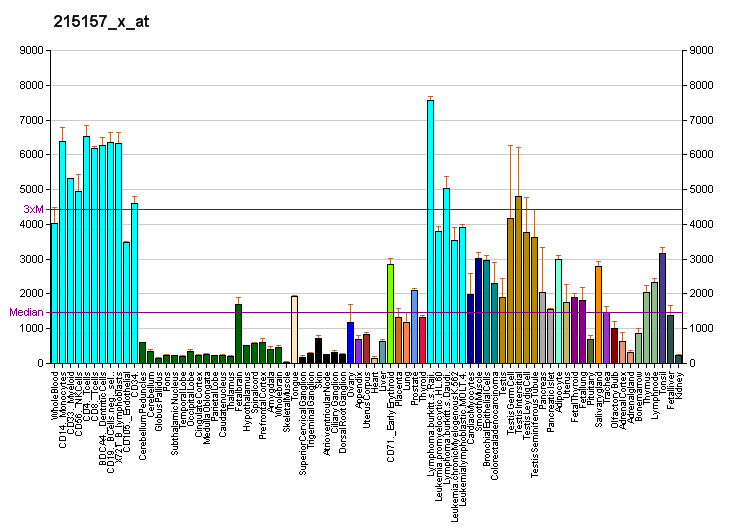
RNA expression pattern
Bgee	Human / Mouse (ortholog); Top expressed in: parotid gland; epithelium of nasopharynx; amniotic fluid; pancreatic ductal cell; seminal vesicula; pylorus; lactiferous duct; buccal mucosa cell; oral cavity; vulva / n/a; More reference expression data
BioGPS	More reference expression data
Gene ontology
Molecular function	poly(A) binding; RNA binding; nucleic acid binding; mRNA 3'-UTR binding; poly(U) RNA binding
Cellular component	cytoplasm; extracellular exosome; cytosol; nucleus; cytoplasmic stress granule; ribonucleoprotein complex
Biological process	mRNA metabolic process
Sources:Amigo / QuickGO
Orthologs
Databases	NCBI: entry; OMA: entry
Species	Human	Mouse
Entrez	5042	n/a
Ensembl	ENSG00000151846	n/a
UniProt	Q9H361	n/a
RefSeq (mRNA)	NM_030979	n/a
RefSeq (protein)	NP_112241	n/a
Location (UCSC)	Chr 13: 25.1 – 25.1 Mb	n/a
PubMed search		n/a
- Wikidata
View/Edit Human

Polyadenylate-binding protein 3 is a protein that in humans is encoded by the PABPC3 gene. PABPC3 is a member of a larger family of poly(A)-binding proteins in the human genome.
