= SNW1 =

Protein-coding gene in the species Homo sapiens

Identifiers
- Aliases: SNW1, Bx42, NCOA-62, PRPF45, Prp45, SKIIP, SKIP, SNW domain containing 1, SKIP1, FUN20
- External IDs: OMIM: 603055; MGI: 1913604; GeneCards: SNW1

Gene location (Human)
Chr.	Chromosome 14 (human)
Band	14q24.3	Start	77,717,599 bp
Band	14q24.3	End	77,761,207 bp

Gene location (Mouse)
Chr.	Chromosome 12 (mouse)
Band	12|12 D2	Start	87,495,845 bp
Band	12|12 D2	End	87,519,044 bp
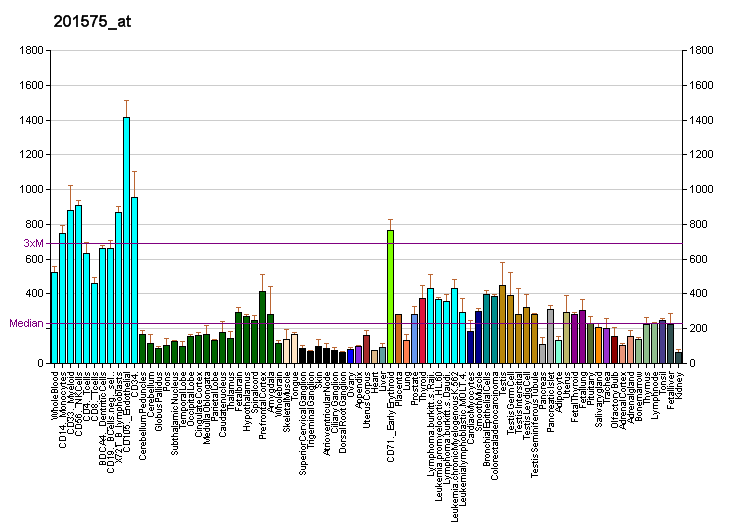

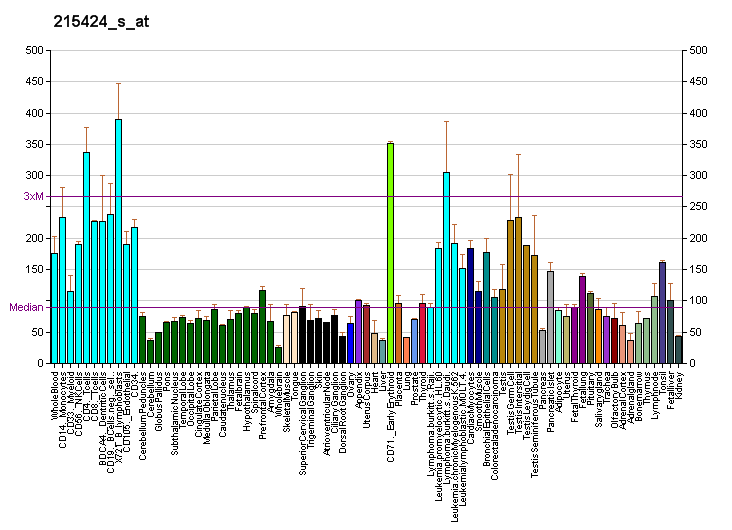
RNA expression pattern
Bgee	Human / Mouse (ortholog); Top expressed in: epithelium of nasopharynx; parotid gland; Achilles tendon; amniotic fluid; parietal pleura; tendon of biceps brachii; germinal epithelium; trabecular bone; tibia; vena cava / Top expressed in: renal corpuscle; Epithelium of choroid plexus; retinal pigment epithelium; medullary collecting duct; ureter; motor neuron; maxillary prominence; primitive streak; ventricular zone; genital tubercle; More reference expression data
BioGPS	More reference expression data
Gene ontology
Molecular function	transcription corepressor activity; transcription coactivator activity; Notch binding; protein binding; retinoic acid receptor binding; SMAD binding; vitamin D receptor binding; RNA binding; enzyme binding; androgen receptor binding
Cellular component	catalytic step 2 spliceosome; nuclear matrix; nucleoplasm; cyclin/CDK positive transcription elongation factor complex; spliceosomal complex; nucleus; nuclear body; post-mRNA release spliceosomal complex; nuclear speck; U2-type catalytic step 2 spliceosome
Biological process	Notch signaling pathway; cellular response to retinoic acid; positive regulation of transforming growth factor beta receptor signaling pathway; intrinsic apoptotic signaling pathway in response to DNA damage by p53 class mediator; regulation of transcription, DNA-templated; positive regulation of mRNA splicing, via spliceosome; regulation of retinoic acid receptor signaling pathway; regulation of transcription by RNA polymerase II; mRNA processing; regulation of vitamin D receptor signaling pathway; negative regulation of transcription by RNA polymerase II; positive regulation of neurogenesis; retinoic acid receptor signaling pathway; positive regulation of histone H3-K4 methylation; RNA splicing; positive regulation of vitamin D receptor signaling pathway; transcription initiation from RNA polymerase II promoter; viral process; negative regulation of transcription, DNA-templated; positive regulation by host of viral transcription; positive regulation of transcription by RNA polymerase II; transcription, DNA-templated; mRNA splicing, via spliceosome; generation of catalytic spliceosome for second transesterification step; positive regulation of transcription of Notch receptor target; positive regulation of Notch signaling pathway
Sources:Amigo / QuickGO
Orthologs
Databases	NCBI: entry; OMA: entry
Species	Human	Mouse
Entrez	22938	66354
Ensembl	ENSG00000100603	ENSMUSG00000021039
UniProt	Q13573	Q9CSN1
RefSeq (mRNA)	NM_012245; NM_001318844	NM_025507
RefSeq (protein)	NP_001305773; NP_036377	NP_079783
Location (UCSC)	Chr 14: 77.72 – 77.76 Mb	Chr 12: 87.5 – 87.52 Mb
PubMed search
- Wikidata
View/Edit Human	View/Edit Mouse

SNW domain-containing protein 1 is a protein that in humans is encoded by the SNW1 gene.

== Function ==
This gene, a member of the SNW gene family, encodes a coactivator that enhances transcription from some Pol II promoters. This coactivator can bind to the ligand-binding domain of the vitamin D receptor and to retinoid receptors to enhance vitamin D-, retinoic acid-, estrogen-, and glucocorticoid-mediated gene expression. It can also function as a splicing factor by interacting with poly(A)-binding protein 2 to directly control the expression of muscle-specific genes at the transcriptional level. Finally, the protein may be involved in oncogenesis since it interacts with a region of SKI oncoproteins that is required for transforming activity.

== Interactions ==
SNW1 has been shown to interact with:

- CIR1,
- Calcitriol receptor,
- Histone deacetylase 2,
- Mothers against decapentaplegic homolog 2,
- Mothers against decapentaplegic homolog 3,
- NOTCH1
- Nuclear receptor co-repressor 2,
- Nuclear receptor coactivator 1,
- PABPN1,
- RBPJ,
- Retinoblastoma protein, and
- SKI protein.
