= PABPC5 =

Protein-coding gene in the species Homo sapiens

Identifiers
- Aliases: PABPC5, PABP5, poly(A) binding protein cytoplasmic 5
- External IDs: OMIM: 300407; MGI: 2136401; GeneCards: PABPC5

Gene location (Human)
Chr.	X chromosome (human)
Band	Xq21.31	Start	91,434,595 bp
Band	Xq21.31	End	91,438,584 bp

Gene location (Mouse)
Chr.	X chromosome (mouse)
Band	X|X E1	Start	118,836,893 bp
Band	X|X E1	End	118,839,862 bp
RNA expression pattern
Bgee	Human / Mouse (ortholog); Top expressed in: Achilles tendon; right adrenal cortex; left adrenal gland; left adrenal cortex; smooth muscle tissue; ventricular zone; testicle; left ovary; islet of Langerhans; right ovary / Top expressed in: embryo; dentate gyrus of hippocampal formation granule cell; superior frontal gyrus; primary visual cortex; cerebellar cortex; neural tube; lens; mesencephalon; hippocampus proper; olfactory bulb; More reference expression data
BioGPS	n/a
Orthologs
Databases	NCBI: entry; OMA: entry
Species	Human	Mouse
Entrez	140886	93728
Ensembl	ENSG00000174740	ENSMUSG00000034732
UniProt	Q96DU9	Q8C7D3
RefSeq (mRNA)	NM_080832	NM_053114
RefSeq (protein)	NP_543022	NP_444344
Location (UCSC)	Chr X: 91.43 – 91.44 Mb	Chr X: 118.84 – 118.84 Mb
PubMed search
- Wikidata
View/Edit Human	View/Edit Mouse

Poly(A) binding protein cytoplasmic 5 is a protein that in humans is encoded by the PABPC5 gene.

== Function ==
This gene encodes a poly(A)-binding protein that binds to the polyA tail found at the 3' end of most eukaryotic mRNAs. It is thought to play a role in the regulation of mRNA metabolic processes in the cytoplasm. This gene is located in a gene-poor region within the X-specific 13d-sY43 subinterval of the chromosome Xq21.3/Yp11.2 homology block. It is located close to translocation breakpoints associated with premature ovarian failure, and is therefore a potential candidate gene for this disorder. [provided by RefSeq, May 2010].
