= PHLDA1 =

Protein-coding gene in the species Homo sapiens

Identifiers
- Aliases: PHLDA1, DT1P1B11, PHRIP, TDAG51, pleckstrin homology like domain family A member 1
- External IDs: OMIM: 605335; MGI: 1096880; HomoloGene: 7203; GeneCards: PHLDA1; OMA:PHLDA1 - orthologs

Gene location (Human)
| Chr. | Chromosome 12 (human) |
| Band | 12q21.2 | Start | 76,025,447 bp |
| Band | 12q21.2 | End | 76,031,776 bp |

Gene location (Mouse)
| Chr. | Chromosome 10 (mouse) |
| Band | 10|10 D1 | Start | 111,342,147 bp |
| Band | 10|10 D1 | End | 111,344,506 bp |
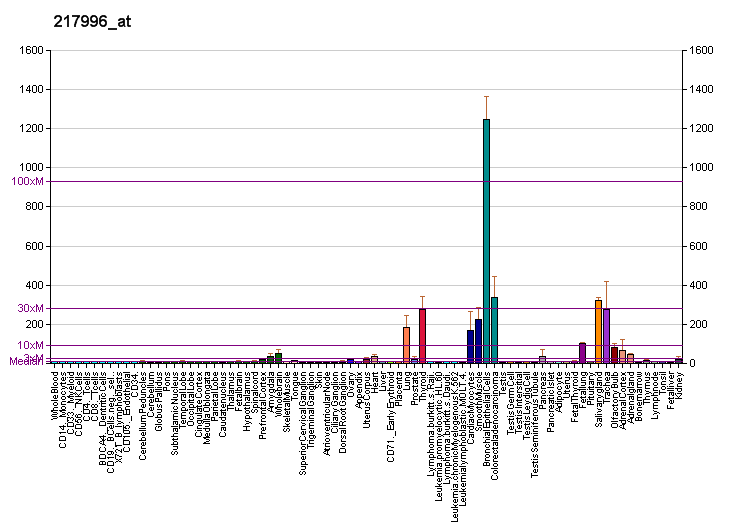

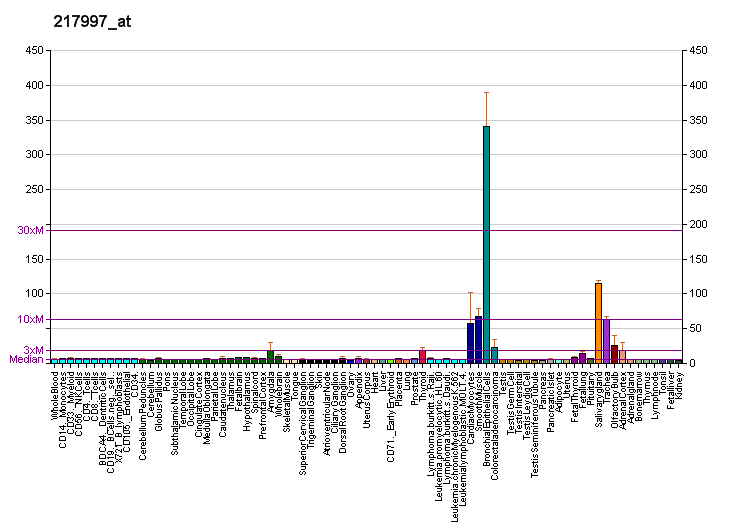

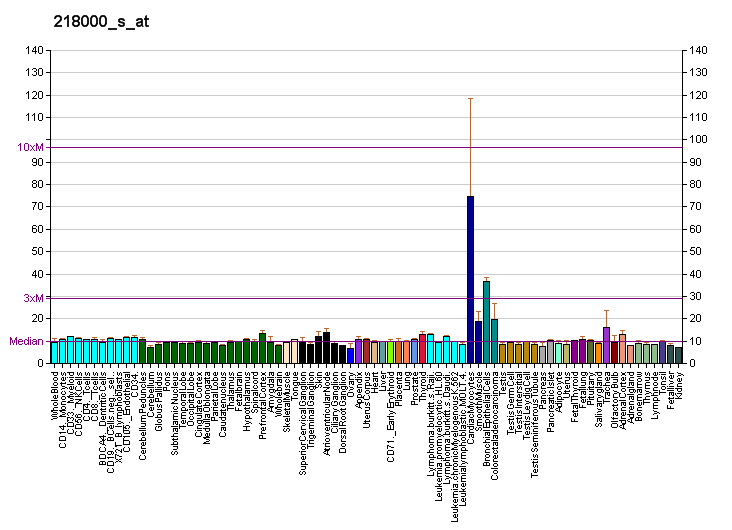
RNA expression pattern
| Bgee | Human / Mouse (ortholog); Top expressed in: ventricular zone; stromal cell of endometrium; ganglionic eminence; salivary gland; minor salivary glands; gallbladder; vagina; right lung; tibial nerve; upper lobe of left lung / Top expressed in: parotid gland; submandibular gland; lacrimal gland; left lobe of liver; otic placode; lactiferous gland; crypt of lieberkuhn of small intestine; epithelium of stomach; granulocyte; stria vascularis; More reference expression data |
| BioGPS | More reference expression data |
Gene ontology
| Molecular function | protein binding |
| Cellular component | cytoplasm; cytoplasmic vesicle; cytosol; nucleus; nucleolus |
| Biological process | apoptotic process; FasL biosynthetic process; G2/M transition of mitotic cell cycle |
Sources:Amigo / QuickGO
Orthologs
| Species | Human | Mouse |
| Entrez | 22822 | 21664 |
| Ensembl | ENSG00000139289 | ENSMUSG00000020205 |
| UniProt | Q8WV24 | Q62392 |
| RefSeq (mRNA) | NM_007350 | NM_009344 |
| RefSeq (protein) | NP_031376 | NP_033370 |
| Location (UCSC) | Chr 12: 76.03 – 76.03 Mb | Chr 10: 111.34 – 111.34 Mb |
| PubMed search |
- Wikidata
| View/Edit Human | View/Edit Mouse |

Pleckstrin homology-like domain family A member 1 (PHLDA1) is a protein that in humans is encoded by the PHLDA1 gene.

This gene encodes an evolutionarily conserved proline-histidine rich nuclear protein. The encoded protein may play an important role in the anti-apoptotic effects of insulin-like growth factor-1.

== Interactions ==
PHLDA1 has been shown to interact with RPL14, EIF3D and PABPC4.
