= PABPC4 =

Protein-coding gene in humans

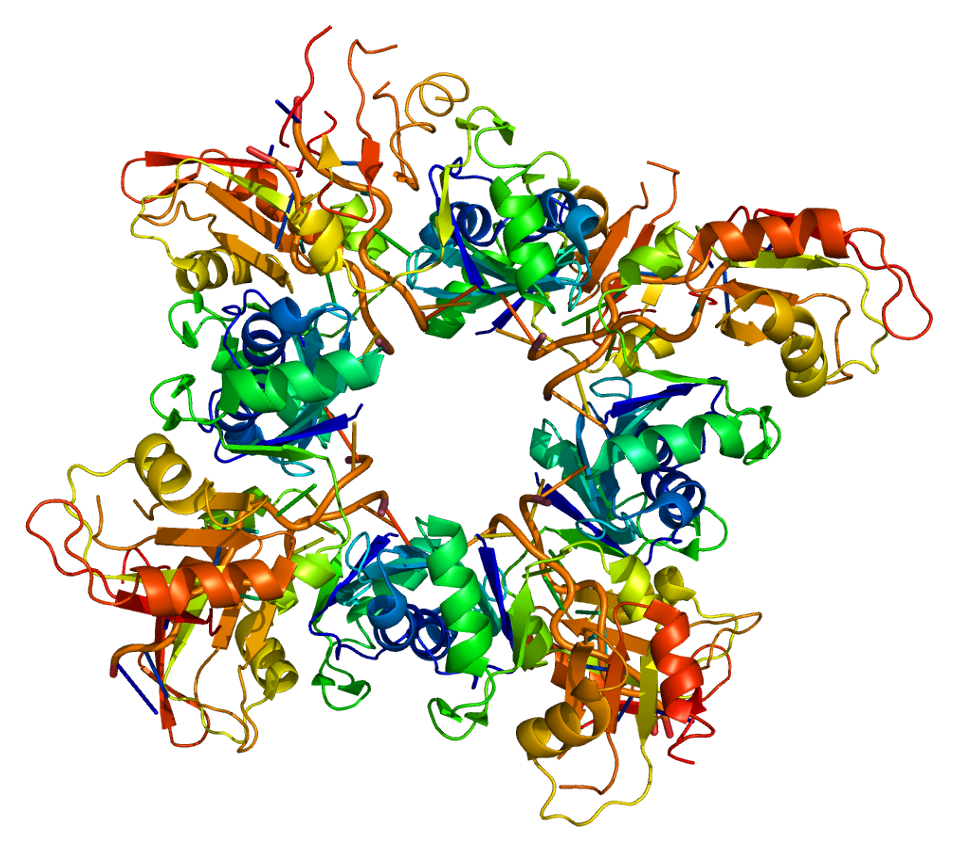

Identifiers
- Aliases: PABPC4, APP-1, APP1, PABP4, iPABP, poly(A) binding protein cytoplasmic 4
- External IDs: OMIM: 603407; MGI: 2385206; GeneCards: PABPC4

Gene location (Human)
Chr.	Chromosome 1 (human)
Band	1p34.3	Start	39,560,709 bp
Band	1p34.3	End	39,576,790 bp

Gene location (Mouse)
Chr.	Chromosome 4 (mouse)
Band	4|4 D2.2	Start	123,156,144 bp
Band	4|4 D2.2	End	123,192,718 bp
RNA expression pattern
Bgee	Human / Mouse (ortholog); Top expressed in: body of pancreas; gastrocnemius muscle; muscle of thigh; secondary oocyte; glutes; skeletal muscle tissue; vastus lateralis muscle; body of tongue; triceps brachii muscle; left ovary / Top expressed in: bone marrow; epiblast; muscle of thigh; skeletal muscle tissue; tail of embryo; quadriceps femoris muscle; morula; yolk sac; genital tubercle; primary oocyte; More reference expression data
BioGPS	More reference expression data
Gene ontology
Molecular function	poly(C) RNA binding; protein binding; poly(A) binding; nucleic acid binding; poly(U) RNA binding; RNA binding; mRNA binding; mRNA 3'-UTR binding
Cellular component	cytoplasmic stress granule; nucleus; cytoplasm; cytosol; ribonucleoprotein complex
Biological process	RNA processing; RNA catabolic process; blood coagulation; protein biosynthesis; regulation of mRNA stability; myeloid cell development
Sources:Amigo / QuickGO
Orthologs
Databases	NCBI: entry; OMA: entry
Species	Human	Mouse
Entrez	8761	230721
Ensembl	ENSG00000090621	ENSMUSG00000011257
UniProt	Q13310	n/a
RefSeq (mRNA)	NM_003819; NM_001135653; NM_001135654	NM_130881; NM_148917; NM_001356377
RefSeq (protein)	NP_001129125; NP_001129126; NP_003810	n/a
Location (UCSC)	Chr 1: 39.56 – 39.58 Mb	Chr 4: 123.16 – 123.19 Mb
PubMed search
- Wikidata
View/Edit Human	View/Edit Mouse

Polyadenylate-binding protein 4 (PABPC4) is a protein that in humans is encoded by the PABPC4 gene.

== Function ==
Poly(A)-binding proteins (PABPs) bind to the poly(A) tail present at the 3-prime ends of most eukaryotic mRNAs. PABPC4 or IPABP (inducible PABP) was isolated as an activation-induced T-cell mRNA encoding a protein. Activation of T cells increased PABPC4 mRNA levels in T cells approximately 5-fold. PABPC4 contains 4 RNA-binding domains and proline-rich C terminus. PABPC4 is localized primarily to the cytoplasm. It is suggested that PABPC4 might be necessary for regulation of stability of labile mRNA species in activated T cells. PABPC4 was also identified as an antigen, APP1 (activated-platelet protein-1), expressed on thrombin-activated rabbit platelets. PABPC4 may also be involved in the regulation of protein translation in platelets and megakaryocytes or may participate in the binding or stabilization of polyadenylates in platelet dense granules.

== Interactions ==
PABPC4 has been shown to interact with PHLDA1.
