= Poly(A)-binding protein =

RNA binding protein

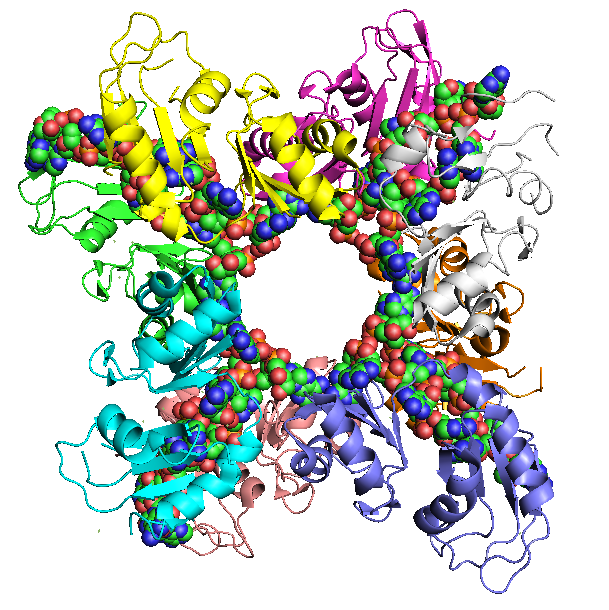
Poly(A) RNA binding protein PABP (PDB 1CVJ)

Poly(A)-binding protein (PAB or PABP) is an RNA-binding protein which triggers the binding of eukaryotic initiation factor 4 complex (eIF4G) directly to the poly(A) tail of mRNA which is 200-250 nucleotides long. The poly(A) tail is located on the 3' end of mRNA and was discovered by Mary Edmonds, who also characterized the poly-A polymerase enzyme that generates the poly(a) tail. The binding protein is also involved in mRNA precursors by helping polyadenylate polymerase add the poly(A) nucleotide tail to the pre-mRNA before translation. The nuclear isoform selectively binds to around 50 nucleotides and stimulates the activity of polyadenylate polymerase by increasing its affinity towards RNA. Poly(A)-binding protein is also present during stages of mRNA metabolism including nonsense-mediated decay and nucleocytoplasmic trafficking. The poly(A)-binding protein may also protect the tail from degradation and regulate mRNA production. Without these two proteins in-tandem, then the poly(A) tail would not be added and the RNA would degrade quickly.

== Structure ==
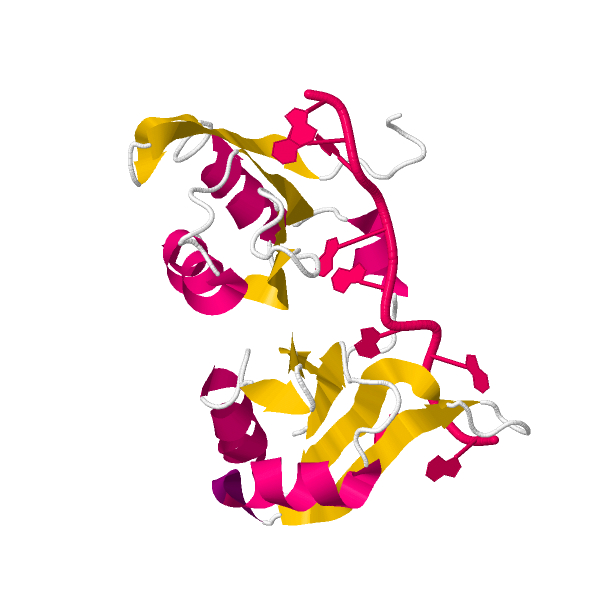
RRM 1 and 2 connected by a short linker showing binding to the polyadenylate RNA.

Cytosolic poly-A binding protein (PABPC) is made up of four RNA recognition motifs (RRMs) and a C-terminal region known as the PABC domain. RRM is the most common motifs for RNA recognition and is usually made up of 90-100 amino acids. Previous solution NMR and X-ray crystallography studies have shown that RRMs are globular domains, each composed of 4 anti-parallel β sheets that are backed by 2 α-helices. The central two β-strands, connected by a short linker, of each RRM forms a trough-like surface that is thought to be responsible for binding to the poly(A) oligonucleotides. The polyadenylate RNA adopts an extended conformation running the length of the molecular trough. Adenine recognition is primarily mediated by contacts with conserved residues found in the RNP motifs of the two RRMs. In vitro studies have shown the binding affinities to be on the order of 2-7nM, while affinity for poly(U), poly(G), and poly(C) were reportedly lower or undetectable in comparison. This shows that the poly(A)-binding protein is specific to poly(A) oligonucleotides and not others. Since the two central β-strands are used for poly(A) oligonucleotide binding, the other face of the protein is free for protein-protein interactions.

The PABC domain is approximately 75 amino acids and consists of 4 or 5 α-helices depending on the organism – human PABCs have 5, while yeast has been observed to have 4. This domain does not contact RNA, and instead, it recognizes 15 residues sequences that are a part of the PABP interaction motif (PAM-2) found on such proteins as eukaryotic translation termination factor (eRF3) and PABP interacting proteins 1 and 2 (PAIP 1, PAIP2).

The structure of human poly(A)-binding protein found in the nucleus (PABPN1) has yet to be well determined but it has been shown to contain a single RRM domain and an arginine rich carboxy terminal domain. They are thought to be structurally and functionally different from poly-A binding proteins found in the cytosol.

== Expression and binding ==
The expression of mammalian poly(A)-binding protein is regulated at the translational level by a feed-back mechanism: the mRNA encoding PABP contains in its 5' UTR an A-rich sequence which binds poly(A)-binding protein. This leads to autoregulatory repression of translation of PABP.

The cytosolic isoform of eukaryotic poly(A)-binding protein binds to the initiation factor eIF4G via its C-terminal domain. eIF4G is a component of the eIF4F complex, containing eIF4E, another initiation factor bound to the 5' cap on the 5' end of mRNA. This binding forms the characteristic loop structure of eukaryotic protein synthesis. Poly(A)-binding proteins in the cytosol compete for the eIF4G binding sites. This interaction enhances both the affinity of eIF4E for the cap structure and PABP1 for poly(A), effectively locking proteins onto both ends of the mRNA. As a result, this association may in part underlie the ability of PABP1 to promote small ribosomal (40S) subunit recruitment, which is aided by the interaction between eIF4G and eIF3. Poly(A)-binding protein has also been shown to interact with a termination factor (eRF3). The eRF3/PABP1 interaction may promote recycling of terminating ribosomes from the 3' to 5' end, facilitating multiple rounds of initiation on an mRNA. Alternatively, it may link translation to mRNA decay, as eRF3 appears to interfere with the ability of PABP1 to multimerise/form on poly(A), potentially leading to PABP1 dissociation, deadenylation and, ultimately, turnover.

== Rotavirus NSP3 ==
Cellular vs rotavirus translation

Rotavirus RNA-binding protein NSP3 interacts with eIF4GI and evicts the poly(A) binding protein from eIF4F. NSP3A by taking the place of PABP on eIF4GI, is responsible for the shut-off of cellular protein synthesis. Rotavirus mRNAs terminate a 3’ GACC motif that is recognized by the viral protein NSP3. This is the location where NSP3 competes with poly(A)-binding protein for eIF4G binding.

Once rotavirus infection occurs viral GACC-tailed mRNAs are translated while the poly(A)-tailed mRNA is severely impaired. In infected cells, there have been high magnitudes of both translation induction (GACC-tailed mRNA) and reduction (poly(A)-tailed mRNA) both dependent on the rotavirus strain. These data suggest that NSP3 is a translational surrogate of the PABP-poly(A) complex; therefore, it cannot by itself be responsible for inhibiting the translation of host poly(A)-tailed mRNAs upon rotavirus infection.

PABP-C1 evicted from eIF4G by NSP3 accumulates in the nucleus of rotavirus-infected cells. This eviction process requires rotavirus NSP3, eIF4G, and RoXaN. To better understand the interaction, modeling of the NSP3-RoXaN complex, demonstrates mutations in NSP3 interrupt this complex without compromising NSP3 interaction with eIF4G. The nuclear localization of PABP-C1 is dependent on the capacity of NSP3 to interact with eIF4G and also requires the interaction of NSP3 with a specific region in RoXaN, the leucine- and aspartic acid-rich (LD) domain. RoXaN is identified as a cellular partner of NSP3 involved in the nucleocytoplasmic localization of PABP-C1.

== Associated diseases ==
=== OPMD ===
Oculopharyngeal muscular dystrophy (OPMD) is a genetic condition that occurs in adulthood often after the age of 40. This disorder usually leads to weaker facial muscles oftentimes showing as progressive eyelid drooping, swallowing difficulties, and proximal limb muscle weakness such as weak leg and hip muscles. People with this disorder are often hindered to the point that they have to use a cane in order to walk. OPMD has been reported in approximately 29 countries and the number affected varies widely by specific population. The disease can be inherited as an autosomal dominant or recessive trait.

=== Mutations ===
Mutations of poly(A)-binding protein nuclear 1 (PABPN1) can cause OPMD (oculopharyngeal muscular dystrophy). What makes the PABPN1 protein so different than all other genes with disease causing expanded polyalanine tracts, is that it is not a transcription factor. Instead, PABPN1 is involved in the polyadenylation of mRNA precursors.

Mutations in PABPN1 that cause this disorder, result when the protein has an extended polyalanine tract (12-17 alanines long vs. the expected amount of 10). The extra alanines cause PABPN1 to aggregate and form clumps within muscles because they are not able to be broken down. These clumps are believed to disrupt the normal function of muscle cells which eventually lead to cell death. This progressive loss of muscle cells most likely causes the weakness in muscles seen in patients with OPMD. It is still not known why this disorder only affects certain muscles like the upper leg and hip. In recent studies on OPMD in Drosophila, it has been shown that the degeneration of muscles within those who are affected may not solely be due to the expanded polyalanine tract. It may actually be due to the RNA-binding domain and its function in binding.

=== Studies ===
As of November 2015, significant effort has been dedicated to researching OPMD and potential treatment methods. Myoblast Transplantation has been suggested and is in fact in clinical trials in France. This is done by taking myoblasts from a normal muscle cell and putting them into pharyngeal muscles and allowing them to develop to help form new muscle cells. There has also been testing of compounds, either existing or developed, to see if they might combat OPMD and its symptoms. Trehalose is a special form of sugar that has shown reduced aggregate formation and delayed pathology in the mouse model of OPMD. Doxycycline also played a similar role in delaying toxicity of OPMD in mouse models most likely due to stopping aggregate formation and reduced apoptosis. Many other compounds and methods are currently being researched and showing some success in clinical trials leading to optimism in curing this disease.

== Genes ==
Multiple human genes encode different protein isoforms and paralogs of PABP, including PABPN1, PABPC1, PABPC3, PABPC4, PABPC5.
