= Zinc finger protein 695 =

Protein found in humans

ZNF695

Identifiers
- Aliases: ZNF695, SBZF3, zinc finger protein 695
- External IDs: OMIM: 616348; GeneCards: ZNF695

Gene location (Human)
Chr.	Chromosome 1 (human)
Band	1q44	Start	246,945,547 bp
Band	1q44	End	247,008,093 bp
RNA expression pattern
Bgee	Human / Mouse (ortholog); Top expressed in: gonad; testicle; ganglionic eminence; ventricular zone; sural nerve; stromal cell of endometrium; mucosa of transverse colon; placenta; rectum; bone marrow / n/a; More reference expression data
BioGPS	n/a
Gene ontology
Molecular function	metal ion binding; nucleic acid binding; protein binding; DNA-binding transcription factor activity, RNA polymerase II-specific
Cellular component	intracellular anatomical structure; nucleus
Biological process	regulation of transcription, DNA-templated; regulation of transcription by RNA polymerase II
Sources:Amigo / QuickGO
Orthologs
Databases	NCBI: entry; OMA: entry
Species	Human	Mouse
Entrez	57116	n/a
Ensembl	ENSG00000197472	n/a
UniProt	Q8IW36	n/a
RefSeq (mRNA)	NM_001204221; NM_020394	n/a
RefSeq (protein)	NP_001191150; NP_065127	n/a
Location (UCSC)	Chr 1: 246.95 – 247.01 Mb	n/a
PubMed search		n/a
- Wikidata
View/Edit Human

Zinc finger protein 695 is a protein that in humans is encoded by the ZNF695 gene.

== See also ==
- ZNF692
