= Oculopharyngeal muscular dystrophy =

- Other names: Muscular dystrophy, oculopharyngeal
- Autosomal dominant in majority of cases (autosomal recessive minority)
- Specialty: Neurology
- Symptoms: Dysphagia
- Causes: Mutations on the PABPN1 gene
- Diagnostic method: Muscle biopsy
- Treatment: Orthopedic devices for management
- Frequency: 0.0001% (United Kingdom)

Oculopharyngeal muscular dystrophy (OPMD) is a rare form of muscular dystrophy with symptoms generally starting when an individual is 40 to 50 years old. It can be autosomal dominant neuromuscular disease or autosomal recessive. The most common inheritance of OPMD is autosomal dominant, which means only one copy of the mutated gene needs to be present in each cell. Children of an affected parent have a 50% chance of inheriting the mutant gene.

Autosomal dominant inheritance is the most common form of inheritance. Less commonly, OPMD can be inherited in an autosomal recessive pattern, which means that two copies of the mutated gene need to be present in each cell, both parents need to be carriers of the mutated gene and usually show no signs or symptoms. The PABPN1 mutation contains a GCG trinucleotide repeat at the 5' end of the coding region, and expansion of this repeat which then leads to autosomal dominant oculopharyngeal muscular dystrophy (OPMD) disease.

== Signs and symptoms ==
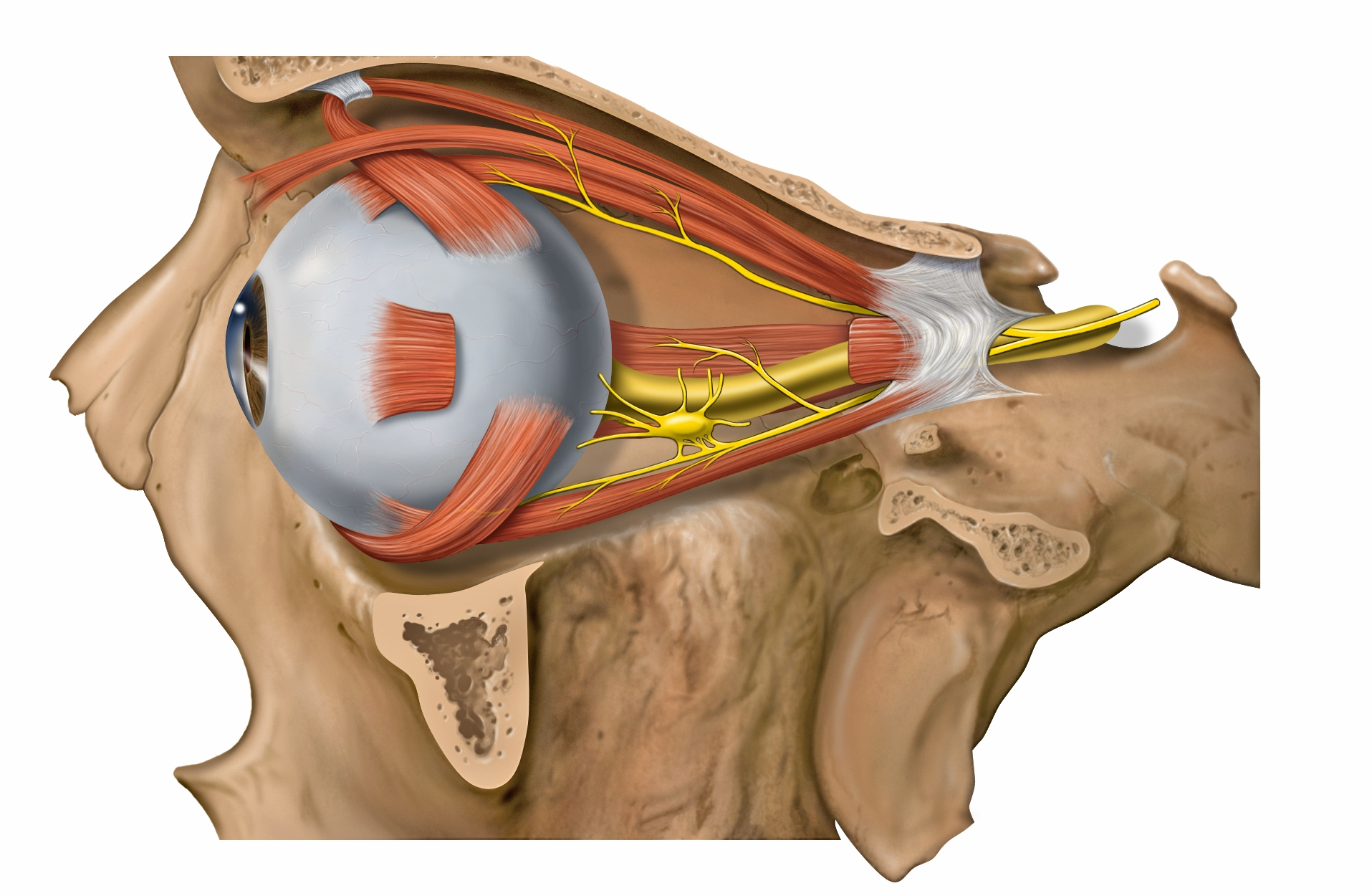
Extraocular muscles are shown in this image of the left eye (lateral view). Click on the structures for more information.

In terms of the signs (and symptoms) of oculopharyngeal muscular dystrophy would be consistent with the following:

- Ptosis
- Weakness of the extraocular muscles
- Dysphagia
- Aspiration pneumonia (complication)
- Proximal limb weakness

Though the aforementioned signs/symptoms are the most common, there have been cases though rare, where the peripheral nervous system has had involvement with significant reduction of myelinated fibers.

In homozygous cases, this muscular dystrophy is severe and starts earlier in the affected individual's life.

== Genetics ==
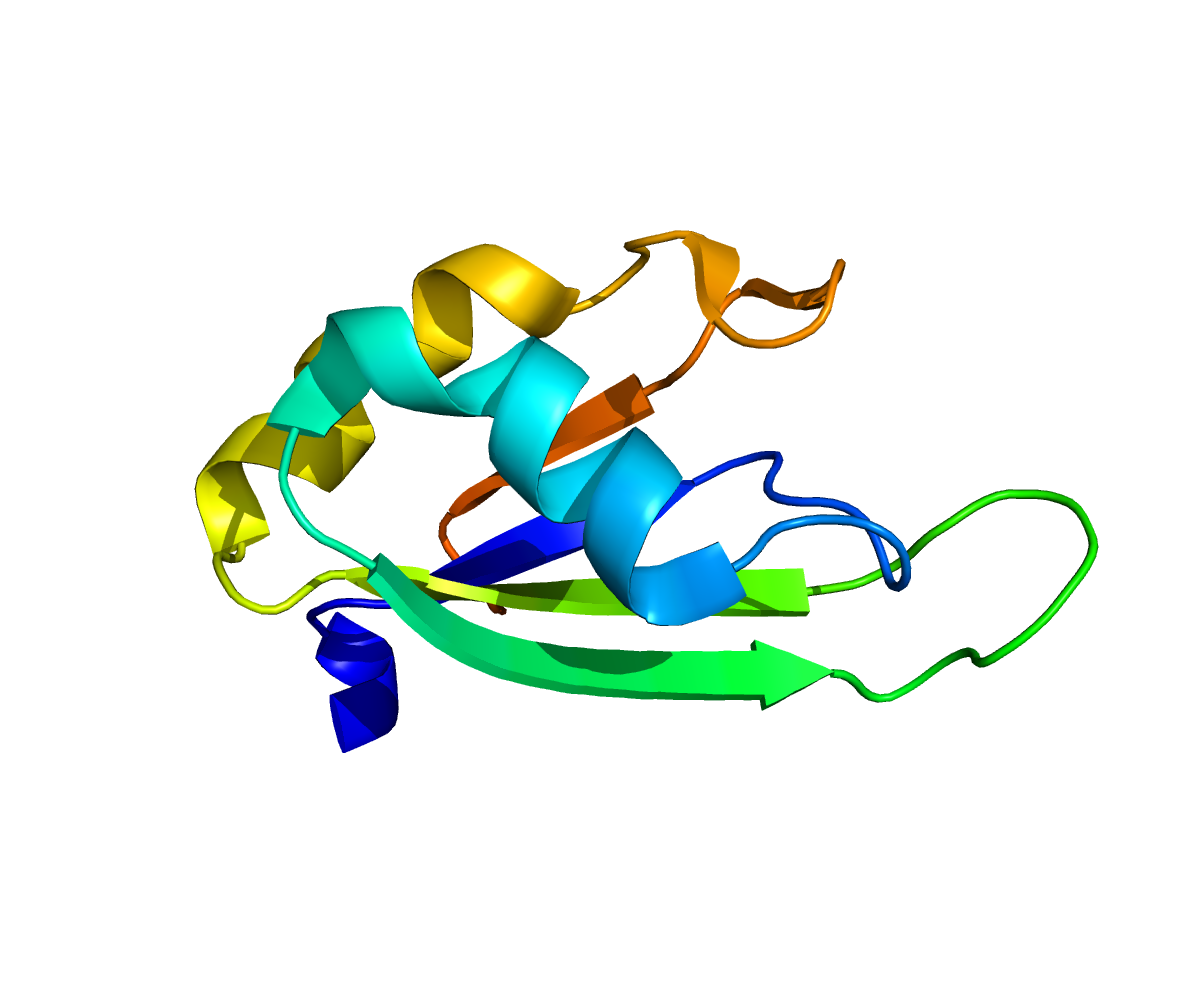
PABN1

The genetics of this type of muscular dystrophy revolve around the PABPN1 gene. This gene suffers mutations that cause the PABPN1 protein to have extra alanine (amino acids), and this manifests itself physically in the symptoms of this MD.

The expansion caused by the mutations on the PABPN1 gene ultimately interrupts the cellular mechanics of poly(A) RNA. In most cases oculopharyngeal muscular dystrophy is inherited via autosomal dominance.

The alleles, which are a variant form of a gene involved in this form of MD are: PABPN1, (GCG)n EXPANSION, (GCG)8-13, PABPN1, (GCG)n EXPANSION, (GCG)7 and PABPN1, GLY12ALA.

== Diagnosis ==
The diagnosis of oculopharyngeal muscular dystrophy can be done via two methods, a muscle biopsy or a blood draw with genetic testing for GCG trinucleotide expansions in the PABPN1 gene. Genetic blood testing is more common. Additionally, a distinction between OPMD and myasthenia gravis or mitochondrial myopathy must be made, in regards to the differential diagnosis of this condition.

== Treatment ==
Currently, no cure or specific treatment exists to eliminate the symptoms or stop the disease progression. A consistent diet planned with the help of a dietitian along with exercises taught by a speech therapist can assist with mild symptoms of dysphagia. Surgical intervention can also help temporarily manage symptoms related to ptosis and dysphagia. Cutting one of the throat muscles internally, an operation called cricopharyngeal myotomy, can be one way to ease symptoms in more severe cases. However, for most people, the benefits from such treatments are only temporary. There is currently no treatment available to address the proximal limb weakness. Many of those affected with proximal limb weakness will eventually require assistive devices such as canes, braces, or a wheelchair. As with all surgical procedures, they come with many risk factors. As the dysphagia becomes more severe, patients become malnourished, lose significant weight, become dehydrated and have repeated incidents of aspiration pneumonia. These last two are often the cause of death.

== Epidemiology ==
The disease is found across 5 continents (30 countries) and is frequently seen in French Canadians, with a prevalence 1:1000. OPMD affects males and females equally, and affected individuals have been found in Europe (France), Jewish Bukharan, and Spanish Americans.

== See also ==
- Muscular dystrophy
- PABPN1
