= Lectionary 14 =

Lectionary ℓ 14
- New Testament manuscript
- Text: Evangelistarion
- Date: 16th-century
- Script: Greek
- Now at: Bibliothèque nationale de France
- Size: 27.2 cm by 19.1 cm

Lectionary 14 is designated by siglum ℓ 14 (in the Gregory-Aland numbering). It is a Greek manuscript of the New Testament, on paper leaves. Palaeographically it has been assigned to the 16th century.

== Description ==
The codex contains lessons from the Gospels of John and Matthew and a Lukan lectionary (Evangelistarium). It is written in Greek minuscule letters, on 348 paper leaves (27.2 cm by 19.1 cm), 2 columns per page, and 22 lines per page.

Currently the codex is located in the Bibliothèque nationale de France (Gr. 315) in Paris.

The manuscript is sporadically cited in the critical editions of the Greek New Testament (UBS3).

It was added to the list of the New Testament manuscripts by Wettstein. It was examined by Scholz, and Paulin Martin. C. R. Gregory saw it in 1885.

== See also ==
- List of New Testament lectionaries
- Biblical manuscript
- Textual criticism

== Bibliography ==
- Gregory, Caspar René (1900). Textkritik des Neuen Testaments. Vol. 1. Leipzig: J.C. Hinrichs. p. 388.
