= CIR1 =

Protein-coding gene in humans

CIRSR

Identifiers
- Aliases: CIRSR, CIR, corepressor interacting with RBPJ, 1, corepressor interacting with RBPJ, CIR1, CIR1
- External IDs: OMIM: 605228; MGI: 1914185; HomoloGene: 3589; GeneCards: CIRSR; OMA:CIRSR - orthologs

Gene location (Human)
Chr.	Chromosome 2 (human)
Band	2q31.1	Start	174,348,022 bp
Band	2q31.1	End	174,395,712 bp

Gene location (Mouse)
Chr.	Chromosome 2 (mouse)
Band	2|2 C3	Start	73,113,449 bp
Band	2|2 C3	End	73,143,045 bp
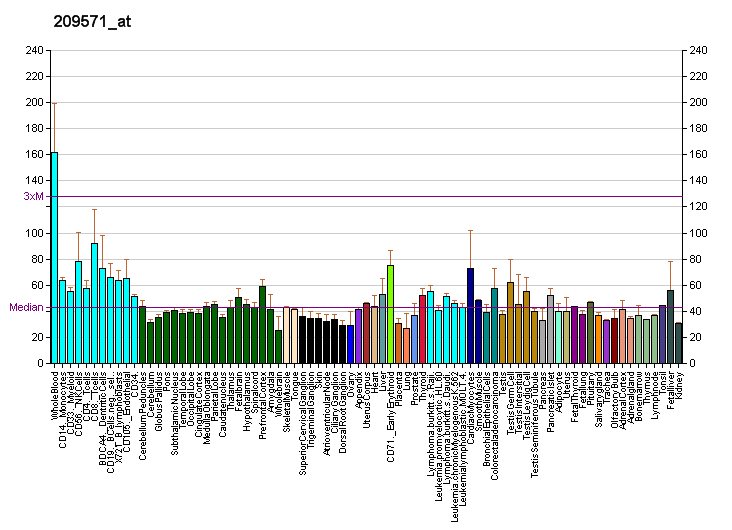
RNA expression pattern
Bgee	Human / Mouse (ortholog); Top expressed in: tendon of biceps brachii; monocyte; Achilles tendon; olfactory zone of nasal mucosa; sural nerve; right uterine tube; right lung; gastric mucosa; skin of leg; blood / Top expressed in: bone marrow; zygote; testicle; secondary oocyte; granulocyte; primary oocyte; genital tubercle; ovary; ganglionic eminence; muscle of thigh; More reference expression data
BioGPS	More reference expression data
Gene ontology
Molecular function	DNA-binding transcription factor activity; transcription factor activity, RNA polymerase II distal enhancer sequence-specific binding; protein binding; transcription corepressor activity; protein kinase binding; protein-containing complex binding
Cellular component	cytoplasm; histone deacetylase complex; cytoskeleton; nucleus; microtubule organizing center; nuclear speck; centrosome; protein-containing complex
Biological process	mRNA processing; negative regulation of transcription, DNA-templated; regulation of transcription, DNA-templated; transcription, DNA-templated; RNA splicing; regulation of transcription by RNA polymerase II
Sources:Amigo / QuickGO
Orthologs
Species	Human	Mouse
Entrez	9541	66935
Ensembl	ENSG00000138433	ENSMUSG00000041777
UniProt	Q86X95	Q9DA19
RefSeq (mRNA)	NM_199075; NM_004882	NM_025854
RefSeq (protein)	NP_004873	NP_080130
Location (UCSC)	Chr 2: 174.35 – 174.4 Mb	Chr 2: 73.11 – 73.14 Mb
PubMed search
- Wikidata
View/Edit Human	View/Edit Mouse

Corepressor of RBPJ and splicing regulator is a protein that in humans is encoded by the CIRSR gene (previously CIR1).

== Interactions ==
CIR (gene) has been shown to interact with SNW1.
