= Y-box-binding protein 2 =

Protein-coding gene in humans

YBX2

Identifiers
- Aliases: YBX2, CONTRIN, CSDA3, DBPC, MSY2, Y-box binding protein 2
- External IDs: OMIM: 611447; MGI: 1096372; GeneCards: YBX2

Gene location (Human)
Chr.	Chromosome 17 (human)
Band	17p13.1	Start	7,288,263 bp
Band	17p13.1	End	7,294,639 bp

Gene location (Mouse)
Chr.	Chromosome 11 (mouse)
Band	11|11 B3	Start	69,935,796 bp
Band	11|11 B3	End	69,941,605 bp
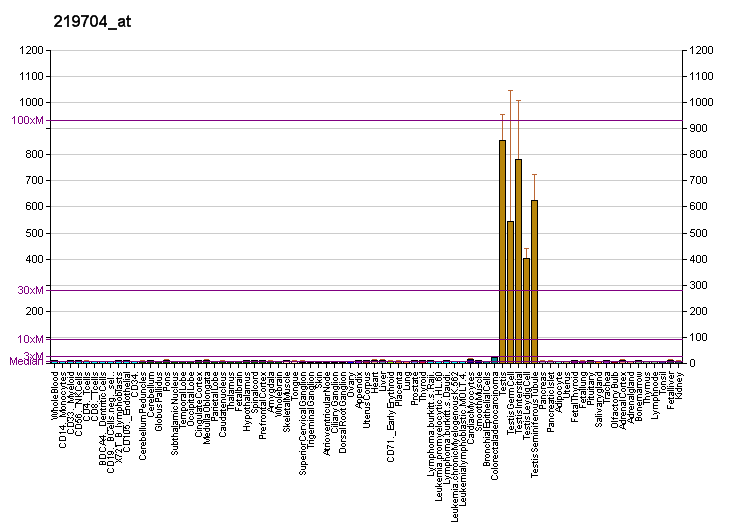
RNA expression pattern
Bgee	Human / Mouse (ortholog); Top expressed in: right testis; left testis; mucosa of transverse colon; duodenum; gonad; medulla oblongata; testicle; rectum; skeletal muscle tissue; muscle of thigh / Top expressed in: seminiferous tubule; spermatid; spermatocyte; zygote; primary oocyte; secondary oocyte; muscle of thigh; neural layer of retina; interventricular septum; genital tubercle; More reference expression data
BioGPS	More reference expression data
Gene ontology
Molecular function	DNA binding; RNA binding; nucleic acid binding; DNA-binding transcription factor activity, RNA polymerase II-specific
Cellular component	cytoplasm; nucleus; fibrillar center
Biological process	regulation of transcription, DNA-templated; translational attenuation; transcription by RNA polymerase II; spermatogenesis; oocyte development; regulation of transcription by RNA polymerase II; positive regulation of cold-induced thermogenesis
Sources:Amigo / QuickGO
Orthologs
Databases	NCBI: entry; OMA: entry
Species	Human	Mouse
Entrez	51087	53422
Ensembl	ENSG00000006047; ENSG00000288504	ENSMUSG00000018554
UniProt	Q9Y2T7	Q9Z2C8
RefSeq (mRNA)	NM_015982	NM_016875; NM_001347634
RefSeq (protein)	NP_057066	n/a
Location (UCSC)	Chr 17: 7.29 – 7.29 Mb	Chr 11: 69.94 – 69.94 Mb
PubMed search
- Wikidata
View/Edit Human	View/Edit Mouse

Y-box-binding protein 2 is a protein that in humans is encoded by the YBX2 gene. The YBX2 protein is a transcription factor that is expressed in sperm and egg cells which binds to both DNA (at promotors) and messenger RNA.

== See also ==
- RNA polymerase II
- Transcription (biology)
- Translation (biology)
