= PABPN1 =

Protein-coding gene in the species Homo sapiens

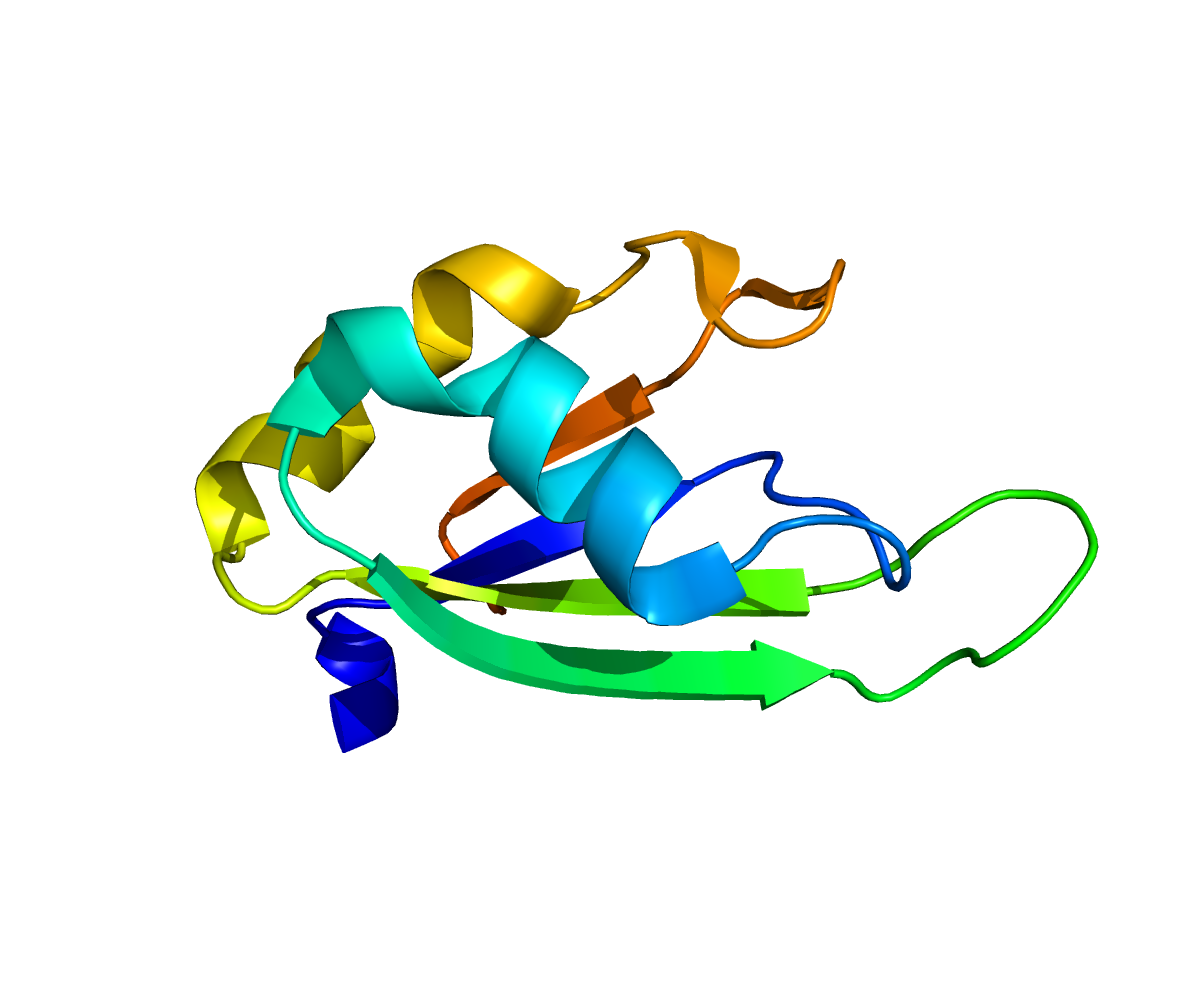

Identifiers
- Aliases: PABPN1, OPMD, PAB2, PABII, PABP-2, PABP2, poly(A) binding protein nuclear 1
- External IDs: OMIM: 602279; MGI: 1859158; GeneCards: PABPN1
Available structures
PDB	Ortholog search: PDBe RCSB
PDB	List of PDB id codes 3B4D, 3B4M, 3UCG

Gene location (Human)
Chr.	Chromosome 14 (human)
Band	14q11.2	Start	23,321,457 bp
Band	14q11.2	End	23,326,163 bp

Gene location (Mouse)
Chr.	Chromosome 14 (mouse)
Band	14 C3|14 27.98 cM	Start	55,129,957 bp
Band	14 C3|14 27.98 cM	End	55,135,626 bp
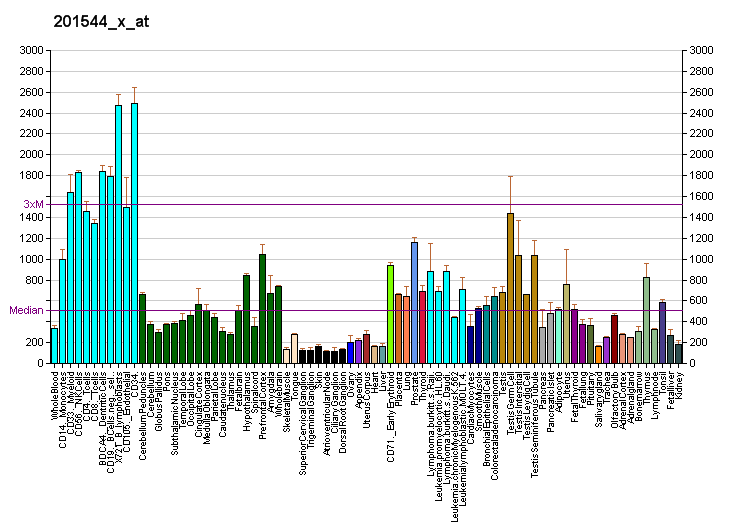

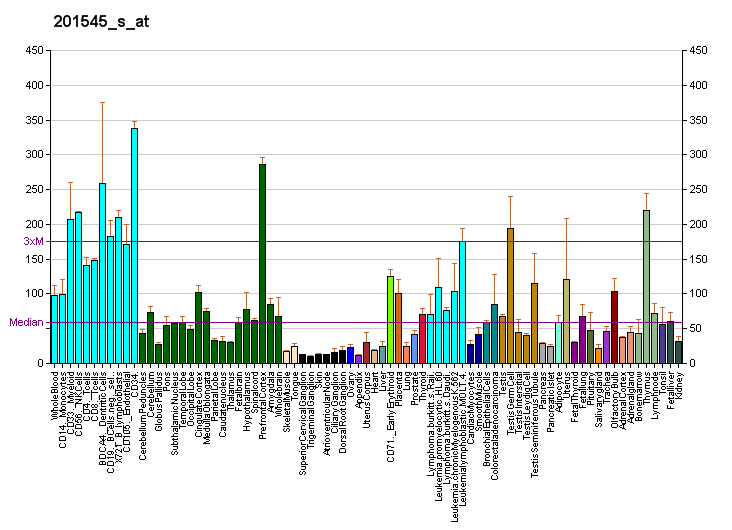
RNA expression pattern
Bgee	Human / Mouse (ortholog); Top expressed in: right testis; left testis; right hemisphere of cerebellum; right uterine tube; anterior pituitary; body of uterus; right lobe of thyroid gland; left lobe of thyroid gland; ganglionic eminence; sural nerve / Top expressed in: neural layer of retina; ventricular zone; tail of embryo; renal corpuscle; superior frontal gyrus; genital tubercle; primary visual cortex; epiblast; lip; dentate gyrus of hippocampal formation granule cell; More reference expression data
BioGPS	More reference expression data
Gene ontology
Molecular function	protein binding; nucleic acid binding; RNA binding; RNA polymerase binding
Cellular component	cytoplasm; nucleoplasm; nuclear inclusion body; nucleus; nuclear speck; ribonucleoprotein complex
Biological process	mRNA splicing, via spliceosome; termination of RNA polymerase II transcription; RNA processing; muscle contraction; mRNA processing; poly(A)+ mRNA export from nucleus; modification by virus of host mRNA processing; mRNA 3'-end processing; MAPK cascade; cellular response to lipopolysaccharide; positive regulation of polynucleotide adenylyltransferase activity
Sources:Amigo / QuickGO
Orthologs
Databases	NCBI: entry; OMA: entry
Species	Human	Mouse
Entrez	8106	54196
Ensembl	ENSG00000100836	ENSMUSG00000022194
UniProt	Q86U42	Q8CCS6
RefSeq (mRNA)	NM_004643; NM_001360551; NM_001360552	NM_019402
RefSeq (protein)	NP_004634; NP_001347480; NP_001347481	NP_062275
Location (UCSC)	Chr 14: 23.32 – 23.33 Mb	Chr 14: 55.13 – 55.14 Mb
PubMed search
- Wikidata
View/Edit Human	View/Edit Mouse

Polyadenylate-binding protein 2 (PABP-2) also known as polyadenylate-binding nuclear protein 1 (PABPN1) is a protein that in humans is encoded by the PABPN1 gene. PABPN1 is a member of a larger family of poly(A)-binding proteins in the human genome.

== Function ==
This gene encodes an abundant nuclear protein that binds with high affinity to nascent poly(A) tails. The protein is required for progressive and efficient polymerization of poly(A) tails on the 3' ends of eukaryotic genes and controls the size of the poly(A) tail to about 250 nt. At steady-state, this protein is localized in the nucleus whereas a different poly(A) binding protein is localized in the cytoplasm. An expansion of the trinucleotide (GCN) repeat from normal 10 to 11–17 at the 5' end of the coding region of this gene leads to autosomal dominant oculopharyngeal muscular dystrophy (OPMD) disease. Multiple splice variants have been described but their full-length nature is not known. One splice variant includes introns 1 and 6 but no protein is formed.

== Interactions ==
PABPN1 has been shown to interact with SNW1.
