= Zinc finger CCCH-type containing 10 =

Protein-coding gene in the species Homo sapiens

ZC3H10

Identifiers
- Aliases: ZC3H10, ZC3HDC10, zinc finger CCCH-type containing 10
- External IDs: MGI: 2143670; GeneCards: ZC3H10

Gene location (Human)
Chr.	Chromosome 12 (human)
Band	12q13.2	Start	56,118,260 bp
Band	12q13.2	End	56,127,514 bp

Gene location (Mouse)
Chr.	Chromosome 10 (mouse)
Band	10|10 D3	Start	128,377,832 bp
Band	10|10 D3	End	128,383,643 bp
RNA expression pattern
Bgee	Human / Mouse (ortholog); Top expressed in: sperm; endothelial cell; tibialis anterior muscle; buccal mucosa cell; mucosa of ileum; gonad; testicle; deltoid muscle; nipple; stromal cell of endometrium / Top expressed in: otic vesicle; saccule; external carotid artery; spermatid; internal carotid artery; otic placode; granulocyte; spermatocyte; seminiferous tubule; islet of Langerhans; More reference expression data
BioGPS	n/a
Gene ontology
Molecular function	metal ion binding; protein binding; miRNA binding; RNA binding
Cellular component	nucleus; nucleoplasm; cytoplasm
Biological process	posttranscriptional regulation of gene expression; negative regulation of production of miRNAs involved in gene silencing by miRNA; regulation of alternative mRNA splicing, via spliceosome
Sources:Amigo / QuickGO
Orthologs
Databases	NCBI: entry; OMA: entry
Species	Human	Mouse
Entrez	84872	103284
Ensembl	ENSG00000135482	ENSMUSG00000039810
UniProt	Q96K80	Q8R205
RefSeq (mRNA)	NM_032786; NM_001303124; NM_001303125	NM_134003
RefSeq (protein)	NP_001290053; NP_001290054; NP_116175	NP_598764
Location (UCSC)	Chr 12: 56.12 – 56.13 Mb	Chr 10: 128.38 – 128.38 Mb
PubMed search
- Wikidata
View/Edit Human	View/Edit Mouse

Zinc finger CCCH-type containing 10 is a protein that in humans is encoded by the ZC3H10 gene.
