= 60S ribosomal protein L14 =

Protein found in humans

RPL14

Identifiers
- Aliases: RPL14, CAG-ISL-7, CTG-B33, L14, RL14, hRL14, ribosomal protein L14
- External IDs: OMIM: 617414; MGI: 1914365; GeneCards: RPL14
Available structures
PDB	Ortholog search: PDBe RCSB
PDB	List of PDB id codes 5AJ0, 4UG0, 4V6X

Gene location (Human)
Chr.	Chromosome 3 (human)
Band	3p22.1	Start	40,457,292 bp
Band	3p22.1	End	40,468,587 bp

Gene location (Mouse)
Chr.	Chromosome 9 (mouse)
Band	9|9 F4	Start	120,400,510 bp
Band	9|9 F4	End	120,403,720 bp
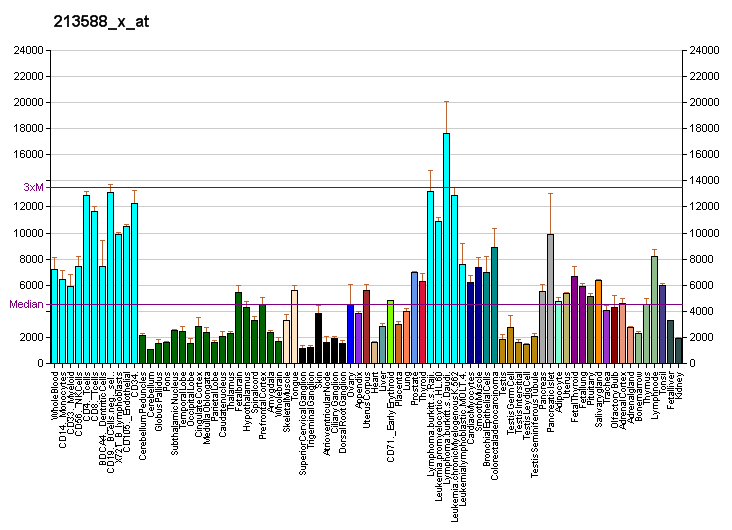
RNA expression pattern
Bgee	Human / Mouse (ortholog); Top expressed in: left ovary; body of pancreas; right ovary; ganglionic eminence; skin of abdomen; canal of the cervix; gastric mucosa; body of uterus; muscle layer of sigmoid colon; skin of leg / Top expressed in: blastocyst; morula; embryo; embryo; ventricular zone; lip; yolk sac; dentate gyrus of hippocampal formation granule cell; superior frontal gyrus; muscle of thigh; More reference expression data
BioGPS	More reference expression data
Gene ontology
Molecular function	protein binding; cadherin binding; RNA binding; structural constituent of ribosome
Cellular component	cytosol; ribosome; membrane; intracellular anatomical structure; cytosolic large ribosomal subunit; extracellular exosome; postsynaptic density
Biological process	viral transcription; SRP-dependent cotranslational protein targeting to membrane; ribosomal large subunit biogenesis; translational initiation; nuclear-transcribed mRNA catabolic process, nonsense-mediated decay; rRNA processing; protein biosynthesis
Sources:Amigo / QuickGO
Orthologs
Databases	NCBI: entry; OMA: entry
Species	Human	Mouse
Entrez	9045	67115
Ensembl	ENSG00000188846	ENSMUSG00000025794
UniProt	P50914	Q9CR57
RefSeq (mRNA)	NM_003973; NM_001034996	NM_025974
RefSeq (protein)	NP_001030168; NP_003964	NP_080250
Location (UCSC)	Chr 3: 40.46 – 40.47 Mb	Chr 9: 120.4 – 120.4 Mb
PubMed search
- Wikidata
View/Edit Human	View/Edit Mouse

60S ribosomal protein L14 is a protein that in humans is encoded by the RPL14 gene.

== Function ==
Ribosomes, the organelles that catalyze protein synthesis, consist of a small 40S subunit and a large 60S subunit. Together these subunits are composed of 4 RNA species and approximately 80 structurally distinct proteins. This gene encodes a ribosomal protein that is a component of the 60S subunit. The protein belongs to the L14E family of ribosomal proteins. It contains a basic region-leucine zipper (bZIP)-like domain. The protein is located in the cytoplasm. This gene contains a trinucleotide (GCT) repeat tract whose length is highly polymorphic; these triplet repeats result in a stretch of alanine residues in the encoded protein. Transcript variants utilizing alternative polyA signals and alternative 5'-terminal exons exist but all encode the same protein. As is typical for genes encoding ribosomal proteins, there are multiple processed pseudogenes of this gene dispersed through the genome.

== Interactions ==
RPL14 has been shown to interact with PHLDA1.
