= RREB1 =

Protein-coding gene in the species Homo sapiens

Identifiers
- Aliases: RREB1, FINB, HNT, LZ321, RREB-1, Zep-1, ras responsive element binding protein 1
- External IDs: OMIM: 602209; MGI: 2443664; GeneCards: RREB1

Gene location (Human)
| Chr. | Chromosome 6 (human) |
| Band | 6p24.3 | Start | 7,107,597 bp |
| Band | 6p24.3 | End | 7,251,980 bp |

Gene location (Mouse)
| Chr. | Chromosome 13 (mouse) |
| Band | 13|13 A3.3 | Start | 37,962,376 bp |
| Band | 13|13 A3.3 | End | 38,135,981 bp |
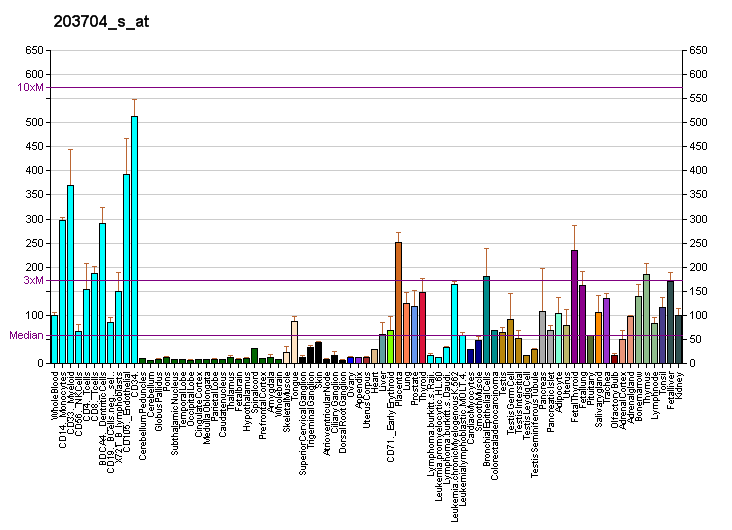

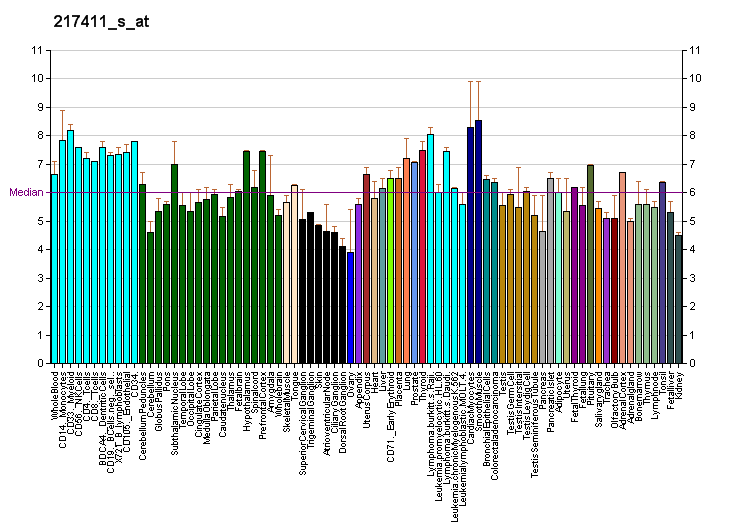

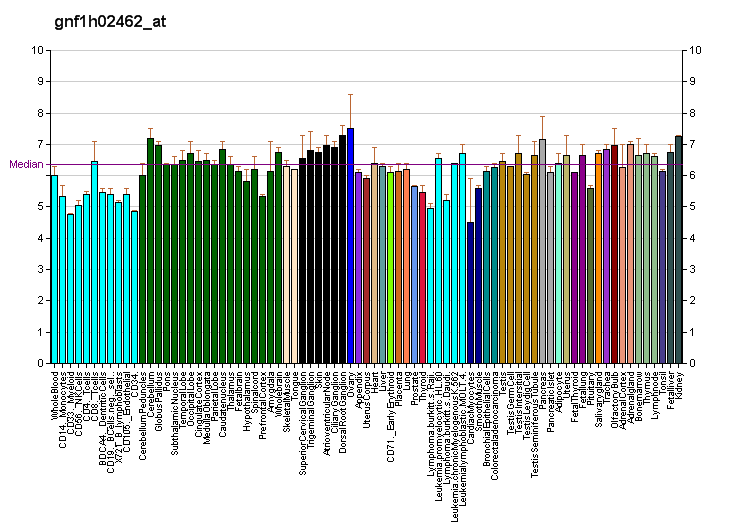
RNA expression pattern
| Bgee | Human / Mouse (ortholog); Top expressed in: buccal mucosa cell; epithelium of nasopharynx; oral cavity; skin of thigh; sural nerve; mucosa of pharynx; parotid gland; skin of hip; epithelium of esophagus; mucosa of sigmoid colon / Top expressed in: left lung lobe; substantia nigra; pineal gland; ciliary body; lacrimal gland; Paneth cell; migratory enteric neural crest cell; conjunctival fornix; anterior amygdaloid area; olfactory tubercle; More reference expression data |
| BioGPS | More reference expression data |
Gene ontology
| Molecular function | DNA binding; metal ion binding; nucleic acid binding; RNA polymerase II core promoter sequence-specific DNA binding; RNA polymerase II transcription regulatory region sequence-specific DNA binding; DNA-binding transcription activator activity, RNA polymerase II-specific; DNA-binding transcription factor activity; RNA polymerase II cis-regulatory region sequence-specific DNA binding; DNA-binding transcription factor activity, RNA polymerase II-specific |
| Cellular component | nuclear body; extracellular exosome; fibrillar center; nucleus; cytoplasm; nuclear speck |
| Biological process | positive regulation of mammary gland epithelial cell proliferation; positive regulation of lamellipodium morphogenesis; regulation of transcription, DNA-templated; positive regulation of epithelial cell migration; transcription by RNA polymerase II; transcription, DNA-templated; multicellular organism development; positive regulation of transcription, DNA-templated; positive regulation of substrate adhesion-dependent cell spreading; Ras protein signal transduction; negative regulation of transcription, DNA-templated; positive regulation of wound healing, spreading of epidermal cells; negative regulation of transcription by RNA polymerase II; positive regulation of transcription by RNA polymerase II |
Sources:Amigo / QuickGO
Orthologs
| Databases | NCBI: entry; OMA: entry |
| Species | Human | Mouse |
| Entrez | 6239 | 68750 |
| Ensembl | ENSG00000124782 | ENSMUSG00000039087 |
| UniProt | Q92766 | Q3UH06 |
| RefSeq (mRNA) | NM_001003698; NM_001003699; NM_001003700; NM_001168344; NM_002955 | NM_001013392; NM_001039188; NM_001177868; NM_001177869; NM_026830 |
| RefSeq (protein) | NP_001003698; NP_001003699; NP_001003700; NP_001161816; NP_001003698.1 NP_001161816.1 | NP_001034277; NP_001171339; NP_001171340; NP_081106; NP_001391686 NP_001391687; NP_001391688; NP_001391689 |
| Location (UCSC) | Chr 6: 7.11 – 7.25 Mb | Chr 13: 37.96 – 38.14 Mb |
| PubMed search |
- Wikidata
| View/Edit Human | View/Edit Mouse |

Ras-responsive element-binding protein 1 is a protein that in humans is encoded by the RREB1 gene.

== Clinical significance ==
Mutations in RREB1 are associated to type 2 diabetes associated end-stage kidney disease.
