= C1 =

C1, C01, C.I or C-1 may refer to:

== Arts and media ==
- C1, a note-octave in music
- C1 Television, a Mongolian television channel
- Cinema One, Philippine pay TV channel
- Schecter C-1 Hellraiser FR, a guitar model
- A Yamaha grand piano model
- "C1", a slang expression in the video game Counter-Strike, used to express agreement

== Biology and medicine ==
=== Anatomy ===
- Cervical vertebra 1, the first cervical vertebrae of the vertebral column
- Cervical spinal nerve 1, a spinal nerve of the cervical segment

=== Biochemistry ===
- C1 complex, the first component of the classical complement pathway
- C1 domain, an important secondary messenger protein domain
- C1-inhibitor, a human serine protease inhibitor
- C1 regulatory sequence for the insulin gene
- Apolipoprotein C1, a human lipoprotein
- Chlorophyll c1, a form of chlorophyll
- Cytochrome C1, a precursor protein to Cytochrome C
- Proanthocyanidin C1, a type of polyphenolic compound
- Prostaglandin C1, a form of prostaglandins

=== Other uses in biology and medicine ===
- C1 and P1 (neuroscience), a component of the visual evoked potential
- ATC code C01, a subgroup of the Anatomical Therapeutic Chemical Classification System
- "malignant neoplasm of base of tongue", a form of oral cancer (ICD-10 code "C01")
- A microfluidic single-cell analysis system sold by Fluidigm, short name C1

== Chemistry ==
- C1 Chemistry, study of methane, methanol, carbon monoxide, carbon dioxide

== Computing ==
=== Hardware ===
- C-One, a single-board microcomputer
- C1 Famicom TV, a family of Famicom television-set hybrids manufactured by Sharp Corporation in 1983
- ATI C1, codename of the Xbox 360 GPU Xenos
- Apple C1, a cellular modem chip
- A type of error on a compact disc (CD); see Compact disc § Integrity
- LG C1, a television set released in 2021

=== Other uses in computing ===
- C0 and C1 control codes defined in ISO 6429
- C1 (protocol), a 1984 protocol for file transfer, also known as "Punter"
- TCSEC C1 security class
- A CPU power state in the Advanced Configuration and Power Interface

== Mathematics ==
- $C^1$, the set of all continuously differentiable functions
- C1 field, a quasi-algebraically closed field
- C1, the first of four pure modules taken in the Advanced Level (UK) Maths syllabus

== Transportation ==
=== Air ===
- C-1 Trader, a cargo-version of the S-2 Tracker anti-submarine warfare aircraft of the US Navy
- AEG C.I, a German World War I reconnaissance aircraft
- AGO C.I, a 1915 German reconnaissance biplane
- Albatros C.I, a 1915 German two-seat general-purpose biplane
- Aviatik C.I, a 1915 German observation plane
- Cierva C.1, a 1920 Spanish experimental autogyro
- DFW C.I, a WWI German reconnaissance aircraft
- Douglas C-1, a cargo/transport airplane produced by Douglas Aircraft for the U.S. Army Air Service starting in 1925
- Fokker C.I, a 1918 German reconnaissance biplane
- Friedrichshafen C.I, a 1914 German single-engined amphibious reconnaissance biplane
- Hansa-Brandenburg C.I, a 1916 German 2-seater armed single-engine reconnaissance biplane
- Kawasaki C-1, an indigenous transport aircraft of the Japanese Air Self-Defense Forces
- Loring C-1, an interwar period Spanish fighter prototype
- Otto C.I, a 1915 German reconnaissance biplane
- Rumpler C.I, a 1915 German two-seater single-engine reconnaissance biplane
- Southern Cross Airport (New Jersey) (FAA LID: C01)

=== Land ===
==== Routes ====
- Circumferential Road 1 or C-1, an arterial road of Manila, Philippines
- London Buses route C1
- Route C1 (Shuto Expressway), the Inner Loop of Tokyo's Shuto Expressway system
- Claro M. Recto Avenue, a road in Metro Manila, Philippines
- Massachusetts State Route C1
- Câble 1, a cable car route in Grand Paris, France

==== Land vehicles ====
- BMW C1, a cabin scooter
- Chevrolet Corvette C1, first generation sold from 1953 to 1962, denoted a solid-axle rear-end
- Citroën C1, a small car
- Ford C1 platform, the Ford Motor Company's global compact car automobile platform
- Leapmotor C01, a battery electric executive sedan
- Lit C-1, a prototype cabin motorcycle
- Nimrod NRA/C1, a 1981 test design racing car
- Sauber C1, a Sauber sport car

==== Other uses in land transport ====
- C1, the number plate of the Prime Minister of Australia's official VIP transportation
- A type of heavy goods vehicle licence
- A one-way traffic sign in the Vienna Convention on Road Signs and Signals

=== Rail ===
- C1-class Melbourne tram
- Bavarian C I, an 1847 German steam locomotives class
- Ceylon Government Railway C1, a steam locomotive class
- GNR Class C1 (small boiler), a British 4-4-2 steam locomotive class (classified C2 during LNER ownership)
- GNR Class C1 (large boiler), a British 4-4-2 steam locomotive class
- LB&SCR C1 class, an 1882 British freight steam locomotive
- Long Island Rail Road C1, a bilevel railcar built by Tokyu Car Corporation
- NER Class C1, a British 0-6-0 steam locomotive class
- PRR C1, an American PRR steam locomotive
- Finnish Steam Locomotive Class C1

=== Sea ===
- C-1, later renamed Isaac Peral (C-1), a Spanish Navy submarine
- HMS C1, a C-class submarine of the Royal Navy
- USS C-1 (SS-9), a C-class submarine of the US Navy
- USS Newark (C-1), a protected cruiser of the US Navy
- Type C1 ship, a small cargo vessel built by the US in large numbers before and during World War II

=== Space ===
- Cluster 1, also known as Rumba, an ESA satellite

== Sports ==
- C1, a solo canoe discipline including sprint canoe and canoe slalom
- C1 (classification), a para-cycling classification
- Class One offshore powerboat racing, abbreviated "C1"
- 'C1', the top category in Group C sportscar racing, used between 1985 and 1990
- C1, the UEFA Champions League (formerly known as the European Cup) in football
  - Serie C1, the third highest football league in Italy until 2008

== Other uses ==
- C1, an international standard paper size defined in ISO 216 (648×917 mm)
- Bills C-1 and S-1, a pro forma bill normally introduced at the start of a parliamentary session in the Canadian House of Commons
- C1, also known as Vlakplaas, a unit of the South African Police responsible for assassinating opponents of Apartheid during the 1980s
- C1, a level in the Common European Framework of Reference for Languages
- C1, the use class for hotels, in town and country planning in the United Kingdom
- C1, a NRS social grade in the UK for the lower middle class
- A 2001 1.3 megapixels Olympus digital camera model
- A class of FM radio broadcasting in North America
- C1 pylon, a type of high voltage pylon
- Caldwell 1 (NGC 188), an open cluster in Cepheus
- C-1 visa, a type of visa for individuals transiting through the US
- C1 Espresso, café in Christchurch, New Zealand
- Capital One, an American banking company
- Alpha Centauri Ab, formerly called Candidate 1

== See also ==
- CL (disambiguation)
- CI (disambiguation)
- 1C (disambiguation)
