= CLCL =

CLCL may refer to:

- Canada Lands Company
- Central Lancashire Cricket League
- CLCL, an assembly language code for the IBM System/370
- CLCL, a clipboard history manager for Windows

== See also ==
- CL (disambiguation)
- CL2 (disambiguation)
