= Southern Cross Airport =

Southern Cross Airport refers to:

- Southern Cross Airport (New Jersey)
- Southern Cross Airport (Western Australia)
