= CL-52 =

CL-52 or variation, may refer to:

- Canadair CL-52 Stratojet, RCAF jet bomber from the 1950s
- Chlorine 52 (Cl-52; ^{52}Cl), an isotope of chlorine
- CL52, a type of vacuum tube; see List of vacuum tubes
- USS Juneau (CL-52), WWII USN Atlanta-class light cruiser, whose sinking killed the five Sullivan brothers

== See also ==
- CL (disambiguation)
