= 1C =

1C or 1c may also refer to:

- 1C Company, Russian software company
- 1 Cup (unit)
- California Proposition 1C (2009), a defeated California ballot proposition
- Cent (currency)
  - 1 cent euro coins
  - Penny (United States coin)
  - Penny (Irish decimal coin)
- expression of genome size
- First Cambridge Catalogue of Radio Sources
- measure of charge rate for an electric battery
- National Highway 1C, an Indian highway

== See also ==
- C1 (disambiguation)
