= California Proposition 58 =

California Proposition 58 may refer to:

- California Proposition 58 (2004)
- California Proposition 58 (2016)
