= Cizhou =

Cizhou may refer to:

== Modern locations ==
- Cizhou, Hebei (磁州), a town in Ci County, Hebei, China, named after the historical prefecture

== Historical locations ==
- Cizhou (in modern Hebei) (磁州), a prefecture between the 6th and 20th centuries in modern Hebei, China
- Cizhou (in modern Shanxi) (慈州), a prefecture between the 7th and 12th centuries in modern Shanxi, China
- Cizhou (in modern Inner Mongolia) (慈州), a prefecture between the 10th and 11th centuries in modern Inner Mongolia, China

== See also ==
- Ci (disambiguation)
