= PGA1 =

PGA1 may refer to:

- Micro-PGA1, the predecessor of the Intel's Micro-PGA2 pin grid array package for their Pentium III
- Prostaglandin A1, a form of prostaglandin
