= 2009 California Proposition 1C =

Defeated referendum on the State Lottery

Proposition 1C was a defeated California ballot proposition that appeared on the May 19, 2009 special election ballot. The measure was a legislatively referred constitutional amendment that would have made significant changes to the operation of the State Lottery.

== Background ==
In February 2009, the State Legislature narrowly passed the 2008–2009 state budget during a special session, months after it was due. As part of the plan to lower the state's annual deficits, the State Legislature ordered a special election with various budget reform ballot propositions, among them Proposition 1C.

The proposition was part of Assembly Bill 12 (Third Extraordinary Session), which was authored by Assemblywoman Noreen Evans, a Democrat from Santa Rosa. The bill passed in the State Assembly by a vote of 70 to 8 and in the State Senate by a vote of 30 to 8.

== Proposal ==
Proposition 1C would have authorized borrowing against future State Lottery proceeds as a way to avoid statewide spending cuts. The 2009–2010 budget plan included $5 billion from this source, and the measure would also have authorized similar borrowing in future years. It did not include a cap on the amount of future lottery revenue that could be pledged to pay for current spending. Essentially, the measure would have allowed a form of deficit spending that would not be subject to the balanced budget provisions adopted by a vote of the people in Proposition 58.

The proposal would have also repealed the requirement that State Lottery revenue be used only for education. Instead, the State Legislature could have appropriated State Lottery revenue for any purpose. However, the measure would have required the State Legislature to appropriate general fund revenues to education in an amount equivalent to the State Lottery revenues that went to schools in 2008–2009 fiscal year, adjusted for inflation and changes in student counts.

It would have also revised State Lottery management details, including repealing a competitive bidding requirement for certain State Lottery operations, and lowering the cap on the amount of State Lottery revenue that can be used for administration purposes from 16% to 13% (which was the amount used for administration at the time).

== Results ==
Electoral results by county

Proposition 1C
Choice	Votes	%
For	1,708,800	35.65
Against	3,085,138	64.35
Total	4,793,938	100.00
Valid votes	4,793,938	98.40
Invalid/blank votes	78,007	1.60
Total votes	4,871,945	100.00
Registered voters/turnout	17,153,012	28.40
