= CI =

CI or Ci may refer to:

== Business terminology ==
- Commercial invoice
- Competitive intelligence
- Confidential information
- Continual improvement
- Corporate identity
- Customer intelligence, a discipline in marketing

== Businesses and organisations ==
=== Academia and education ===
- California State University, Channel Islands
- Channel Islands High School
- Collegium Invisibile
- Confucius Institute

=== Religion ===
- Josephites of Belgium, a Catholic congregation
- Christian Identity
- Christian Institute, a British charity which promotes Christian values

=== Other businesses and organizations ===
- CI Financial, Canadian investment management company
- Charity Intelligence Canada
- China Airlines (IATA code)
- Cigna health services (NYSE symbol)
- Consumers International
- Cycling Ireland
- CI Records, a music record label
- Cambria and Indiana Railroad
- CANZUK International, organisation which promotes cooperation between Canada, Australia, New Zealand and the UK
- Conservation International, an international environmental non-governmental organization
- Communications International, a former global union federation
- Communist International
- Children International, a non-profit child sponsorship organization
- Cryonics Institute, American nonprofit foundation

== Law and military ==
- Counterintelligence
- Confidential informant
- Compliance Inspection, a US Air Force inspection
- Chief inspector, a police rank
- Circle inspector, a junior police rank
- Certificate of identity
- Civilian Internee, a special status of a prisoner during wartime
- Civilian Instructor, an adult volunteer in the British Air Training Corps and Canada Air Cadets

== Places ==
- Ci County, in Hebei, China
- Cayman Islands
- Chile (FIPS country code, obsolete NATO country code)
- Coney Island
- Cocos (Keeling) Islands, an external territory of Australia
- Cook Islands, an island-country in the South Pacific Ocean
- Côte d'Ivoire (ISO country code)
- Channel Islands
- Channel Islands of California
- Carbonia-Iglesias, a province in southern Italy
- Central India, region of India, abbreviated CI
  - Central India Circuit or C. I. Circuit, a Hindi film distribution circuit comprising parts of Madhya Pradesh (Indian state within central India)
- Central Islip, New York, a hamlet on Long Island, New York in the US

== Science, technology and mathematics ==
=== Biology and medicine ===
- cI protein, a repressor protein of Enterobacteria phage λ
- Cytoplasmic incompatibility, a reproductive system
- Cardiac index
- Ci protein, Cubitus interruptus -protein
- Coital incontinence
- Convergence insufficiency
- Corpulence index
- Cumulative incidence, used as a measure of disease frequency in epidemiology
- Cochlear implant
- Chemical injury syndrome, an increased sensitivity to common chemicals also called multiple chemical sensitivity
- Chronic illness, a condition that is long-lasting or recurrent
- Contraindication

=== Computing ===
- .ci, the Internet country code top-level domain (ccTLD) for Côte d'Ivoire
- Common Interface, for a Conditional Access Module
  - CI+, Common Interface Plus
- Computational intelligence
- Configuration item, the fundamental structural unit of a configuration management system
- Core Image, non-destructive image processing technology
- Continuous integration, a software-engineering practice of merging developer code into a main code base frequently
- CodeIgniter, a PHP framework

=== Earth science ===
- Cirrus cloud
- Convective instability

=== Mathematics ===
- Conditional independence, a type of relation of random variables in probability theory
- Confidence interval, an interval estimate of a population parameter used in statistics
- 101 (number) (in Roman numerals)
- Compound interest
- Cosine integral (standard mathematical symbols "Ci" and "ci")

=== Physics ===
- Conical intersection, the location of a discrete degeneracy between two electronic states
- Curie (unit) (Symbol: Ci), a measurement of radioactivity named after Marie Curie
- Copenhagen interpretation, an interpretation of quantum mechanics
- Cubic inch, a unit of volume

=== Other uses in science and technology ===
- CI group, a type of carbonaceous chondrite meteorite
- Carrier interferometry, a radio and optical communication coding technology
- Chemical ionization, a technique used in mass spectrometry
- Configuration interaction, a post-Hartree–Fock method used in computational chemistry
- Contextual inquiry, a user-centered design research method
- Collective intelligence, a subfield of sociology
- Colour Index International, a reference database of CI numbers for dyes and pigments
- Bavarian C I, a steam locomotive with the Royal Bavarian State Railways
- Compression ignition engine, another name for a diesel engine
- Cost Index (CI), the ratio of time cost to fuel cost, used to calculate the cruising speed of an airliner

== Television ==
- Canadian Idol, a Canadian television series
- Law & Order: Criminal Intent, an American television series
- Crime & Investigation Network
  - Crime & Investigation Network (Australia), Australian cable and satellite network focusing on Crime
  - Crime & Investigation Network (Europe), a pan-European television channel
  - Crime & Investigation Network (South East Asia)

== Other uses ==
- Ci (poetry), a form of Chinese lyric poetry
- Qi, a central concept in several eastern philosophies
- Categorical imperative, in philosophy
- Colour Index International, a reference database
- Comprehensible input
- Contact improvisation, a dance technique
- CI, postnominal for Companion of the Order of the Crown of India
- Ci, a form of the surname Qi, of the Tungusic peoples

== See also ==
- C1 (disambiguation)
- CL (disambiguation)
