= Ford C170 platform =

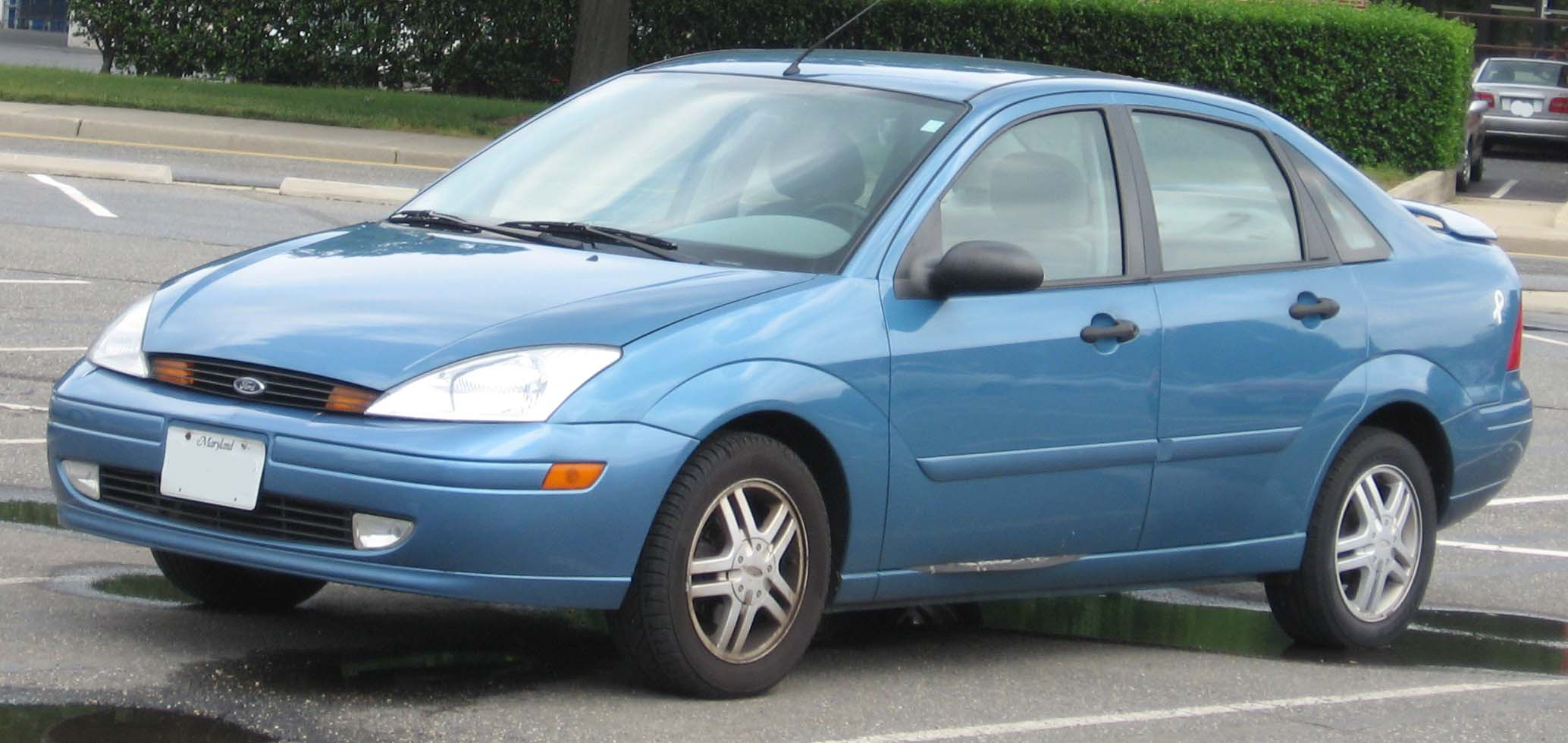

Overview
- Manufacturer: Ford Motor Company
- Production: 1998–2013

Body and chassis
- Class: Compact (C) platform

Chronology
- Predecessor: Ford CT120 platform (Mazda BG platform, in N. America); Ford CE14 platform (in Europe, Latin America, South Africa)
- Successor: Ford C1 platform

The Ford C170 Platform is Ford's compact car automobile platform introduced in 1998, and used by the international Ford Focus through its first generation. It was succeeded by the Ford C1 platform in 2004, except in North America, where it continued in use for the North American Ford Focus until 2011, and the Ford Transit Connect until 2013.
