= Compliance Inspection =

United States Air Force inspection

Unit Compliance Inspection (UCI) is a United States Air Force inspection conducted to assess areas mandated by law, as well as mission areas identified by senior Air Force and Major Command (MAJCOM) leadership as critical or important to the health and performance of a unit. Failure to comply with established directives in these areas could result in significant legal liabilities, penalties, or significant mission impact. During CIs, MAJCOM inspectors general evaluate each common core compliance area (CCCA), which is driven by law, executive order, or applicable directive. Examples of Air Force-level CCCAs based on law are intelligence oversight, transition assistance programs, voting assistance programs, sexual harassment education and prevention, and homosexual conduct policy.

Inspectors grade each individual unit and parent wing on a three-tier scale: Compliant, Compliant with Comment, and Non-Compliant

This article contains material from United States Air Force Pamphlet (AFPAM) 36-2241 which, as a US government publication, is in the public domain.

CAP Wing Compliance Inspection (CI) is a joint Civil Air Patrol-United States Air Force (CAP-USAF) inspection conducted every 48 months to evaluate organizational readiness, efficiency and effectiveness as well as mission areas identified by Civil Air Patrol National Headquarters and U.S. Air Force leadership as critical or important to the performance of a Wing at the state organizational level. Failure to comply with established CAP regulations, rules and policies in these areas could result in major legal liabilities, penalties, and/or significant mission impact. During CIs, CAP and CAP-USAF inspectors general evaluate several organizational CAP Air Staff constituents including: A1 (Manpower & Personnel), A2 (Special Missions), A3 (Operations), A4 (Logistics), A5 (Plans & Programs), A6 (Communications), A7 (Missions - Aerospace Education, Cadet Programs, Professional Development) and A8 (Programs, Financial Management).

Identified strengths are rated as Benchmark or Commendable while identified weaknesses are rated as an Area of Concern (minor deficiency) or Finding (major deficiency). IGs grade each individual Air Staff section (e.g. A1 thru A8) as well as the Wing overall on a four-tier scale: Highly Successful, Successful, Marginally Successful and Unsatisfactory.

This article contains material from CAP Wing Compliance Inspection Guide which is in the public domain.
