= CL2 =

CL2 may refer to:

- Chlorine gas, Cl_{2}
- the Clausen function of order 2, Cl_{2}
- the Clifford algebra on $\mathbb C^2$, $\operatorname{Cl}_2(\mathbb C)$
- CAS latency 2, a rating of computer memory
- Google Calendar, a time-management web application (from a URL fragment used in early versions)
- Only Built 4 Cuban Linx II, a musical album by American hip-hop artist Raekwon
- Class 2 rated cables, in the National Electrical Code
- LPHN2, a human gene that encodes the Latrophilin-2 protein
