= Ford Global C-car Platform =

Volvo P1/Mazda BK/Ford C1 platform
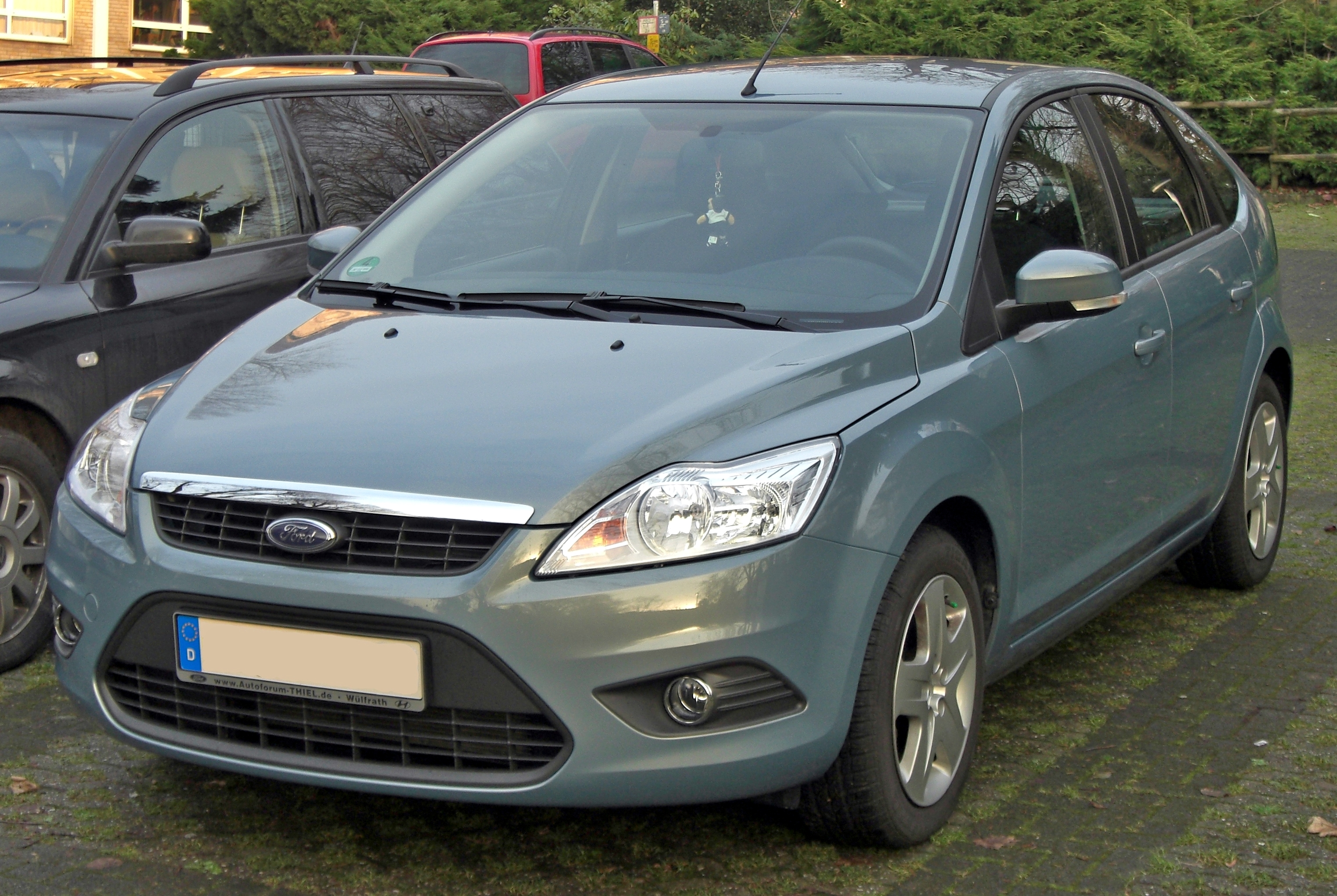

Overview
- Manufacturer: Ford Motor Company; Volvo Cars
- Production: 2003–2023

Body and chassis
- Class: Compact platform
- Related: Ford EUCD platform

Chronology
- Predecessor: Ford C170 platform
- Successor: Ford C2 platform Volvo CMA

The Volvo P1/Mazda BK/Ford Global C-car Platform is Ford's global compact car automobile platform. It replaces the Ford C170 platform and Mazda B platform (BJ). The C1 platform debuted with the European Ford Focus C-Max compact MPV in early 2004. The platform is designed for either front- or all-wheel drive.

First called the C1 platform, it was designed in Ford's European development center in Cologne, Germany, as the "C Technologies Program". It was said to be one of the largest platform programs in history at that time. The Ford Focus, Volvo S40 and V50, and Mazda3 (BK and BL) share about 60% of their parts and components. Thirty engineers each from Ford, Mazda, and Volvo worked in Cologne for two years to combine the compact-car engineering for all three automakers under the direction of Ford Director of C Technologies Derrick Kuzak, Ford of Europe vice president of product development.

The platform has been stretched creating the EUCD for use in future Volvo vehicles.

Among all of the cars, the floorpan is different, but the front and rear subframes, suspension, steering, braking, safety, and some electrical components are shared.

Vehicles using this first iteration of the platform include:

- 2003–2008 Mazda3/Axela (BK) (Note: production continued in China through 2013)
- 2003–2010 Ford Focus C-Max (first generation) (C214), first European vehicle on this platform
- 2004–2010 Ford Focus (second generation, Europe) (C307) (Note: the Ford Focus (North America) continued on the C170 platform through 2011)
- 2004–2012 Volvo S40 II (P11)
- 2004–2012 Volvo V50 (P12)
- 2005–2010 Mazda Premacy/Mazda 5 (CR) (and related Ford i-Max)
- 2006–2013 Volvo C70 II (P15)
- 2007–2013 Volvo C30 (P14)
- 2008–2012 Ford Kuga (C394)
- 2008–2013 Mazda Biante
- 2006–2012 Mazda CX-7
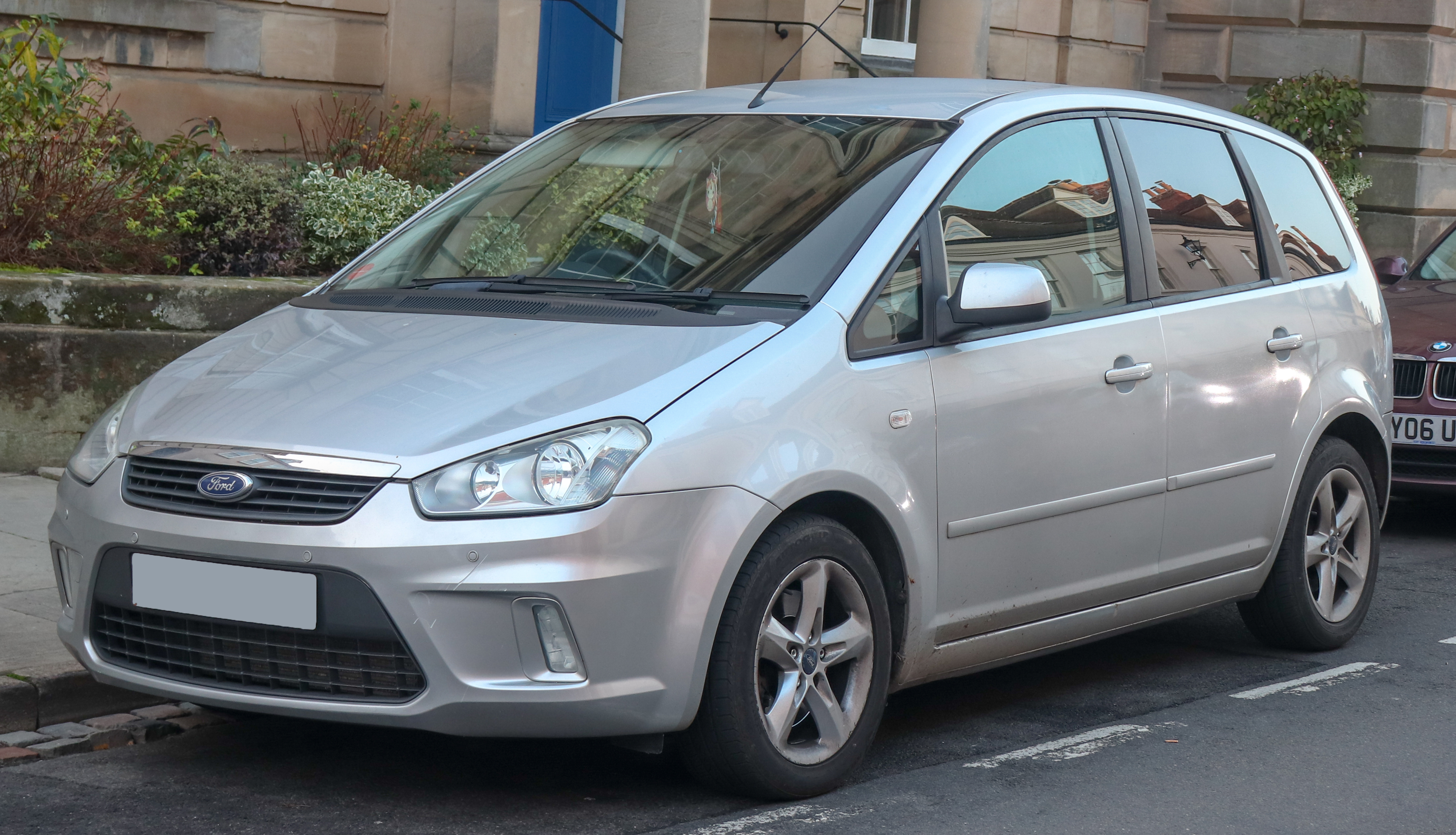
Ford C-Max

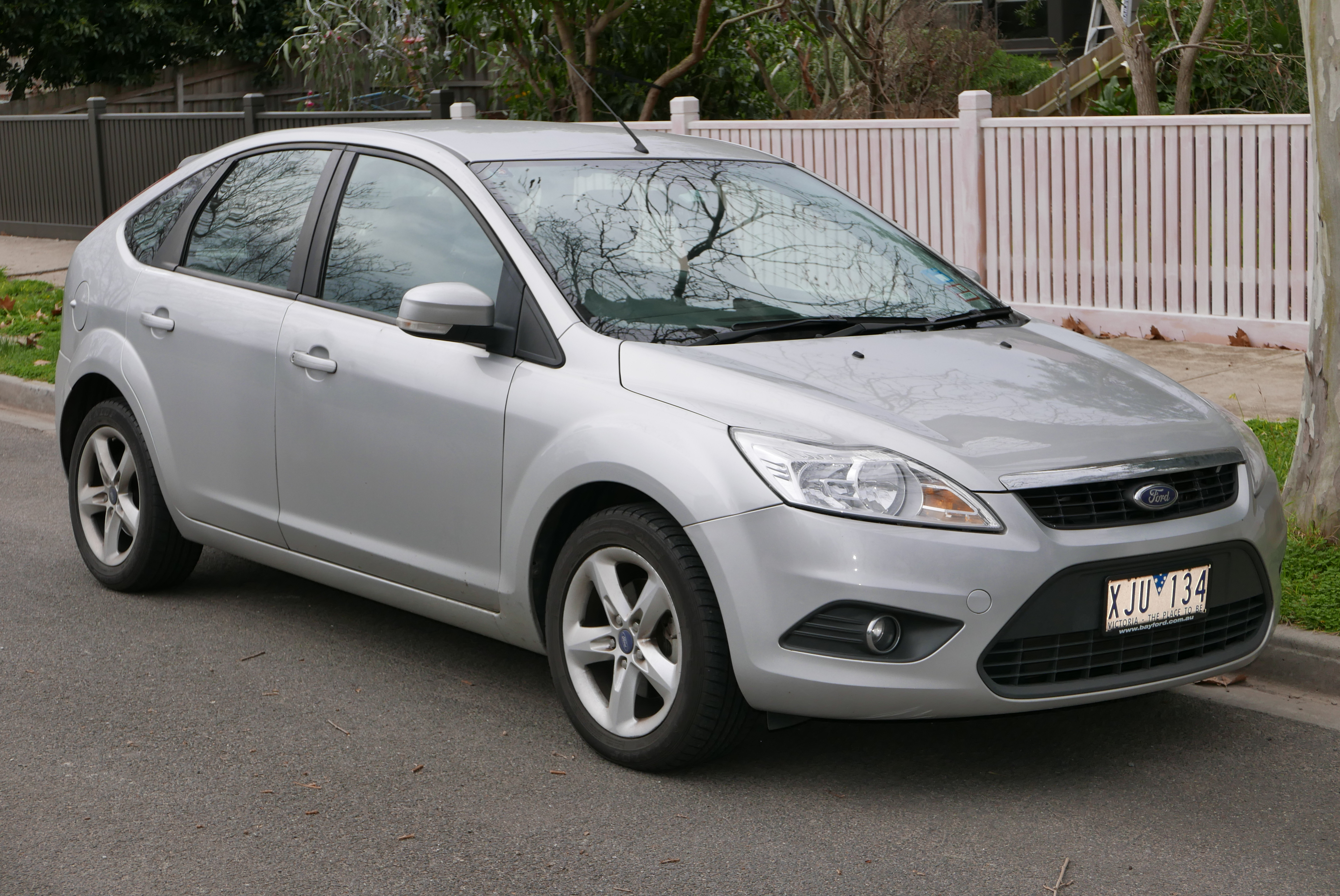
Ford Focus

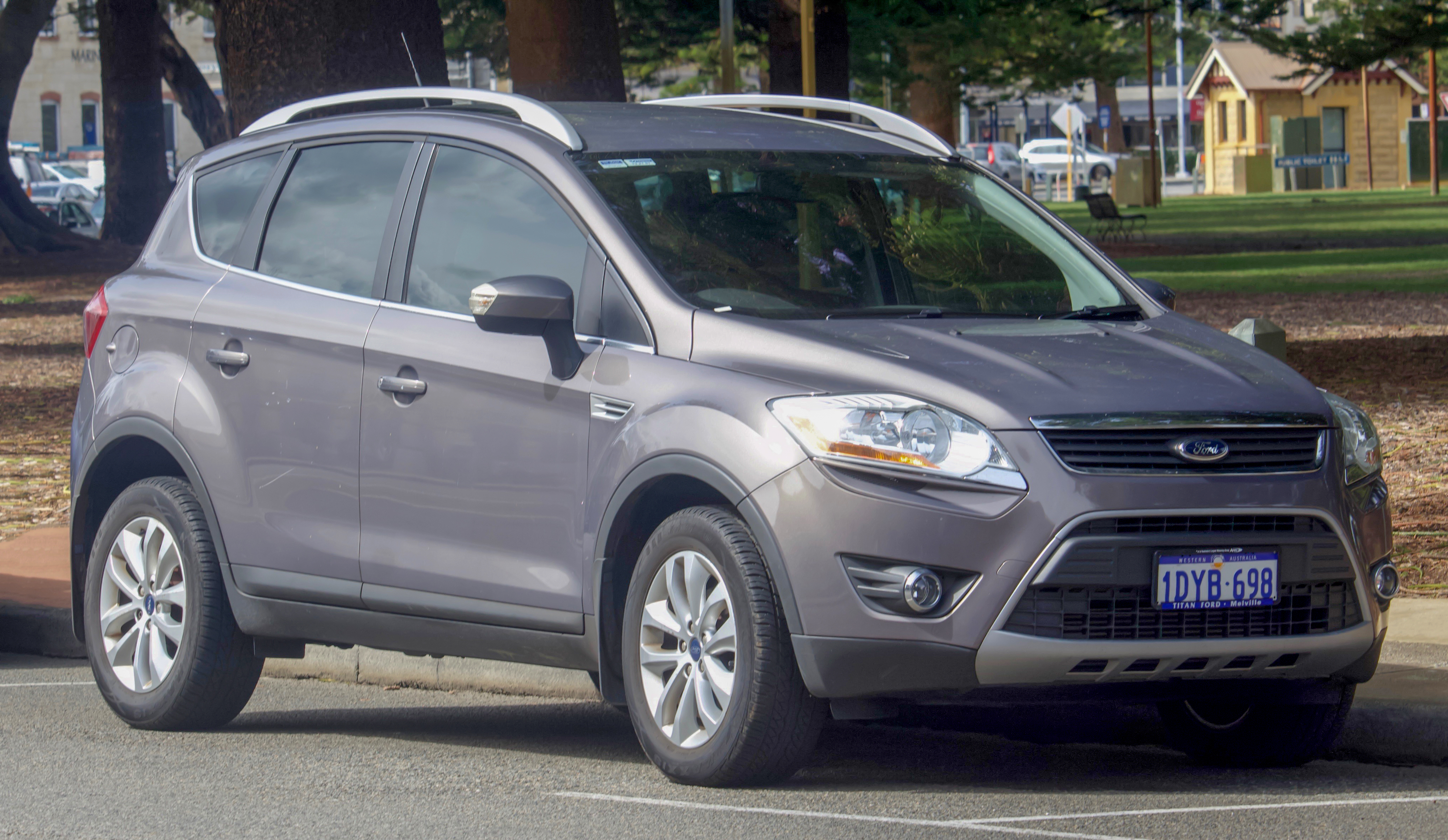
Ford Kuga

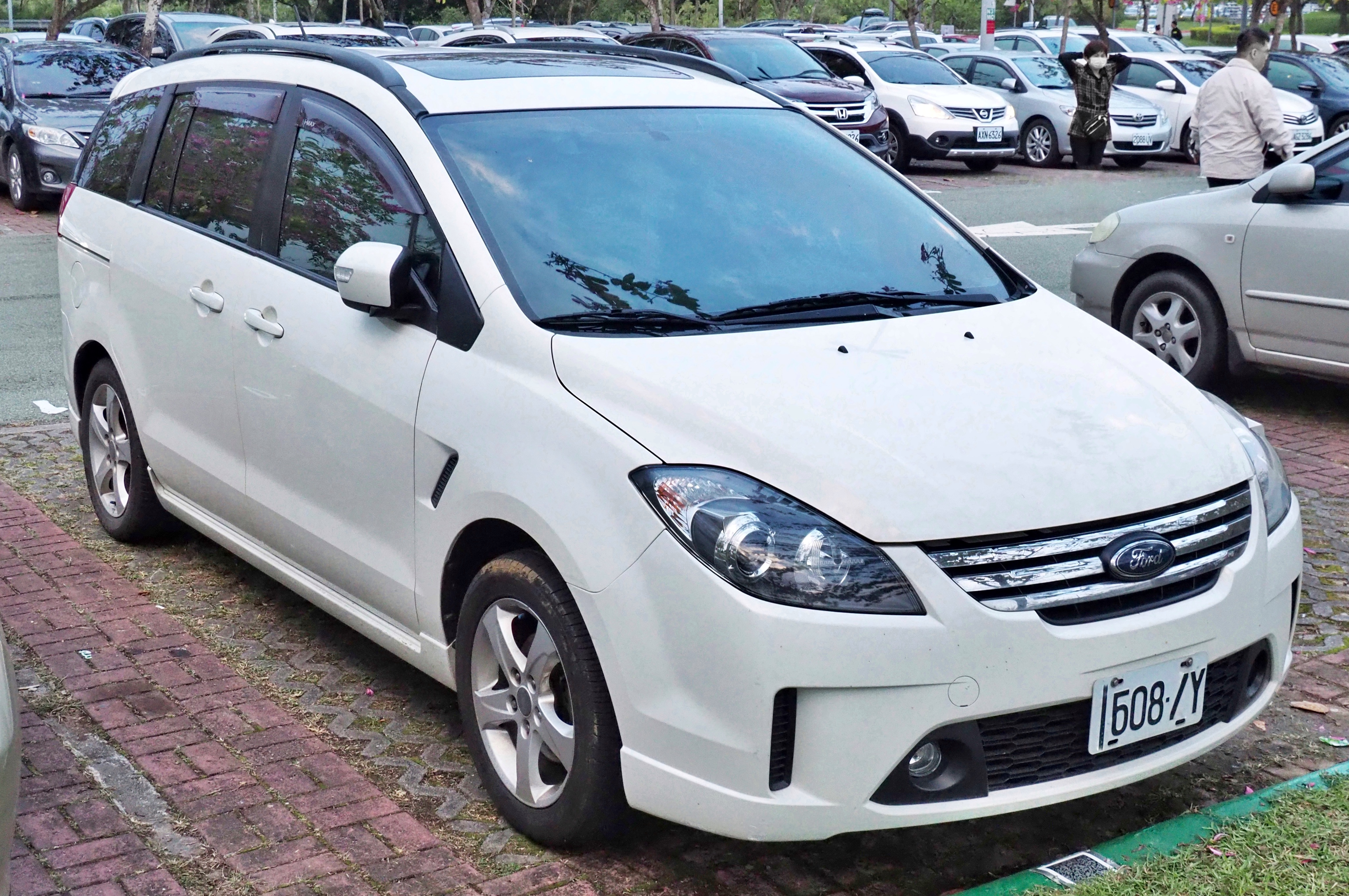
Ford i-Max

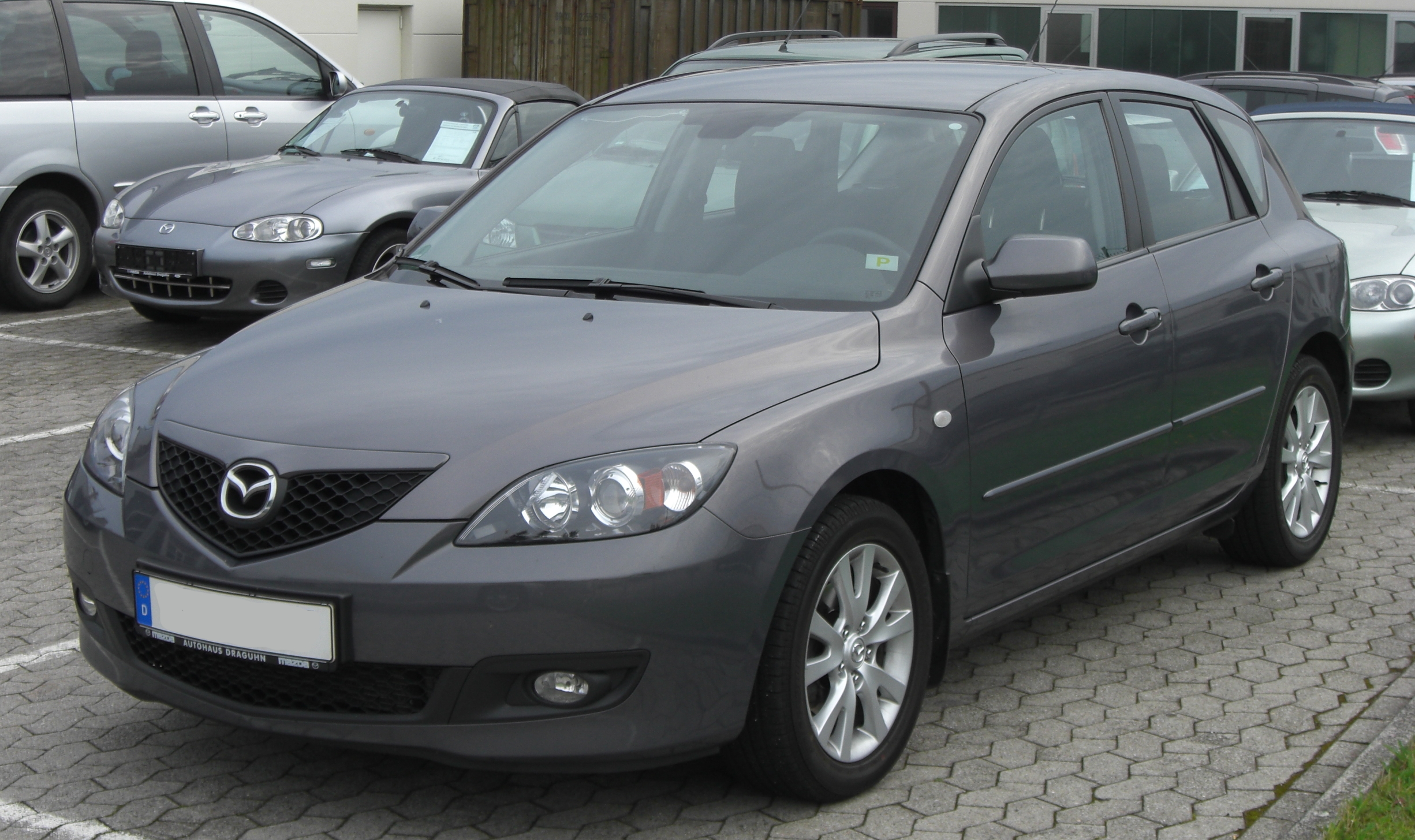
Mazda3/Axela

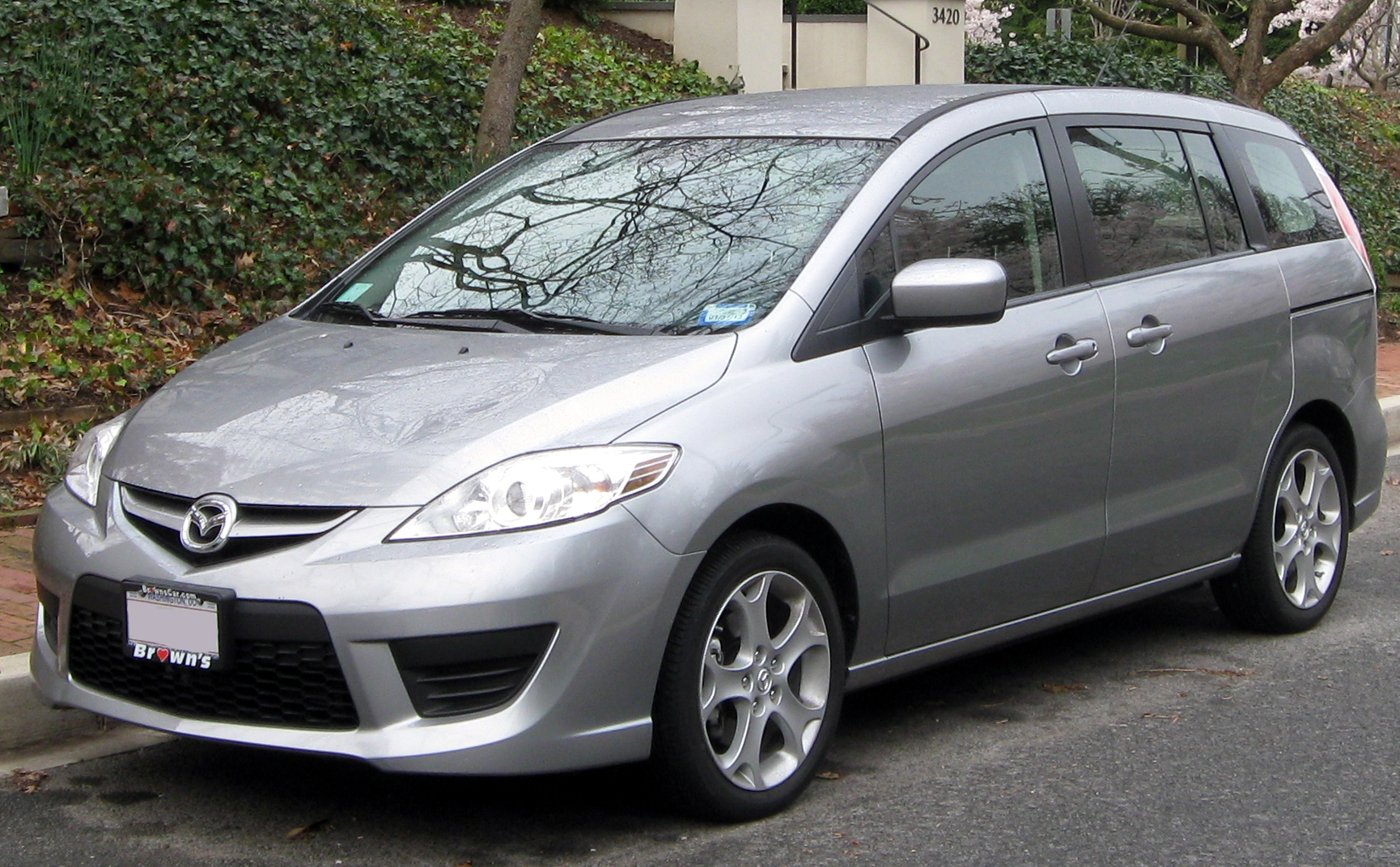
Mazda Premacy/Mazda 5

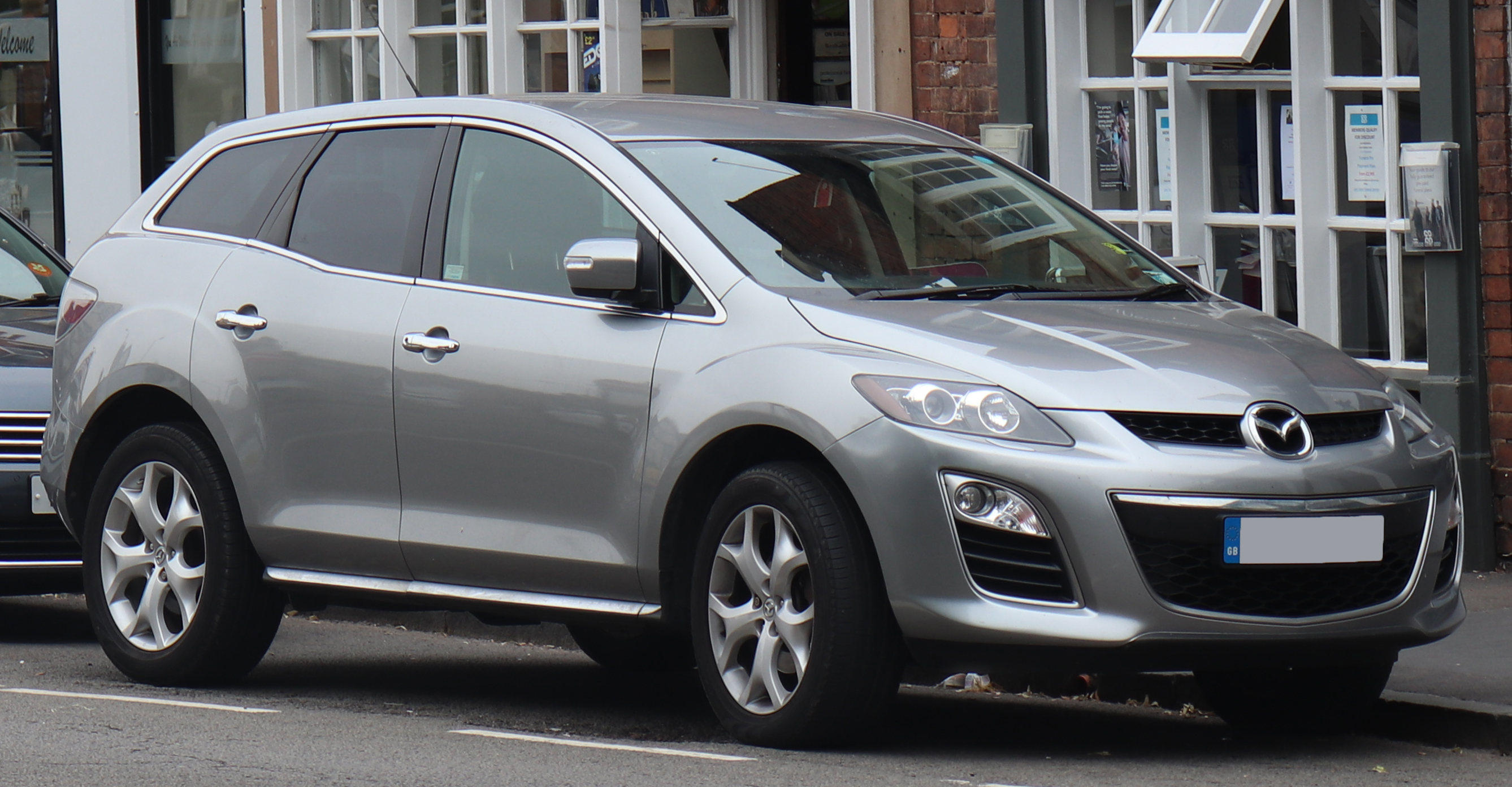
Mazda CX-7

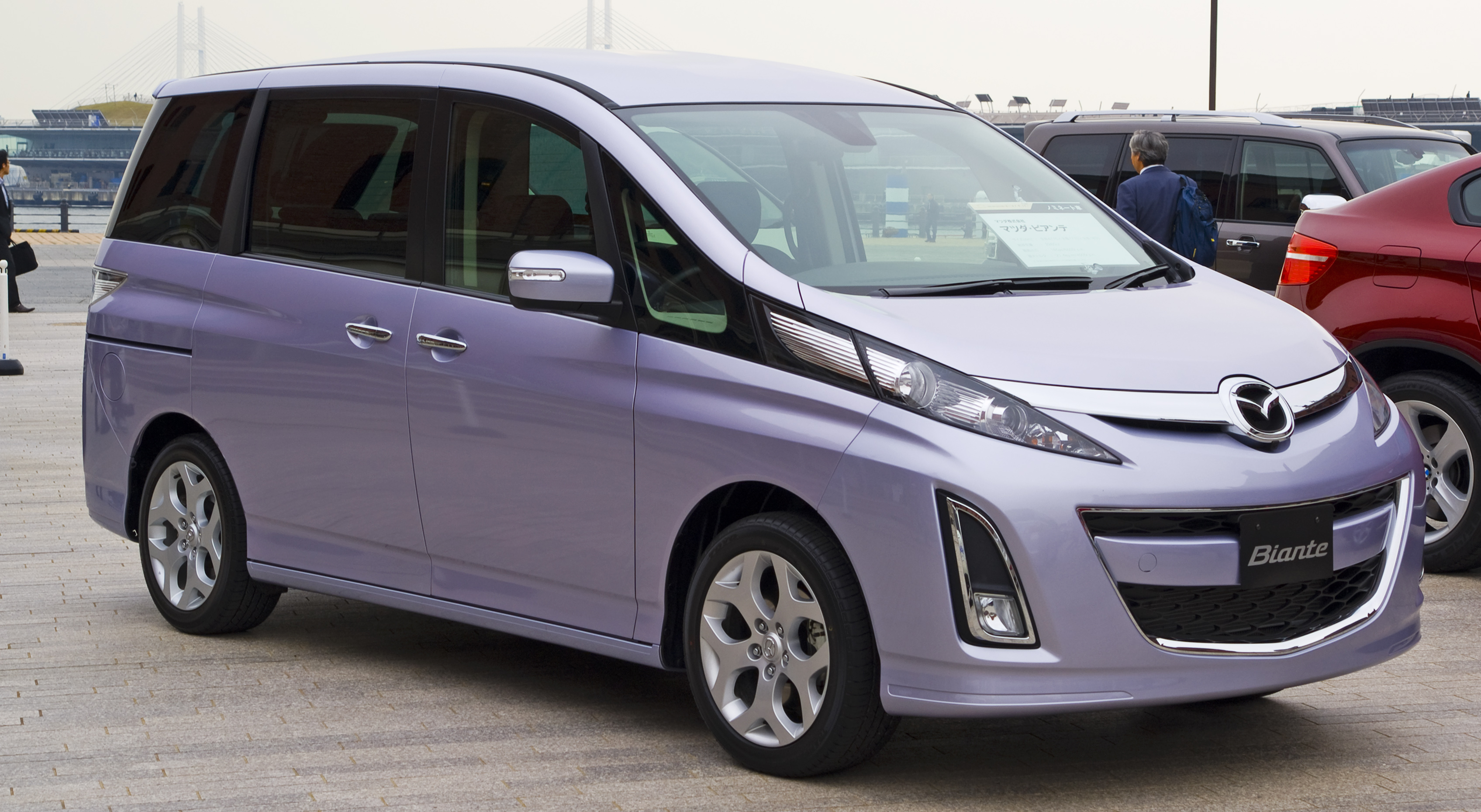
Mazda Biante

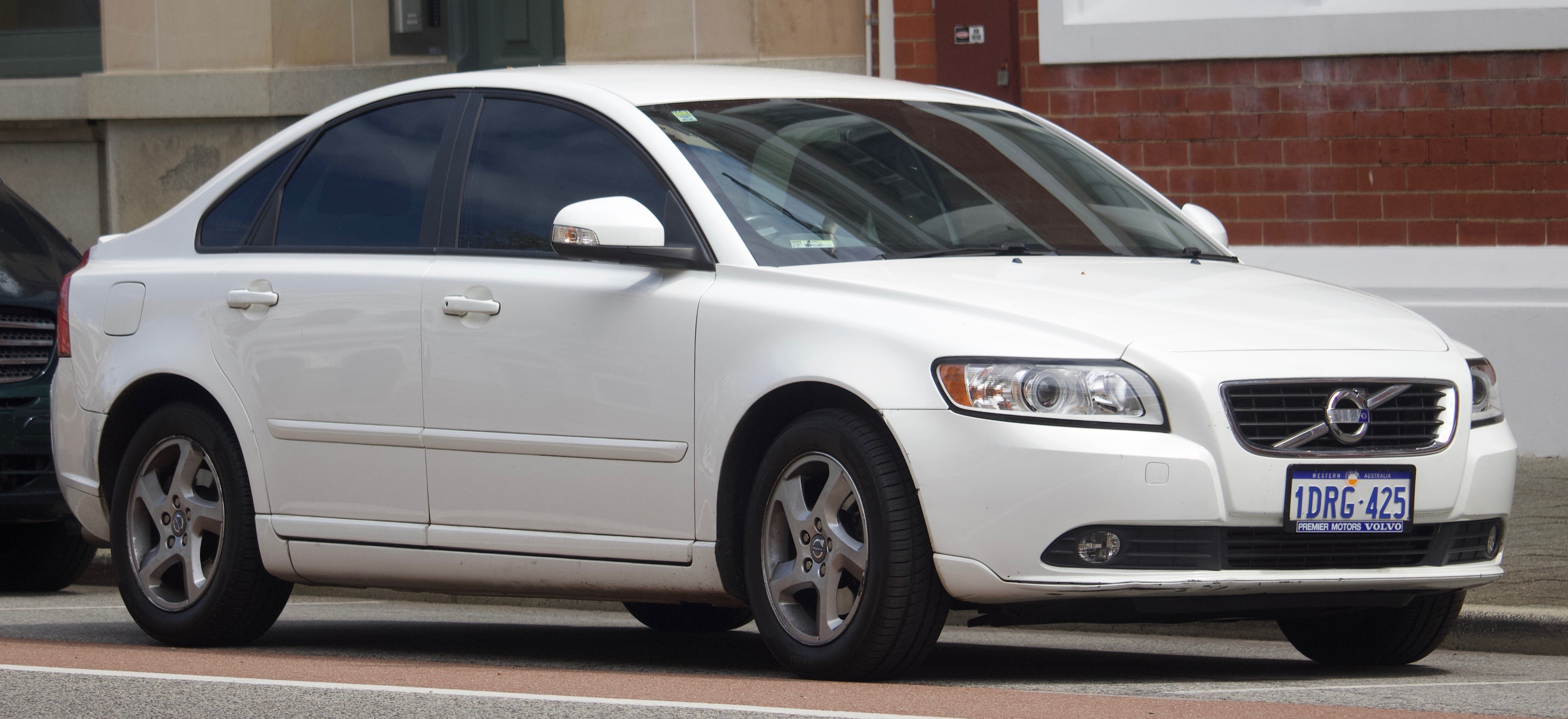
Volvo S40

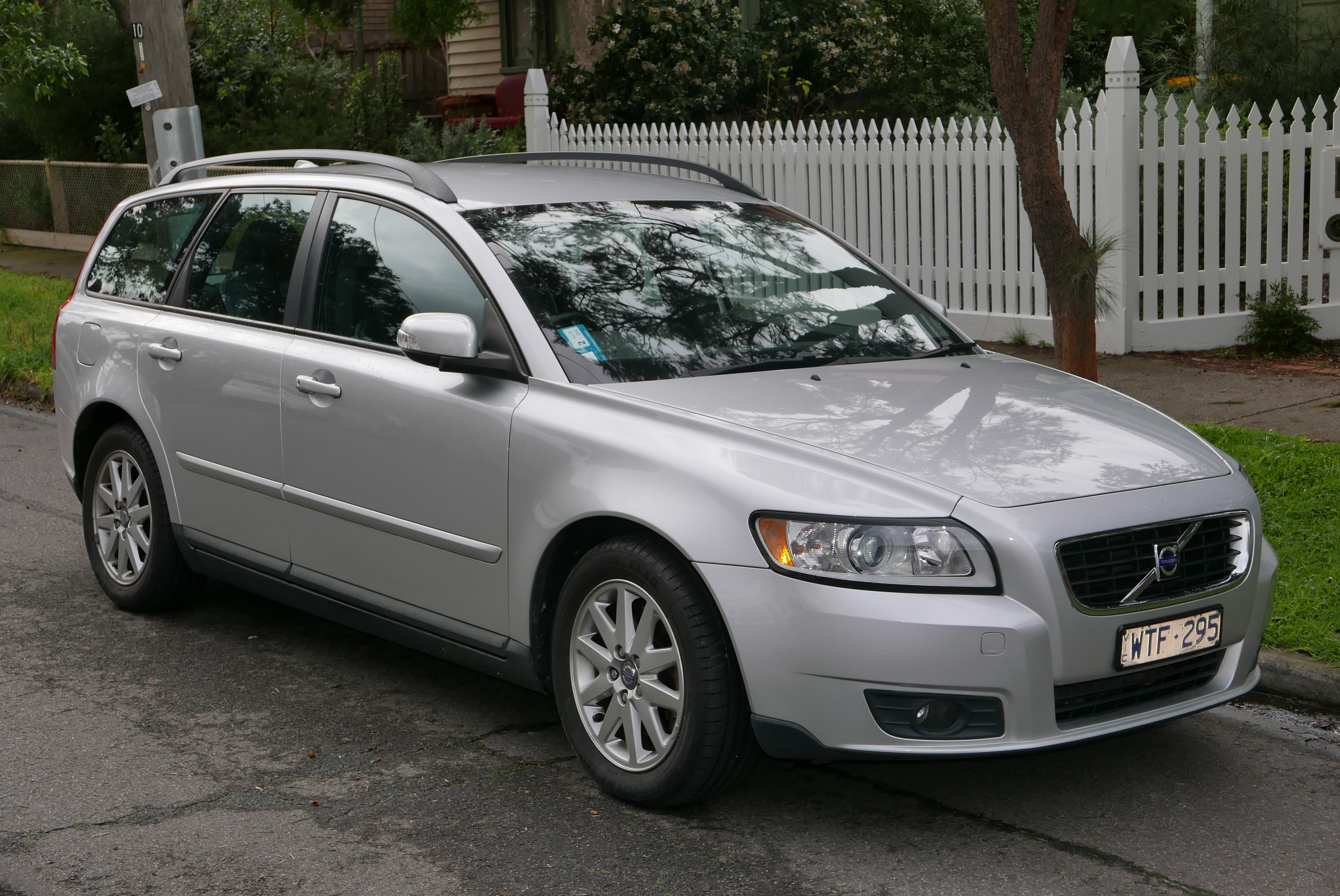
Volvo V50

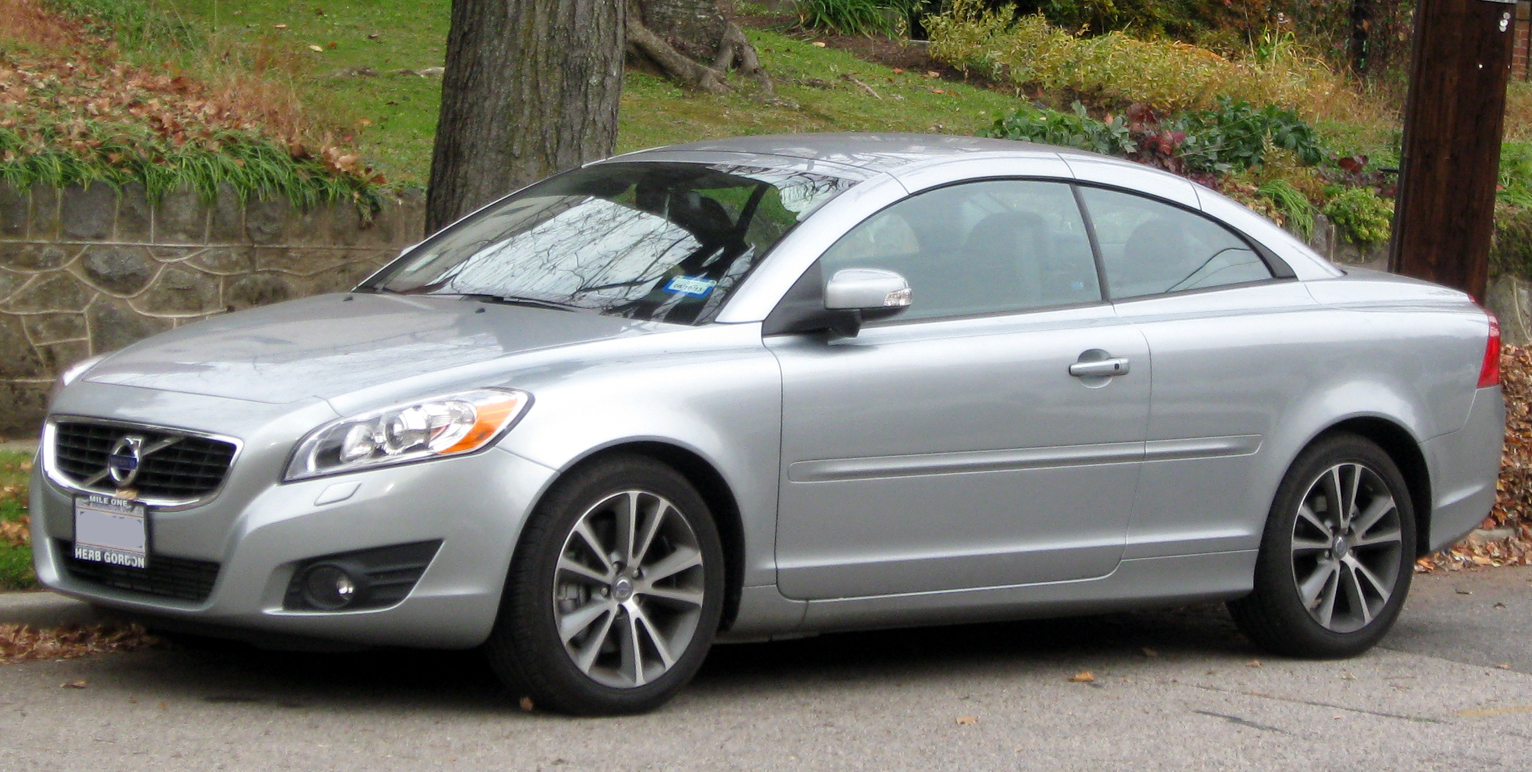
Volvo C70

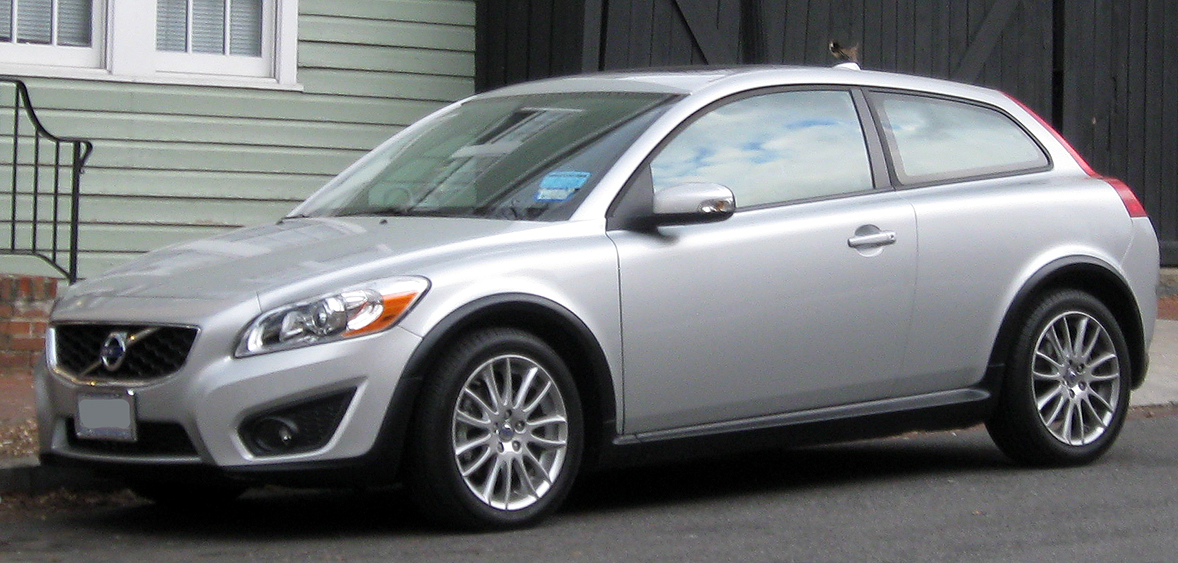
Volvo C30

== Second generation ==
The C1 platform has been replaced by the global C platform (or C-car) and combines three previous platforms as part of Ford's "One Ford" efficiency drive.

Ford global C platform vehicles:

- 2011–2019 Ford C-Max (second generation) (C344) and Grand C-Max
- 2012–2018 Ford Focus (C346)
- 2013–2019 Ford Escape / Ford Kuga (C520)
- 2015–2019 Lincoln MKC
- 2013–2023 Ford Transit Connect
- 2015–2023 Ford Escort (China)

Vehicles partially based on global C platform:

- 2009–2013 Mazda Axela/Mazda3 (J68/BL)
- 2010–2018 Mazda Premacy/Mazda5 (CW)
- 2013–2019 Volvo V40 II/V40 Cross Country (Y555/Y556)
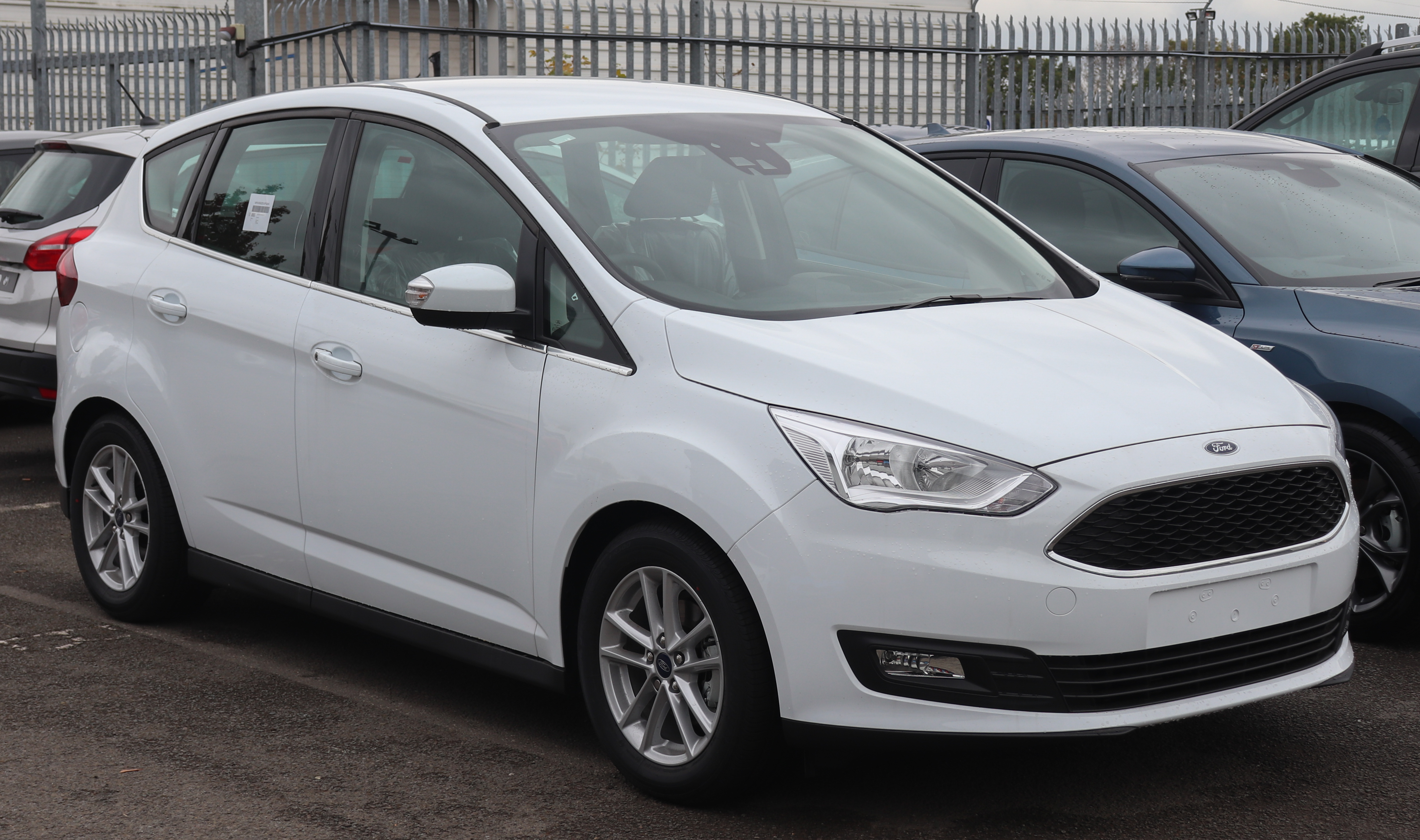
Ford C-Max

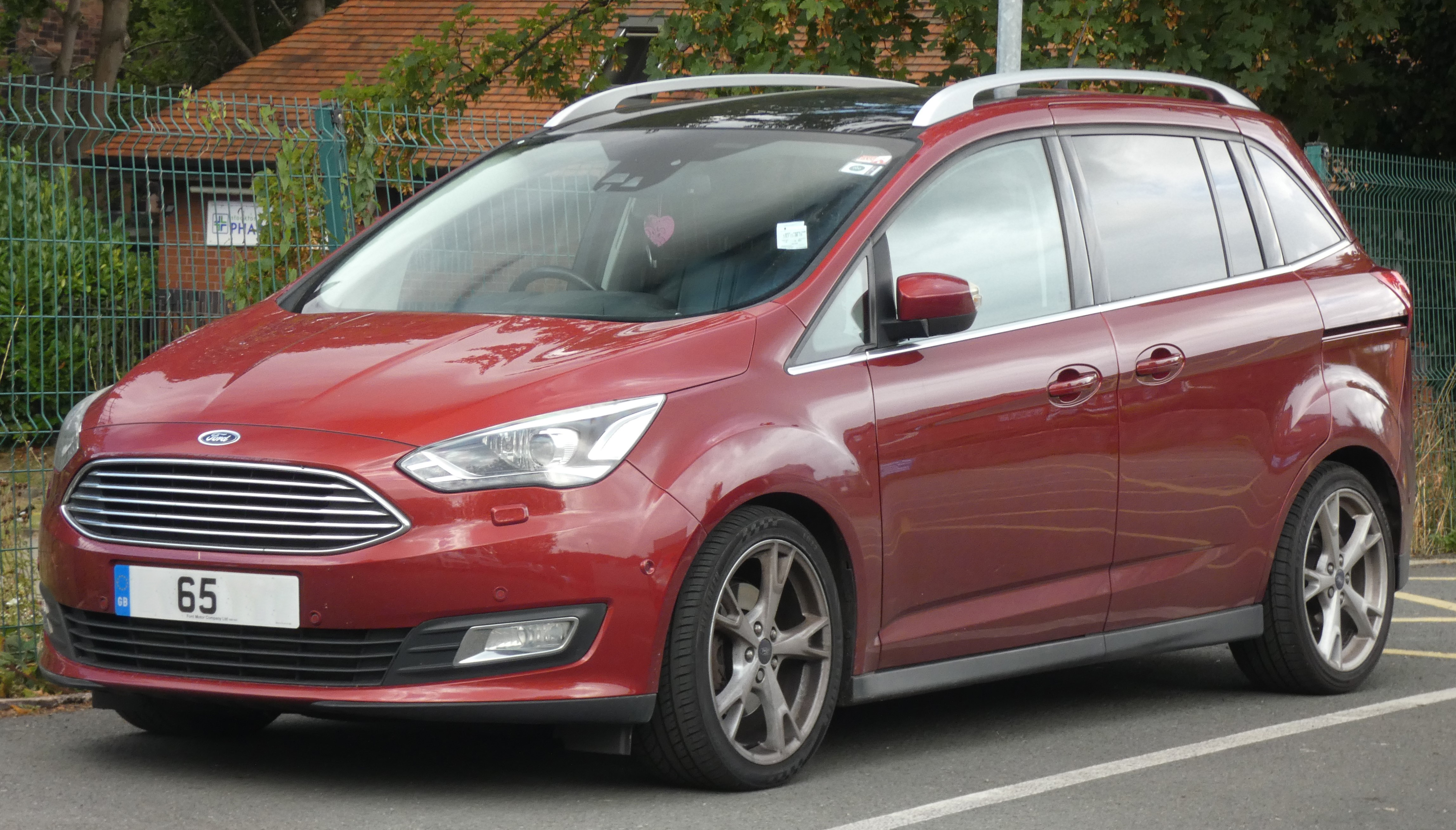
Ford Grand C-Max

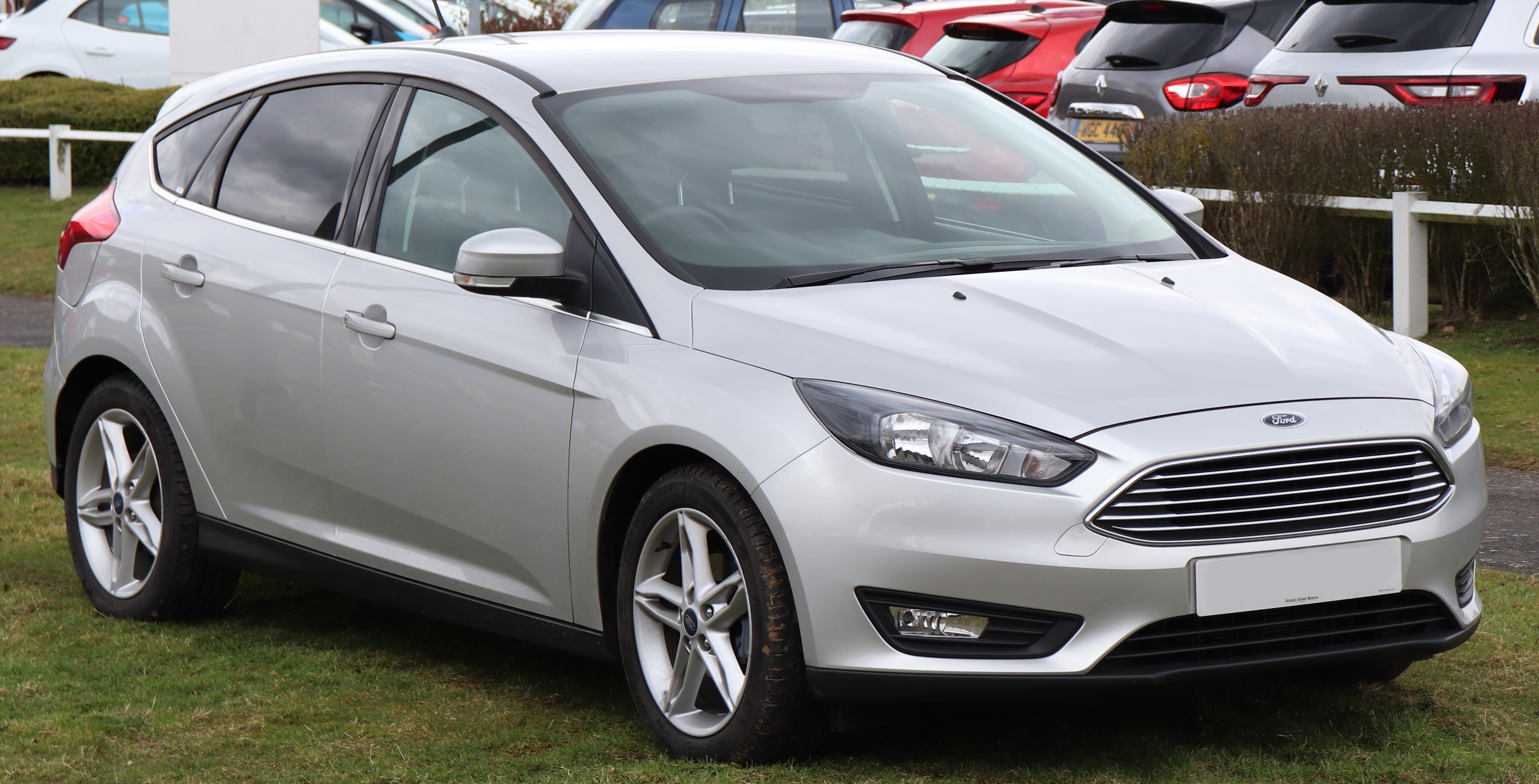
Ford Focus

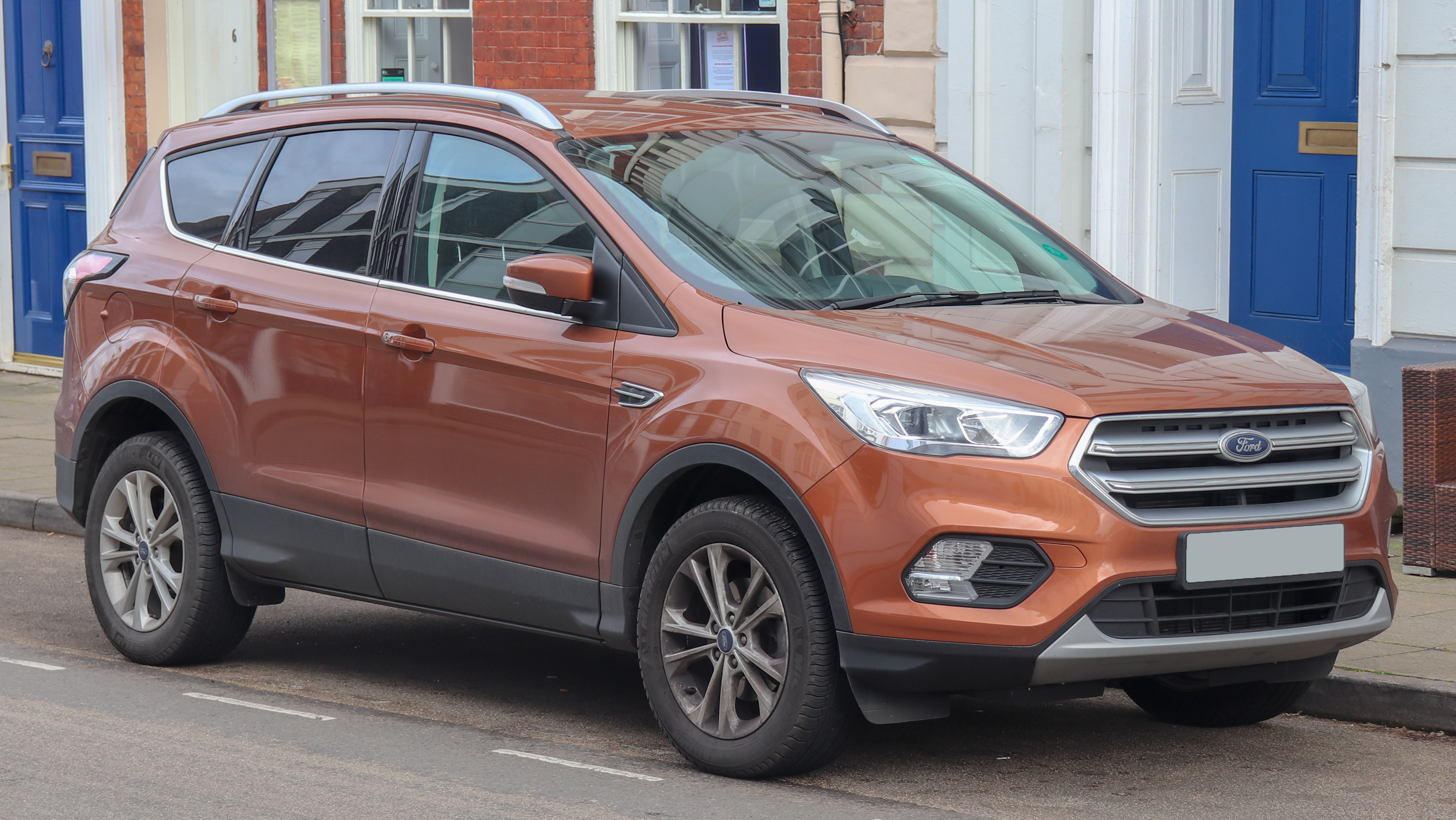
Ford Kuga

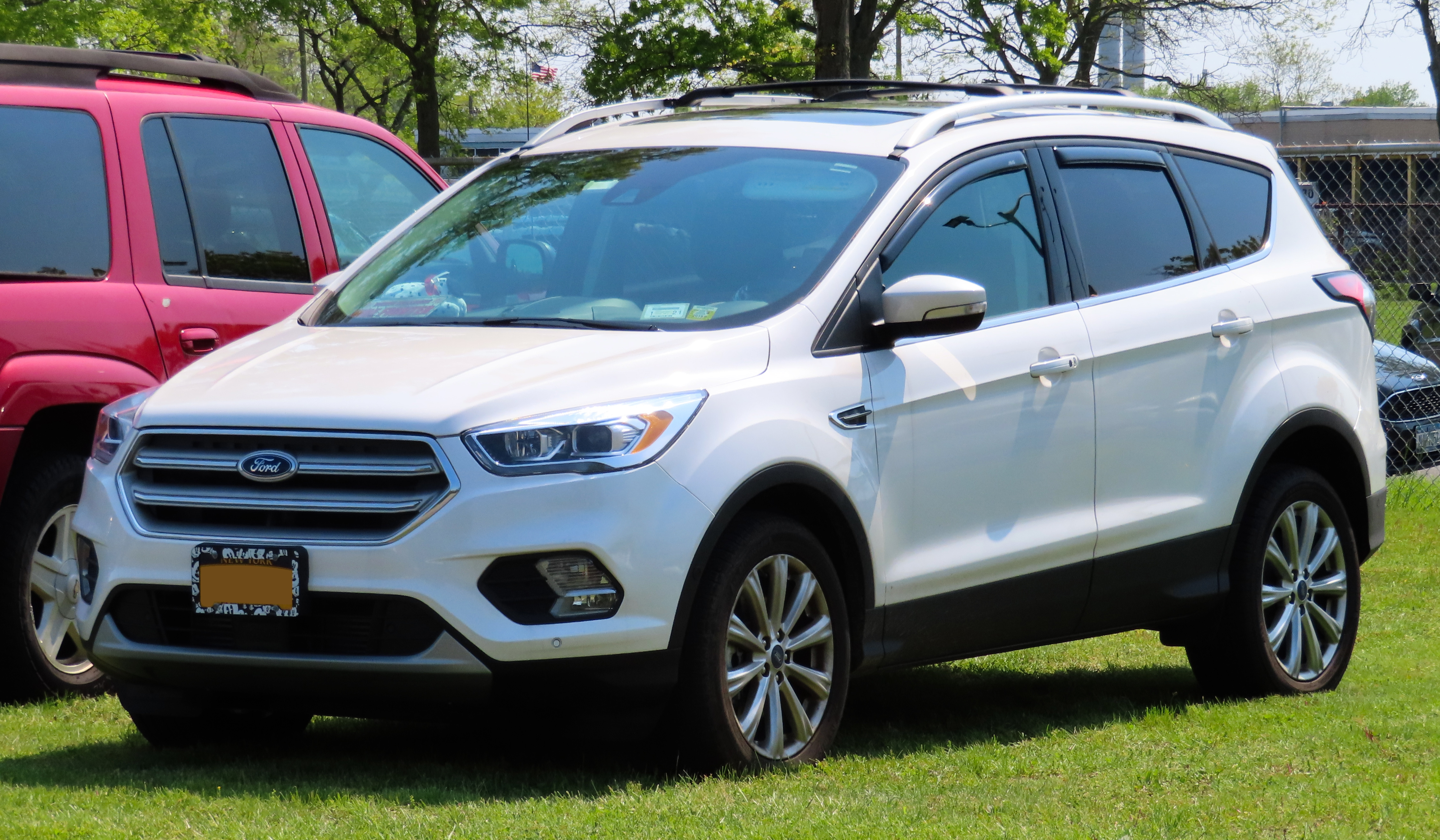
Ford Escape

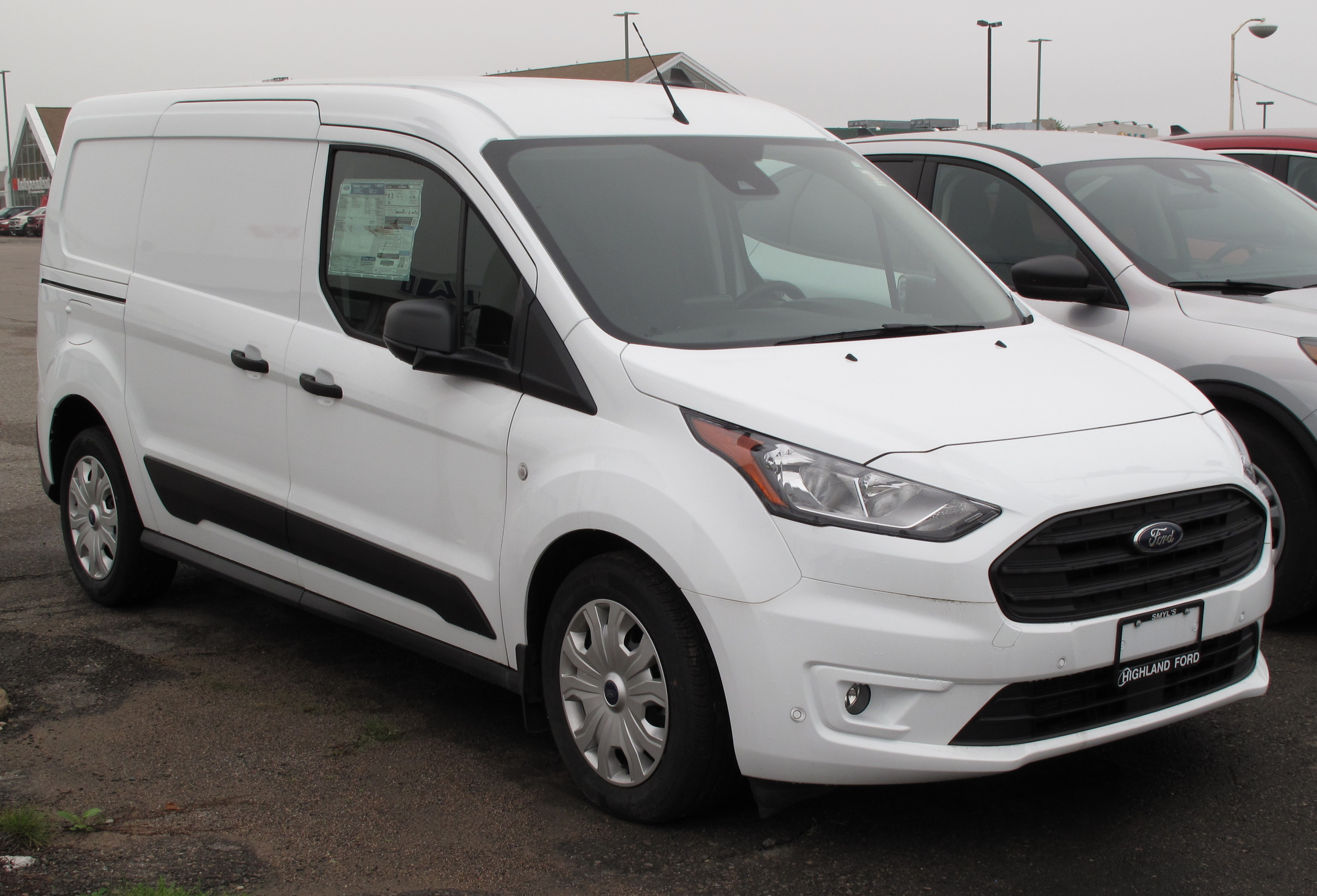
Ford Transit Connect

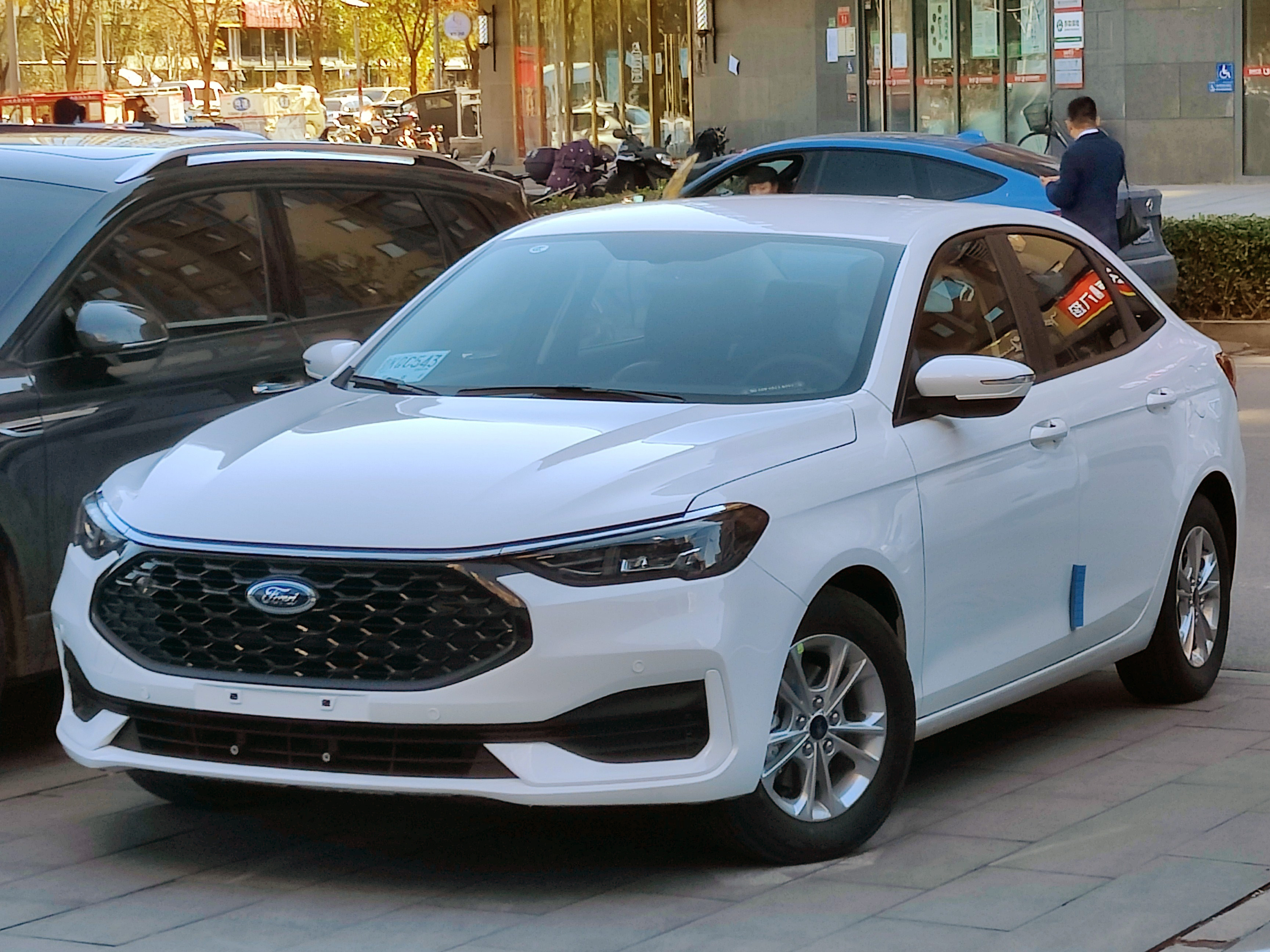
Ford Escort

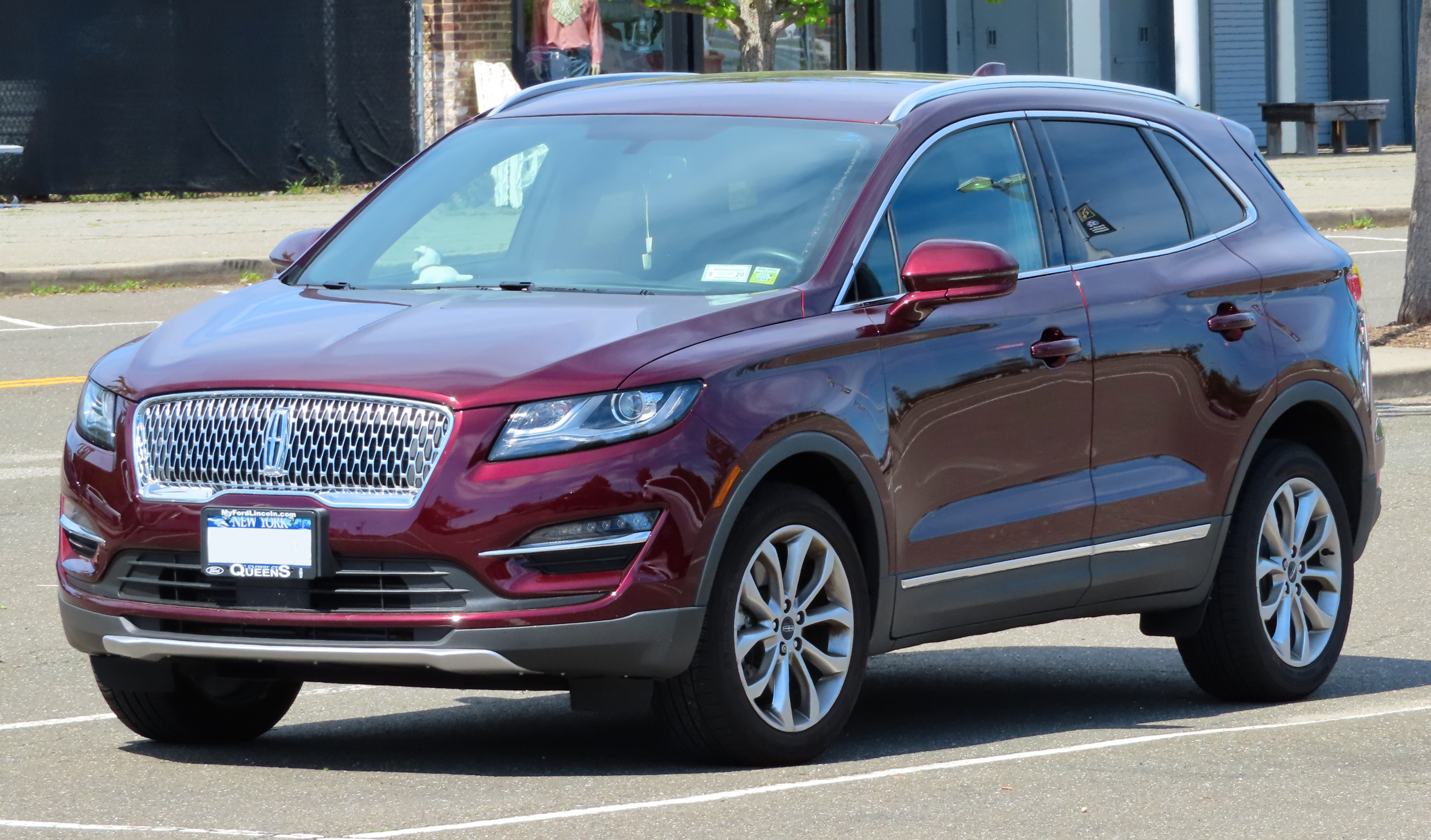
Lincoln MKC

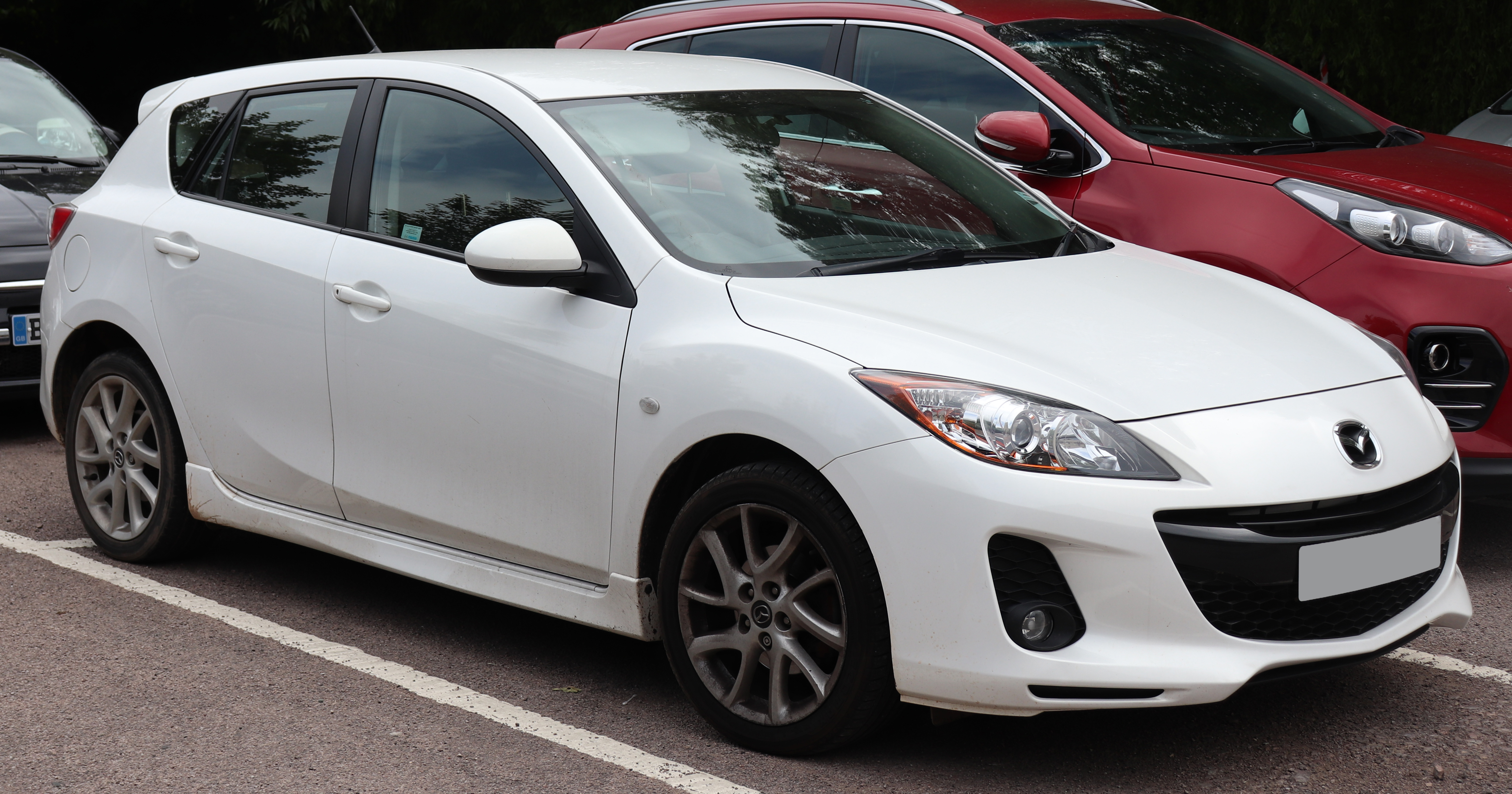
Mazda3/Axela

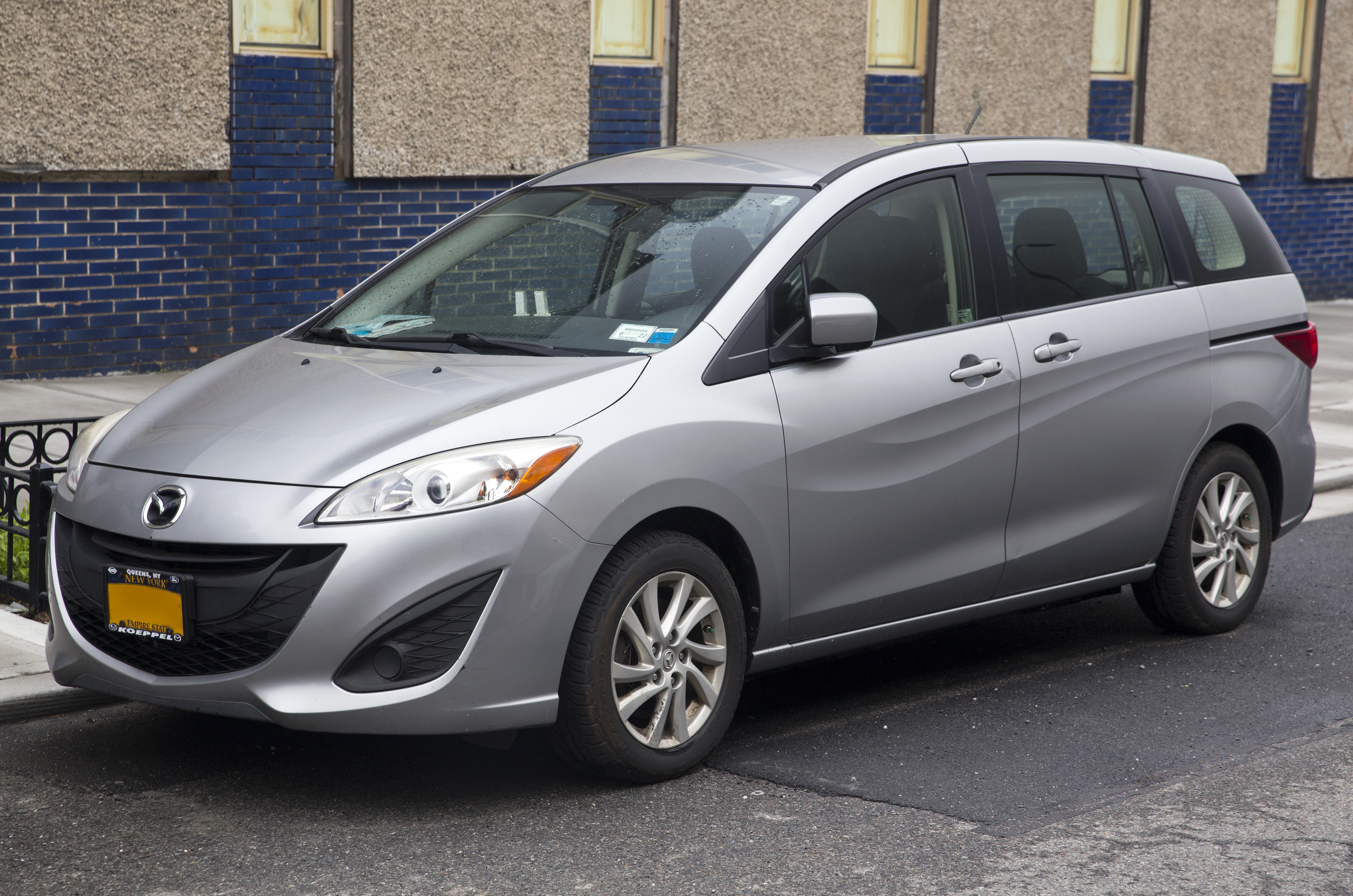
Mazda Premacy/Mazda 5

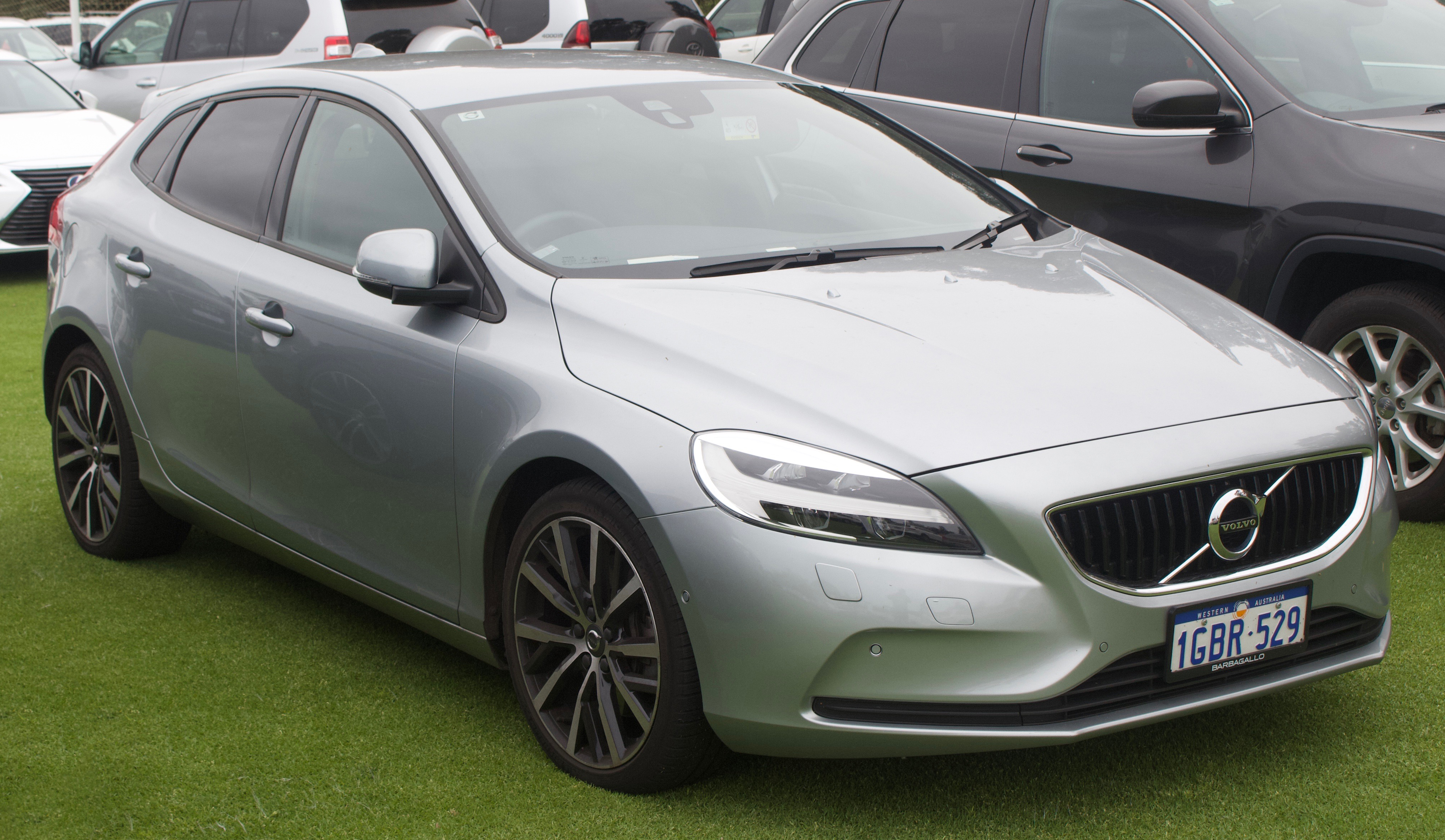
Volvo V40

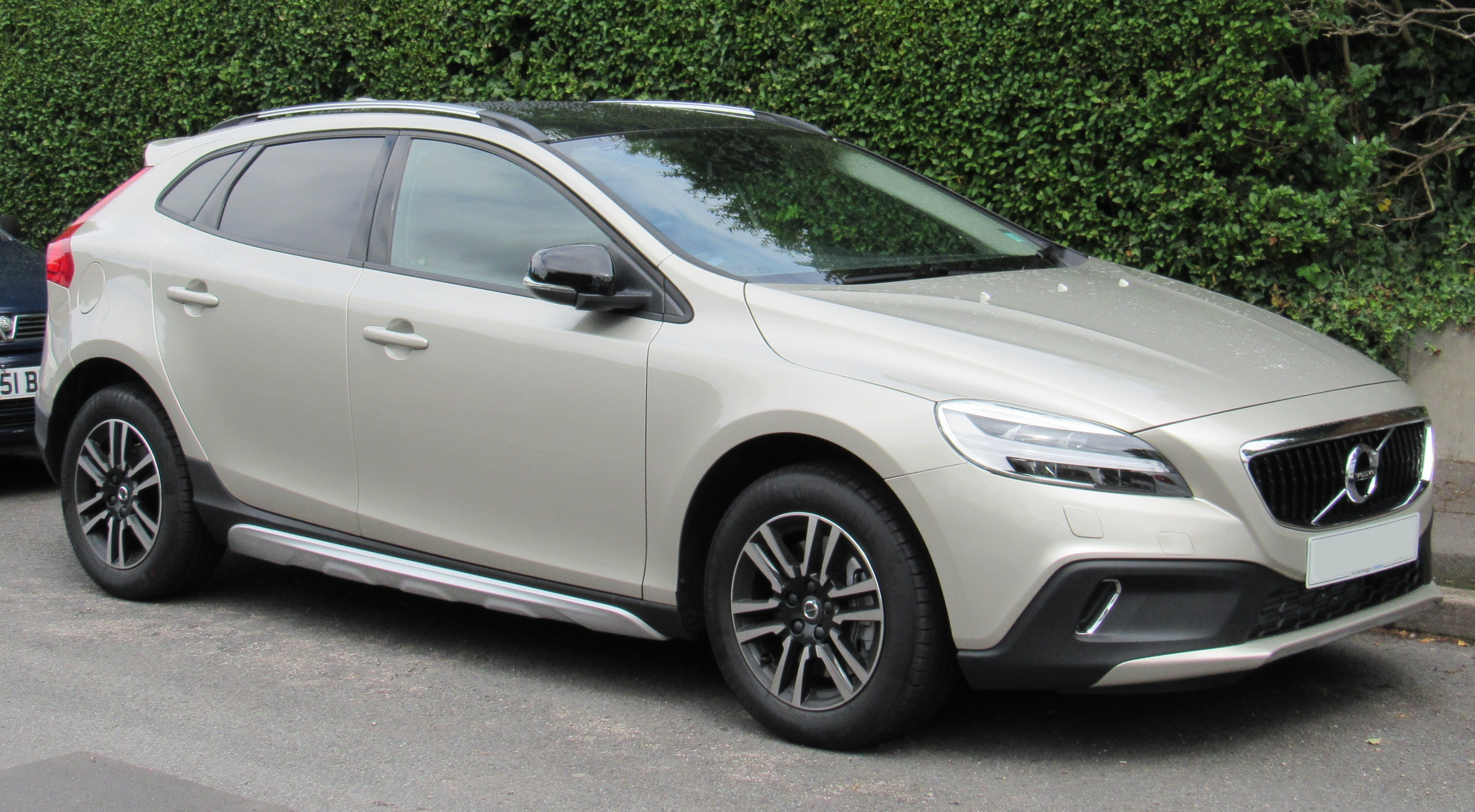
Volvo V40 Cross Country
