= LG C1 =

OLED television released in 2021

- Manufacturer: LG Electronics
- Product family: C
- Type: Television
- Released: March 2021
- Introductory price: $1,799 (55"); $5,999 (83")
- Weight: 14.9–41.6kg
- Predecessor: LG CX
- Successor: LG C2

The LG C1 is LG's OLED television set released in 2021. It is a successor to LG CX (2020). LC C1 was announced in January 2021. It was released at the end of March 2021. There are 48, 55, 65, 77, and 83-inch variants. The 83 inch variant was released in May 2021. LG released a successor, LG C2, in 2022.

== Features ==
Unlike the CX model, C1 has an 83 inch variant and a new version of the webOS interface. C1 includes the new Game Optimizer settings that includes an option to reduce input lag.

== Reception ==
TechRadar said: "As a follow-up to one of the best TVs from last year, the LG C1 OLED remains one of the best TVs at any price." IGN wrote: "But while Sony edges out LG on pure picture quality thanks to its software, and Vizio tends to offer more affordable pricing, with the C1, LG continues to show what ideal balance in a 4K TV really looks like." RTINGS.com called it "an amazing TV". They also reviewed the 48 inch variant as a computer monitor and called it "an excellent overall TV". CNET said that the C1 offers picture quality comparable to the CX, but with additional gaming options. Tom's Guide noted it as "one of the best TVs you can buy, and definitely the best choice for gamers." What Hi-Fi? summarized: "The C1 isn’t much of a step-up from the CX, but it didn’t need to be – this is a superb TV at a competitive price". PCMag liked the fantastic contrast and color, and the gaming features but disliked the occasionally glitchy interface.
