= 2004 California Proposition 58 =

Budget referendum

Proposition 58 was a California ballot proposition on the March 2, 2004 ballot. It passed with 4,535,084 (71.2%) votes in favor and 1,841,138 (28.8%) against. It was officially called the California Balanced Budget Act. It requires the state legislature to pass a balanced budget every year, which means that budgeted recurrent expenditure, including repayment of past debt, does not exceed estimated revenue. The act does not require that capital works programs be funded out of current revenues. The California Constitution has always allowed bond issues (state debt) for specified capital works, above a certain value. Bond measures must be approved by a statewide ballot.

The Act created a reserve fund called the Budget Stabilization Account in case of future financial trouble. It also prevented the creation of any future bonds to pay off deficits like that in Proposition 57 (the California Economic Recovery Bond Act). Proposition 58 took effect only because Proposition 57 also passed.

Propositions 57 and 58 were the centerpiece of Governor Arnold Schwarzenegger's plan to resolve California's budget problems. Schwarzenegger campaigned heavily for both propositions' passage.

While Prop 58 was to provide balanced California budgets, the deficits continued in subsequent years, growing larger over time.

== Official summary ==
- Requires enactment of a balanced budget where General Fund expenditures do not exceed estimated General Fund revenues.
- Allows the Governor to proclaim a fiscal emergency in specified circumstances, and submit proposed legislation to address the fiscal emergency.
- Requires the Legislature to stop other action and act on legislation proposed to address the emergency.
- Establishes a budget reserve.
- Provides that the California Economic Recovery Bond Act is for a single object or work.
- Prohibits any future deficit bonds.

Summary of Legislative Analyst's Estimate of Net State and Local Government Fiscal Impact:

- Unknown net state fiscal effects, which will vary year by year and depend in part on actions of future Legislatures.
- Reserve provisions may smooth state spending, with reductions during economic expansions and increases during downturns.
- Balanced budget and debt limitation provisions can result in more immediate actions to correct budgetary shortfalls.

Results by county: Yes: 50–60%; 60–70%; 70–80%
