= CL =

CL or cl may refer to:

== Arts and entertainment ==
- CL (rapper), (born Lee Chae-rin, 1991), singer and rapper, leader of the K-pop girl group 2NE1
- Creative Loafing, a newspaper publisher

== Brands and enterprises ==
- Colgate-Palmolive's NYSE stock symbol
- Companhia das Lezírias, an agribusiness company in Portugal

== Computing and technology ==
- cl.exe, the command-line C/C++ compiler for Microsoft Visual C++
- .cl, Internet country code top-level domain for Chile
- CL register, the low byte of an X86 16-bit CX register
- CAS latency, a measure used in computer memory
- Common Lisp, a programming language
- Common Logic, a framework for a family of logic languages
- Control Language, a scripting language for the IBM AS/400 midrange platform

== Industry and technology ==
- CL, the prefix for Canadair manufactured aircraft model numbers
- Caseless ammunition

== Organizations ==
- Catholic League (U.S.), also known as The Catholic League for Religious and Civil Rights
- Communion and Liberation, a lay ecclesial movement within the Catholic Church

== Places ==
- Chile's ISO country code
- Province of Caltanissetta's ISO 3166-2:IT code
- Călărași County's ISO 3166-2:RO code

== Science ==
- Cathodoluminescence, emission of photons after excitation by electrons
- Centilitre (cL), a metric measure of volume
- Chlorine, symbol Cl, a chemical element
- cl (elliptic function), cosine lemniscate function
- Clifford algebra, denoted Cl
- Confidence level
- Divisor class group, denoted Cl
- Lift coefficient (C_{L})
- Topological closure ($\operatorname{cl} X$)
- Clearance (pharmacology) ($Cl_\text{tot}$)

== Sports ==
- Closer (baseball), a relief pitcher who specializes in finishing a game
- Central League, one of two leagues in Japan's Nippon Professional Baseball
- Central League (New Zealand), association football league in New Zealand
- Continental League, a 1959 proposed third major league for baseball in Canada and the United States

== Transportation ==
- Acura CL, a Japanese-American mid-size coupe
- Mercedes-Benz CL-Class, a German sports car
- A US Navy hull classification symbol: Light cruiser (CL)
- Lufthansa CityLine's IATA code

== Other uses ==
- Certificated Location, a Caravan Club site
- 150 (number) or CL in Roman numerals
- Light crude oil's New York Mercantile Exchange symbol
- Shilluk language's ISO 639-1 language code
- Centerline, an engineering drawing symbol, stylized by an overlapping C and L (℄)

== See also ==
- C1 (disambiguation)
- CI (disambiguation)
- Champions League (disambiguation), various sports organizations
