= Prostaglandin-A1 Delta-isomerase =

Prostaglandin-A_{1} Δ-isomerase

Identifiers
- EC no.: 5.3.3.9
- CAS no.: 9055-01-0

Databases
- IntEnz: IntEnz view
- BRENDA: BRENDA entry
- ExPASy: NiceZyme view
- KEGG: KEGG entry
- MetaCyc: metabolic pathway
- PRIAM: profile
- PDB structures: RCSB PDB PDBe PDBsum
- Gene Ontology: AmiGO / QuickGO
Search
- PMC: articles
- PubMed: articles
- NCBI: proteins

In enzymology, a Prostaglandin-A_{1} Δ-isomerase (EC 5.3.3.9) is an enzyme that catalyzes the chemical reaction

(13E)-(15S)-15-hydroxy-9-oxoprosta-10,13-dienoate $\rightleftharpoons$ (13E)-(15S)-15-hydroxy-9-oxoprosta-11,13-dienoate

Hence, this enzyme has one substrate, (13E)-(15S)-15-hydroxy-9-oxoprosta-10,13-dienoate (Prostaglandin A1 or PGA1), and one product, (13E)-(15S)-15-hydroxy-9-oxoprosta-11,13-dienoate (Prostaglandin C1).

This enzyme belongs to the family of isomerases, specifically those intramolecular oxidoreductases transposing C=C bonds. The systematic name of this enzyme class is (13E)-(15S)-15-hydroxy-9-oxoprosta-10,13-dienoate Delta10-Delta11-isomerase. This enzyme is also called prostaglandin A isomerase.
