= Southern Cross Airport (New Jersey) =

Coordinates: 39°39′20.000″N 075°00′52.00″W

- IATA: none; ICAO: none; FAA LID: C01

Summary
- Airport type: Public
- Owner/Operator: Edward A. Carter
- Serves: Williamstown, New Jersey
- Location: Gloucester County, New Jersey
- Elevation AMSL: 145 ft / 44 m

Map
- Interactive map of Southern Cross Airport

Runways
Direction	Length		Surface
Direction	ft	m	Surface
09/27	2,400	732	Turf

Statistics (2010)
- Aircraft operations: 425
- Based aircraft: 14
- Source: Federal Aviation Administration

Southern Cross Airport (FAA LID: C01) is a public-use airport located 3 nmi (5.6 km) southwest of the central business district of the Williamstown section of Monroe Township, Gloucester County, New Jersey, United States. It is privately owned.
