= CDS =

CDS, CDs, Cds, etc. may refer to:

== Finance ==
- Canadian Depository for Securities, Canadian post-trade financial services company
- Certificate of deposit (CDs)
- Counterfeit Deterrence System, developed by the Central Bank Counterfeit Deterrence Group
- Credit default swap (CDS), a type of credit derivative

== Military ==
- Chief Defence Scientist, the head of the Australian Defence Science & Technology
- Chief of the Defence Staff (disambiguation)
  - Chief of the Defence Staff (Canada)
  - Chief of the Defence Staff (France)
  - Chief of the Defence Staff (Ghana)
  - Chief of the Defence Staff (India)
  - Chief of the Defence Staff (Nigeria)
  - Chief of the Defence Staff, of the Republic of Sierra Leone Armed Forces
  - Chief of the Defence Staff (Sri Lanka)
  - Chief of the Defence Staff (United Kingdom)
- Comprehensive Display System, a command, control, and coordination system used by the British Royal Navy in the 1960s to track aircraft
- South American Defense Council (Consejo de Defensa Sudamericano), of the Union of South American Nations

== Organizations ==
- Canadian Depository for Securities
- Center for Development and Strategy
- Centre de données astronomiques de Strasbourg, a French astronomical data center
- Centre for Development Studies, in India
- Century Data Systems, a defunct American computer data storage company
- Commercial Data Systems, a Canadian software publisher
- Conference of Drama Schools, now part of Drama UK
- Cooperative Development Services, a non-profit organization engaged in cooperative development in the US
- Sinaloa Cartel (Spanish: Cártel de Sinaloa)

=== Politics ===
- Campaign for Democratic Socialism, a former group within the British Labour Party; forerunner to the Social Democratic Party
- Centre des démocrates sociaux (Centre of Social Democrats), a French political party; see
- CDS – People's Party (Centro Democrático e Social – Partido Popular), a Portuguese political party
- Centro Democrático y Social (Democratic and Social Centre), a former Spanish political party
- Convention démocratique et sociale-Rahama (Democratic and Social Convention), a political party in Niger

== Science ==
- Cadmium sulfide (CdS), an inorganic compound
- Climate Data Store, a central component of the Copernicus Climate Change Service (C3S)
- Chromatography data system, software collecting and analyzing chromatographic results
- Coding DNA sequence, that portion of a gene's DNA or RNA, composed of exons, that codes for protein
- Correlated double sampling, a method to measure electrical values such as voltages or currents that allows removing an undesired offset
- Chlorine Dioxide Solution, a toxic solution of sodium chlorite, falsely promoted as a universal cure
- Cytosolic DNA Sensor, molecule that detects microbial double-stranded DNA in the cytosol and activates signaling pathways that initiate anti-microbial responses

== Technology ==
- Current Directory Structure, an important internal data structure in DOS
- Compact discs (CDs)
- CD single (CDS), a music single in the form of a standard size compact disc
- Cockpit display system
- Cross-domain solution, processes that transfer data between security domains
- Cinema Digital Sound, a multi-channel surround sound format used for theatrical films in the early 1990s

== Other uses ==
- Common Data Set
- Community day school, a school system used in the state of California, US
- Coulsdon South railway station, London, England (National Rail station code)
- Country Day School movement
- Child-directed speech, or baby talk
- Condensed distillers solubles, also referred to as distillers grains, a cereal byproduct of the distillation process
- Container delivery system, a system used for airdrops
- Controlled/dangerous substance, as defined by the Controlled Substances Act
- Combined Defence Services Examination, abbreviated as CDS, Indian military examination
- Certified Director of Safety (Designation from NATMI - the North American Transportation Management Institute in conjunction with the University of Central Florida)
- Customs Declaration Service, a UK customs management system and planned successor of CHIEF.
- Cognitive disengagement syndrome, an attention disorder that is increasingly thought to be distinct from ADHD

== See also ==
- Clinical decision support (CDSS), software to assist clinical diagnostic and therapeutic decision-making
- CD (disambiguation), for the singular of CDS
