= CD (disambiguation) =

CD, or compact disc, is a thin plastic silvery disc for audio recordings.

CD or cd may also refer to:

== Science and technology ==
=== Astronomy and cosmology ===
- Cordoba Durchmusterung, a star catalog of the southern sky
- Cosmological decade or CÐ, a unit of time
- Type-cD galaxy, a galaxy morphology classification

=== Biology, ecology, and medicine ===
- Coeliac disease, long term autoimmune disorder causing intolerance to gluten
- Conduct disorder, a psychological disorder
- Conservation Dependent or LR/cd, an IUCN category
- Cluster of differentiation, a protocol used for the identification of cell surface molecules on white blood cells
- Crohn's disease
- Chlordane
- Communicable disease

=== Computing ===
- CD-ROM, compact disc technology applied for use in computer data
- cd (command), a shell command to change the current working directory
- Continuous delivery, a software development design practice
- Continuous deployment, a software development design practice
- Collision detection, CSMA/CD
- .cd, the Internet domain of the Democratic Republic of the Congo
- Sega CD, also known as the Sega Mega-CD, a CD-ROM accessory and format for the Sega Genesis produced by Sega as part of the fourth generation of video game consoles

=== Mathematics ===
- cd (elliptic function), one of Jacobi's elliptic functions
- 400 (number), written CD in Roman numerals
  - AD 400 (CD), a year of the Common Era
- 205 (number), written CD in hexadecimal

=== Other uses in science and technology ===
- Cadmium, symbol Cd, a chemical element
- Candela or cd, a unit of light intensity
- -CD, the North American call sign suffix for Class A low-power television stations operating with digital signals
- Circular dichroism, a form of spectroscopy
- Critical Dimension, the minimum feature size that a projection system can print in photolithography
- Drag coefficient or c_{d}, a dimensionless quantity used to quantify the drag of an object in a fluid
- Cluster decay, a rare mode of nuclear decay

== Government, military, and political ==
- Commander of the Order of Distinction, a rank in the Jamaican Orders of Societies of Honour
- Canadian Forces' Decoration, by post-nominal letters
- Centre Democrats (Denmark), a Danish former political party
- Centre Democrats (Netherlands), a former political party of the Netherlands
- Centro Democratico, a political party in Italy
- Christian democracy, a political ideology
- Citizen's dividend, proposed policy based upon the Georgist principle that the natural world is the common property of all people
- Civil defense, an effort to protect the citizens of a state from military attack and natural disasters
- Community of Democracies, an intergovernmental organization of democracies and democratizing countries
- Conference on Disarmament, an international forum that negotiates multilateral arms control and disarmament agreements
- Corps Diplomatique, the collective body of foreign diplomats accredited to a particular country or body
- FBI Counterintelligence Division, the United States Federal Bureau of Investigation's division responsible for investigating espionage

== Places ==
- Central District, Seattle, a district in Seattle
- Democratic Republic of the Congo, by ISO 3166-1 alpha-2 country code
- cd., abbreviation for caddesi, street, in Turkish

== Transport ==
- ČD, short for České dráhy (lit. 'Czech Railways'), the main train company in the Czech Republic
- Chandrapur railway station (Station code: CD), Maharashtra, India
- Corendon Dutch Airlines (IATA code)
- Geely CD, a coupe automobile made by Geely Automobile
- Bitter CD, a luxury hatchback coupé

== Arts and entertainment ==
- C.D (Criminal or Devil), a 2024 Indian psychological thriller film
- "CD", a song by T2 (band)
- Sonic CD, a 1993 platform game developed and published by Sega for the Sega CD

== Other uses ==
- cd, for cord (unit) of volume of wood
- Cairo Damascus or Damascus Document, a text found among the Dead Sea Scrolls
- Committee Draft, a status in the International Organization for Standardization
- Companion dog (title), a title offered to dogs by the American Kennel Club for dog obedience
- Cross-dressing, the act of wearing clothing associated with the opposite sex
- Cúcuta Deportivo, a Colombian football club
- Certificate of deposit, in the United States, a bank-issued financial instrument that matures on a fixed date but typically has higher interest than a savings account

== See also ==
- CDS (disambiguation)
- CeeDee (disambiguation)
- C&D (disambiguation)
- BCD (disambiguation)
- CDE (disambiguation)
