= BCD =

BCD may refer to:

== Computing ==
- Binary-coded decimal, a representation of decimal digits in binary
  - BCD (character encoding), a 6-bit superset of binary-coded decimal derived from the binary encoding of the same name
- Boot Configuration Data, the configuration data required to boot Microsoft Windows Vista and later
- Bipolar-CMOS-DMOS, a type of BiCMOS semiconductor technology

== Organisations ==
- Banque de commerce et de développement, a defunct bank in Burundi
- Basnahira Cricket Dundee, a Sri Lankan cricket team
- BCD Tofu House, a Los Angeles-based Korean restaurant chain
- BCD Travel, a provider of global corporate travel management
- Belarusian Christian Democracy, a Christian-democratic political party in Belarus.
- Berkshire Country Day School, an independent school in Lenox, Massachusetts, US
- Bid Closing Date The closing date for a bid is a specific date (and usually a specific time) when the bid is closed to the public for bid submissions. At this point, only the submitted proposals will be considered eligible.
- The British Columbia Dragoons, a Canadian Forces armoured regiment
- Battlefield Coordination Detachment, is the senior United States Army liaison element of the Army Air Ground System.

== Places ==
- Bacolod–Silay International Airport (IATA code), Silay City, Philippines
- Beirut Central District, Beirut, Lebanon

== Other uses ==
- Bad conduct discharge, a form of discharge from US military service, sometimes referred to colloquially as a "big chicken dinner".
- Barrels per calendar day, a unit for measuring output of oil refineries
- Blue compact dwarf galaxy, a small galaxy which contains large clusters of young, hot, massive stars
- Board-certified diplomate, in the list of credentials in psychology
- Buoyancy control device, in scuba diving
- Bolt circle diameter, for example, of a crankset, of a bicycle disc brake, or in wheel sizing
- "Behind closed doors", a marketing term for previewing a product to a select audience

== See also ==
- BCD in the sugar baby/sugar daddy (SBSD) community means Behind Closed Doors.
- BCDS (disambiguation)
