= 2CD =

2CD may refer to:

- 2CD, a type of double album consisting of two compact discs
- 2C-D, a pharmaceutical chemical compound

== See also ==
- CD (disambiguation)
- CD2, cell adhesion molecule
