= CND (disambiguation) =

CND is the Campaign for Nuclear Disarmament in the United Kingdom.

CND may also refer to:

== Transportation ==
- Aero Continente Dominicana, former Dominican Republic airline, ICAO airline code
- Mihail Kogălniceanu International Airport, Northern Dobruja, Romania, IATA airport code
- Chandur railway station (station code: CND), in Chandur, Maharashtra, India

== Organizations ==
- Centre National de la Danse (National Dance Centre), France
- Congregation of Notre Dame of Montreal, a Catholic women's community
- Spanish National Dance Company (Compañía Nacional de Danza)
- United Nations Commission on Narcotic Drugs

== Science and technology ==
- US military computer network defense in computer network operations

== See also ==
- C&D (disambiguation)
- CD (disambiguation)
