= Geely HQ =

Car from Geely Automobile, 1998 to 2006

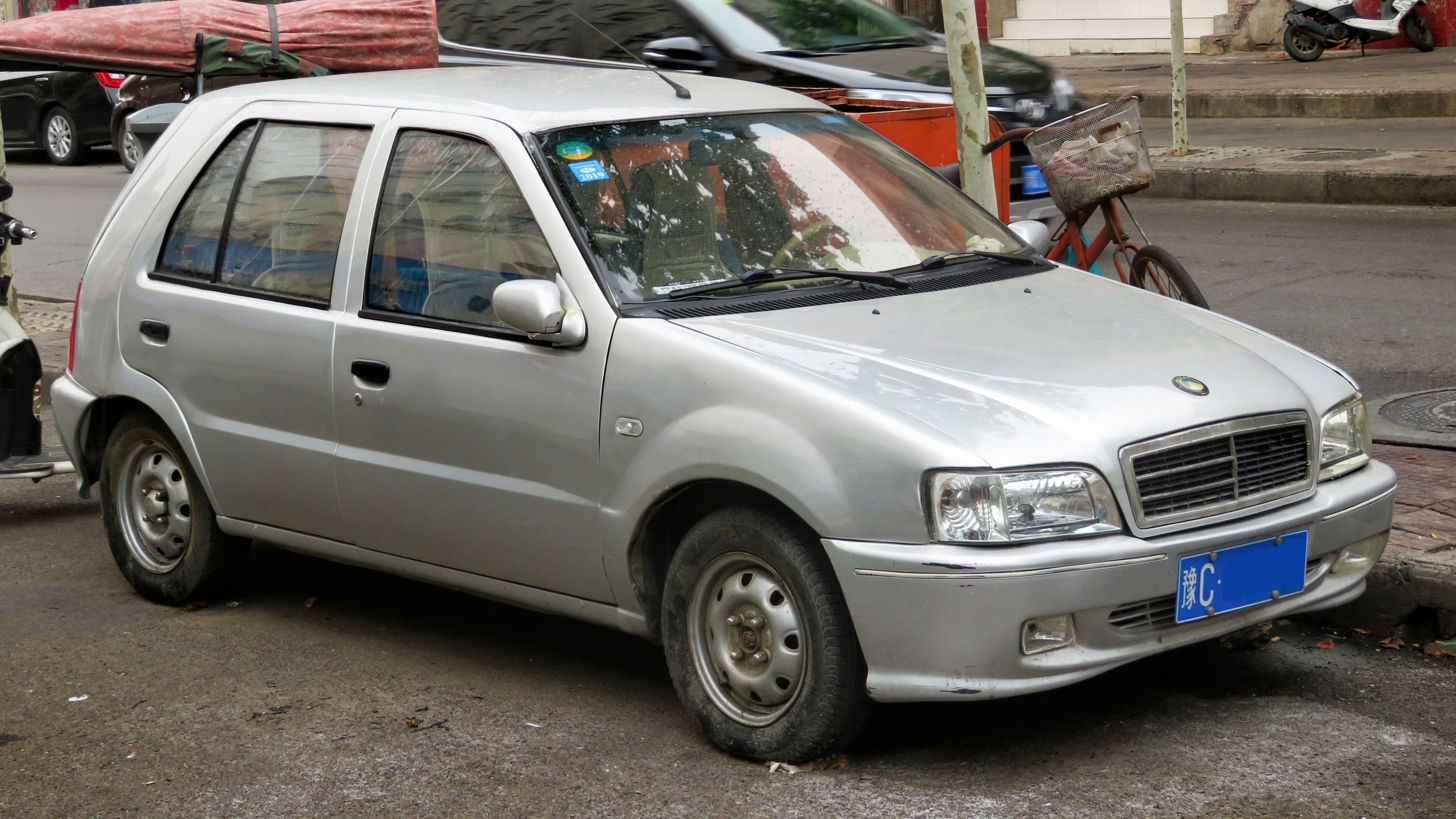

Overview
- Manufacturer: Geely Automobile
- Also called: Geely HS (Russia); Geely Liangjing JL6360E1 (hatchback); Geely Pride HQ7130B1U/SRV
- Production: 1998–2006

Body and chassis
- Class: subcompact car
- Body style: 5-door hatchback 5 door station wagon
- Related: Xiali TJ; Daihatsu Charade; Geely MR; Geely PU

Powertrain
- Engine: 1.0 L JL376QE I3; 1.3 L MR479Q I4; 1.5 L MR479A I4
- Transmission: 5 speed manual 4 speed manual

Dimensions
- Wheelbase: 2,340 mm (92.1 in)
- Length: 3,900 mm (153.5 in); 3,650 mm (143.7 in) (hatchback)
- Width: 1,650 mm (65.0 in); 1,635 mm (64.4 in) (hatchback)
- Height: 1,420 mm (55.9 in); 1,410 mm (55.5 in) (hatchback)
- Curb weight: 930 kg (2,050 lb)

The Geely HQ ("Haoqing" (豪情)) is a subcompact car produced by Chinese manufacturer Geely Automobile from 1998 to 2006.

== Overview ==
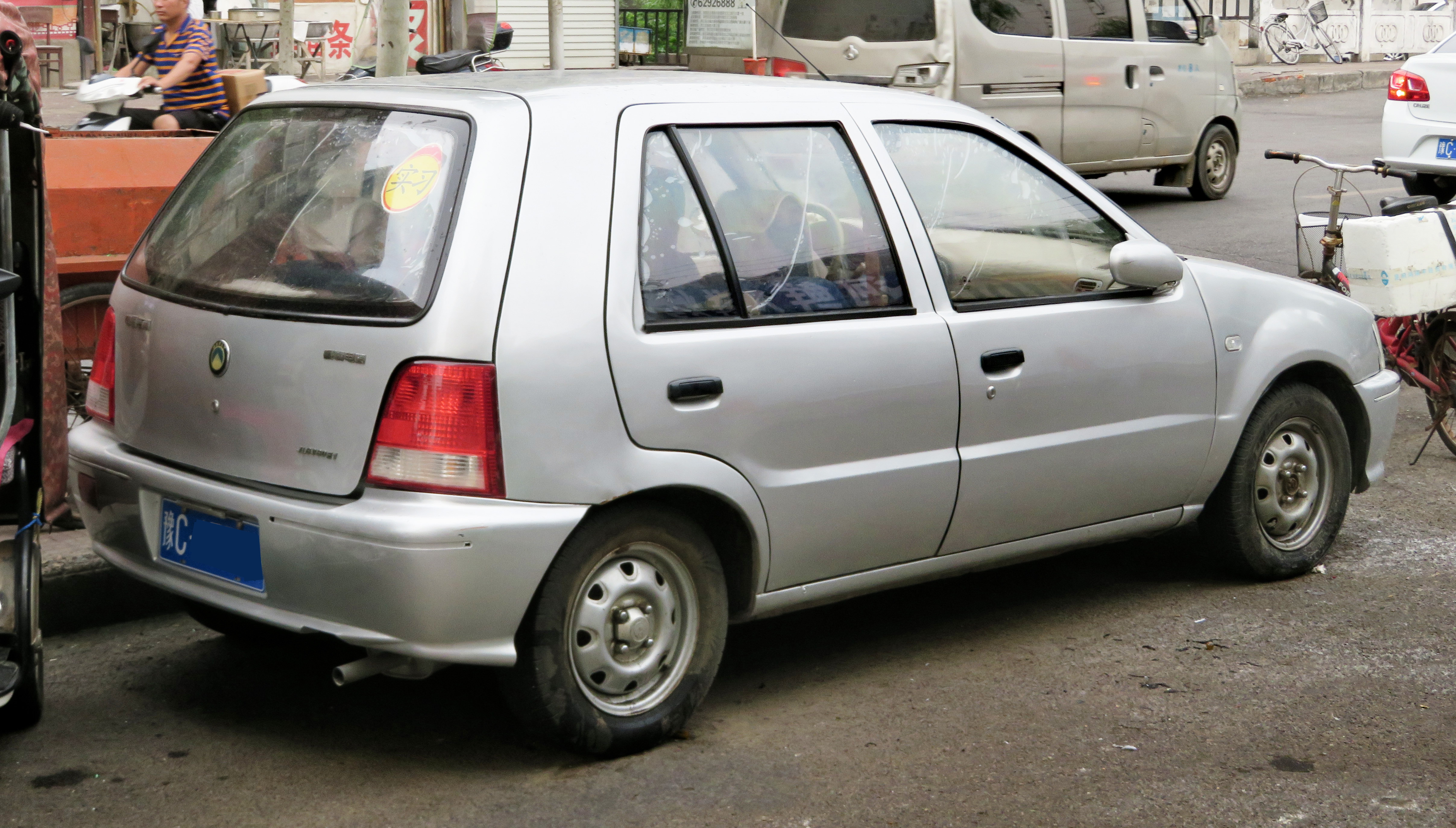
2003 Geely Haoqing (HQ) JL6360E1, rear quarter view

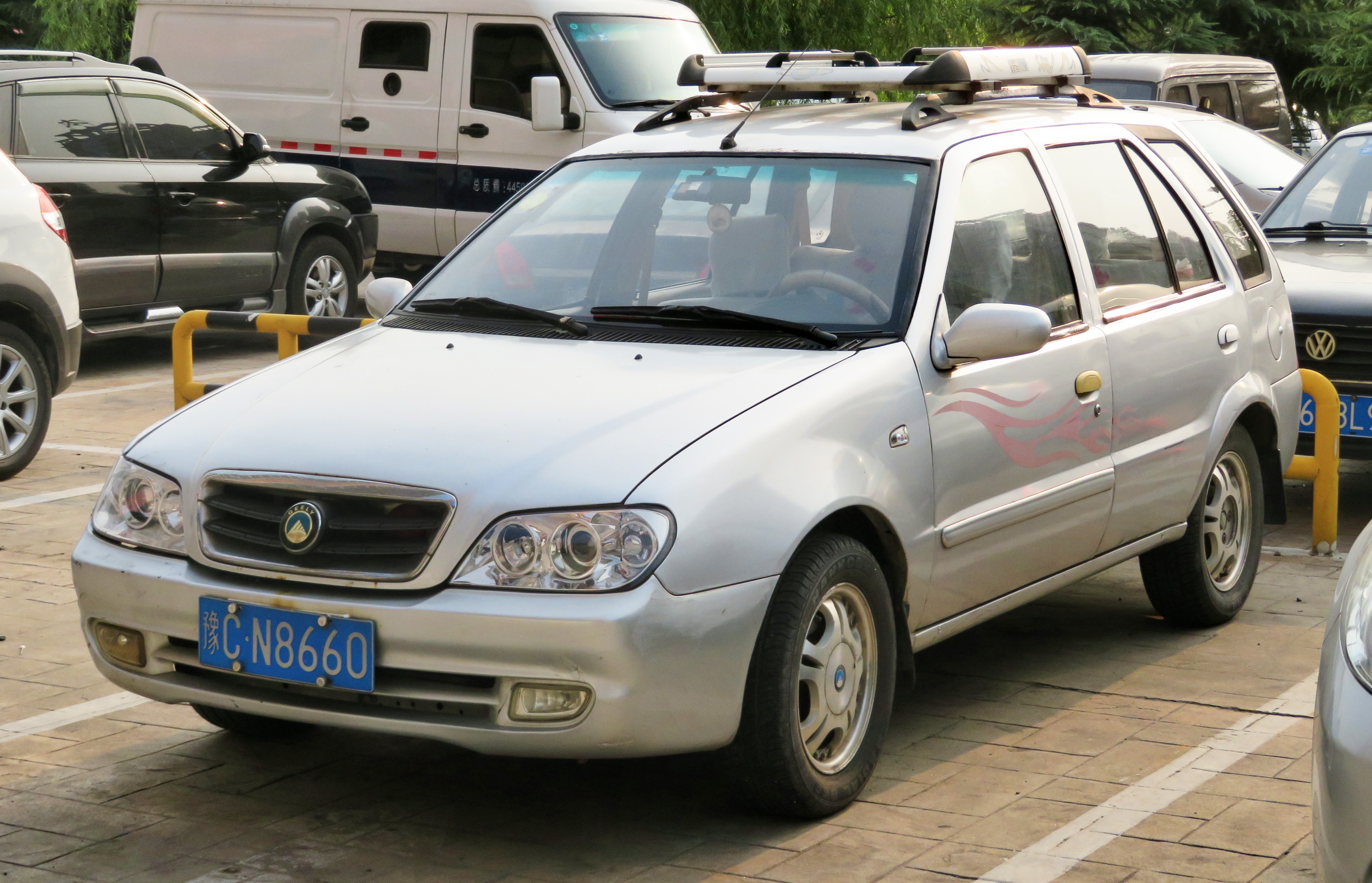
2004 Geely Haoqing (HQ) S-RV HQ7130B1 1.3L, front

The Geely HQ or Haoqing was the first Geely product, introduced in February 1998 as a hatchback. Originally a 993 cc Daihatsu three cylinder or a 1,342 cc Toyota inline four were offered, with 52 PS (38 kW) or 86 PS (63 kW) respectively. A special edition 5-door hatchback is also available known as the "Liangjing" as well as station wagon models known as the Geely Pride HQ7130B1U and Geely Pride S-RV. The HQ7130BU was sold from 2002 to 2007, while the S-RV was sold from 2002 to 2005.

The HQ is based on the G100 Daihatsu Charade platform, which Geely licensed from FAW Tianjin. Its basic underpinnings are shared with the Merrie/Uliou and Rural/Urban Nanny.

The HQ was given an update in 2003 and was shown at the Frankfurt Motor Show in 2005 along with the Geely MR, Geely CK, Geely CD and the Maple Marindo.

Production ended in 2006.
