= BCDS =

BCDS may refer to:

- Beaver Country Day School, a private independent school in Chestnut Hill, Massachusetts, US
- Buckley Country Day School, a private independent school in Roslyn, New York, US

== See also ==
- BCD (disambiguation)
