= CeeDee (disambiguation) =

CeeDee most commonly refers to CeeDee Lamb, an American football player.

CeeDee may also refer to:

- CeeDee Candy, repackager for Candy Buttons
- CeeDee Music UK, management for record label Angel Air
- Ceedee, alternative name for Älpee album by Klamydia
- The CeeDees, music group whose album was produced by Steve Webster

== See also ==
- The Cactus Cee/D album by 3rd Bass
- CD (disambiguation)
