= Geely PU =

Overview
- Manufacturer: Geely Automobile
- Also called: Geely JL1010N (2001–2005); Geely JL5010X panel van (2001–2004); Geely JL1010E1 (2005–2007)
- Production: 2001–2007

Body and chassis
- Class: Small sedan delivery/coupe utility
- Body style: 2-door van/pickup
- Related: Xiali TJ7300; Daihatsu Charade; Geely HQ; Geely MR

Powertrain
- Engine: 1.0 L JL376QE I4; 1.3 L JL479Q I4
- Transmission: 5 speed manual

Dimensions
- Wheelbase: 2,370 mm (93.3 in)
- Length: 3,965 mm (156.1 in)
- Width: 1,640 mm (64.6 in)
- Height: 1,434 mm (56.5 in) (Rural Nanny); 1,635 mm (64.4 in) (Urban Nanny)
- Curb weight: 940 kg (2,072 lb)

The Geely PU was a subcompact vehicle produced by Chinese manufacturer Geely Automobile from 2001 to 2007. The vehicle was nicknamed as 'Urban Nanny' or 'Rural Nanny'.

It was introduced in 2001, available as a two-door coupe utility called the JL1010N sold from 2001 to 2005 then as the JL1010E1 from 2005 to 2007 as well as the two-door van known as the JL5010X from 2001 to 2004.

The PU is based on the Daihatsu Charade platform, which Geely licensed from Xiali. Its basic underpinnings are shared with the HQ/Haoqing and Merrie/Uliou.
