= C&D =

C&D or C and D or variation, may refer to:

- Cease and desist, an order to stop an activity
- C&D (Créativité et Développement), French-Japanese animation firm started by Jean Chalopin, DIC Entertainment's founder
- C&D Aerospace, part of the French corporation Zodiac Aerospace
- C&D Canal, a ship canal connecting the Delaware River with Chesapeake Bay in the United States
- C&D International Plaza, the tallest building in Xiamen, China as of 2013
- C&D waste, waste from construction and demolition, also known as SMC
- Car and Driver, a U.S. automotive magazine
- C and D -class destroyer, British Royal Navy interwar destroyers
- Construction and demolition
- C&D, a company founded in 1984, also called Calvin & Daniel
- Campbell & Dean, a former property letting agent based in Falkirk, Scotland, bought by Countrywide and folded into the "Slater Hogg & Howison" brand

== See also ==
- C and D Canal, USA
- CND (disambiguation)
- CD (disambiguation)
- C (disambiguation)
- D (disambiguation)
- D&C (disambiguation)
