= Geely MR =

Geely Merrie
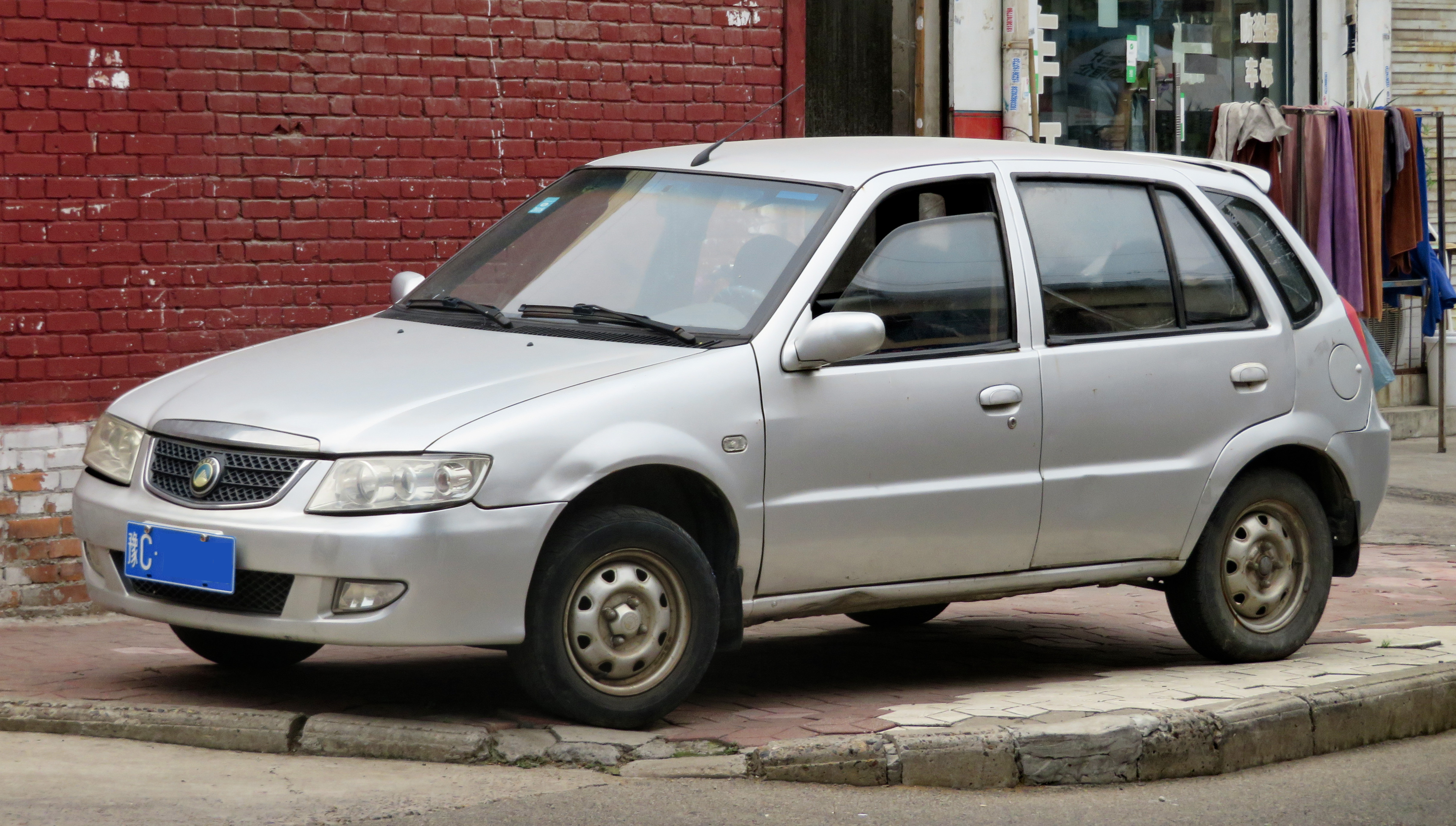

Overview
- Manufacturer: Geely Automobile
- Production: 2003 – 2006

Body and chassis
- Class: Subcompact car
- Body style: 5-door notchback
- Related: Xiali TJ7300; Daihatsu Charade; Geely HQ; Geely PU

Powertrain
- Engine: 1.3 L MR479Q I4; 1.5 L MR479QA I4
- Transmission: 5 speed manual

Dimensions
- Wheelbase: 2,340 mm (92.1 in)
- Length: 3,825 mm (150.6 in)
- Width: 1,670 mm (65.7 in)
- Height: 1,386 mm (54.6 in)
- Curb weight: approx. 900 kg (1,984 lb)

The Geely Merrie is a subcompact car produced by Chinese automaker Geely Automobile from 2003 to 2006. The MR is produced in five-door hatchback (Merrie / 美日) and four-door sedan (Uliou / 优利欧) body styles.

== Overview ==
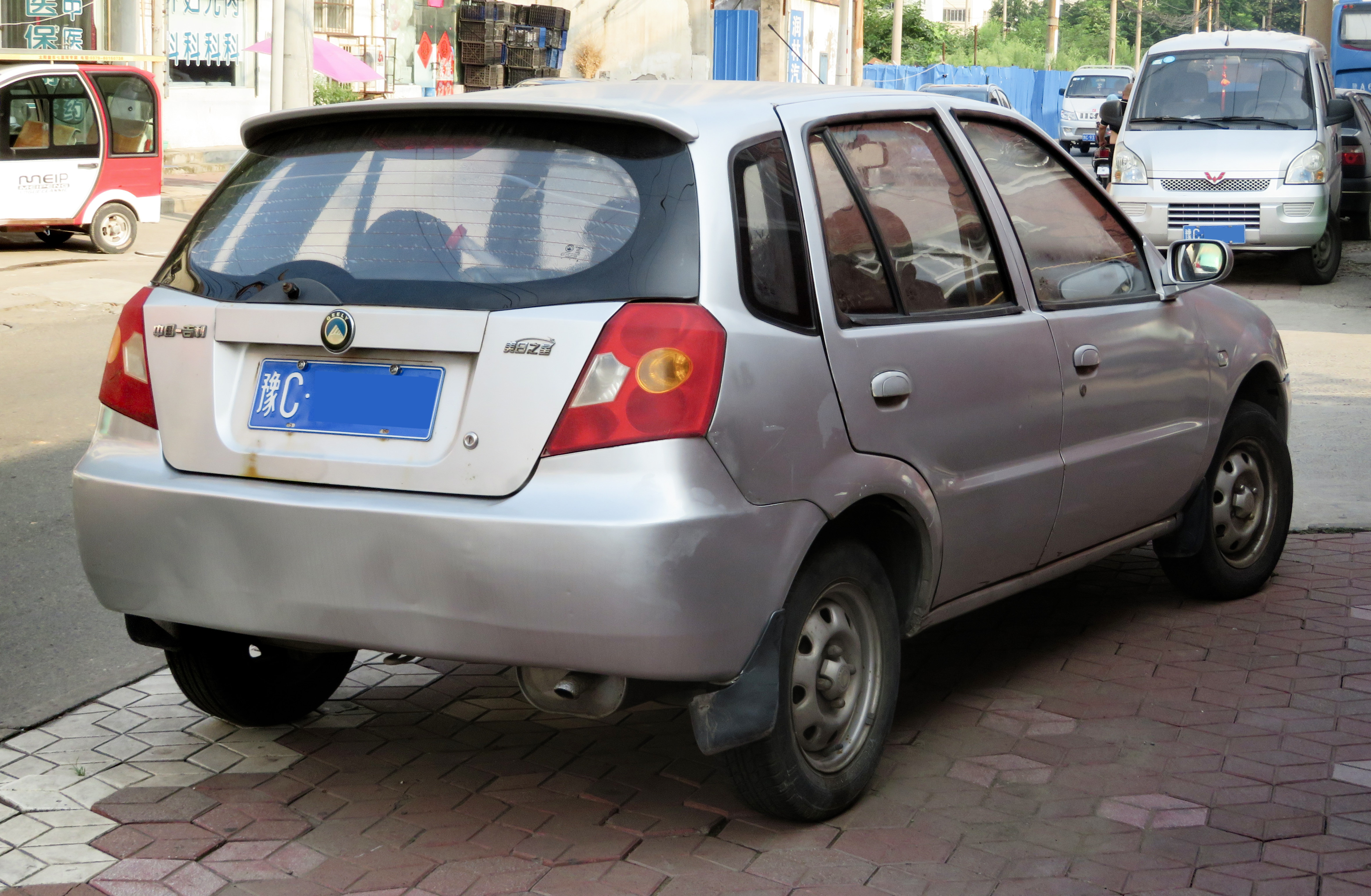
2004 Geely Merrie (Meiri-Zhixing), rear quarter view

The MR is based on the Daihatsu Charade platform, which Geely licensed from Xiali. Its base underpinnings are also shared with the HQ/Haoqing and Rural/Urban Nanny.

The MR was shown at the 2005 Frankfurt Motor Show along with four other Geely models.

The Merrie is a five-door hatchback that looks like a sedan due to a short protruding trunk. It was introduced in 2003 and updated as the Merrie MR 203 at the 2005 Shanghai Motor Show. The MR 203 received the same styling changes as the previous years MR 303 sedan, but unlike the sedan the hatchback is only available with the 1.5-litre engine, hence its official model code of JL 7150 X6.

Production for the Merrie ended in 2006.

== Geely Uliou (MR 303) ==
Geely MR 303
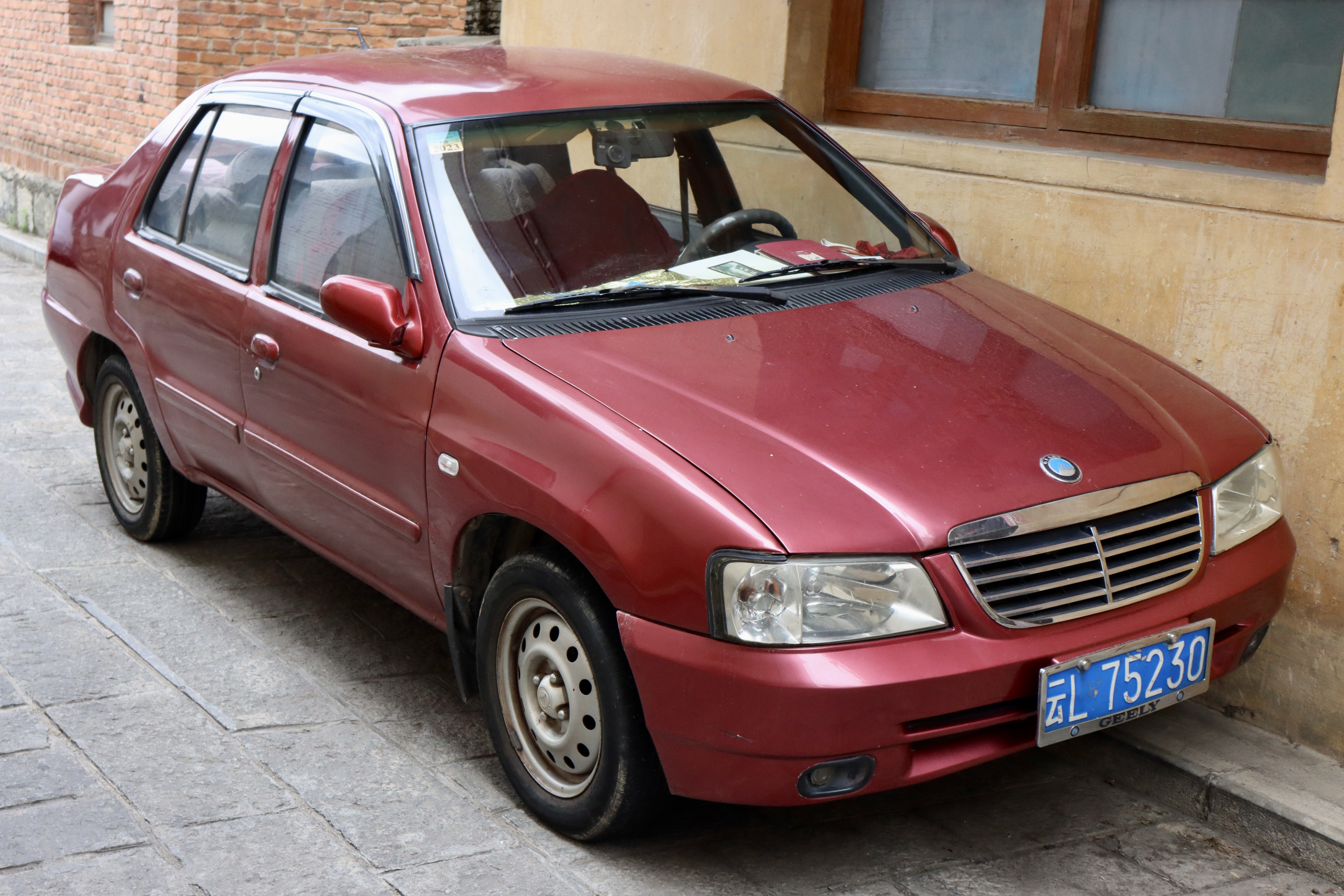

Overview
- Manufacturer: Geely Automobile
- Also called: Geely Uliou (2003–2004)
- Production: 2003 – 2005

Body and chassis
- Class: Subcompact car
- Body style: 4-door sedan
- Related: Xiali TJ7300; Daihatsu Charade; Geely HQ; Geely PU

Powertrain
- Engine: 1.3 L MR479Q I4; 1.5 L MR479QA I4
- Transmission: 5 speed manual

Dimensions
- Wheelbase: 2,440 mm (96.1 in)
- Length: 4,150 mm (163.4 in)
- Width: 1,620 mm (63.8 in)
- Height: 1,450 mm (57.1 in)
- Curb weight: 880 kg (1,940 lb)-960 kg (2,116 lb)

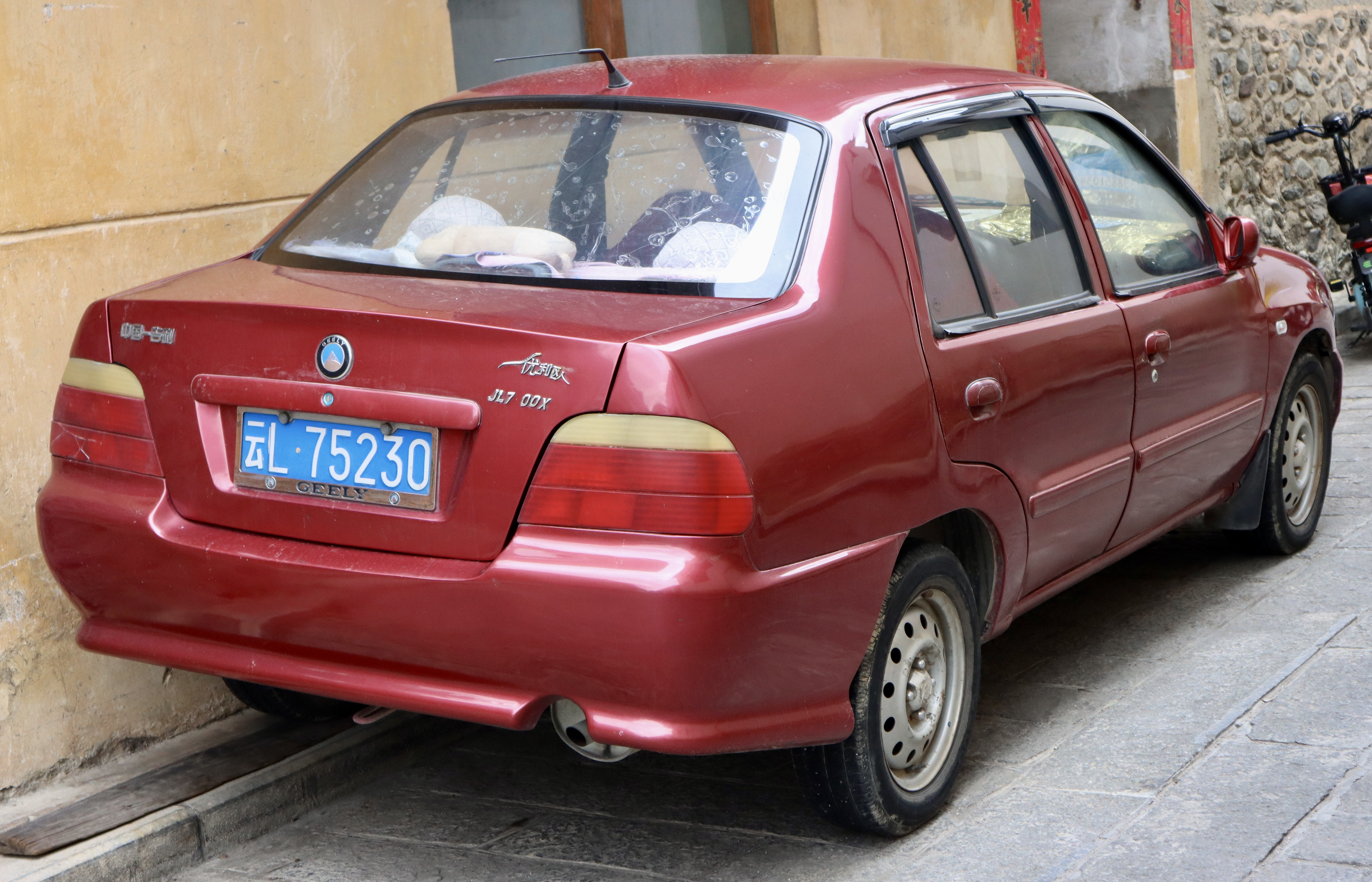
Geely MR sedan (Uliou / 优利欧), rear quarter view

The Geely Uliou is a four-door sedan version of the MR introduced in 2003 as the MR 7130 (1.3-liter engine). The 1.5-litre MR 7150 was introduced, and the next year a restyled version was added. The new version was called the Merrie MR 303 (official model code was MR 7130 X3) and is only built with the smaller engine.

Production for the Uliou ended in 2005 with approximately 15,000 units.
