= CDE =

CDE may refer to:

== Education ==
- California Department of Education
- Career Development Event, a type of contest sponsored by the National FFA Organization
- Center for Data Engineering, IIIT Hyderabad
- Center for Distance Education at University of Alaska Fairbanks
- Certified diabetes educator
- Colorado Department of Education

== Technology and computing ==
- Cable discharge event, a discharge when connecting electrical cables to a device
- Cardholder Data Environment, part of the Payment Card Industry Data Security Standard for credit card handling
- Chrome Dev Editor, a Dart programming language development environment for Google Chrome
- Collaborative Development Environment, a software development methodology
- Common Data Environment, a digital resource used in building information modeling
- Common Desktop Environment, a graphical desktop environment for Unix and OpenVMS

== Other ==
- Carbon dioxide equivalent, a scale of measurement of the "greenhouse effect" of other atmospheric gases
- Cde., an abbreviation of comrade
- CDE, NYSE stock symbol for Coeur Mining
- Ciudad del Este, a city in Paraguay
- Comissões Democráticas Eleitorais, part of the former Portuguese Democratic Movement
- Comitetul Democrat Evreiesc, or Jewish Democratic Committee
- Commandement de l'Espace, the French military space command
- Concept development and experimentation, a technique for developing new ideas for military capabilities
- Chengde Puning Airport, IATA code CDE
- Chenchu language, ISO 639-3 code cde
