= Geely BL =

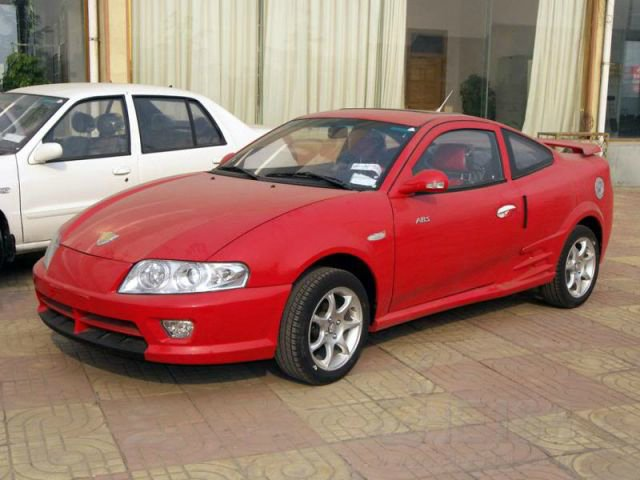

Overview
- Manufacturer: Geely Automobile
- Also called: Geely Beauty Leopard; Geely Mybo; Geely BO
- Production: 2003–2006
- Model years: 2004–2006

Body and chassis
- Class: Sports car (S)
- Body style: 2-door coupé
- Related: Geely CD

Powertrain
- Engine: 1.3 L MR479Q I4; 1.5 L MR479QA I4; 1.8 L JL481Q I4
- Transmission: 5-speed manual 4-speed automatic

Dimensions
- Wheelbase: 2,440 mm (96.1 in)
- Length: 4,110 mm (161.8 in)
- Width: 1,690 mm (66.5 in)
- Height: 1,325 mm (52.2 in)
- Curb weight: 980 kg (2,161 lb)

Chronology
- Successor: Geely CD

The Geely BL (Beauty Leopard) is a sports coupe produced by Chinese manufacturer Geely Automobile from 2003 to 2006.

== Overview ==
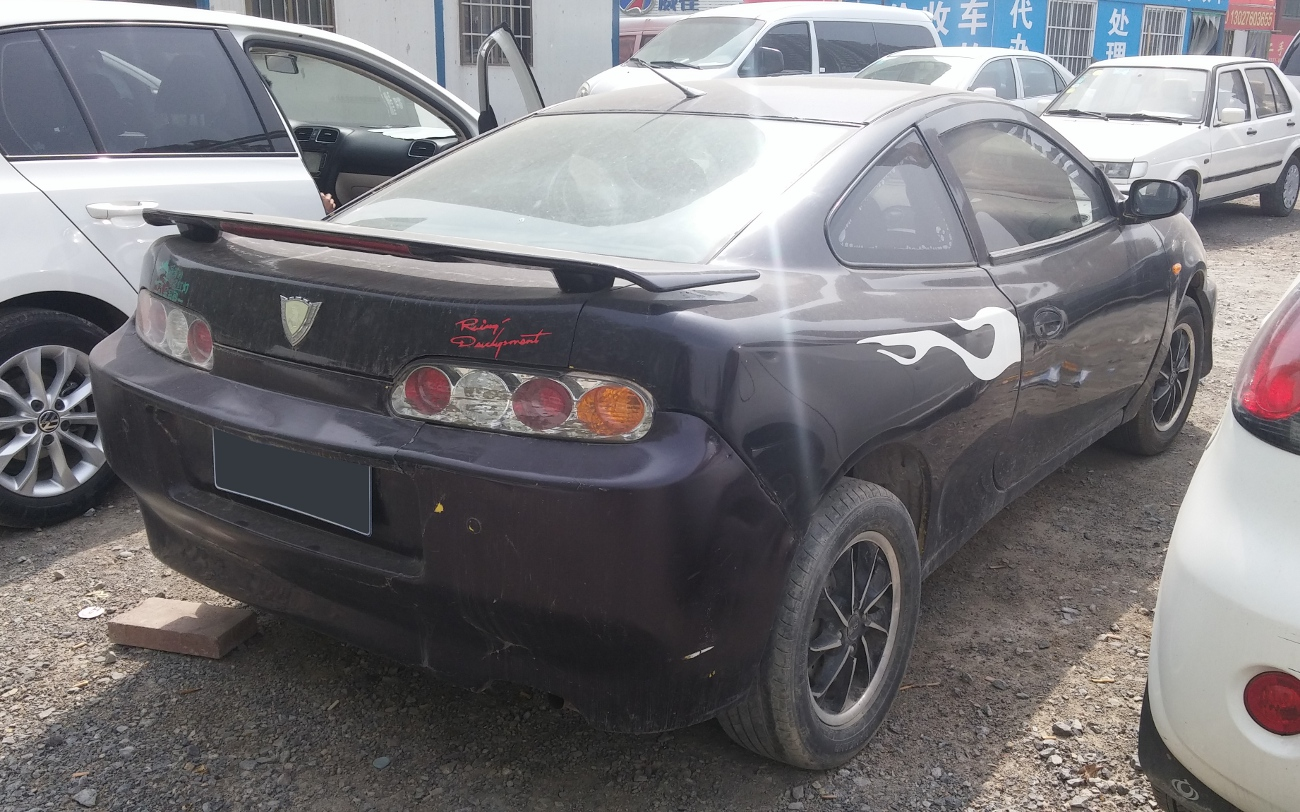
Geely BL rear

The "BL" name stands for "Beauty Leopard" which is the direct meaning of the Chinese name Meirenbao (美人豹, literally Beautiful [person] Leopard). The car was designed with help from Daewoo and was introduced to production in January, 2003. It is best known outside China for being the first vehicle with an in-car karaoke machine. The car's design seems to be inspired mostly by the Toyota Celica, with the headlights taking inspiration from the Honda Integra and the rear from the Toyota Supra.

The Geely BL is considered a sports car in China, and it has a top speed of 180 km/h (approx 111 mph).

The Geely BL is powered by a 1.3 L engine which is a Toyota Motor Corporation design, produced by Xiali. Later in 2006, a version with the JL481Q 1.8 liter engine also used by the Maple Hysoul with a top speed of 190km/h was produced.

Production of the Geely BL ended in 2006.
