= Berkshire Country Day School =

Coordinates: 42.301°N 73.3343°W

- Stockbridge, MA; USA

Information
- Type: Independent
- Motto: Berkshire Country Day School exists to inspire the individual promise of every student so that each may become an engaged citizen of the world.
- Founded: 1946
- Head of School: Mary Warner
- Faculty: 32
- Enrollment: 123
- Average class size: 7 students
- Campus: Rural (Brook Farm), 27 acres
- Colors: Blue and White
- Athletics: Interscholastic League, Club, Junior Varsity, and Varsity teams
- Sports: Soccer, Lacrosse, Cross Country Skiing,
- Mascot: Penguin
- Yearbook: The Penguin
- Website: www.berkshirecountryday.org mybcd.org

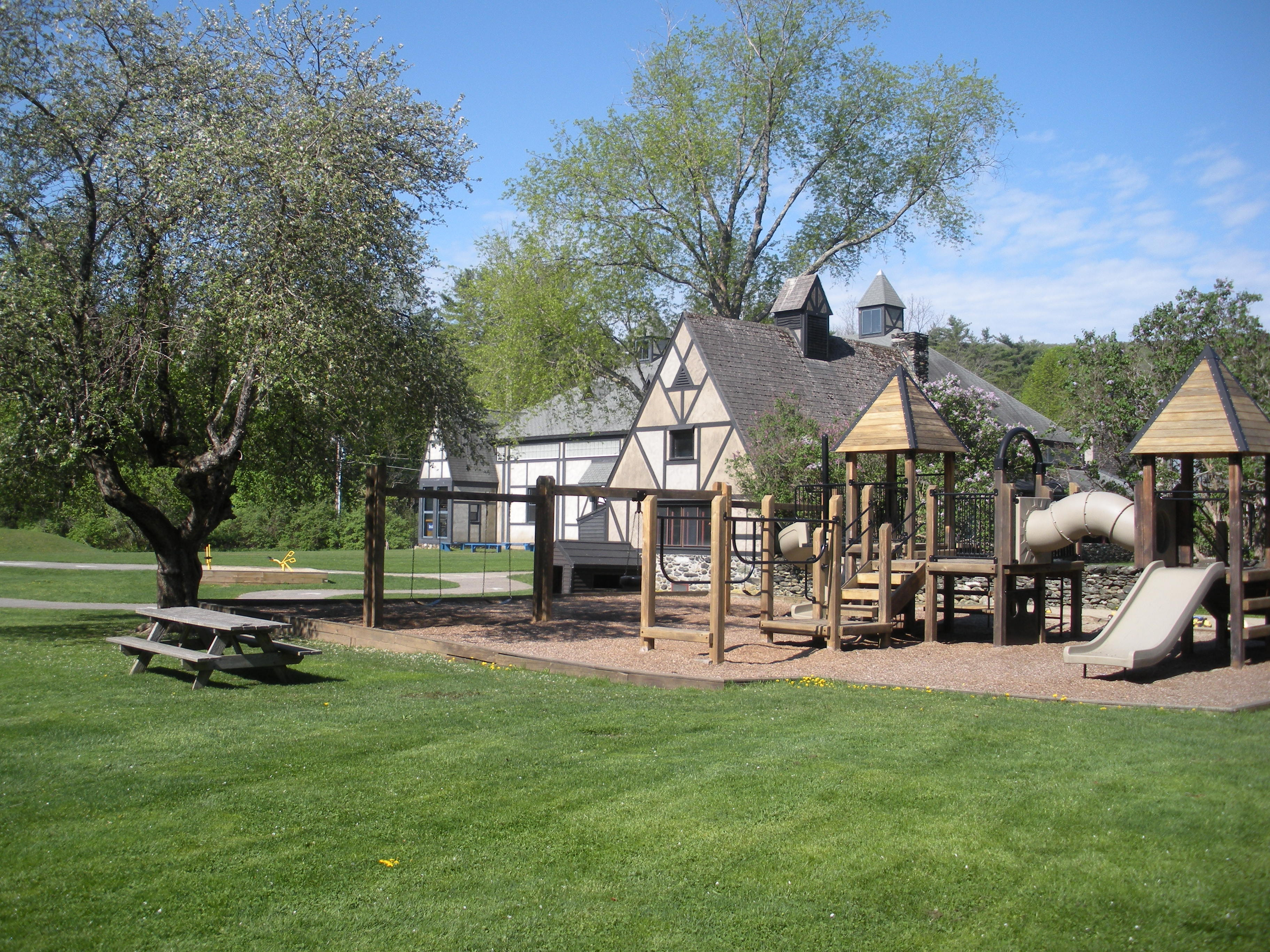
One of the playgrounds at the front of the school.

Berkshire Country Day (BCD) is an independent school for pre-schoolers through eighth grade. It is located at 55 Interlaken Road/Route 183 in Berkshire County, Massachusetts near the town of Lenox.

== History ==
BCD was founded in 1946 by a group of local parents who wanted to give their children a certain style of education which they felt was not available in the area. It began with 12 students in one building on the campus of the Lenox School for Boys, an Episcopal all-boys boarding school. Initially, the school covered only grades 1-6 and tuition ranged from only $150 to $310, depending on the grade. In 1957, the school expanded to include a seventh and eighth grade and kindergarten and preschool, and moved into two new buildings. The school's main building, housing the pre-k through sixth grade, was moved to the Starks' former family home on Walker Street in Lenox. The seventh and eighth grade, on the other hand, were housed in Bassett Hall, a building close by, which is now Kemble Inn. BCD's enrollment soared from 58 students in 1958 to 183 in 1963.

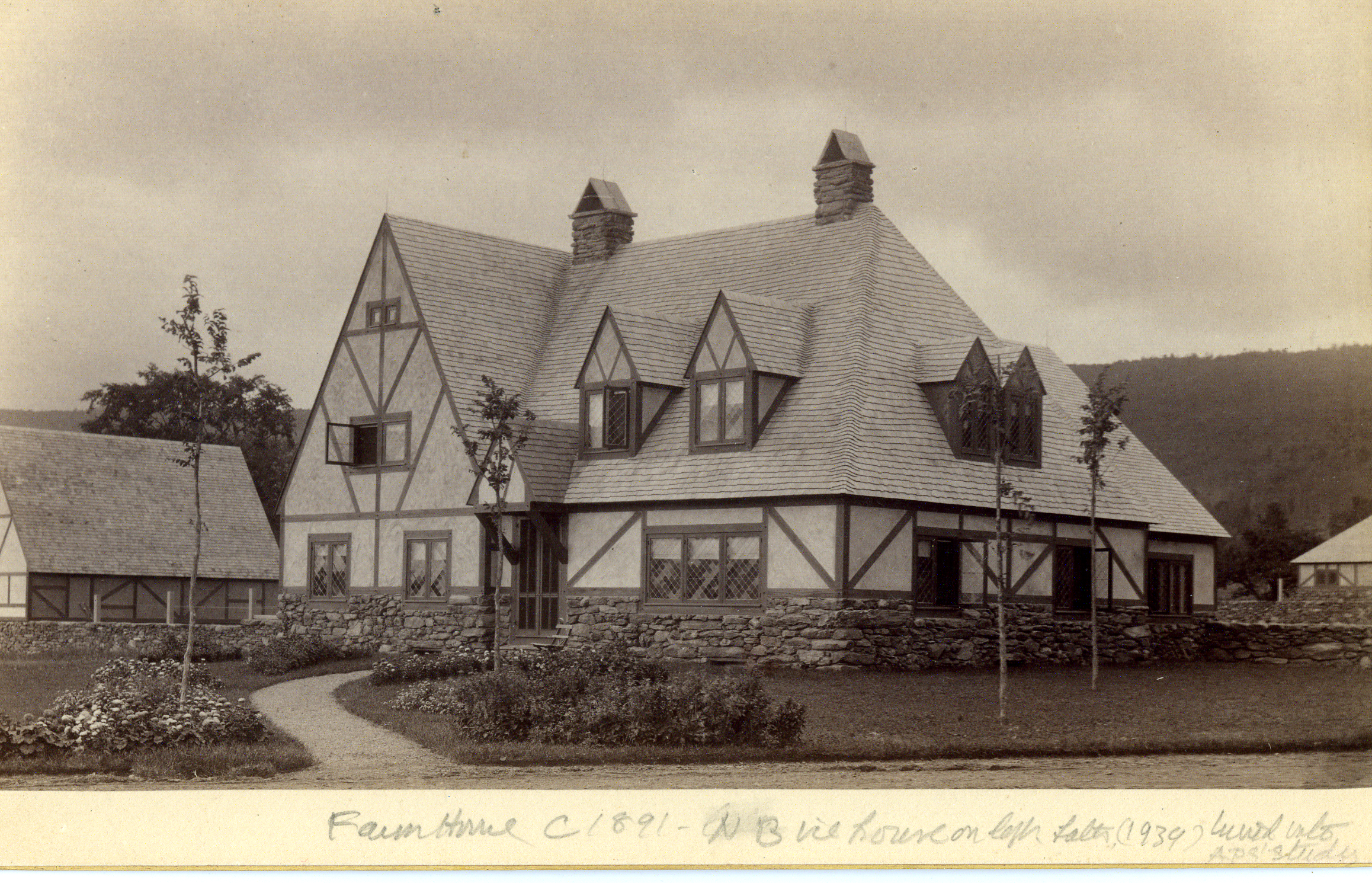
Brook Farm, circa 1891

Then, in 1963, the school purchased its current campus, the Brook Farm Campus. Initially, the campus was only used by the younger students for classes, while the older students continued using the Walker Street Building, frequenting the new campus for sports and co-curricular activities. This arrangement lasted for only a year, as the Walker Street building was destroyed in a fire. In the academic year 1967–68, the school expanded to include ninth grade. In 2000, the school opened Berkshire Country Day Secondary School (BCD2s), a high school division of the school consisting of grades 9–12. BCD's ninth grade was separated from BCD and became a part of BCD2s. The high school was located on Winthrop Campus, the summer home of the Boston University Tanglewood Institute, which the school rented from Boston University during the academic year. However, in June 2007 at the end of the academic year, BCD2s was closed, although the ninth grade class option was kept and added back to the BCD student body. Currently, the school resides at its Brook Farm campus, serving students from 2-years-old through eighth grade. BCD is still permitted by Boston University to use the West St. Theater for its upper school theater productions, talent show, and film festival. The 27-acre natural campus includes several regulation playing fields, a pond used for kayaking and ice skating and new wings have been added to the original historic buildings.

=== Brook Farm Campus ===
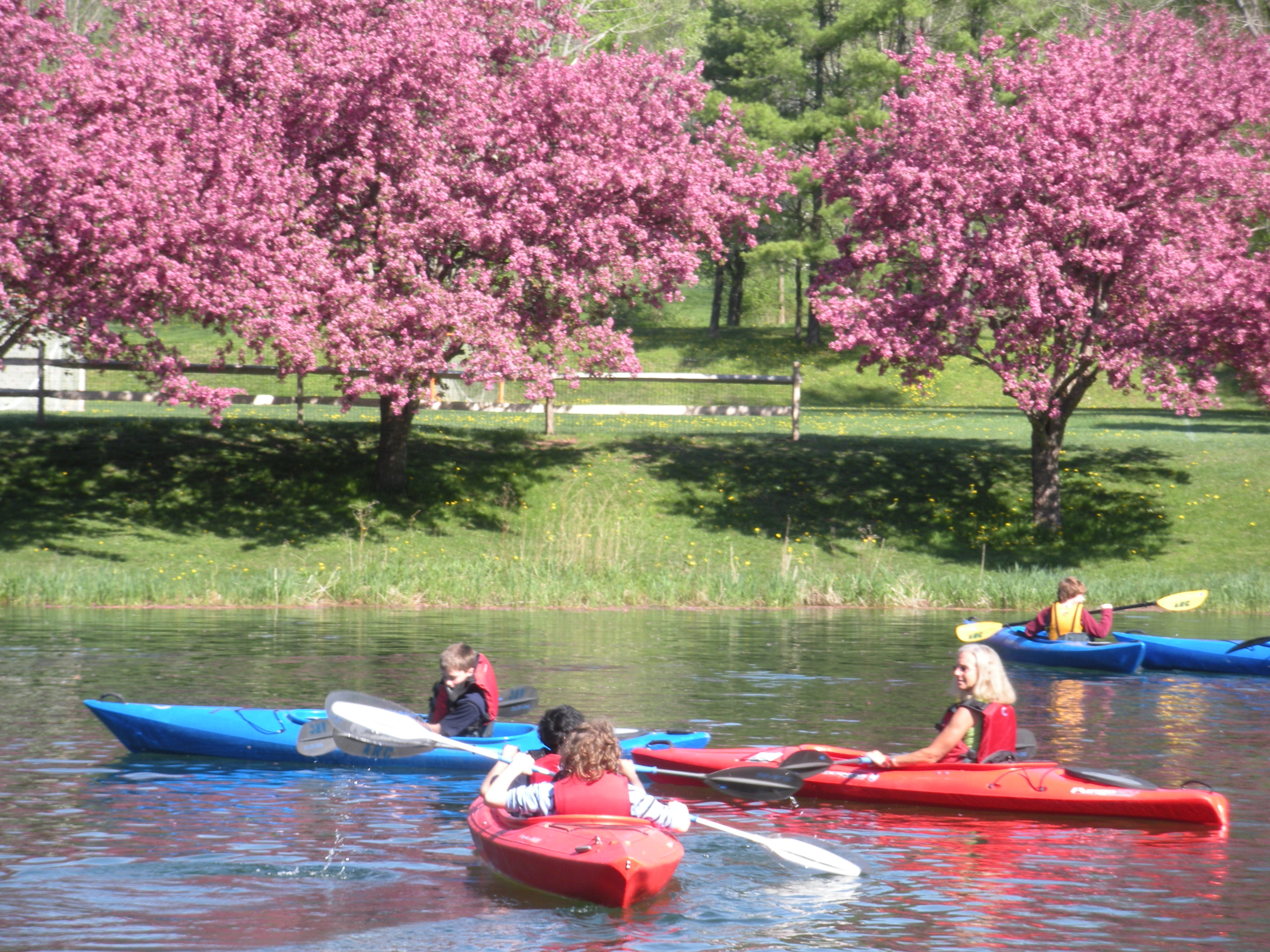
Kayaking on Barrett Pond

Berkshire Country Day School is located at the Brook Farm campus near Lenox, Massachusetts. The campus grounds date back to the 1890s and is listed on the National Register of Historic Places as it was once a working farm for the Anson Phelps Stokes' Shadowbrook estate. Mr. Stokes built the 1,000 acre estate, complete with a mansion that encompassed 100 rooms and stretched 410 feet, as a "summer cottage" in 1892–1896. After ten years (in 1906) the family sold the estate to Mr. Spencer Shotter. It was then leased to Mrs. Alfred Gwynne Vanderbilt in 1916 and 1917 before being sold to Mr. Andrew Carnegie. Mr. Carnegie inhabited the estate until 1919 when he passed. The New England Province of the Society of Jesus purchased the estate in 1922 and used it as their seminary. Unfortunately, in 1956 the entire Shadowbook mansion burned to the ground in a tragic fire. The Society rebuilt a new brick building on the site of the previous mansion and maintained it for their society until 1970. The estate laid vacant until 1983, when the Kripalu Center purchased the mansion's section of the property.

Meanwhile, the farm section of the estate had been passed down through the family to Stokes' son, Anson Phelps Stokes Jr., who lived there with his family. The old Shadowbrook farm is now the current campus of BCD. It consists of the original farm buildings, as well as new additions recently built. The fields that were once farmed and used for animal pasture are now sports fields and playgrounds, and much of the woodland is traced with hiking trails. Also, in 1972, a house for the head of school was built at the rear of the property.

== Art ==
The many different arts courses offered to the classes at BCD include both visual and performing arts, ceramics, painting & drawing, mixed media, sculpture, jewelry design, woodcraft, vocal ensemble, digital music composition, and guitar ensemble. Students from preschool through Grade 8 participate in art, music, and chorus classes throughout the year. Students also partake in shop class, and have the option of participating in band or chorus.

== Division structure ==
The school is sectioned into four divisions:

- Early Childhood

Early Childhood includes Beginner 2 year olds and up to Pre-Kindergarten. The school embraces the Reggio Emilio format of inviting and sustaining ongoing learning. Early Literacy skills are developed through imaginative play and daily exposure to books. Math concepts are investigated through hands on use of materials such as manipulatives, puzzles and blocks. Students begin to learn about the science process by engaging in their physical world and in focused activities such as caring for animals and following the weather.

- Lower School

The Lower School includes Kindergarten and grades 1, 2, and 3 and is carefully structured to support every child's individual journey, stimulating their minds and supporting their natural strengths. The focus of the Lower School is supporting and promoting each student's academic development as well as their social and emotional growth. Hands-on science labs provide opportunities to learn by doing.

- Middle School

Middle School, consisting of Grades 4,5, and 6, is where students study the academic classes as well as arts, foreign language, and technology. In these years the students adeptly move from the concrete to the abstract. They become independent learners, and motivated individuals and community members.

- Upper School

Upper School consists of 7th and 8th graders who demonstrate increasing levels of achievement in academics, the arts and athletics. Students are stewarded by a team of two teachers who serve as advisors and homeroom teachers guiding the social-emotional curriculum during these crucial adolescent years.

== Extracurriculars Activities ==
Berkshire Country Day School offers varied and excellent extra-curricular opportunities - Band, Ceramics, Chorus, Creative Writing, Drama, Newspaper, Photography, Yearbook, Competitive Sports including Soccer, Lacrosse, Gymnastics & more.
