= BCDMOS =

Chip manufacturing technology

BCDMOS is a complex circuit composed of bipolar, CMOS and DMOS devices.

BCDMOS technology allows to drive discrete high voltage components (several hundred of operating voltage) at high frequency while keeping high integration with technology nodes down to 40 nm or 22 nm. Many applications still use process node of 0.35μm in 2023.

Application of this type of circuits are found in automotive, audio amplifier, RF, industry, silicon photomultiplier (SiPM).

== History ==
SGS (now STmicroelectronics) invented the BCD (bipolar-CMOS-DMOS) technology - revolutionary at the time - in 1985 and has continually developed it ever since. BCD is a family of silicon processes, each of which combines the strengths of three different process technologies onto a single chip.

== Features ==
According to Maxim website, it is an innovative process characteristics that provides the following features:

1. high break-down voltage but small transistors,
2. quite low on-resistance, which is important for the integration of multiple power FETs of low resistivity,
3. double-metal-layer to support hi-current
4. combining thin film and poly-poly caps (in silicon). High-accuracy references can be integrated.

According to Dongbu HiTek's news, it claims to launch the first 0.18-micrometre BCDMOS process in industry. The new process integrates logic, analog and hi-voltage functions to reduce size.
