= Addresses in Turkey =

Overview of addresses in the Republic of Turkey

Turkish postal addresses are usually written with the name of the main street, minor street, apartment block name, apartment number, then finally Provinces of Turkey and five figure zipcode.

== Abbreviations ==
- mah. - mahallesi (district)
- mh. - mahallesi (district)
- blv. - bulvarı (boulevard)
- cad. - caddesi (road)
- cd. - caddesi (road)
- sk. - sokak (alley)
- ap. - apartmanı (apartment)
- kat - floor. Kat 1 is 2nd floor by American method
