= Canadian Depository for Securities =

Canadian financial services company

The Canadian Depository for Securities Ltd. (CDS Limited) is the world's second largest post-trade financial services company. It is the holding company for three operating subsidiaries: CDS Clearing and Depository Services Inc., CDS Securities Management Solutions Inc., and CDS Innovations Inc.

CDS Clearing and Depository Services Inc. (CDS Clearing) is Canada's national securities depository, clearing and settlement hub supporting Canada's equity, fixed income and money markets, holding almost $4 trillion on deposit, processing over almost 374 million domestic securities trades annually.

Internationally, CDS Clearing settles over 41 million cross-border transactions with the U.S. annually, and has custodial relationships with The Depository Trust Company (DTC), Japan Securities Depository Centre, Inc. (JASDEC), Euroclear France and Skandinaviska Enskilda Banken (SEB).

CDS Limited is owned by TMX Group Inc. CDS is regulated by the Ontario Securities Commission, the Autorité des marchés financiers (AMF) in Québec, the British Columbia Securities Commission and the Bank of Canada, with working and reporting relationships with the Canadian Securities Administrators, other provincial securities commissions and the Office of the Superintendent of Financial Institutions.

== See also ==
- Americas Central Securities Depositories Association
