= University of Alaska Fairbanks eCampus =

Virtual learning offering of the University of Alaska

Coordinates: 64°49′40″N 147°48′42″W

UAF eCampus is the name for online course offerings at the University of Alaska Fairbanks. UAF eCampus was renamed from UAF eLearning in 2018, and previously known as the Center for Distance Education, which was founded in 1987.

UAF eCampus is housed under the Office of the Provost at the University of Alaska Fairbanks.
