= Geely CD =

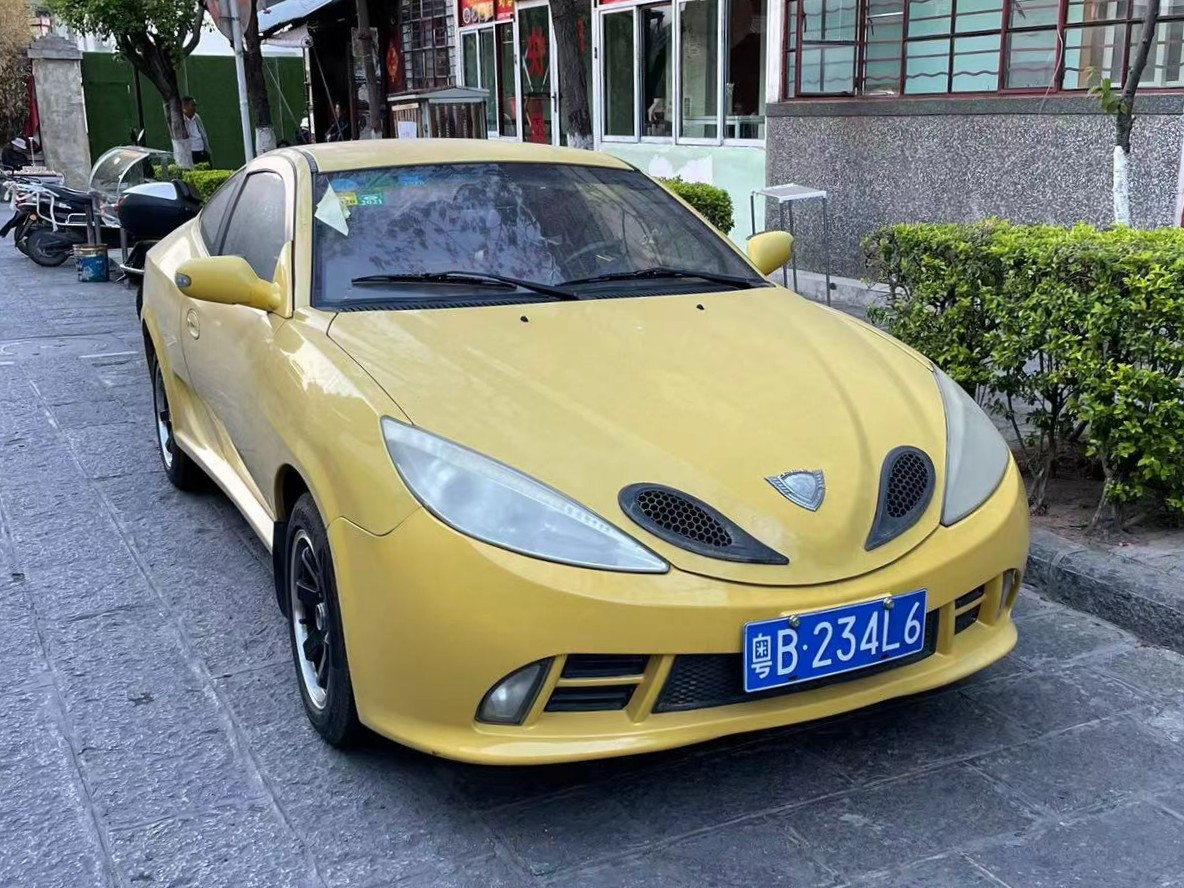

Overview
- Manufacturer: Geely Automobile
- Also called: Geely Chinese Dragon
- Production: 2009–2011

Body and chassis
- Class: Sports car (S)
- Body style: 2-door coupe
- Related: Geely CK

Powertrain
- Engine: 1.5 L MR479QA I4; 1.8 L JL481Q I4
- Transmission: 5 speed manual

Dimensions
- Wheelbase: 1,453 mm (57.2 in)
- Length: 4,085 mm (160.8 in)
- Width: 1,714 mm (67.5 in)
- Height: 1,370 mm (53.9 in)
- Curb weight: 1,370 kg (3,020 lb)

Chronology
- Predecessor: Geely BL

The Geely CD is a 2-door coupé produced by Chinese manufacturer Geely Automobile from 2009 to 2011.

== Overview ==
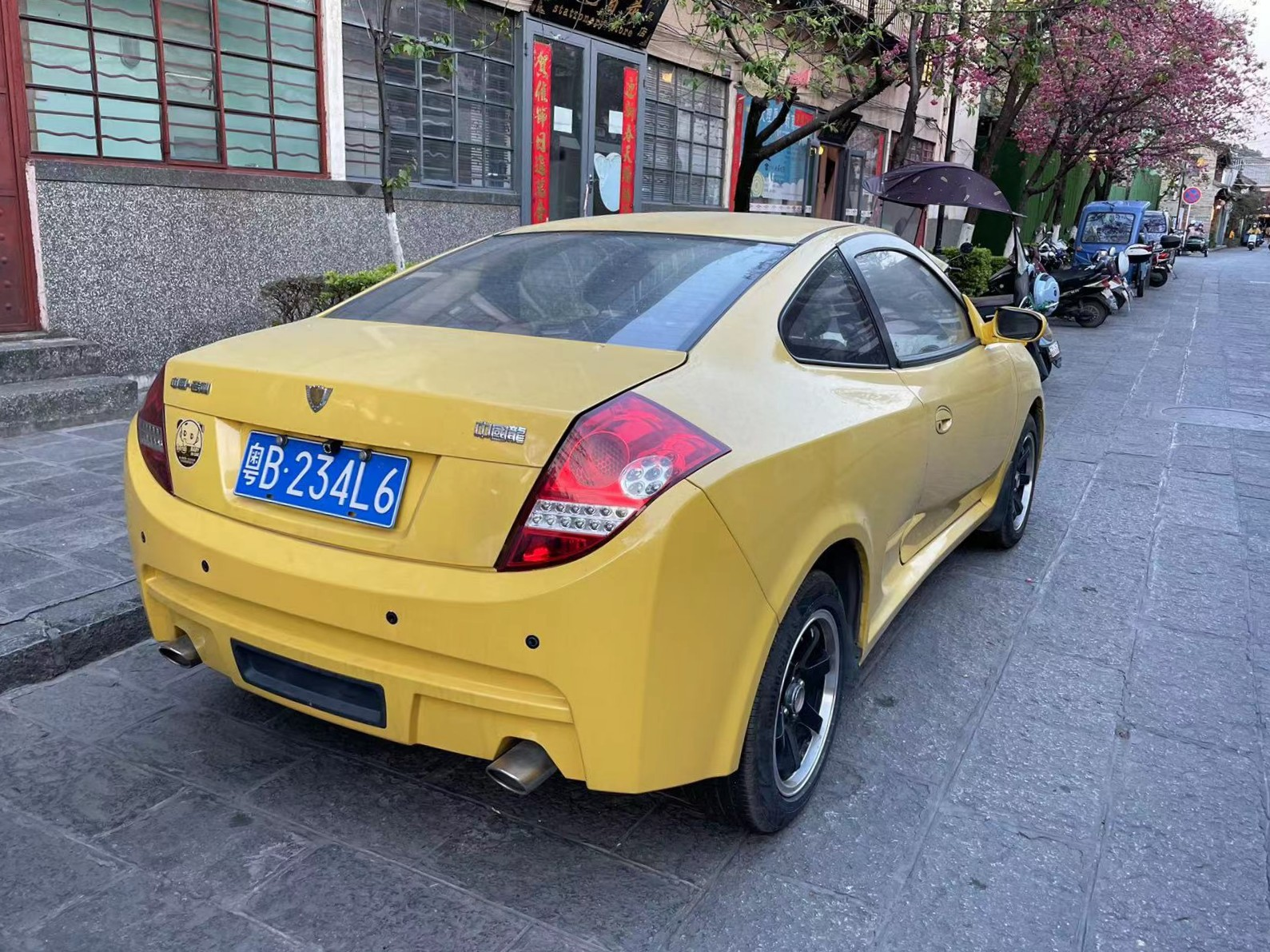
The rear of the CD

The Chinese name for the Geely CD is the "Geely Zhongguolong" (中国龙), meaning "Chinese Dragon", with the "CD" name being an initialism of the translation. The CD was shown at the Frankfurt Motor Show in 2005, along with four other Geely models. The CD was designed with help from Daewoo. Its 1.5 L engine is based on one from Toyota. It produces 94 hp (70 kW) at 6000 rpm.
