= CLP =

CLP may stand for:

== Biology ==
- CLP protease family, a family of proteolytic enzymes
  - Endopeptidase Clp, an enzyme complex
  - ATP-dependent Clp protease proteolytic subunit, a catalytic subunit of the Clp complex (encoded by the CLPP gene in humans)
- Cleft lip and palate

== Businesses ==
- CLP Group, formerly China Light and Power
- Connecticut Light and Power Company

== Computing, mathematics, and technology ==
- Cell Loss Priority
- COIN-OR Linear Program Solver
- Communication Linking Protocol
- Congruence lattice problem
- Constraint Logic Programming
- Constraint logic programming (Real)
- Control Language Programming, an IBM programming language used on the System/38, AS/400, and successors
- Convergent Linux Platform

== Political parties ==
- Canadian Labour Party, former
- Communist Labor Party of America, predecessors of the Communist Party USA
- Constituency Labour Party, a sub-division of the British Labour Party representing a single UK constituency
- Country Liberal Party, Northern Territory, Australia

== Certifications ==
- Certificate in Legal Practice (Malaysia)
- Certified Landscape Professional

== Transport ==
- Clapham High Street railway station, London, National Rail station code CLP
- Clarks Point Airport, Alaska, IATA airport code CLP

== Other uses ==
- AOL Community Leader Program
- CLP Regulation on classification, labelling and packaging of chemicals, EU
- Chilean peso, the currency of Chile by ISO 4217 code
- Cloppenburg (district), Germany
- Copa de la Liga Profesional, an Argentine football competition
- Carnegie Library of Pittsburgh, a public library system in the United States
