= CLPP =

CLPP may refer to:

- CLP protease family, a family of proteolytic enzymes
  - Endopeptidase Clp, an enzyme complex
  - ATP-dependent Clp protease proteolytic subunit, a catalytic subunit of the Clp complex (encoded by the CLPP gene in humans)
- Local Public Planning Council, a system of local government in Venezuela
