= N-end rule =

Empiric predictor of proteolytic rate in biochemistry

The N-end rule is a rule that governs the rate of protein degradation through recognition of the N-terminal residue of proteins. The rule states that the N-terminal amino acid of a protein determines its half-life (time after which half of the total amount of a given polypeptide is degraded). The rule applies to both eukaryotic and prokaryotic organisms, but with different strength, rules, and outcome. In eukaryotic cells, these N-terminal residues are recognized and targeted by ubiquitin ligases, mediating ubiquitination thereby marking the protein for degradation. The rule was initially discovered by Alexander Varshavsky and co-workers in 1986. However, only rough estimations of protein half-life can be deduced from this 'rule', as N-terminal amino acid modification can lead to variability and anomalies, whilst amino acid impact can also change from organism to organism. Other degradation signals, known as degrons, can also be found in sequence.

== Rules in different organisms ==
The rule may operate differently in different organisms.

=== Yeast ===
N-terminal residues - approximate half-life of proteins for S. cerevisiae

- Met, Gly, Ala, Ser, Thr, Val, Pro - > 20 hrs (stabilizing)
- Ile, Glu - approx. 30 min (stabilizing)
- Tyr, Gln - approx. 10 min (destabilizing)
- Leu, Phe, Asp, Lys - approx. 3 min (destabilizing)
- Arg - approx. 2 min (destabilizing)

=== Mammals ===
N-terminal residues - approximate half-life of proteins in mammalian systems

- Val (V)→ 100h
- Met (M), Gly (G) → 30h
- Pro (P) → 20h
- Ile (I)→ 20h
- Thr (T) → 7.2h
- Leu (L) → 5.5h
- Ala (A) → 4.4h
- His (H) → 3.5h
- Trp (W) → 2.8h
- Tyr (Y) → 2.8h
- Ser (S) → 1.9h
- Asn (N) → 1.4h
- Lys (K) → 1.3h
- Cys (C) → 1.2h
- Asp (D) → 1.1h
- Phe (F) → 1.1h
- Glu (E) → 1.0h
- Arg (R) → 1.0h
- Gln (Q) → 0.8h

=== Bacteria ===
In Escherichia coli, positively-charged and some aliphatic and aromatic residues on the N-terminus, such as arginine, lysine, leucine, phenylalanine, tyrosine, and tryptophan, have short half-lives of around two minutes and are rapidly degraded. These residues (when located at the N-terminus of a protein) are referred to as destabilising residues. In bacteria, destabilising residues can be further defined as primary destabilising residues (leucine, phenylalanine, tyrosine, and tryptophan) or secondary destabilising residues (arginine, lysine and in a special case methionine ). Secondary destabilising residues are modified by the attachment of a Primary destabilising residue by the enzyme leucyl/phenylalanyl-tRNA-protein transferase. All other amino acids when located at the N-terminus of a protein are referred to as stabilising residues and have half-lives of more than 10 hours . Proteins bearing an N-terminal primary destabilising residue are specifically recognised by the bacterial N-recognin (recognition component) ClpS. ClpS is as a specific adaptor protein for the ATP-dependent AAA+ protease ClpAP, and hence ClpS delivers N-degron substrates to ClpAP for degradation.

A complicating issue is that the first residue of bacterial proteins is normally expressed with an N-terminal formylmethionine (f-Met). The formyl group of this methionine is quickly removed, and the methionine itself is then removed by methionyl aminopeptidase. The removal of the methionine is more efficient when the second residue is small and uncharged (for example alanine), but inefficient when it is bulky and charged such as arginine. Once the f-Met is removed, the second residue becomes the N-terminal residue and are subject to the N-end rule. Residues with middle sized side-chains such as leucine as the second residue therefore may have a short half-life.

=== Chloroplasts ===
There are several reasons why it is possible that the N-end rule functions in the chloroplast organelle of plant cells as well. The first piece of evidence comes from the endosymbiotic theory which encompasses the idea that chloroplasts are derived from cyanobacteria, photosynthetic organisms that can convert light into energy. It is thought that the chloroplast developed from an endosymbiosis between a eukaryotic cell and a cyanobacterium, because chloroplasts share several features with the bacterium, including photosynthetic capabilities. The bacterial N-end rule is already well documented; it involves the Clp protease system which consists of the adaptor protein ClpS and the ClpA/P chaperone and protease core. A similar Clp system is present in the chloroplast stroma, suggesting that the N-end rule might function similarly in chloroplasts and bacteria.

Additionally, a 2013 study in Arabidopsis thaliana revealed the protein ClpS1, a possible plastid homolog of the bacterial ClpS recognin. ClpS is a bacterial adaptor protein that is responsible for recognizing protein substrates via their N-terminal residues and delivering them to a protease core for degradation. This study suggests that ClpS1 is functionally similar to ClpS, also playing a role in substrate recognition via specific N-terminal residues (degrons) like its bacterial counterpart. It is posited that upon recognition, ClpS1 binds to these substrate proteins and brings them to the ClpC chaperone of the protease core machinery to initiate degradation.

In another study, Arabidopsis thaliana stromal proteins were analyzed to determine the relative abundance of specific N-terminal residues. This study revealed that Alanine, Serine, Threonine, and Valine were the most abundant N-terminal residues, while Leucine, Phenylalanine, Tryptophan, and Tyrosine (all triggers for degradation in bacteria) were among the residues that were rarely detected.

Furthermore, an affinity assay using ClpS1 and N-terminal residues was performed to determine whether ClpS1 did indeed have specific binding partners. This study revealed that Phenylalanine and Tryptophan bind specifically to ClpS1, making them prime candidates for N-degrons in chloroplasts.

Further research is currently being conducted to confirm whether the N-end rule operates in chloroplasts.

=== Apicoplast ===
An apicoplast is a derived non-photosynthetic plastid found in most Apicomplexa, including Toxoplasma gondii, Plasmodium falciparum and other Plasmodium spp. (parasites causing malaria). Similar to plants, several Apicomplexan species, including Plasmodium falciparum contain all of the necessary components required for an apicoplast-localized Clp-protease, including a potential homolog of the bacterial ClpS N-recognin. In vitro data demonstrate that Plasmodium falciparum ClpS is able to recognize a variety of N-terminal primary destabilizing residues, not only the classic bacterial primary destabilizing residues (leucine, phenylalanine, tyrosine and tryptophan) but also N-terminal isoleucine and hence exhibits broad specificity (in comparison to its bacterial counterpart).
