= ATP-dependent Clp protease adaptor protein ClpS =

Bacteria protein

ClpS
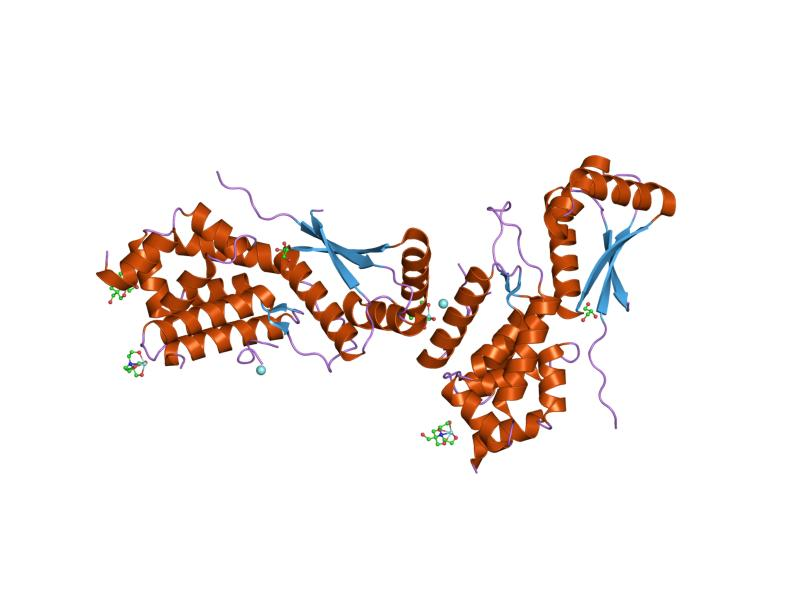
- clpns with fragments

Identifiers
- Symbol: ClpS
- Pfam: PF02617
- InterPro: IPR003769
- SCOP2: 1mbx / SCOPe / SUPFAM
Available protein structures:
- PDB: IPR003769 PF02617 (ECOD; PDBsum)
- AlphaFold: IPR003769; PF02617

In molecular biology, the ATP-dependent Clp protease adaptor protein ClpS is a bacterial protein. In the bacterial cytosol, ATP-dependent protein degradation is performed by several different chaperone-protease pairs, including ClpAP. ClpS directly influences the ClpAP machine by binding to the N-terminal domain of the chaperone ClpA. The degradation of ClpAP substrates, both SsrA-tagged proteins and ClpA itself, is specifically inhibited by ClpS. ClpS modifies ClpA substrate specificity, potentially redirecting degradation by ClpAP toward aggregated proteins.

ClpS is an N-recognin in the N-end rule pathway. ClpS interacts with protein substrates that have a bulky hydrophobic residue (leucine, phenylalanine, tyrosine, and tryptophan) at the N-terminus. The protein substrate is then degraded by the ClpAP protease.

ClpS is a small alpha/beta protein that consists of three alpha-helices connected to three antiparallel beta-strands. The protein has a globular shape, with a curved layer of three antiparallel alpha-helices over a twisted antiparallel beta-sheet. Dimerization of ClpS may occur through its N-terminal domain. This short extended N-terminal region in ClpS is followed by the central seven-residue beta-strand, which is flanked by two other beta-strands in a small beta-sheet.

== See also ==
- Endopeptidase Clp
- Clp protease family
