= Dordaviprone =

Chemical compound

Clinical data
- Trade names: Modeyso
- Other names: ONC201, ONC-201
- AHFS/Drugs.com: Monograph
- MedlinePlus: a625097
- License data: US DailyMed: Dordaviprone
- Routes of administration: By mouth
- Drug class: Protease activator
- ATC code: None

Legal status
- Legal status: US: ℞-only

Identifiers
- IUPAC name: 11-benzyl-7-[(2-methylphenyl)methyl]-2,5,7,11-tetrazatricyclo[7.4.0.02,6]trideca-1(9),5-dien-8-one
- CAS Number: 1616632-77-9; as HCl: 1638178-82-1
- PubChem CID: 73777259
- DrugBank: DB14844; as HCl: DBSALT003291
- ChemSpider: 30904994
- UNII: 9U35A31JAI; as HCl: 53VG71J90J
- KEGG: D12733; as HCl: D12734
- ChEBI: CHEBI:232328
- ChEMBL: ChEMBL4297310

Chemical and physical data
- Formula: C_{24}H_{26}N_{4}O
- Molar mass: 386.499 g·mol^{−1}
- 3D model (JSmol): Interactive image
- SMILES: CC1=CC=CC=C1CN2C(=O)C3=C(CCN(C3)CC4=CC=CC=C4)N5C2=NCC5
- InChI: InChI=1S/C24H26N4O/c1-18-7-5-6-10-20(18)16-28-23(29)21-17-26(15-19-8-3-2-4-9-19)13-11-22(21)27-14-12-25-24(27)28/h2-10H,11-17H2,1H3; Key:VLULRUCCHYVXOH-UHFFFAOYSA-N; Key:HKBXPCQCBQFDML-UHFFFAOYSA-N

Dordaviprone, sold under the brand name Modeyso, is an anti-cancer medication used for the treatment of diffuse midline glioma (a type of brain tumor). Dordaviprone is a protease activator of the mitochondrial caseinolytic protease P. It is dopamine receptor D2 antagonist and an allosteric activator of the mitochondrial caseinolytic protease P.

Dordaviprone was approved for medical use in the United States in August 2025. It is the first approval of a systemic therapy for H3 K27M-mutant diffuse midline glioma by the US Food and Drug Administration (FDA). The FDA considers it to be a first-in-class medication.

== Medical uses ==
Dordaviprone is indicated for the treatment of people with diffuse midline glioma harboring an H3 K27M mutation with progressive disease following prior therapy.

== History ==
Efficacy was evaluated in an integrated efficacy population of 50 participants with recurrent H3 K27M-mutant diffuse midline glioma enrolled across five open-label, non-randomized clinical trials conducted in the US (ONC006 [NCT02525692], ONC013 [NCT03295396], ONC014 [NCT03416530], ONC016 [NCT05392374], and ONC018 [NCT03134131]). The efficacy population comprised participants who received single-agent dordaviprone for diffuse midline glioma harboring an H3 K27M mutation and had progressive and measurable disease per Response Assessment in Neuro-Oncology-High Grade Glioma (RANO-HGG) criteria. Participants were also at least 90 days post radiation therapy, had an adequate washout period from prior anticancer therapies, a Karnofsky Performance Status/Lansky Performance Status (KPS/LPS) score ≥ 60, and stable or decreasing corticosteroid use. Participants with diffuse intrinsic pontine glioma, primary spinal tumors, atypical histologies, or cerebrospinal fluid dissemination were excluded.

The US Food and Drug Administration granted the application for dordaviprone priority review, orphan drug, rare pediatric disease, and fast track designations.

== Society and culture ==
=== Legal status ===
Dordaviprone was approved for medical use in the United States in August 2025.

=== Names ===
Dordaviprone is the international nonproprietary name.

Dordaviprone is sold under the brand name Modeyso.

Dordaviprone was previously known as ONC201, and even earlier, TIC10, during its developmental phase.
