= Alexander Varshavsky =

Russian-American biochemist

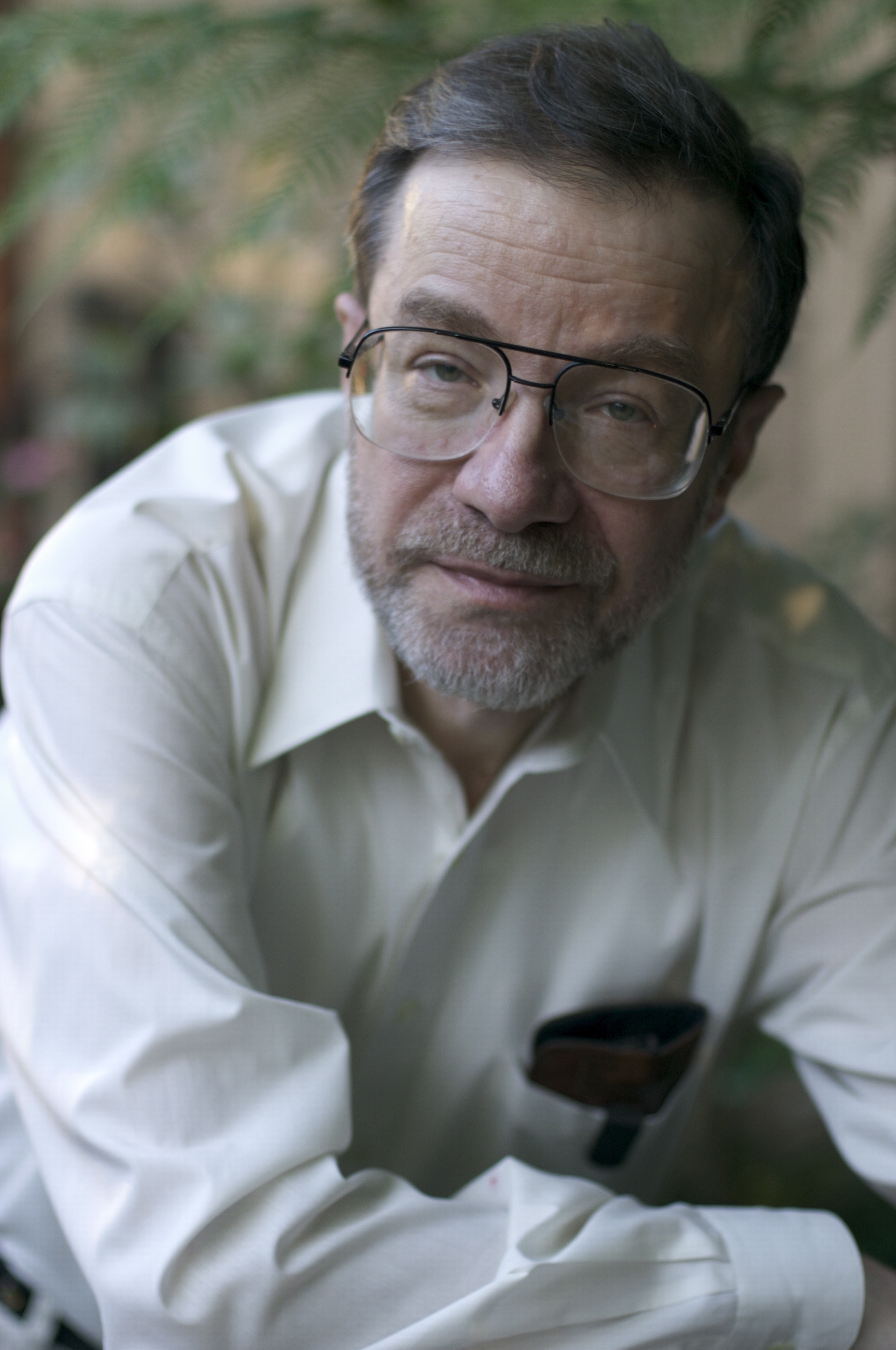
Varshavsky (in 2007)

Alexander J. Varshavsky (Russian: Александр Яковлевич Варшавский; born 1946 in Moscow) is a Russian-American biochemist and geneticist. He works at the California Institute of Technology (Caltech) as the Morgan Professor of Biology. Varshavsky left Russia in 1977, emigrating to United States.

His laboratory, initially at the Massachusetts Institute of Technology, and later at Caltech, has discovered, during the 1980s, the first degradation signals (degrons) in short-lived proteins and biological fundamentals of the ubiquitin system. His current research continues to focus on the ubiquitin system and N-degron pathways.

== Education and appointments ==
Varshavsky received a B.S. degree from the Moscow University (Russia) (1970) and Ph.D. from the Institute of Molecular Biology, Moscow, Russia (1973). From 1973-1977, he worked as a Junior Scientist at the Moscow's Institute of Molecular Biology, before becoming a faculty member at MIT, Cambridge, MA, USA (1977-1991). From 1992 to 2016, he worked as the Howard Smits Professor of Cell Biology at the Division of Biology and Biological Engineering, California Institute of Technology (Caltech), in Pasadena, CA. Since 2017, he is the Thomas Hunt Morgan Professor of Biology at Caltech.

== Honorary memberships ==
Varshavsky is a Fellow of the American Academy of Arts and Sciences (1987), a Member of the U.S. National Academy of Sciences (1995), a Fellow of the American Academy of Microbiology (2000), a Member of the American Philosophical Society (2001), a Fellow of the American Association for the Advancement of Science (2002), a Foreign Associate of the European Molecular Biology Organization (2001), and a Foreign Member of the European Academy of Sciences (Academia Europaea) (2005).

== Awards ==
Varshavsky received the Merit Award from the National Institutes of Health (1998), the Novartis-Drew Award in Biomedical Sciences (1998), the Gairdner International Award (Canada, 1999), the Sloan Prize in Cancer Research (2000), the Albert Lasker Award in Basic Medical Research (2000), the Shubitz Prize in Cancer Research (2000), the Hoppe-Seyler Award (Germany, 2000), the Pasarow Award in Cancer Research (2001), Wolf Prize in Medicine (Israel, 2001), the Max Planck Award (Germany, 2001), the Massry Prize (2001), the Merck Award (2001), the Louisa Gross Horwitz Prize (Columbia University) (2002), the Wilson Medal (2004), the Stein and Moore Award (2005), the March of Dimes Prize in Developmental Biology (2006), the Griffuel Prize in Cancer Research (France, 2006), the Gagna and Van Heck Prize (Belgium, 2006), the Weinstein Award in Cancer Research (2007), the Schleiden Medal (Germany, 2007), the Gotham Prize in Cancer Research (2008), the Vilcek Prize in Biomedical Sciences (2010), the BBVA Award in Biomedicine (Spain, 2001), the Otto Warburg Prize (Germany, 2012), the King Faisal Prize in Science (Saudi Arabia, 2012), the Breakthrough Prize in Life Sciences (2014), the Albany Prize in Medicine (2014), the Grande Médaille of the French Academy of Sciences (France, 2016), the Wieland Prize (Germany, 2017), the IUBMB Medal from the International Union of Biochemistry and Molecular Biology (2019), the Debrecen Award in Molecular Medicine (Hungary, 2022), the Hope Award in Basic Science (2023), and the Hogg Award in Cancer Research (2023). Dr. Paul Janssen Award for Biomedical Research (2024)

== Contributions in the ubiquitin field ==
In 1986, the Varshavsky laboratory discovered and analyzed the first degradation signals (degrons) in short-lived proteins. "Degron", by now a standard term, was introduced by Varshavsky in 1991. During 1984-1990, the Varshavsky lab discovered biological fundamentals of the ubiquitin system. The field of ubiquitin and regulated protein degradation was created in the 1980s through complementary discoveries, during 1978-1990, that revealed three sets of previously unknown facts. The first set of these facts (item 1 below) was discovered by the A. Hershko laboratory at the Technion (Haifa, Israel) (reviewed in ref.).The other two sets (items 2 and 3 below) were discovered by the Varshavsky laboratory, then at the Massachusetts Institute of Technology (Cambridge, Massachusetts).

(1) A. Ciechanover and A. Hershko demonstrated that ubiquitin, a 76-residue protein, is covalently conjugated to other proteins in cell extracts, a novel protein modification involved in the ATP-dependent protein degradation in extracts from mammalian reticulocytes (reviewed in ref.).Ubiquitylation of a test protein in a reticulocyte extract caused it to become short-lived in the extract. Hershko, Ciechanover, Rose and their colleagues also discovered that ubiquitin-protein conjugation is mediated by a cascade of enzymes, termed E1, E2 and E3. These studies were carried out using cell-free (in vitro) extracts and isolated E1-E3 enzymes. At that time, in the early 1980s, physiological significance of the ubiquitin system and its specific biological functions remained unknown.

(2) In 1986, the in vivo selectivity of ubiquitylation (ubiquitin-protein conjugation) was shown, by the Varshavsky lab, to be determined by degradation signals (degrons) in cellular proteins. N-terminal degrons, called N-degrons, were the first degradation signals to be discovered. Ubiquitin-dependent proteolytic systems that selectively destroy proteins bearing N-degrons are called N-degron pathways. Prior to 2019, these systems were called N-end rule pathways.

(3) During 1984-1990, the Varshavsky lab discovered that ubiquitylation has remarkably broad biological functions, to a large extent through control of the in vivo levels of cellular proteins. Varshavsky and coworkers demonstrated in 1984 that the bulk of protein degradation in living cells requires ubiquitylation. Soon thereafter, they identified the first specific biological functions of ubiquitylation, including DNA repair (1987), the cell division cycle (1988), stress responses (1987), protein synthesis (1989), and transcriptional regulation (1990). In addition, the Varshavsky lab identified the MATalpha2 transcriptional repressor as the first physiological substrate of the ubiquitin system (in 1990), cloned the first genes encoding ubiquitin precursors (in 1984-1989), identified the first ubiquitin-conjugating (E2) enzymes with specific biological functions (in 1987-1988), discovered a nonproteolytic function of ubiquitin (its activity as a cotranslational chaperone) (in 1989), cloned the first deubiquitylating enzymes, termed UBP1-UBP3, and cloned the first specific E3 ubiquitin ligase, termed UBR1 (in 1990). The latter advance opened a particularly large field, since later studies showed that the human genome encodes more than 600 distinct E3 ubiquitin ligases. This multitude of E3s underlies the enormous functional range of the ubiquitin system. In addition, the Varshavsky lab discovered, in 1989, the first specific substrate-linked polyubiquitin chains, and demonstrated, in 1990, the subunit selectivity of degradation of oligomeric proteins by the ubiquitin system (references and references therein).

In sum, the complementary discoveries by the laboratories of Hershko and Varshavsky during the 1980s (items 1-3 above) yielded the modern paradigm of the central importance of protein degradation for the regulation of most proteins in vivo, on a par with the control by transcription and translation. Given the exceptionally broad functional range of the ubiquitin system and numerous ways in which ubiquitin-dependent processes can malfunction in disease, from cancer and neurodegenerative syndromes to defects in immunity and other illnesses, including birth defects, the resulting change in our understanding of biological circuits has major implications for medicine.

Varshavsky and coworkers continued their studies of the ubiquitin system in the ensuing decades (from 1990 to the present), focusing on N-degron pathways. Wide-ranging functions of these pathways include the selective destruction of misfolded proteins, the sensing of specific compounds such as oxygen, heme, short peptides and nitric oxide, the regulation of DNA transcription, replication, repair, and chromosome cohesion/segregation, the control of peptide transport, meiosis, chaperones, cytoskeletal proteins, gluconeogenesis, autophagy, apoptosis, adaptive and innate immunity, cardiovascular development, neurogenesis, spermatogenesis, and circadian rhythms; diverse involvements in human diseases such as cancer, neurodegeneration, and perturbations of immunity; a variety of roles in bacteria; and many functions in plants, including seed germination and oxygen/NO sensing (references and references therein).

== Contributions outside the ubiquitin field ==
1. The discovery, in 1978-1979, of the first nucleosome-depleted, nuclease-hypersensitive regions in chromosomes. Such "exposed" chromosomal segments are characteristic of transcriptional promoters, recombination hotspots, and the origins of DNA replication.

2. The discovery, in 1980-1981, of the first pathway of chromosome cohesion/segregation. It involves the formation, during DNA replication, of multiply intertwined (multicatenated) sister chromatids, and their later stepwise decatenation by type-2 DNA topoisomerases.

3. The idea, in 2007, that DNA deletions (and less frequent insertions) that are characteristic of cancer cells can be used as non-reverting cancer-specific signposts, thereby making possible a selective therapy of cancers that would be impervious to tumor progression.

4. A verifiable conjecture about molecular basis of sleep causation, termed the fragment generation (FG) hypothesis. According to the FG hypothesis, a molecular cause of sleep stems from production, during wakefulness, of numerous extracellular and intracellular protein-sized protein fragments that can be transiently beneficial but can also perturb, through their diverse and cumulative effects, the functioning of the brain and other organs. The FG hypothesis posits that sleep evolved, at least in part, to counteract overproduction (owing to an insufficiently fast elimination) of hundreds of different protein fragments during wakefulness. The FG hypothesis is consistent with available experimental evidence. It remains to be verified.

5. Inventions of genetic and biochemical methods (1980-2017) (see references and references therein):

(i) A method for two-dimensional electrophoretic mapping of DNA replication/multicatenation intermediates, in 1980-1981.

(ii) Nucleosome mapping using a two-dimensional hybridization method, in 1982.

(iii) The ubiquitin fusion technique, in 1986. This method makes it possible to expose, in vivo, a desired N-terminal residue in a protein of interest. Owing to the mechanics of the genetic code, all nascent proteins bear the N-terminal Met residue, which is either retained in or removed from mature proteins. The ubiquitin fusion technique makes it possible to "bypass" the endogenous rules of N-terminal Met removal and retention.

(iv) Chromatin immunoprecipitation (ChIP) assay, in 1988. Advanced versions of ChIP are being used for mapping in vivo locations of chromosomal proteins.

(v) Mutations in many (most) genes that cause a hypersensitivity to heavy water (D_{2}O), a novel and generally applicable conditional phenotype, in 1988.

(vi) Heat-activated N-degron for producing temperature-sensitive mutants, in 1994.

(vii) Split-ubiquitin method for detecting protein interactions in vivo, in 1994. The central idea of the split-ubiquitin technique opened the field of single-subunit split proteins, such as split-GFP, split lactamase, split Cas9 CRISPR nuclease, and many other split protein sensors and effectors.

(viii) Ubiquitin translocation assay, in 1994, for analyzing, in vivo, specific mechanisms and kinetics of protein translocation across cellular membranes.

(ix) Ubiquitin sandwich technique, in 2000. It uses ubiquitin fusions and multiple tandem reporters to detect and measure cotranslational proteolysis in vivo.

(x) Subunit decoy technique, in 2013, for analyzing the in vivo regulation of subunit stoichiometries in oligomeric proteins.

(xi) Promoter reference technique, in 2017. This reference-based method for measuring the in vivo protein degradation uses RNA aptamers and bypasses the necessity of global translation inhibitors in a chase-degradation assay.

1. Alexander Varshavsky, California Institute of Technology (Caltech) (https://www.bbe.caltech.edu/people/alexander-varshavsky).

2. Varshavsky, A. "(2022) Interview about life and work, to David Zierler, Caltech Heritage Project".. (https://heritageproject.caltech.edu/interviews-updates/alexander-varshavsky).

3. Bachmair, A., Finley, D., Varshavsky, A. (1986)) In vivo half-life of a protein is a function of Its N-terminal residue. Science 234: 179–186. doi:10.1126/science.3018930.

4. Varshavsky, A. (2008) Discovery of cellular regulation by protein degradation. Journal of Biological Chemistry 283: 34469-34489. doi:10.1074/jbc.x800009200.

5. Varshavsky, A. (2019)) N-degron and C-degron pathways of protein degradation. Proceedings of the National Academy of Sciences 116 : 358–366. doi:10.1073/pnas.1816596116.

6. Jentsch, S., McGrath, J. P., Varshavsky, A. (1987) The yeast DNA repair gene RAD6 encodes a ubiquitin-conjugating enzyme. Nature 329: 131-134. doi:10.1038/329131a0.

7. Johnson, E. S., Gonda, D.K., Varshavsky, A. (1990) Cis-trans recognition and subunit-specific degradation of short-lived proteins. Nature 346: 287-291. doi:10.1038/346287a0.

8. Varshavsky, A. (2014). "Discovery of the biology of the ubiquitin system". Journal of the American Medical Association (JAMA) 311: 1969. doi:10.1001/jama.2014.5549.

9. Hershko, A. Ciechanover, A., Varshavsky, A. (2000) The ubiquitin system. Nature Medicine 6: 1073-1081. doi:10.1038/80384.

10. Oh, J.H., Hyun, J.Y., Chen, S. J., Varshavsky, A. (2020) "Five enzymes of the Arg/N-degron pathway form a targeting complex: the concept of superchanneling". Proceedings of the National Academy of Sciences 117 (20): 10778-10788. doi:10.1073/pnas.2003043117.

11. Vu, T. T. M., Mitchell, D. C., Gygi, S. P., Varshavsky, A. (2020) "The Arg/N-degron pathway targets transcription factors and regulates specific genes". Proceedings of the National Academy of Sciences 117: 31094-31104. doi:10.1073/pnas.2020124117

12. Varshavsky, A. (2007) Targeting the absence: homozygous DNA deletions as immutable signposts for cancer therapy. Proceedings of the National Academy of Sciences 104: 14935-14940. doi:10.1073/pnas.0706546104.

13. Varshavsky, A., Lewis, K., Chen, S. J. (2023). Deletions of DNA in cancer and their possible uses for therapy. BioEssays 45. doi:10.1002/bies.202300051.

14. Varshavsky, A. (2019) On the cause of sleep: protein fragments, the concept of sentinels, and links to epilepsy. Proceedings of the National Academy of Sciences 116: 10773-10782. doi:10.1073/pnas.1904709116.

== Notes ==
- Caltech bio
- The Gotham prize
