= Convergent Linux Platform =

Convergent Linux Platform or CLP for short is an initiative of a la Mobile, inc. to present to the market a Linux-embedded mobile phone with raised security issues as well as the first Linux-based smart phone operating system.
