= Degron =

Part of a protein regulating rates of degradation

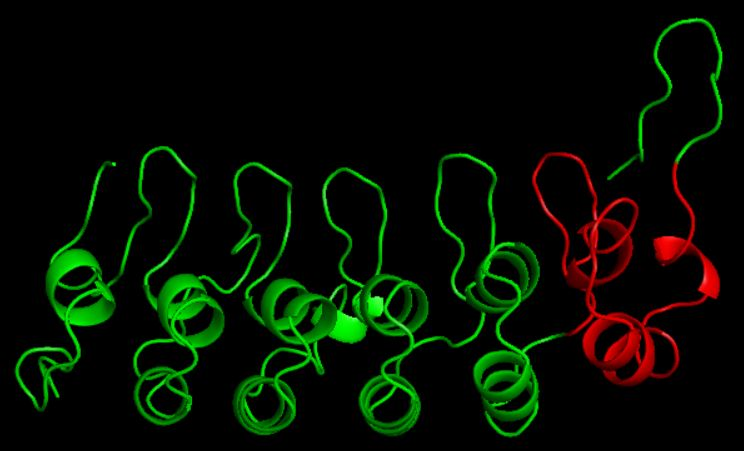
Shown here in green is a portion of IκBα, an inhibitor of NF-κB and regulator of the immune system. The red region highlights the sixth ankyrin repeat domain, which contains a ubiquitin-independent degron.

A degron is a portion of a protein that is important in regulation of protein degradation rates. Known degrons include short amino acid sequences, structural motifs and exposed amino acids (often lysine or arginine) located anywhere in the protein. In fact, some proteins can even contain multiple degrons. Degrons are present in a variety of organisms, from the N-degrons (see N-end Rule) first characterized in yeast to the PEST sequence of mouse ornithine decarboxylase. Degrons have been identified in prokaryotes as well as eukaryotes. While there are many types of different degrons, and a high degree of variability even within these groups, degrons are all similar for their involvement in regulating the rate of a protein's degradation. Much like protein degradation (see proteolysis) mechanisms are categorized by their dependence or lack thereof on ubiquitin, a small protein involved in proteasomal protein degradation, degrons may also be referred to as either "ubiquitin-dependent" or "ubiquitin-independent".

== Types ==
Ubiquitin-dependent degrons are so named because they are implicated in the polyubiquitination process for targeting a protein to the proteasome. In some cases, the degron itself serves as the site for polyubiquitination as is seen in TAZ and β-catenin proteins. Because the exact mechanism by which a degron is involved in a protein's polyubiqutination is not always known, degrons are classified as ubiquitin-dependent if their removal from the protein leads to less ubiquitination or if their addition to another protein leads to more ubiquitination.

In contrast, ubiquitin-independent degrons are not necessary for the polyubiquitination of their protein. For example, the degron on IκBα, a protein involved in the regulation of the immune system, was not shown to be involved in ubiquitination since its addition to green fluorescent protein (GFP) did not increase ubiquitination. However, a degron can only hint at the mechanism by which a protein is degraded and so identifying and classifying a degron is only the first step in understanding the degradation process for its protein.

== Identification ==
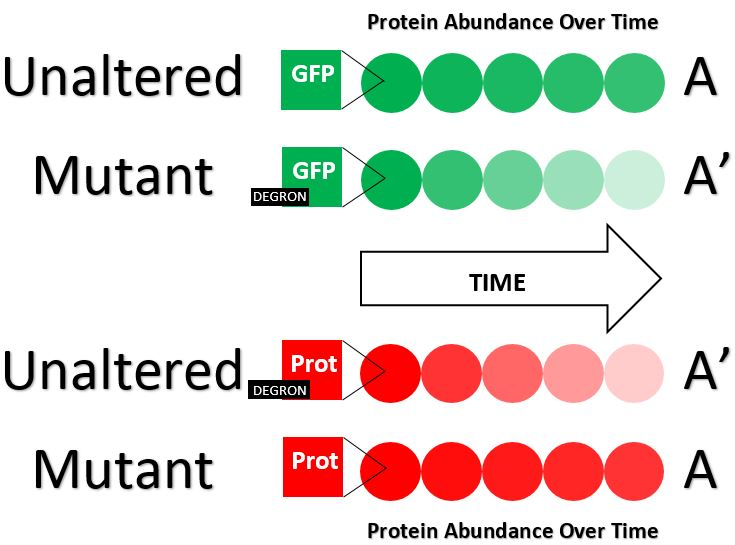
Shown is a diagram representing two degron-identifying procedures outlined in the text. In the first (green) procedure, the unaltered form of the protein remains abundant over time while the mutant form containing a degron candidate decreases rapidly. In the second (red) procedure the unaltered form of a protein containing the degron candidate decreases rapidly over time while the mutant form stripped of its degron remains abundant. A' versus A are used to notate protein forms containing the degron vs not containing the degron.

In order to identify a portion of a protein as a degron, there are often three steps performed. First, the degron candidate is fused to a stable protein, such as GFP, and protein abundances over time are compared between the unaltered protein and the fusion (as shown in green). If the candidate is in fact a degron, then the abundance of the fusion protein will decrease much faster than that of the unaltered protein. Second, a mutant form of the degron's protein is designed such that it lacks the degron candidate. Similar to before, the abundance of the mutant protein over time is compared to that of the unaltered protein (as shown in red). If the deleted degron candidate is in fact a degron, then the mutant protein abundance will decrease much slower than that of the unaltered protein. Recall that degrons are often referred to as "ubiquitin-dependent" or "ubiquitin-independent" The third step performed is often done after one or both of the previous two steps, because it serves to identify the ubiquitin dependence or lack thereof of a previously identified degron. In this step, protein A and A' (identical in every way except the presence of degron in A') will be examined. Note that mutation or fusion procedures could be performed here, so either A is a protein like GFP and A' is a fusion of GFP with the degron (as shown in green) or A' is the degron's protein and A is a mutant form without the degron (as shown in Red.) The amount of ubiquitin bound to A and to A' will be measured. A significant increase in the amount of ubiquitin in A' as compared to A will suggest that the degron is ubiquitin-dependent.

== See also ==
- N-end rule
- Proteasome
- proteolysis
