= AOL Community Leader Program =

The AOL Community Leader Program or AOL CLP was the official name for the large group of America Online online service volunteers who moderated chat rooms, message boards, and download libraries.

The program's roots dated back to the use of online remote volunteer "guides" by AOL predecessor QuantumLink at its start in 1985. The system which became AOL established the Community Leader Program officially in the early 1990s, and discontinued it in 2005. At the peak of the program, it is estimated that AOL had approximately 14,000 volunteers, including 350 non-adult teenagers.

== Responsibilities ==
Community Leaders had a wide variety of responsibilities, ranging from hosting chat rooms, monitoring message boards and file libraries, providing customer service, teaching online classes, and particularly creating and managing forum content. However, toward the end of the program, Community Leader duties were generally restricted to monitoring chat and message boards. In exchange for their services, AOL provided free service to their volunteers. Community Leaders also received special accounts (Price Index 77 or Overhead Accounts) that allowed them to restrict disruptive chat, hide inappropriate message board postings, and access private areas on the AOL service, such as the Community Leader Headquarters (CLHQ).

== Role ==
Although at times controversial, the Community Leader program arguably played a substantial role in the rapid growth and success of the America Online service in the mid-1990s. Because they were usually recruited from the more active users of a particular online forum, Community Leaders were often very passionate about the area for which they volunteered their time. This enthusiasm usually resulted in a greater sense of community and a higher level of professionalism in that forum. This in turn gave the AOL service more value over the less organized "frontier" of the Internet, at least in the eyes of users new to the online scene at the time. It also provided oversight with respect to forum content by knowledgeable individuals.

== Department of Labor investigation ==
In May 1999, Kelly Hallisey and Brian Williams, two former Community Leaders, filed a class action lawsuit against AOL, claiming that AOL volunteers performed work equivalent to employees and thus should be compensated according to the Fair Labor Standards Act. The plaintiffs argued that the Community Leader position required a significant amount of effort and detail to qualify the position as having an "employee relationship" with AOL. The plaintiffs specifically demonstrated how Community Leaders had to undergo a thorough, 3-month training program and were required to file timecards for shifts, work at least four hours per week, and submit detailed reports outlining their work activity during each shift. When AOL first started the program it charged for access to its services by the hour, thus Community Leaders, i.e. those who were heavy Internet users saved hundreds of dollars each month. This fact actually hurt AOL when the lawsuit began, however, as the reception of benefits (along with whether the work is full-time and displaces regular employees) is a factor that helps the Department of Labor determine if a volunteer should actually be paid. The U.S. Department of Labor investigated the report, but came to no conclusions, officially closing the investigation in 2001. In response to the investigation, AOL began drastically reducing volunteer responsibilities. By 2000, nearly all Community Leaders had lost content-editing rights and no longer provided customer service or technical support to AOL customers. Additionally, in many AOL forums, Community Leader supervisors became more lax about paperwork and shift hours.

In February 2008, the court in which the lawsuit was filed denied AOL's Motion to Dismiss and certified the case for class-action status. The court has ordered AOL to provide the names and contact information for all former Community Leaders to notify them and give them the opportunity to join the class-action lawsuit.

In February 2010, the United States for the Southern District of New York gave preliminary approval to a settlement between AOL and the Community Leaders totaling 15 million dollars. Final approval was granted in May 2010.

== End of Program ==
The Department of Labor investigation, which, at least in part prompted AOL to limit Community Leader responsibilities, caused issues for the company. Without unpaid volunteers, the company would have to hire employees to manage and post online content and run effective online communities previously done by Community Leaders. Leading up to and following the AOL Time Warner merger, AOL did not have the time or money to invest in building and maintaining its online community. The company's later focus on advertising as its major source of income rather than high quality bespoke online content, an intention that began earlier in 1996 when subscriber hourly rates were replaced with a single unlimited-use monthly fee, provided the company little apparent profit incentive to monetize community forums.

Along with the DOL investigation, and with less need for well-managed communities and membership in serious decline, AOL decided to terminate its volunteer program. In late May 2005, AOL informed its Community Leaders that they would be released from their positions on June 8 of that year. AOL offered volunteers 12 months of free service in compensation for their services. While many Community Leaders left the service after this announcement, others stayed with AOL and continued their efforts at building community, albeit in an unofficial role.

== See also ==
- Virtual management
- Virtual volunteering
- Wikipedia community (& Wikipedians)
