= ClpX =

Mammalian protein found in humans

CLPX

Identifiers
- Aliases: CLPX, ClpX, caseinolytic mitochondrial matrix peptidase chaperone subunit, EPP2, caseinolytic mitochondrial matrix peptidase chaperone subunit X
- External IDs: OMIM: 615611; MGI: 1346017; GeneCards: CLPX
Enzyme activity
EC #	BRENDA	ExPASy	KEGG	MetaCyc
3.6.4.10	↗	↗	↗	↗

Gene location (Human)
Chr.	Chromosome 15 (human)
Band	15q22.31	Start	65,148,219 bp
Band	15q22.31	End	65,185,342 bp

Gene location (Mouse)
Chr.	Chromosome 9 (mouse)
Band	9 C|9 35.22 cM	Start	65,201,542 bp
Band	9 C|9 35.22 cM	End	65,237,940 bp
RNA expression pattern
Bgee	Human / Mouse (ortholog); Top expressed in: sperm; Achilles tendon; secondary oocyte; amniotic fluid; epithelium of colon; gastrocnemius muscle; gonad; ventricular zone; right lobe of liver; muscle of thigh / Top expressed in: spermatid; spermatocyte; left lobe of liver; soleus muscle; right kidney; morula; interventricular septum; seminiferous tubule; muscle of thigh; myocardium of ventricle; More reference expression data
BioGPS	n/a
Gene ontology
Molecular function	unfolded protein binding; nucleotide binding; protein binding; peptidase activator activity; metal ion binding; ATP-dependent peptidase activity; ATPase activity; ATP binding
Cellular component	mitochondrial endopeptidase Clp complex; mitochondrial matrix; nucleoplasm; endopeptidase Clp complex; mitochondrial nucleoid; mitochondrion; cytosol; mitochondrial inner membrane
Biological process	proteolysis involved in cellular protein catabolic process; protein folding; positive regulation of peptidase activity; ATP metabolic process; protein catabolic process
Sources:Amigo / QuickGO
Orthologs
Databases	NCBI: entry; OMA: entry
Species	Human	Mouse
Entrez	10845	270166
Ensembl	ENSG00000166855	ENSMUSG00000015357
UniProt	O76031	Q9JHS4
RefSeq (mRNA)	NM_006660	NM_001044389; NM_011802
RefSeq (protein)	NP_006651; NP_006651.2	NP_001037854; NP_035932
Location (UCSC)	Chr 15: 65.15 – 65.19 Mb	Chr 9: 65.2 – 65.24 Mb
PubMed search
- Wikidata
View/Edit Human	View/Edit Mouse

ATP-dependent Clp protease ATP-binding subunit clpX-like, mitochondrial is an enzyme that in humans is encoded by the CLPX gene. This protein is a member of the family of AAA Proteins (AAA+ ATPase) and is a subunit of the Clp protease (Endopeptidase Clp).

== Structure ==
=== Tertiary ===
The human enzyme ClpX is drawn from the protein complex structure of Clp protease. These hexameric HSP100/Clp proteins produce ring like structures resembling chaperonins.

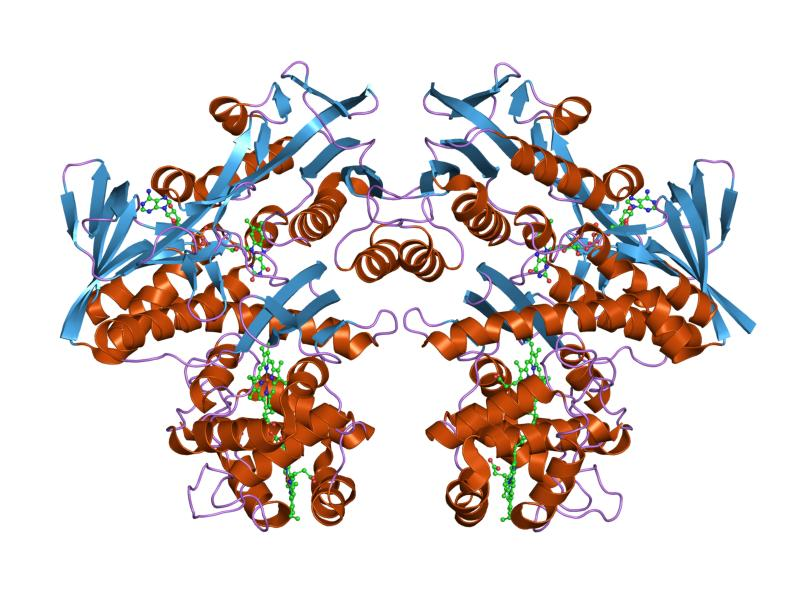
Molecular structure of protein registered with ClpX

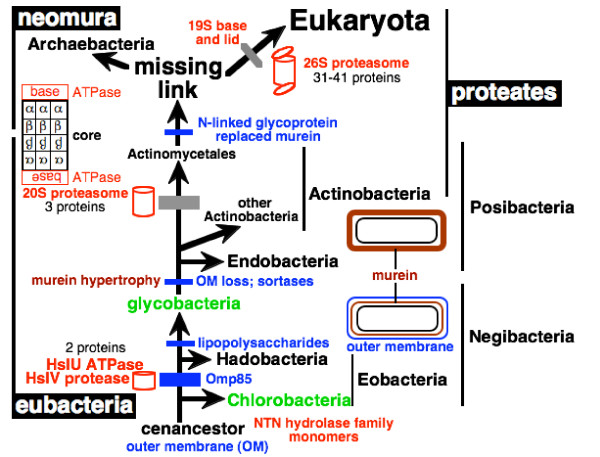
Proteasome evolution showing step-wise increase in complexity.

The Clp proteases have a two-component structure which includes two different proteolytic cores and multiple chaperone rings. As a result, there are several possible combinations of Clp protease complexes. The ClpP protease core can partner with different chaperones, namely ClpA, ClpC, ClpE, and ClpX, to form active chaperone-protease complexes. On the other hand, ClpQ interacts exclusively with the ClpY chaperone to form the ClpYQ protease (also called HslUV) . The Clp-type ATPases can be classified into two distinct groups: class I with two consecutive AAA modules per protomer(ClpA, ClpC, and ClpE) and class II with only one AAA module per protomer.

ClpA and ClpX of E. coli are protein unfoldases that require ATP to function. They individually associate with the ClpP protease to facilitate targeted protein degradation. These variants have inflicted variants interspecific with ClpP.

=== Quaternary ===
The complex assembly of the regulatory subunits of ATP-dependent Clp proteases is induced in the critical role in cellular thermotolerance. There are numerous proteases that are thought to have a bacterial origin. Studies on the protein of E. coli are the main source of information about the human ClpX protein. In E. coli, the ClpX protein monomer has an N-terminal domain and a AAA+ module made up of two AAA+ domains, one larger than the other. Since the prevalence of E.coli is at such a high factor in most people around the world, the constitutive aspect of ClpX showed multiple signs in research of the protease.

Clp protease is made up of ATPase-active chaperone rings and a proteolytic core, two functional units with distinct functions that play a role in cellular thermotolerance. The ClpXP chaperone-protease is present in almost every type of bacteria, commonly found together with the widely distributed Lon and FtsH proteases. Hence, ClpXP is the most prevalent among the Clp.

The HslV rings engage with an unrelated chaperone ATPase called HslU, which also has 6-fold ring symmetry. This is similar to the ClpX chaperone, which it potentially evolved from, and almost all AAA+ ATPase proteins that emerged from a surge of gene duplications prior to the last common ancestor of all life. This allows the assumption that most mammals from the common ancestors between humans and mice were shown to have this relating enzyme. As shown on the infobox gene similarity between a mouse and a human, we can distinctly see its similarities and differences in the Clp protease.

== Function ==
Bacteria use the ATP-dependent ClpX protease for a variety of purposes, including protein quality control, stress tolerance, the production of virulence factors, and binding to protein degradation tags in E.coli. The ATPase component is in charge of substrate recognition, unfolding, and transport into the proteolytic component. The proteolytic component has several serine- or threonine-type active sites that allow for protein hydrolysis. Accordingly, it seems that depending on the physiological circumstances, clpX can either be produced alone or in conjunction with clpP in cells. ClpX and ClpP are two proteins that work together in the ClpXP complex, which is a major protein degradation system in bacteria. ClpX is an ATPase that provides the energy for unfolding and translocating target proteins into the ClpP protease for degradation. ClpP is the protease that cleaves the unfolded target proteins.

The function of the ClpX has several complexity factors that can be seen in the proteasome evolution figure. This shows the evolution of proteasomes that has occurred in a stepwise manner, with increasing complexity over time. The first step was the development of the HslV ring protease, followed by the 20S proteasome, and finally, the 26S proteasome. Grey bars on the evolutionary tree represent the two significant transitions in proteasome structure that are crucial for polarizing the tree. Additionally, four other evolutionary transitions are marked by blue bars that also align with the tree's polarization. The HslV ring protease has 6-fold symmetry, with a 2-tiered ring consisting of 12 identical subunits. It is believed to have arisen from a monomeric NTN hydrolase, possibly just before the divergence of Hadobacteria. The regulation of ClpX and ClpP expression is complex and involves various factors, including transcriptional regulators, environmental signals, and post-transcriptional modifications. Understanding how the expression of these proteins is regulated can provide insights into the mechanisms by which bacteria respond to stress and maintain cellular homeostasis.

== Clinical significance ==
The mitochondrial system responsible for maintaining protein quality, especially clpx, plays a crucial role in influencing fertility, survival, and neural aging. Studies have indicated that improper regulation of the protein quality control system within the mitochondria, which includes the CLPXP complex, can significantly impact cellular health and function. For instance, when researchers deleted the CLPP subunit in mice, they observed a decline in fertility and a rise in early embryonic mortality. These findings suggest that the clpx complex plays a crucial role in maintaining appropriate mitochondrial function during gamete production and embryonic development.

The ClpXP protease is a significant player in mitochondrial protein quality control in mammals. When ClpXP function is compromised, it can result in the accumulation of damaged proteins and mitochondrial malfunctions. These issues are believed to be potential causes of neurodegenerative diseases and aging. Having such a variety of Clp complexes, the insight of the ClpX assembly is crucial to identify any detrimental damages in humans for long term issues or term. Having a common ancestor with mice allows for future studies to be developed in understanding this enzyme.

Through extensive research of E.coli with correlation to ClpXp, research on Mycobacterium tuberculosis took place. The data revealed that ClpX participates in DNA replication and identify the first activator of ClpXp in mycobacteria as well. This knowledge correlates with research of when ClpX is inhibited, the bacterium became more susceptible to antibiotics. This suggests that targeting ClpX could be a strategy for overcoming antibiotic resistance in bacterial infections in this research. However, the research is ongoing and more definitive results are needed to take place.
