= Local Public Planning Council =

Local Public Planning Councils, Local Councils of Public Planning or Consejos Locales de Planificación Pública (CLPP), are institutions of local government in Venezuela as provided by article 182 of the 1999 constitution of Venezuela. They are a subdivision of municipal government that is unitary.

The 335 municipalities in the country are divided into 1,084 civil parishes. The council is presided over by the mayor and consists of municipal council members, chairpersons of parish boards, and representatives of neighborhood organizations and other organized social groups provided by law.

They serve as instruments for community control of local services and resources. Due to government functioning on a majority basis, the coalitions that this entails have hindered effective functioning of the process.

== History ==
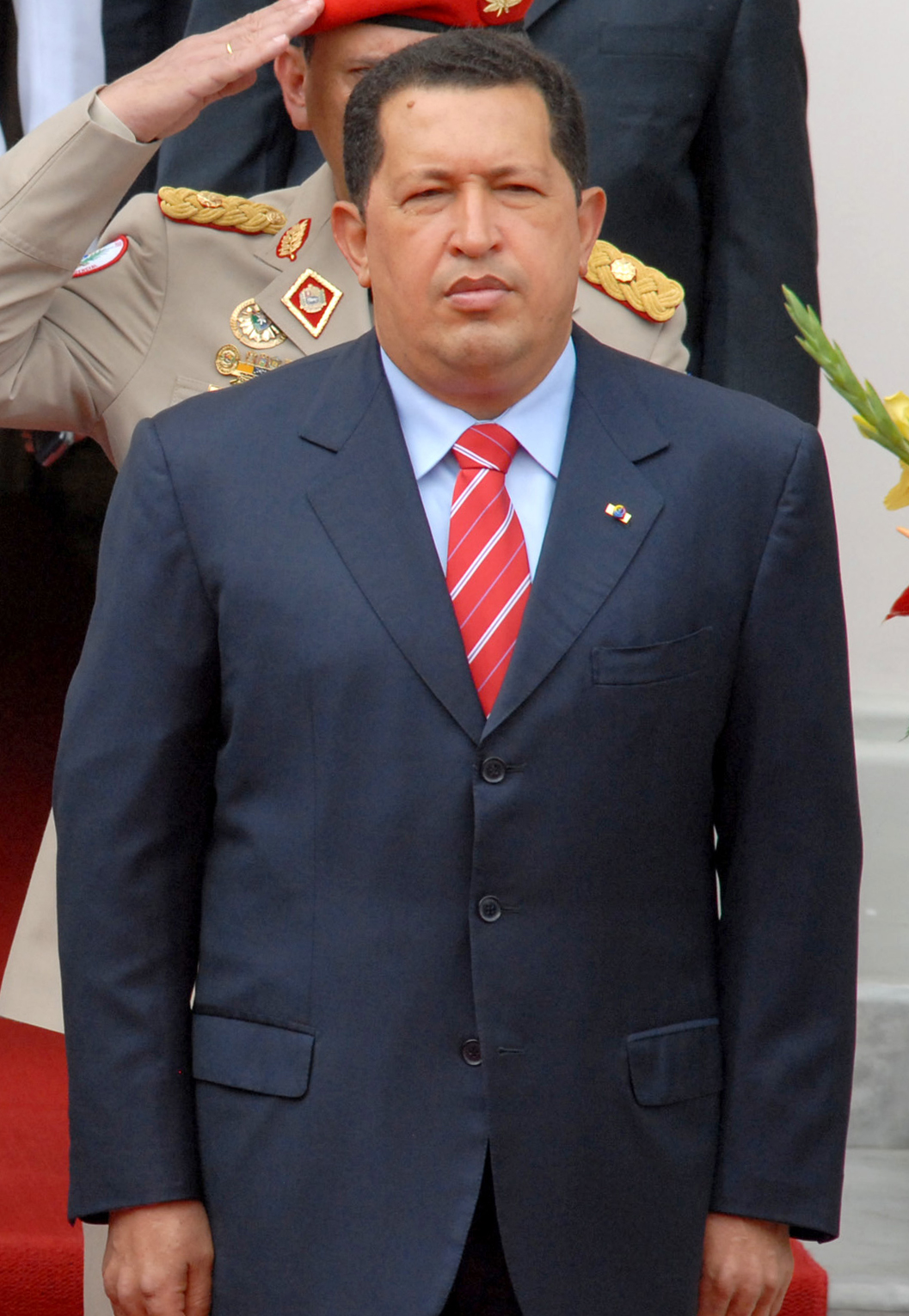
President of Venezuela Hugo Chávez, who enacted the new constitution that enabled the establishment of the CLPPs.

Colonial Venezuela led to the establishment of the 23 states of Venezuela out of the colonial provinces. Since independence in 1821, a variety of states have been merged, culminating in an expansion by three states in the late 1990s. The Federal War of 1859-1863 between the conservatives and liberals led to federalism and hindered devolution as a result of the ensuing caudillismo. A 1969 presidential decree led to the grouping of the states into 10 administrative regions and further consolidated the federal government's authority.
