= ATP-dependent Clp protease proteolytic subunit =

Protein-coding gene in the species Homo sapiens

CLPP
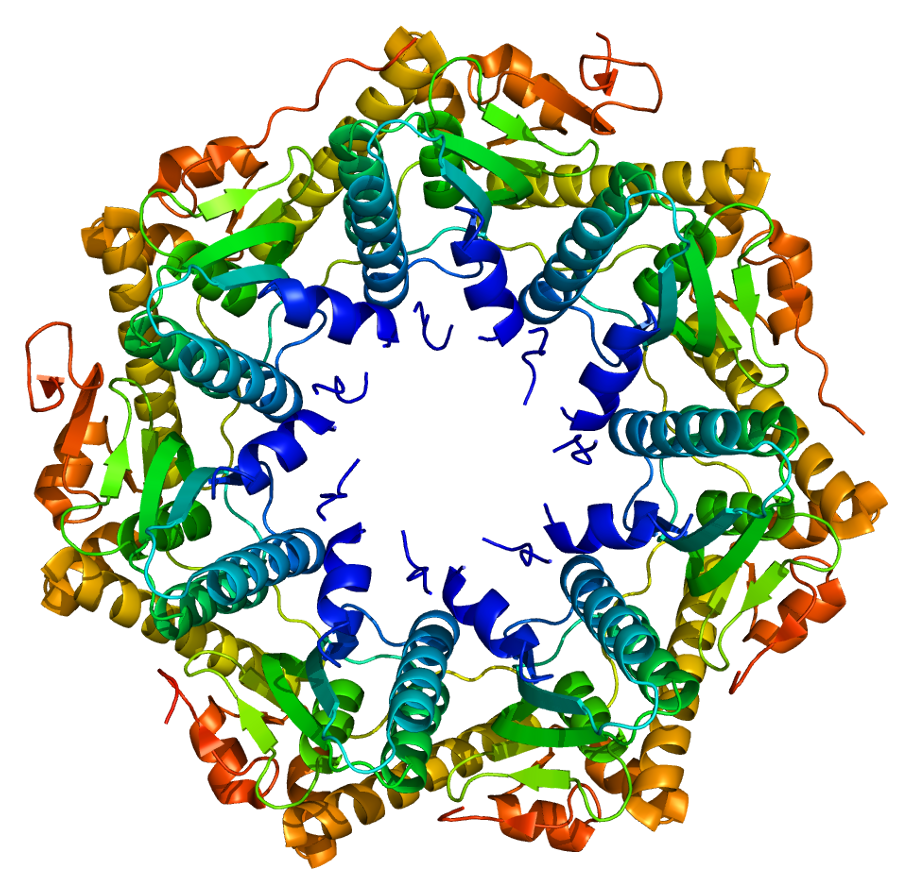

Identifiers
- Aliases: CLPP, PRLTS3, DFNB81, caseinolytic mitochondrial matrix peptidase proteolytic subunit
- External IDs: OMIM: 601119; MGI: 1858213; GeneCards: CLPP
Available structures
PDB	Ortholog search: PDBe RCSB
PDB	List of PDB id codes 1TG6
Enzyme activity
EC #	BRENDA	ExPASy	KEGG	MetaCyc
3.4.21.92	↗	↗	↗	↗

Gene location (Human)
Chr.	Chromosome 19 (human)
Band	19p13.3	Start	6,361,531 bp
Band	19p13.3	End	6,370,242 bp

Gene location (Mouse)
Chr.	Chromosome 17 (mouse)
Band	17 D|17 29.61 cM	Start	57,297,305 bp
Band	17 D|17 29.61 cM	End	57,303,188 bp
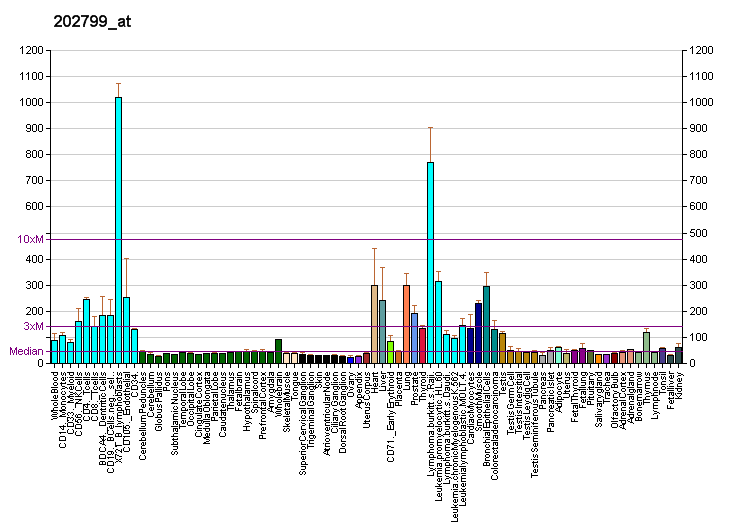
RNA expression pattern
Bgee	Human / Mouse (ortholog); Top expressed in: muscle of thigh; gastrocnemius muscle; mucosa of transverse colon; apex of heart; right adrenal gland; left adrenal gland; right adrenal cortex; right lobe of liver; left adrenal cortex; body of stomach / Top expressed in: interventricular septum; right kidney; facial motor nucleus; morula; morula; condyle; blastocyst; right ventricle; adrenal gland; otic placode; More reference expression data
BioGPS	More reference expression data
Gene ontology
Molecular function	peptidase activity; serine-type peptidase activity; serine-type endopeptidase activity; protein binding; hydrolase activity; identical protein binding; ATP-dependent peptidase activity; ATPase binding
Cellular component	mitochondrial matrix; mitochondrion; endopeptidase Clp complex
Biological process	proteolysis involved in cellular protein catabolic process; protein homooligomerization; proteolysis; protein quality control for misfolded or incompletely synthesized proteins
Sources:Amigo / QuickGO
Orthologs
Databases	NCBI: entry; OMA: entry
Species	Human	Mouse
Entrez	8192	53895
Ensembl	ENSG00000125656	ENSMUSG00000002660
UniProt	Q16740	O88696
RefSeq (mRNA)	NM_006012	NM_017393
RefSeq (protein)	NP_006003	NP_059089
Location (UCSC)	Chr 19: 6.36 – 6.37 Mb	Chr 17: 57.3 – 57.3 Mb
PubMed search
- Wikidata
View/Edit Human	View/Edit Mouse

ATP-dependent Clp protease proteolytic subunit (ClpP) is an enzyme that in humans is encoded by the CLPP gene. This protein is an essential component to form the protein complex of Clp protease (Endopeptidase Clp).

== Structure ==
Enzyme ClpP is a highly conserved serine protease present throughout bacteria and also found in the mitochondria and chloroplasts of eukaryotic cells. The ClpP monomer is folded into three subdomains: the "handle", the globular "head", and the N-terminal region. By itself, ClpP can assemble into a tetradecamer complex (14-members) and form a closed proteolytic chamber. A fully assembled Clp protease complex has a barrel-shaped structure in which two stacked ring of proteolytic subunits (ClpP or ClpQ) are either sandwiched between two rings or single-caped by one ring of ATPase-active chaperon subunits (ClpA, ClpC, ClpE, ClpX or ClpY). ClpXP is presented in almost all bacteria while ClpA is found in the Gram-negative bacteria, ClpC in Gram-Positive bacteria and cyanobacteria. ClpAP, ClpXP and ClpYQ coexist in E. Coli while only ClpXP complex in present in humans.

Some bacteria have multiple ClpPs, like P. aeruginosa, which has two distinct ClpP isoforms ClpP1 and ClpP2. These isoforms have differences in assembly and functional characteristics. P. aeruginosa produces two forms of the ClpP peptidase, PaClpP114 and PaClpP17P27, which in complex with ClpX or ClpA form functional proteases. PaClpP2 is not able to form an active peptidase on its own but it needs PaClpP1 to be active.

== Function ==
In bacteria, it was shown that ClpP is able to cleave full-length proteins without being associated with ClpA but the degradation is at a much slower rate. Fully functional Clp protease requires the participation of AAA+ ATPase. These ClpX chaperons recognize, unfold and transfer protein substrates to proteolytic core formed by ClpP tetradecamer. The proteolytic sites of ClpP subunits contain hydrophobic grooves which recruit substrate and host the catalytic triad Asp-His-Ser. In several bacteria, such as E. coli, proteins tagged with the SsrA peptide (ANDENYALAA) encoded by tmRNA are digested by Clp proteases. Proteases target damaged or misfolded proteins, transcription factors and signaling proteins in bacteria to coordinate complex cell responses and thus they have robust importance for the physiology and virulence of bacteria.

In P. aeruginosa, ClpP1 is expressed constitutively throughout growth whereas ClpP2 expression is induced 10-fold in stationary phase. Quorum-sensing transcription factor LasR activates expression of ClpP2 in stationary phase. ClpP1 and ClpP2 have differential cleavage specificities which contributes to total peptidase activity of PaClpP17P27. Peptidase and protease action of PaClpP17P27 produces cleavage products that enhance biofilm formation in P. aeruginosa.

The protein encoded by this gene belongs to the peptidase family S14 and hydrolyzes proteins into small peptides in the presence of ATP and magnesium. The protein is transported into mitochondrial matrix and is associated with the inner mitochondrial membrane.

== Clinical significance ==
ClpP protease is a major contributor for mitochondrial protein quality control system and removing damaged or misfolded proteins in mitochondrial matrix. Defects in mitochondrial Clp proteases have been associated with the progression of neurodegenerative diseases while upregulation of ClpP proteases has been implicated in preventing premature aging.

Recessive CLPP mutations were recently observed in the human Perrault variant associating with ovarian failure and sensorineural hearing loss, in parallel with growth retardation. The clinical phenotype was accompanied by the accumulation of ClpP associating partner chaperon ClpX, mtRNA, and inflammatory factors. The disease pathological cause probably involves deficient clearance of mitochondrial components and inflammatory tissue destruction.

ClpP has been shown to be over-expressed in the tumour cells of a subset of cancer patients. This can be exploited by therapeutic agents, including by the hyperactivation of ClpP to cause selective cancer cell lethality.

Intracellular proteases have a role in bacterial virulence. Deletion of ClpP causes growth inhibition or loss of virulence in many bacterial species which makes them a good target for developing new antimicrobial agents. Currently there are no approved antimicrobial agents that target bacterial proteases. PaClpP2 is required for proper biofilm development in opportunistic pathogen P. aeruginosa. Deletion of PaClpP2 or mutation of PaClpP2 active site notably decrease biofilm thickness of P. aeruginosa. This founding has relevance in development of new antimicrobial agents against P. aeruginosa.

== See also ==
- CLP protease family
- Endopeptidase Clp
- Protease
- Transfer-messenger RNA
