= Clp protease family =

Protein-targeting ATP-dependent enzyme family

CLP_protease
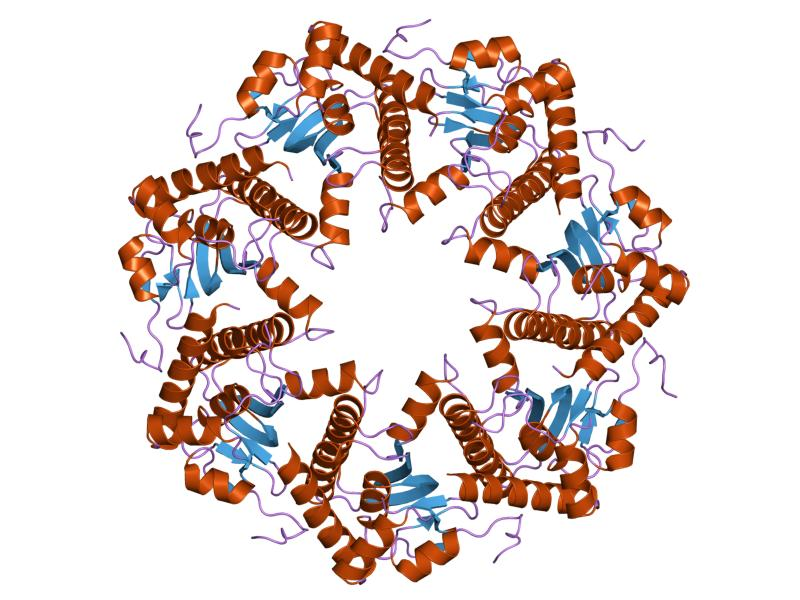
- crystal structure of the clpp protease catalytic domain from plasmodium falciparum

Identifiers
- Symbol: CLP_protease
- Pfam: PF00574
- Pfam clan: CL0127
- InterPro: IPR001907
- PROSITE: PDOC00358
- MEROPS: S14
- SCOP2: 1tyf / SCOPe / SUPFAM
- CDD: cd00394
Available protein structures:
- PDB: IPR001907 PF00574 (ECOD; PDBsum)
- AlphaFold: IPR001907; PF00574

In molecular biology, the CLP protease family is a family of serine peptidases belong to the MEROPS peptidase family S14 (ClpP endopeptidase family, clan SK). ClpP is an ATP-dependent protease that cleaves a number of proteins, such as casein and albumin. It exists as a heterodimer of ATP-binding regulatory A and catalytic P subunits, both of which are required for effective levels of protease activity in the presence of ATP, although the P subunit alone does possess some catalytic activity.

Proteases highly similar to ClpP have been found to be encoded in the genome of bacteria, in the mitochondria of metazoa, some viruses and in the chloroplast of plants. A number of the proteins in this family are classified as non-peptidase homologues as they have been found experimentally to be without peptidase activity, or lack amino acid residues that are believed to be essential for catalytic activity.

Mutations in mitochondrial CLPP are associated with Perrault syndrome and cause a variety of molecular defects, from the loss of ATPase docking, to the activation or inhibition of peptidase activity.

== See also ==
- Endopeptidase Clp
- ATP-dependent Clp protease proteolytic subunit
