= Endopeptidase Clp =

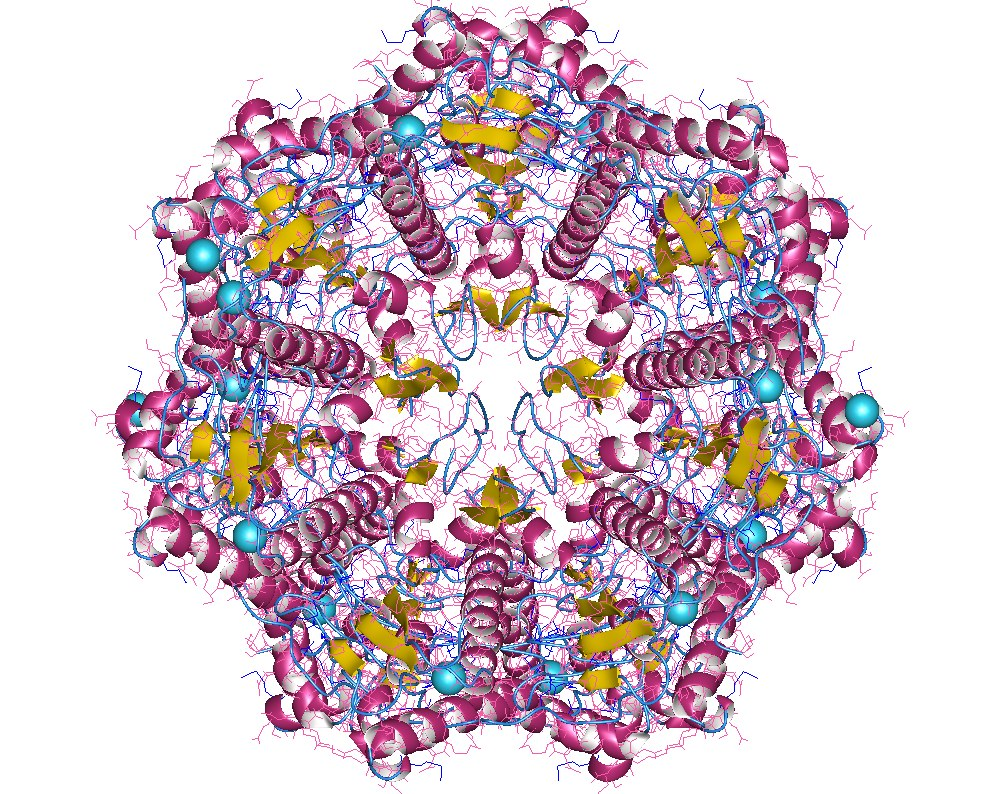
- ATP-dependent Clp protease (fragment) homo14mer, Streptococcus pneumoniae

Identifiers
- EC no.: 3.4.21.92
- CAS no.: 110910-59-3

Databases
- BRENDA: enzyme data
- ExPASy: NiceZyme view
- KEGG: enzyme entry
- MetaCyc: metabolic pathway
- Rhea: reactions
- PDB structures: RCSB PDB PDBe PDBsum
Search
- PMC: articles
- PubMed: articles
- NCBI: proteins

Endopeptidase Clp (EC 3.4.21.92, endopeptidase Ti, caseinolytic protease, protease Ti, ATP-dependent Clp protease, ClpP, Clp protease). This enzyme catalyses the following chemical reaction

Hydrolysis of proteins to small peptides in the presence of ATP and Mg^{2+}.

This bacterial enzyme contains subunits of two types, ClpP, with peptidase activity, and the protein ClpA, with AAA+ ATPase activity. ClpP and ClpA are not evolutionarily related.

A fully assembled Clp protease complex has a barrel-shaped structure in which two stacked heptameric ring of proteolytic subunits (ClpP or ClpQ) are either sandwiched between two rings or single-caped by one ring of hexameric ATPase-active chaperon subunits (ClpA, ClpC, ClpE, ClpX, ClpY, or others).

ClpXP is presented in almost all bacteria while ClpA is found in the Gram-negative bacteria, ClpC in Gram-Positive bacteria and cyanobacteria. ClpAP, ClpXP and ClpYQ coexist in E. coli while only ClpXP complex in present in humans as mitochondrial enzymes. ClpYQ is another name for the HslVU complex, a heat shock protein complex thought to resemble the hypothetical ancestor of the proteasome.

== ATPase ==
ClpA/B

Identifiers
- Symbol: ClpA/B
- Pfam: PF02861
- InterPro: IPR001270
Available protein structures:
- PDB: IPR001270 PF02861 (ECOD; PDBsum)
- AlphaFold: IPR001270; PF02861

ClpX

Identifiers
- Symbol: ClpX
- InterPro: IPR004487
Available protein structures:
- PDB: IPR004487
- AlphaFold: IPR004487

The Hsp100 family of eukaryotic heat shock proteins is homologous to the ATPase-active chaperon subunits found in the Clp complex; as such the entire group is often referred to as the HSP100/Clp family. The family is usually broken into two parts, one being the ClpA/B family with two ATPase domains, and the other being ClpX and friends with only one such domain. ClpA through E is put into the first group along with Hsp78/104, and ClpX and HSIU is put into the second group.

Many of the proteins are not associated with a protease and have functions other than proteolysis. ClpB (human CLPB "Hsp78", yeast Hsp104) break up insoluble protein aggregates in conjunction with DnaK/Hsp70. They are thought to function by threading client proteins through a small 20 Å (2 nm) pore, thereby giving each client protein a second chance to fold. A member of the ClpA/B family termed ClpV is used in the bacterial T6SS.

== See also ==
- Endopeptidase
- CLP protease family
- ATP-dependent Clp protease proteolytic subunit
