= PA clan of proteases =

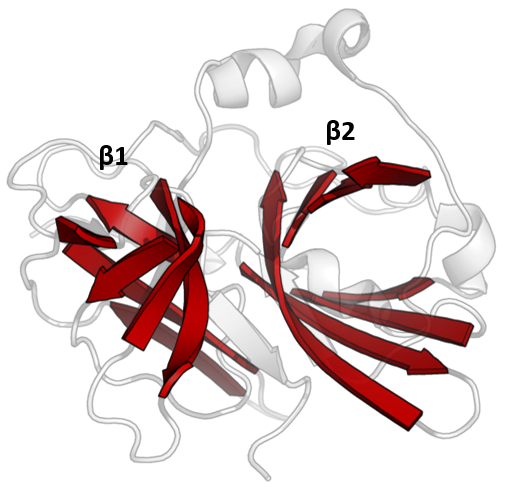
- The double β-barrels that characterise the PA clan are highlighted in red. (TEV protease, PDB: 1lvm)

Identifiers
- Symbol: N/A
- Pfam clan: CL0124
- ECOD: 1.1.5
- InterPro: IPR009003
- SCOP2: 50494 / SCOPe / SUPFAM
- Membranome: 319
Available protein structures:
- PDB: IPR009003
- AlphaFold: IPR009003

The PA clan (Proteases of mixed nucleophile, superfamily A) is the largest group of proteases with common ancestry as identified by structural homology. Members have a chymotrypsin-like fold and similar proteolysis mechanisms but can have identity of <10%. The clan contains both cysteine and serine proteases (different nucleophiles). PA clan proteases can be found in plants, animals, fungi, eubacteria, archaea and viruses.

The common use of the catalytic triad for hydrolysis by multiple clans of proteases, including the PA clan, represents an example of convergent evolution. The differences in the catalytic triad within the PA clan is also an example of divergent evolution of active sites in enzymes.

== History ==
In the 1960s, the sequence similarity of several proteases indicated that they were evolutionarily related. These were grouped into the chymotrypsin-like serine proteases (now called the S1 family). As the structures of these, and other proteases were solved by X-ray crystallography in the 1970s and 80s, it was noticed that several viral proteases such as Tobacco Etch Virus protease showed structural homology despite no discernible sequence similarity and even a different nucleophile. Based on structural homology, a superfamily was defined and later named the PA clan (by the MEROPS classification system). As more structures are solved, more protease families have been added to the PA clan superfamily.

=== Etymology ===
The P refers to Proteases of mixed nucleophile. The A indicates that it was the first such clan to be identified (there also exist the PB, PC, PD and PE clans).

== Structure ==
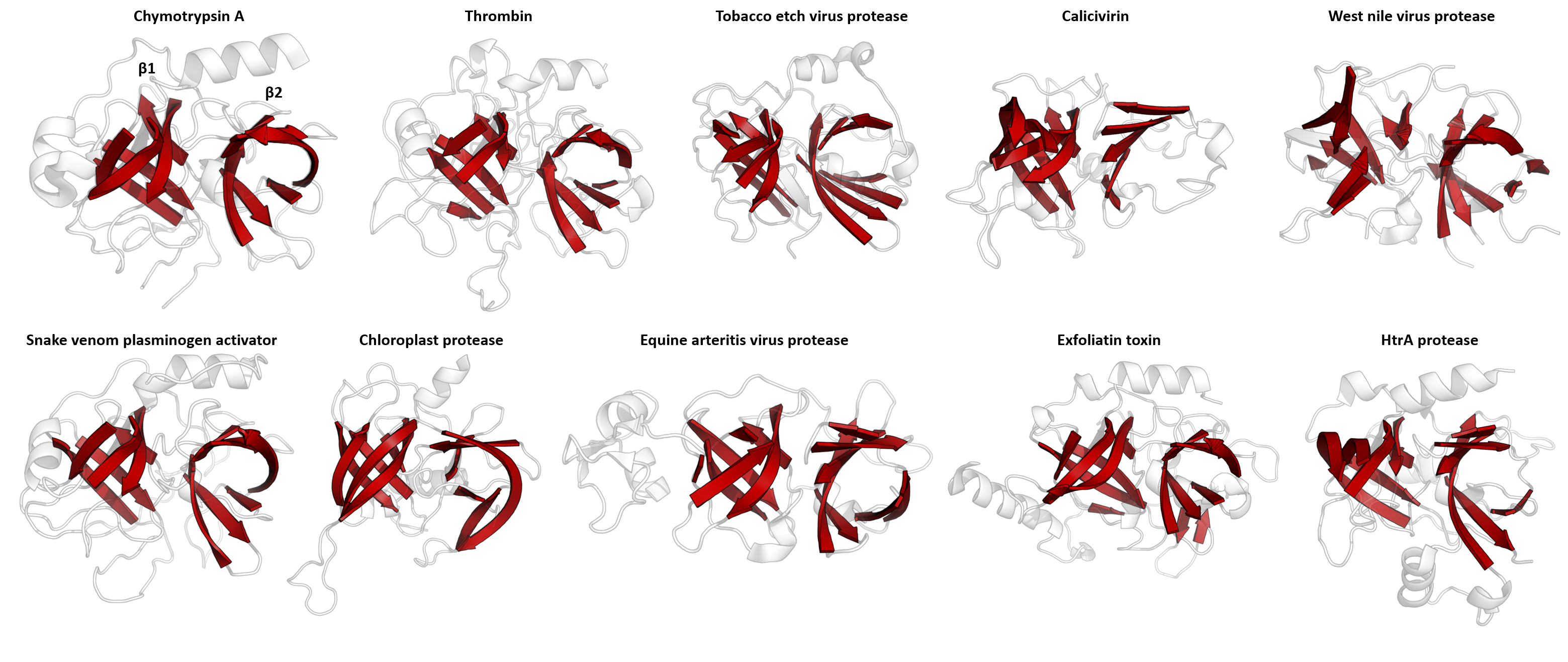
Structural homology in the PA superfamily. The double beta-barrel that characterises the superfamily is highlighted in red. Shown are representative structures from several families within the PA superfamily. Note that some proteins show partially modified structural. Chymotrypsin (PDB: 1gg6), thrombin (PDB: 1mkx), tobacco etch virus protease (PDB: 1lvm), calicivirin (PDB: 1wqs), west nile virus protease (PDB: 1fp7), exfoliatin toxin (PDB: 1exf), HtrA protease (PDB: 1l1j), snake venom plasminogen activator (PDB: 1bqy), chloroplast protease (PDB: 4fln) and equine arteritis virus protease (PDB: 1mbm).
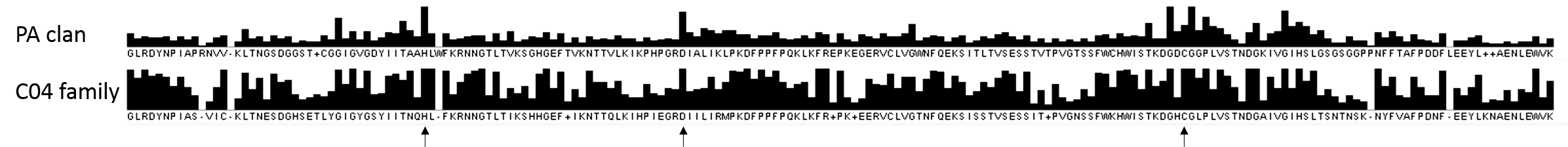
Above, sequence conservation of 250 members of the PA protease clan (superfamily). Below, sequence conservation of 70 members of the C04 protease family. Arrows indicate catalytic triad residues. Aligned on the basis of structure by DALI

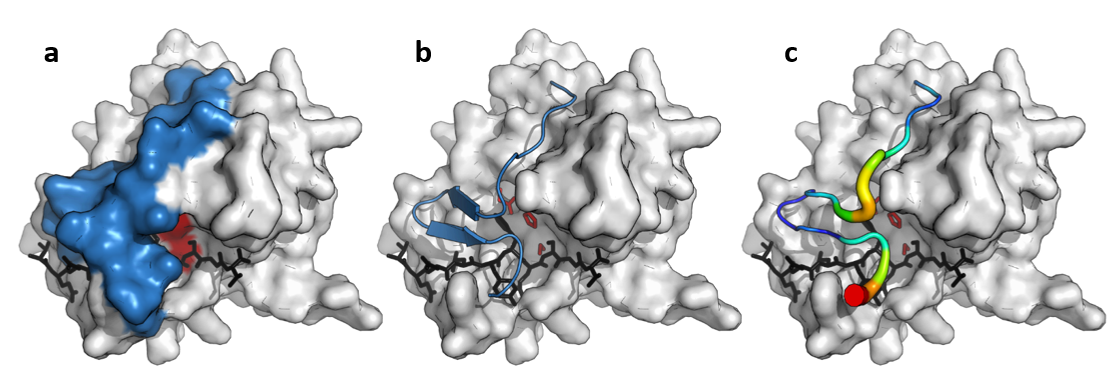
Surface structure of TEV protease. The C-terminal extension only present in viral members of the PA clan of chymotrypsin-like proteases as (a) surface with loop in blue (b) secondary structure and (c) b-factor putty (wider regions indicate greater flexibility) for the structure of TEV protease. Substrate in black, active site triad in red. The final 15 amino acids (222-236) of the enzyme C-terminus are not visible in the structure as they are too flexible. (PDB: 1lvm, 1lvb)

Despite retaining as little as 10% sequence identity, PA clan members isolated from viruses, prokaryotes and eukaryotes show structural homology and can be aligned by structural similarity (e.g. with DALI).

=== Double β-barrel ===
PA clan proteases all share a core motif of two β-barrels with covalent catalysis performed by an acid-histidine-nucleophile catalytic triad motif. The barrels are arranged perpendicularly beside each other with hydrophobic residues holding them together as the core scaffold for the enzyme. The triad residues are split between the two barrels so that catalysis takes place at their interface.

=== Viral protease loop ===
In addition to the double β-barrel core, some viral proteases (such as TEV protease) have a long, flexible C-terminal loop that forms a lid that completely covers the substrate and create a binding tunnel. This tunnel contains a set of tight binding pockets such that each side chain of the substrate peptide (P6 to P1’) is bound in a complementary site (S6 to S1’) and specificity is endowed by the large contact area between enzyme and substrate. Conversely, cellular proteases that lack this loop, such as trypsin have broader specificity.

== Evolution and function ==
=== Catalytic activity ===
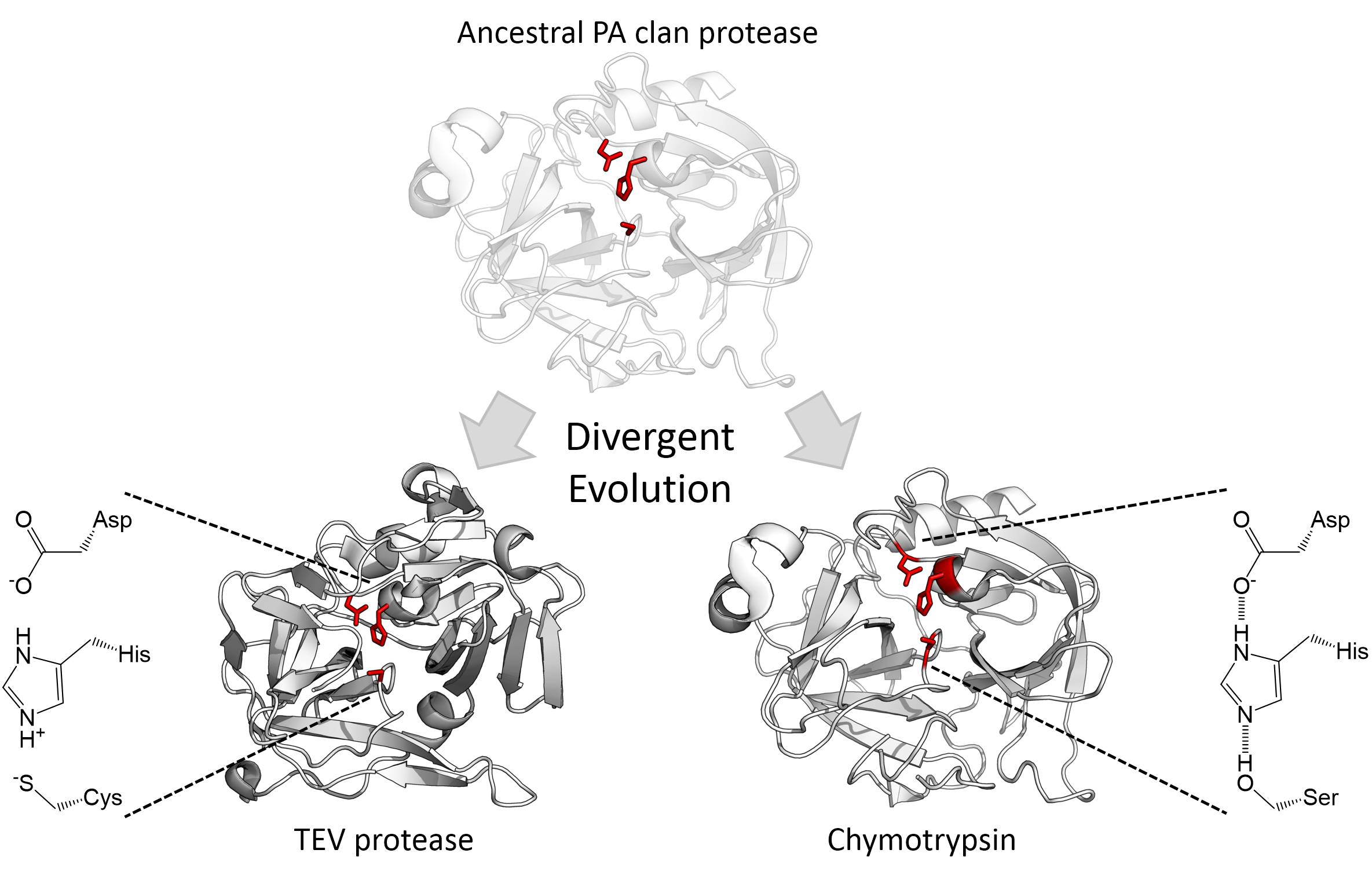
Evolutionary divergence of the catalytic triads to use different nucleophiles. Shown are the serine triad of chymotrypsin (clan PA, family S1) and the cysteine triad of TEV protease (clan PA, family C3).

Structural homology indicates that the PA clan members are descended from a common ancestor of the same fold. Although PA clan proteases use a catalytic triad perform 2-step nucleophilic catalysis, some families use serine as the nucleophile whereas others use cysteine. The superfamily is therefore an extreme example of divergent enzyme evolution since during evolutionary history, the core catalytic residue of the enzyme has switched in different families. In addition to their structural similarity, directed evolution has been shown to be able to convert a cysteine protease into an active serine protease. All cellular PA clan proteases are serine proteases, however there are both serine and cysteine protease families of viral proteases. The majority are endopeptidases, with the exception being the S46 family of exopeptidases.

=== Biological role and substrate specificity ===
In addition to divergence in their core catalytic machinery, the PA clan proteases also show wide divergent evolution in function. Members of the PA clan can be found in eukaryotes, prokaryotes and viruses and encompass a wide range of functions. In mammals, some are involved in blood clotting (e.g. thrombin) and so have high substrate specificity as well as digestion (e.g. trypsin) with broad substrate specificity. Several snake venoms are also PA clan proteases, such as pit viper haemotoxin and interfere with the victim's blood clotting cascade. Additionally, bacteria such as Staphylococcus aureus secrete exfoliative toxin which digest and damage the host's tissues. Many viruses express their genome as a single, massive polyprotein and use a PA clan protease to cleave this into functional units (e.g. polio, norovirus, and TEV proteases).

There are also several pseudoenzymes in the superfamily, where the catalytic triad residues have been mutated and so function as binding proteins. For example, the heparin-binding protein Azurocidin has a glycine in place of the nucleophile and a serine in place of the histidine.

=== Families ===
Within the PA clan (P=proteases of mixed nucleophiles), families are designated by their catalytic nucleophile (C=cysteine proteases, S=serine proteases). Despite the lack of sequence homology for the PA clan as a whole, individual families within it can be identified by sequence similarity.

Family	Examples	Known structure?
C03	polio-type picornain 3C (poliovirus)	Yes
C04	tobacco etch virus protease (tobacco etch virus )	Yes
C24	rabbit hemorrhagic disease virus 3C-like peptidase (rabbit hemorrhagic disease virus)	No
C30	porcine transmissible gastroenteritis virus-type main peptidase (transmissible gastroenteritis virus)	Yes
C37	calicivirin (Southampton virus)	Yes
C62	gill-associated virus 3C-like peptidase (gill-associated virus)	No
C74	pestivirus NS2 peptidase (bovine viral diarrhea virus 1)	No
C99	iflavirus processing peptidase (Ectropis obliqua picorna-like virus)	No
C107	alphamesonivirus 3C-like peptidase (Cavally virus)	No
S01	chymotrypsin A (Bos taurus)	Yes
S03	togavirin (Sindbis virus)	Yes
S06	IgA specific serine endopeptidase (Neisseria gonorrhoeae)	Yes
S07	flavivirin (yellow fever virus)	No
S29	hepacivirin (hepatitis C virus)	Yes
S30	potyvirus P1 peptidase (plum pox virus)	No
S31	pestivirus NS3 polyprotein peptidase (bovine viral diarrhea virus 1)	No
S32	equine arterivirus serine peptidase (equine arteritis virus)	Yes
S39	sobemovirus peptidase (cocksfoot mottle virus)	Yes
S46	dipeptidyl-peptidase 7 (Porphyromonas gingivalis)	No
S55	SpoIVB peptidase (Bacillus subtilis)	No
S64	Ssy5 peptidase (Saccharomyces cerevisiae)	No
S65	picornain-like cysteine peptidase (Breda-1 torovirus)	No
S75	White bream virus serine peptidase (White bream virus)	No

== See also ==
- Protease
  - cysteine-
  - serine-
  - threonine-
  - aspartic-
  - metallo-
- Catalytic triad
- Homology (biology)
- MEROPS
- Protein family
- Protein superfamily
- Protein structure
- Structural alignment
