= Protein superfamily =

Grouping of proteins

A protein superfamily is the largest grouping (clade) of proteins for which common ancestry can be inferred (see homology). Usually this common ancestry is inferred from structural alignment and mechanistic similarity, even if no sequence similarity is evident. Sequence homology can then be deduced even if not apparent (due to low sequence similarity). Superfamilies typically contain several protein families which show sequence similarity within each family. The term protein clan is commonly used for protease and glycosyl hydrolases superfamilies based on the MEROPS and CAZy classification systems.

The term protein fold refers to a similar concept based on structural comparison. In some schemes such as SCOP and CATH it is treated as a level above the superfamily (with common ancestry at the fold level being not as strongly supported as the superfamily level), while other schemes treat them as synonymous. The level beyond the fold is the fold class, which describes a rough topology of the protein (e.g. all-α, all-β, α+β, α/β).

== Identification ==
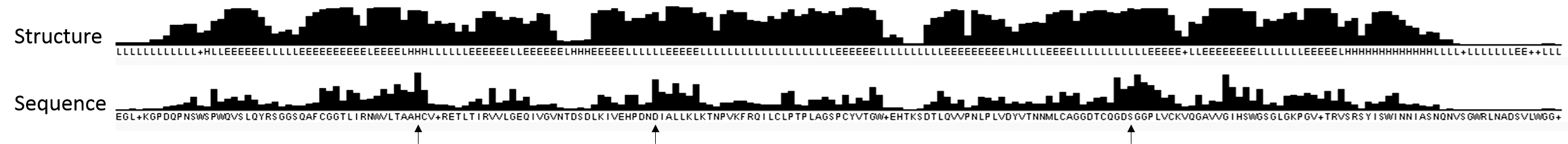
Above, secondary structural conservation of 80 members of the PA protease clan (superfamily). H indicates α-helix, E indicates β-sheet, L indicates loop. Below, sequence conservation for the same alignment. Arrows indicate catalytic triad residues. Aligned on the basis of structure by DALI

Superfamilies of proteins are identified using a number of methods. Closely related members can be identified by different methods to those needed to group the most evolutionarily divergent members.

=== Sequence similarity ===
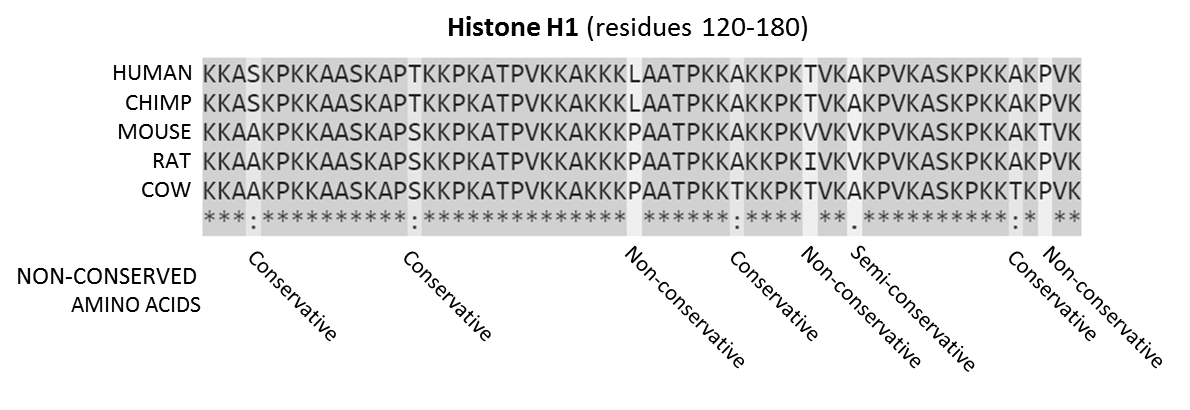
A sequence alignment of mammalian histone proteins. The similarity of the sequences implies that they evolved by gene duplication. Residues that are conserved across all sequences are highlighted in grey. Below the protein sequences is a key denoting: * conserved sequence, : conservative mutations, . semi-conservative mutations, and; ␣ non-conservative mutations.

Historically, the similarity of different amino acid sequences has been the most common method of inferring homology. Sequence similarity is considered a good predictor of relatedness, since similar sequences are more likely the result of gene duplication and divergent evolution, rather than the result of convergent evolution. Amino acid sequence is typically more conserved than DNA sequence (due to the degenerate genetic code), so it is a more sensitive detection method. Since some of the amino acids have similar properties (e.g., charge, hydrophobicity, size), conservative mutations that interchange them are often neutral to function. The most conserved sequence regions of a protein often correspond to functionally important regions like catalytic sites and binding sites, since these regions are less tolerant to sequence changes.

Using sequence similarity to infer homology has several limitations. There is no minimum level of sequence similarity guaranteed to produce identical structures. Over long periods of evolution, related proteins may show no detectable sequence similarity to one another. Sequences with many insertions and deletions can also sometimes be difficult to align and so identify the homologous sequence regions. In the PA clan of proteases, for example, not a single residue is conserved through the superfamily, not even those in the catalytic triad. Conversely, the individual families that make up a superfamily are defined on the basis of their sequence alignment, for example the C04 protease family within the PA clan.

Nevertheless, sequence similarity is the most commonly used form of evidence to infer relatedness, since the number of known sequences vastly outnumbers the number of known tertiary structures. In the absence of structural information, sequence similarity constrains the limits of which proteins can be assigned to a superfamily.

=== Structural similarity ===
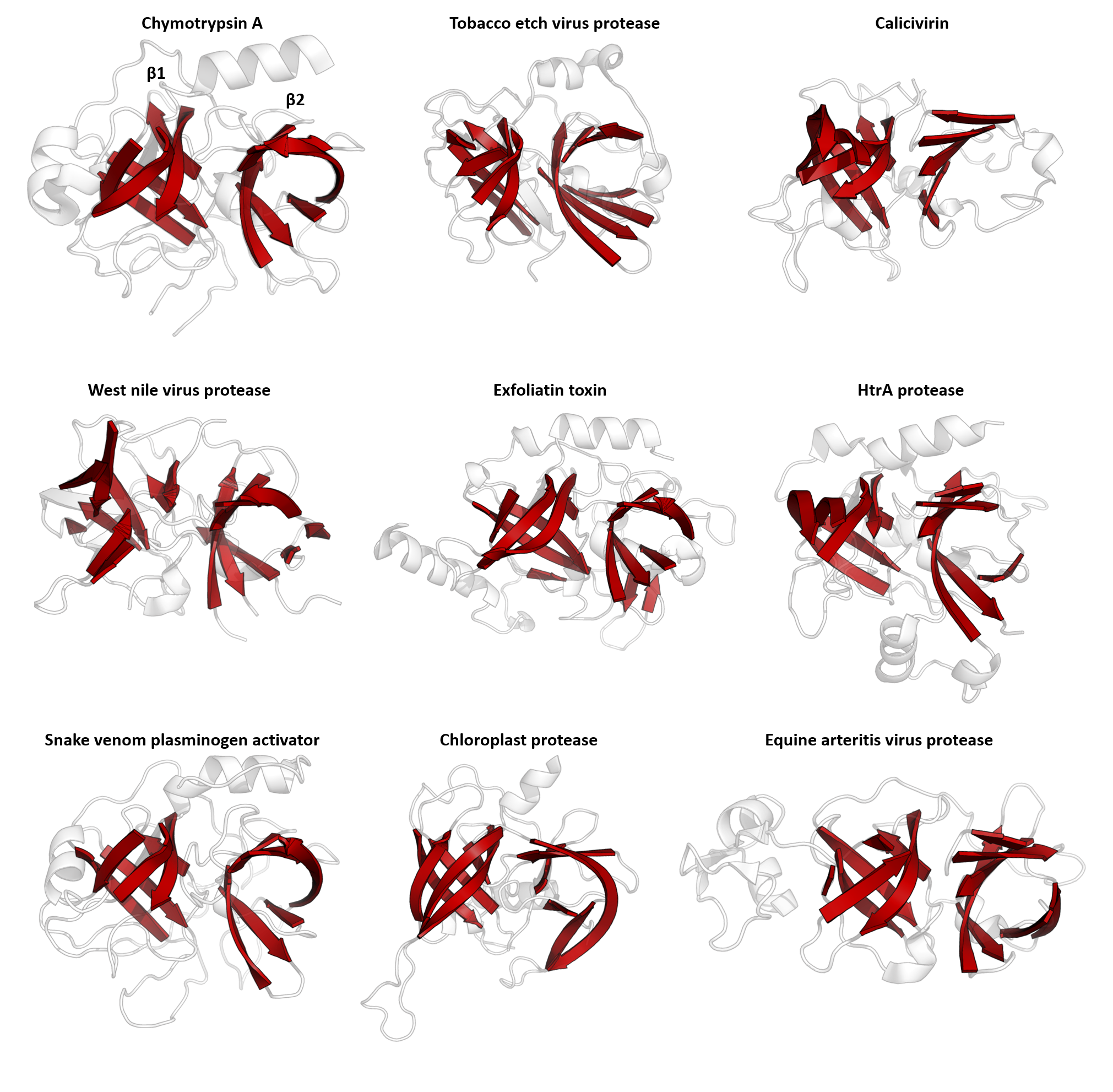
Structural homology in the PA superfamily (PA clan). The double β-barrel that characterises the superfamily is highlighted in red. Shown are representative structures from several families within the PA superfamily. Note that some proteins show partially modified structural. Chymotrypsin (1gg6), tobacco etch virus protease (1lvm), calicivirin (1wqs), west nile virus protease (1fp7), exfoliatin toxin (1exf), HtrA protease (1l1j), snake venom plasminogen activator (1bqy), chloroplast protease (4fln) and equine arteritis virus protease (1mbm).

Structure is much more evolutionarily conserved than sequence, such that proteins with highly similar structures can have entirely different sequences. Over very long evolutionary timescales, very few residues show detectable amino acid sequence conservation, however secondary structural elements and tertiary structural motifs are highly conserved. Some protein dynamics and conformational changes of the protein structure may also be conserved, as is seen in the serpin superfamily. Consequently, protein tertiary structure can be used to detect homology between proteins even when no evidence of relatedness remains in their sequences. Structural alignment programs, such as DALI, use the 3D structure of a protein of interest to find proteins with similar folds. However, on rare occasions, related proteins may evolve to be structurally dissimilar and relatedness can only be inferred by other methods.

=== Mechanistic similarity ===
The catalytic mechanism of enzymes within a superfamily is commonly conserved, although substrate specificity may be significantly different. Catalytic residues also tend to occur in the same order in the protein sequence. For the families within the PA clan of proteases, although there has been divergent evolution of the catalytic triad residues used to perform catalysis, all members use a similar mechanism to perform covalent, nucleophilic catalysis on proteins, peptides or amino acids. However, mechanism alone is not sufficient to infer relatedness. Some catalytic mechanisms have been convergently evolved multiple times independently, and so form separate superfamilies, and in some superfamilies display a range of different (though often chemically similar) mechanisms.

== Evolutionary significance ==
Protein superfamilies represent the current limits of our ability to identify common ancestry. They are the largest evolutionary grouping based on direct evidence that is currently possible. They are therefore amongst the most ancient evolutionary events currently studied. Some superfamilies have members present in all kingdoms of life, indicating that the last common ancestor of that superfamily was in the last universal common ancestor of all life (LUCA).

Superfamily members may be in different species, with the ancestral protein being the form of the protein that existed in the ancestral species (orthology). Conversely, the proteins may be in the same species, but evolved from a single protein whose gene was duplicated in the genome (paralogy).

=== Diversification ===
A majority of proteins contain multiple domains. Between 66 and 80% of eukaryotic proteins have multiple domains while about 40-60% of prokaryotic proteins have multiple domains. Over time, many of the superfamilies of domains have mixed together. In fact, it is very rare to find "consistently isolated superfamilies". When domains do combine, the N- to C-terminal domain order (the "domain architecture") is typically well conserved. Additionally, the number of domain combinations seen in nature is small compared to the number of possibilities, suggesting that selection acts on all combinations.

== Examples ==
α/β hydrolase superfamily
Members share an α/β sheet, containing 8 strands connected by helices, with catalytic triad residues in the same order, activities include proteases, lipases, peroxidases, esterases, epoxide hydrolases and dehalogenases.
Alkaline phosphatase superfamily
Members share an αβα sandwich structure as well as performing common promiscuous reactions by a common mechanism.
Globin superfamily
Members share an 8-alpha helix globular globin fold.
Immunoglobulin superfamily
Members share a sandwich-like structure of two sheets of antiparallel β strands (Ig-fold), and are involved in recognition, binding, and adhesion.
LYRM superfamily
Members share a conserved LYR motif (leucine–tyrosine–arginine) embedded within a three α‑helix structure and function as adaptor proteins essential for mitochondrial Fe–S cluster assembly and oxidative phosphorylation complex assembly.
PA clan
Members share a chymotrypsin-like double β-barrel fold and similar proteolysis mechanisms but sequence identity of <10%. The clan contains both cysteine and serine proteases (different nucleophiles).
Ras superfamily
Members share a common catalytic G domain of a 6-strand β sheet surrounded by 5 α-helices.
RSH superfamily
Members share capability to hydrolyze and/or synthesize ppGpp alarmones in the stringent response.
Serpin superfamily
Members share a high-energy, stressed fold which can undergo a large conformational change, which is typically used to inhibit serine and cysteine proteases by disrupting their structure.
TIM barrel superfamily
Members share a large α_{8}β_{8} barrel structure. It is one of the most common protein folds and the monophylicity of this superfamily is still contested.

== Protein superfamily resources ==
Several biological databases document protein superfamilies and protein folds, for example:

- Pfam - Protein families database of alignments and HMMs
- PROSITE - Database of protein domains, families and functional sites
- PIRSF - SuperFamily Classification System
- PASS2 - Protein Alignment as Structural Superfamilies v2
- SUPERFAMILY - Library of HMMs representing superfamilies and database of (superfamily and family) annotations for all completely sequenced organisms
- SCOP and CATH - Classifications of protein structures into superfamilies, families and domains

Similarly there are algorithms that search the PDB for proteins with structural homology to a target structure, for example:

- DALI - Structural alignment based on a distance alignment matrix method

== See also ==
- Structural alignment
- Protein domains
- Protein family
- Protein subfamily
- Protein mimetic
- Protein structure
- Homology (biology)
- Interolog
- List of gene families
- SUPERFAMILY
- CATH
