= Cyclic di-AMP =

Names
- IUPAC name (1S,6R,8R,9R,10S,15R,17R,18R)-8,17-Bis(6-aminopurin-9-yl)-3,12-dihydroxy-3,12-dioxo-2,4,7,11,13,16-hexaoxa-3λ^{5},12λ^{5}-diphosphatricyclo[13.3.0.0^{6,10}]octadecane-9,18-diol
- Other names 3',5'-cyclic di-AMP; c-di-AMP; c-di-adenosine monophosphate

Identifiers
CAS Number	54447-84-6
3D model (JSmol)	Interactive image
ChEBI	CHEBI:71578
ChemSpider	9333199
PubChem CID	11158091
UNII	WH9B66EIX2
CompTox Dashboard (EPA)	DTXSID201317771
- InChI: InChI=1S/C20H24N10O12P2/c21-15-9-17(25-3-23-15)29(5-27-9)19-11(31)13-7(39-19)1-37-43(33,34)42-14-8(2-38-44(35,36)41-13)40-20(12(14)32)30-6-28-10-16(22)24-4-26-18(10)30/h3-8,11-14,19-20,31-32H,1-2H2,(H,33,34)(H,35,36)(H2,21,23,25)(H2,22,24,26)/t7-,8-,11-,12-,13-,14-,19-,20-/m1/s1 Key: PDXMFTWFFKBFIN-XPWFQUROSA-N
- SMILES: C1[C@@H]2[C@H]([C@H]([C@@H](O2)N3C=NC4=C(N=CN=C43)N)O)OP(=O)(OC[C@@H]5[C@H]([C@H]([C@@H](O5)N6C=NC7=C(N=CN=C76)N)O)OP(=O)(O1)O)O

Properties
Chemical formula	C_{20}H_{24}N_{10}O_{12}P_{2}
Molar mass	658.418 g·mol^{−1}
- Except where otherwise noted, data are given for materials in their standard state (at 25 °C [77 °F], 100 kPa). Infobox references

Cyclic di-AMP (also called c-di-AMP and c-di-adenosine monophosphate) is a second messenger used in signal transduction in bacteria and archaea. It is present in many Gram-positive bacteria, some Gram-negative species, and archaea of the phylum Euryarchaeota.

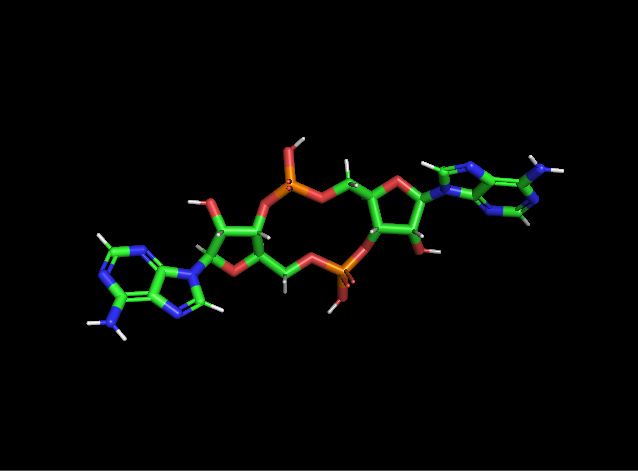
Cyclic di-AMP crystal structure

It is one of many ubiquitous nucleotide second messengers including cyclic adenosine monophosphate (cAMP), cyclic guanosine monophosphate (cGMP), guanosine pentaphosphate ((p)ppGpp), and cyclic di-GMP (c-di-GMP). c-di-AMP is a signaling nucleotide used in signaling pathways that trigger outputs by using receptor or target proteins to sense c-di-AMP concentrations in the cell.

In bacteria, cyclic di-AMP has been implicated in the control of growth, cell wall homeostasis, bacterial biofilm formation and virulence gene expression, heat and osmotic stress regulation and responses, sporulation, potassium transport, lysis, and antibiotic resistance.

In humans, cyclic di-AMP has been implicated in the control of innate immune response and antiviral response against pathogens. The dinucleotide is also produced by numerous human pathogens, prompting the exploration of numerous c-di-AMP-regulating pathways both in humans and in bacteria.

== Synthesis ==
Cyclic di-AMP is synthesized by a membrane-bound diadenylate cyclase (also called diadenylyl cyclase, CdA, and DAC) enzyme called CdaA (DacA). DacA condenses two ATP molecules to make c-di-AMP, releasing 2 pyrophosphates in the process. DacA requires a manganese or cobalt metal ion cofactor. Most bacteria possess only one DAC enzyme, but some bacteria like B. subtilis possess two additional DAC enzymes (DisA and CdaS).

Cyclic di-AMP synthesis is inhibited by the GImM I154F mutation in the Lactococcus lactis bacterium. GImM is the phosphoglucosamine mutase enzyme that interconverts glucosamine-6-phosphate to glucosamine-1-phosphate to later form cell wall peptidoglycan and other polymers. The I154F mutation inhibits CdA activity by binding to it more strongly than wild-type GImM binds. Thus, GImM modulates c-di-AMP levels.

Synthesis is regulated a number of ways, including negative feedback inhibition and upregulation through a decrease in phosphodiesterase.

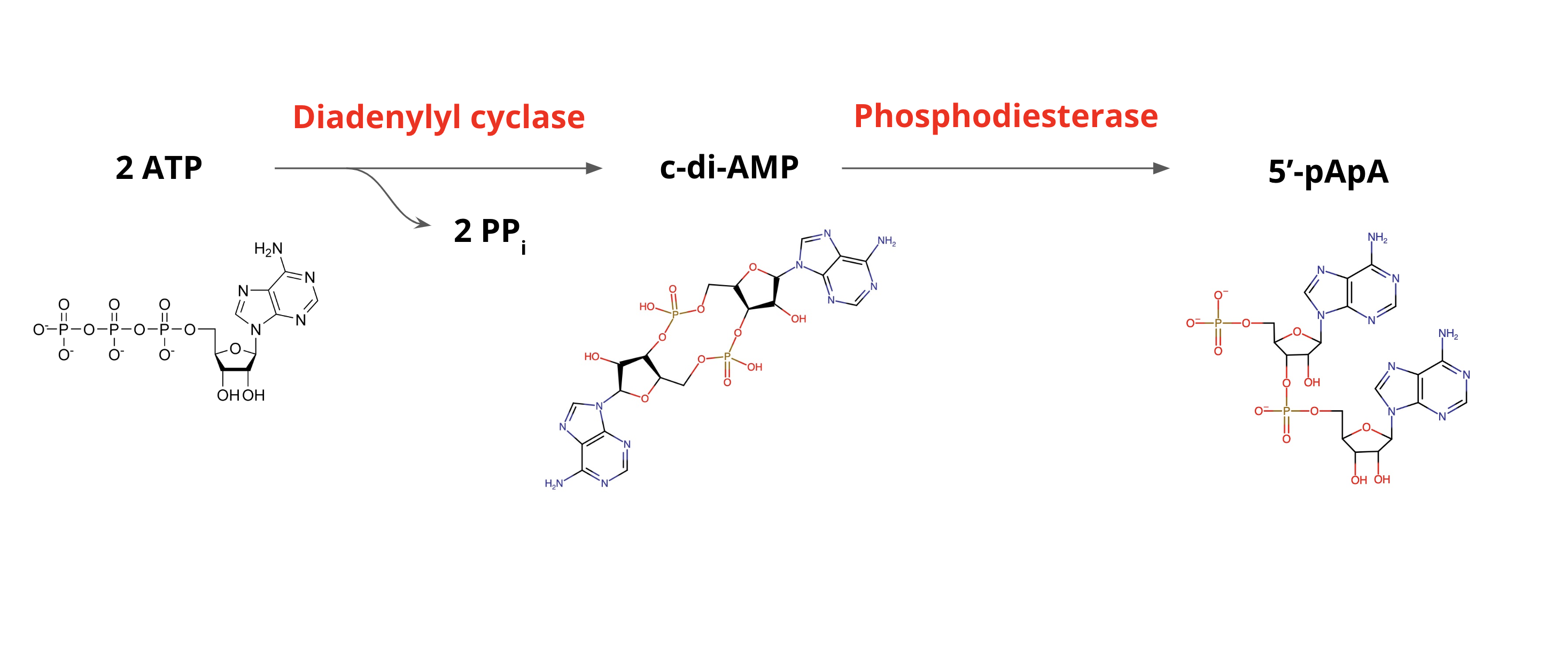
c-di-AMP synthesis and degradation reaction

== Degradation ==
Phosphodiesterase (PDE) enzymes degrade cyclic di-AMP to the linear molecule 5'-pApA (phosphadenylyl adenosine). 5'-pApA is also involved in a feedback inhibition loop that limits GdpP gene-dependent c-di-AMP hydrolysis, leading to elevated c-di-AMP levels.

== Regulation ==
Since cyclic di-AMP is a signaling nucleotide, it is presumed to adhere to the same regulation pathways, where environmental changes are sensed by synthesis or degradation enzymes, which modulate enzyme concentration. Regulation of c-di-AMP is critical because high c-di-AMP levels lead to abnormal physiology, growth defects, and reduced virulence in infection. In some bacteria, loss of the phosphodiesterases that degrade c-di-AMP leads to cell death.

It is possible that in addition to enzymatic regulation, intracellular c-di-AMP levels can be regulated by active transport via multidrug resistance transporters that secrete c-di-AMP from the cytoplasm. Listeria monocytogenes has demonstrated such an effect.

At high concentrations, cyclic di-AMP binds to receptor and target proteins to control specific pathways. Elevated c-di-AMP levels have also been linked to increased resistance toward cell wall-damaging antibiotics (e.g. β-lactams) and reduced cellular turgor.

=== Fatty acid synthesis ===
Cyclic di-AMP has been linked to fatty acid synthesis regulation in Mycobacterium smegmatis, the growth of S. aureus in conditions of low potassium, the sensing of DNA integrity in B. subtilis, and cell wall homeostasis in multiple species.

Cell wall precursor, and thus peptidoglycan precursor, biosynthesis activity can also affect c-di-AMP levels in the cell. Similarly, c-di-AMP levels affect peptidoglycan precursor synthesis, suggesting a strong link between the c-di-AMP and peptidoglycan synthetic pathways.

=== Cell lysis and RNA synthesis ===
It is suggested that cyclic di-AMP is involved in the regulation of cell lysis. Studies have shown that bacterial mutant strains with low c-di-AMP levels lysed significantly faster than their parent strains.

Cyclic di-AMP has also been linked to bacterial RNA synthesis inhibition. c-di-AMP stimulates the production of (p)ppGpp, an alarmone involved in bacterial stringent response.

=== STING pathway ===
In eukaryotic cells, c-di-AMP is sensed and subsequently elicits a type I interferon (IFN) response, leading to the activation of defense mechanisms against viral infection. This detection and activation pathway involves STING, TBK1, and IRF3. c-di-AMP may also stimulate dendritic cells, leading to T cell activation.

c-di-AMP activates the innate immune pathway STING (stimulator of interferon genes) to detect damaged DNA. The nucleotide either binds to the helicase DDX41, which in turn activates the STING pathway, or directly binds to the STING protein. Cyclic di-AMP has been identified (along with 2'3'-cGAMP) as a ligand that induces closing of the STING dimer, leading to STING polymerization and pathway activation. When a type I IFN response is not induced in response to c-di-AMP, STING is unable to relocate from the endoplasmic reticulum to the cytoplasm for pathway activation, suggesting that c-di-AMP is a predominant ligand in STING polymerization, and thus activation, via intracellular translocation.

== See also ==
- Cyclic di-GMP
