= Split TEV =

The split TEV technique is a molecular method to monitor protein-protein interactions in living cells. It is based on the functional reconstitution of two previously inactive fragments derived from the NIa protease of the tobacco etch virus (TEV protease). These fragments, either an N-terminal (NTEV) or C-terminal part (CTEV), are fused to protein interaction partners of choice. Upon interaction of the two candidate proteins, the NTEV and CTEV fragments get into close proximity, regain proteolytic activity, and activate specific TEV reporters which indicate an occurred protein-protein interaction.
