= Nuclear-inclusion-a endopeptidase =

Class of enzymes

Identifiers
- EC no.: 3.4.22.44
- CAS no.: 139946-51-3

Databases
- IntEnz: IntEnz view
- BRENDA: BRENDA entry
- ExPASy: NiceZyme view
- KEGG: KEGG entry
- MetaCyc: metabolic pathway
- PRIAM: profile
- PDB structures: RCSB PDB PDBe PDBsum
Search
- PMC: articles
- PubMed: articles
- NCBI: proteins

Nuclear-inclusion-a endopeptidase (EC 3.4.22.44, potyvirus NIa protease) is a protease enzyme found in potyviruses. This enzyme catalyses the following chemical reaction:

Hydrolyses glutaminyl bonds, and activity is further restricted by preferences for the amino acids in P6 - P1' that vary with the species of potyvirus.
e.g. Glu-Xaa-Xaa-Tyr-Xaa-Gln \ (Ser or Gly) for the enzyme from tobacco etch virus.

The enzyme is used encoded in vectors for the artificial expression of recombinant fusion proteins (see TEV protease).
