= Spot =

Spot or SPOT may refer to:

== Places ==
- The Spot, New South Wales, a locality in Sydney, Australia
- South Pole Traverse, sometimes called the South Pole Overland Traverse
- The Spot (food hall), a food hall in Rockville, Maryland serving Asian fusion cuisine

== People ==
- Spot Collins (1922-1996), American football player and coach
- Jack Comer (1912–1996), Polish-born English gangster nicknamed "Spot"
- Jerry Chamberlain (known as "Spot"), the guitarist for the rock group the Swirling Eddies
- Scott Draves (known as "Spot"), digital artist and VJ
- Spot (producer), Glenn Michael Lockett (1951–2023), house producer and engineer for the label SST Records
- Spot (rapper) (born 1987), American rapper
- Moondog Spot, a ring name for professional wrestler Larry Booker

== Advertising ==
- Radio spot, an over-the-air advertisement
- TV spot, a televised advertisement
- Underwriting spot, an announcement made on public broadcasting outlets, especially in the United States, in exchange for funding

== Animals ==
- Spot, a dog that remained faithful after his master's death, described in the List of individual dogs
- Spot Fetcher, a dog owned by U.S. President George W. Bush

== Arts and entertainment ==
=== Fictional characters ===
- Spot, a character in the 2015 Disney/Pixar animated film The Good Dinosaur
- Spot (chicken), in 101 Dalmatians: The Series
- Spot (Marvel Comics), a Spider-Man villain
- Spot (franchise), the titular puppy in a series of children's books and animated television shows created by Eric Hill
- Spot (Star Trek), a pet cat in Star Trek: The Next Generation
- Scott "Spot", a were-terrier in the comic series iZombie
- Spot, a pet dog in the Dick and Jane textbook series
- Spot, a cat in the cartoon series Hong Kong Phooey
- Spot, a pet dog from the William Joyce series Rolie Polie Olie
- Spot, a pet amoeba in the animated series SpongeBob SquarePants season 11
- Spot, a deity in a sketch by Canadian comedy troupe The Kids In The Hall
- Spot, a pet dragon in the TV series The Munsters
- Spot, Dairine's sentient computer in the Young Wizards series
- Spot, a dog in the Isle of Dogs movie
- Spot, the monster in the comic series Stanley and His Monster
- Spot Helperman, the main protagonist in Disney animated series Teacher's Pet (TV series)
- Spot Splatter Splash, a Lalaloopsy doll and character in the TV series

=== Entertainment ===
- "The Spot", a branding used by several independent television stations owned by the E. W. Scripps Company, which include:
  - KASW in Phoenix, Arizona
  - KCDO-TV in Sterling, Colorado
  - KIVI-DT2 in Nampa, Idaho
  - KMCC in Laughlin, Nevada
  - KMCI-TV in Lawrence, Kansas
  - KUPX-TV in Provo, Utah
  - KWBA-TV in Sierra Vista, Arizona
  - Montana Television Network
  - WACY-TV in Appleton, Wisconsin
  - WGNT in Portsmouth, Virginia
  - WHDT in Stuart, Florida
  - WMYD in Detroit, Michigan
  - WNPX-TV in Franklin, Tennessee
  - WSFL-TV in Miami, Florida
  - WXMI-DT2 in Grand Rapids, Michigan
  - WXPX-TV in Bradenton, Florida
- The Spot (web series), a 1995 Internet soap opera
- The Spot (TV series), an upcoming psychological thriller television series

=== Music ===
- Spot (album), by the synth-pop band And One
- "Spot!", a song by Zico featuring Jennie
- Spot (music festival), a music festival held in Denmark
- "Sex Pistols On Tour Secretly" or SPOTS, a name the Sex Pistols toured under in the United Kingdom

== Biology and healthcare ==
- Spot (fish), a fish (Leiostomus xanthurus)
- SpoT, a bacterial protein that hydrolizes (p)ppGpp
- Another term for a pimple

== Brands and enterprises ==
- SPoT Coffee, a coffee chain
- Spotify (NYSE: SPOT), Swedish media company
- Spot, a mascot for 7 Up soft drinks
- Spot.ph, a website operated by the Philippine company Summit Media

== Technology ==
- SPOT (satellite) (Satellite Pour l'Observation de la Terre), an Earth-observing satellite family
- Single Point of Truth or SPOT, a principle aimed at reducing duplication in software engineering
- Smart Personal Objects Technology or SPOT, a Microsoft initiative
- SPOT Satellite Messenger, a GPS tracking device
- Spot, a four-legged canine-inspired robot made by Boston Dynamics
- Spot, a 3D test model of a cow

== Other meanings ==
- USS Spot, an American World War II submarine later sold to Chile and renamed
- Spot (professional wrestling), a pre-planned wrestling move or series of moves
- SPOT (TSA program), or "Screening of Passengers by Observation Techniques", an airport security technique
- Spotlight, called spot for short
- Spot, American slang for a music venue or club
- Spot, old Australian and New Zealand slang for one hundred dollars
- Spots (cannabis), a method of smoking cannabis, often called hotknifing in the United States

== See also ==
- Spotz (disambiguation)
