= ATP adenylyltransferase =

Class of enzymes

Identifiers
- EC no.: 2.7.7.53
- CAS no.: 96697-71-1

Databases
- IntEnz: IntEnz view
- BRENDA: BRENDA entry
- ExPASy: NiceZyme view
- KEGG: KEGG entry
- MetaCyc: metabolic pathway
- PRIAM: profile
- PDB structures: RCSB PDB PDBe PDBsum
- Gene Ontology: AmiGO / QuickGO
Search
- PMC: articles
- PubMed: articles
- NCBI: proteins

ATP adenylyltransferase (EC 2.7.7.53) is an enzyme that catalyzes the chemical reaction:

adenosine diphosphate
+
adenosine triphosphate
P_{i}
Ap4A

The enzyme characterised from Saccharomyces cerevisiae and Myxococcus xanthus combines adenosine triphosphate and adenosine triphosphate to give Ap4A, with orthophosphate (P_{i}) as a byproduct. Ap4A has been suggested to be an alarmone, a compound produced when an organism is damaged or exposed to heat stress.

This enzyme is a transferase, specifically one transferring phosphorus-containing nucleotide groups (nucleotidyltransferases). The systematic name of this enzyme class is ADP:ATP adenylyltransferase. Other names in common use include bis(5'-nucleosyl)-tetraphosphate phosphorylase (NDP-forming), diadenosinetetraphosphate alphabeta-phosphorylase, adenine triphosphate adenylyltransferase, diadenosine 5',5'"-P1,P4-tetraphosphate alphabeta-phosphorylase, (ADP-forming), and dinucleoside oligophosphate alphabeta-phosphorylase.
