= Protein subfamily =

Protein subfamily is a level of protein classification, based on their close evolutionary relationship. It is below the larger levels of protein superfamily and protein family.

Proteins typically share greater sequence and function similarities with other subfamily members than they do with members of their wider family. For example, in the Structural Classification of Proteins database classification system, members of a subfamily share the same interaction interfaces and interaction partners. These are stricter criteria than for a family, where members have similar structures, but may be more distantly related and so have different interfaces. Subfamilies are assigned by a variety of methods, including sequence similarity, motifs linked to function, or phylogenetic clade. There is no exact and consistent distinction between a subfamily and a family. The same group of proteins may sometimes be described as a family or a subfamily, depending on the context.
