= C20orf96 =

Protein-coding gene in humans

Identifiers
- Aliases: C20orf96, dJ1103G7.2, chromosome 20 open reading frame 96
- External IDs: MGI: 3045333; GeneCards: C20orf96

Gene location (Human)
Chr.	Chromosome 20 (human)
Band	20p13	Start	270,863 bp
Band	20p13	End	290,778 bp

Gene location (Mouse)
Chr.	Chromosome 2 (mouse)
Band	2|2 H1	Start	152,257,507 bp
Band	2|2 H1	End	152,286,250 bp
RNA expression pattern
Bgee	Human / Mouse (ortholog); Top expressed in: right uterine tube; olfactory zone of nasal mucosa; left testis; right testis; anterior pituitary; right ovary; left ovary; mucosa of transverse colon; left lobe of thyroid gland; right lobe of thyroid gland / Top expressed in: spermatid; spermatocyte; seminiferous tubule; lumbar subsegment of spinal cord; embryo; zygote; olfactory epithelium; morula; secondary oocyte; Epithelium of choroid plexus; More reference expression data
BioGPS	n/a
Orthologs
Databases	NCBI: entry; OMA: entry
Species	Human	Mouse
Entrez	140680	228778
Ensembl	ENSG00000196476	ENSMUSG00000032680
UniProt	Q9NUD7	n/a
RefSeq (mRNA)	NM_080571; NM_153269	NM_001289738; NM_177656; NM_001379452
RefSeq (protein)	NP_542138; NP_695001	n/a
Location (UCSC)	Chr 20: 0.27 – 0.29 Mb	Chr 2: 152.26 – 152.29 Mb
PubMed search
- Wikidata
View/Edit Human	View/Edit Mouse

Uncharacterized protein C20orf96 is a protein that in humans is encoded by the gene C20orf96. This protein is predicted to be a nuclear protein. The function and biological processes of the gene is not well understood by the scientific community yet.

== Gene aliases ==
C20orf96 is also known by the alias DJ1103G7.2. Orthologs found in other organisms are known as C20orf96 homolog isoform X [Species].

== Gene ==
=== Location ===
C20orf96 is located on the short arm of chromosome 20 at 20p13, base pairs 270,863 to 290,778 on the complementary strand. It is a member of the DUF4618 superfamily, with the DUF position being from amino acid 104 to 363. Neighboring genes are DEFB129, DEFB132, ZCCHC3, and NRSN2-AS1.

Location of C20orf96 as well as neighboring genes, as given by NCBI Gene

=== Expression ===
Aceview states that the gene is expressed 2.2 times the amount an average gene is expressed, and the sequence has been seen in the brain, testis, uterus, kidney, thymus, breast, kidney tumor, and 84 other places. C20orf96 has been found to bind to transcription factor binding sites AREB6, GATA-1, GATA-2, GATA-3, ATF6, c-Myc, Max, CHOP-10, AMLa, and C/EBPalpha. TYW5 and ALOXE3 are two proteins that interact with C20orf96. TYW5 is a protein coding gene and also incorporates tRNA modification in the nucleus. ALOXE3 is also a protein coding gene, more focusing on Prostaglandin 2 biosynthesis.

== mRNA ==
=== Alternative splicing ===
C20orf96 can be split up into five different variants. All variants code for similar proteins. The variant used for this article was Variant 1. The splicing is shown below.

Exon	Exon Size (bp)
1	18
2	48
3	117
4	117
5	159
6	99
7	156
8	102
9	171
10	117
11	60

== Protein ==
=== General properties ===
The protein made by C20orf96 is 363 amino acids in length. The predicted molecular weight is 42.9 kdal, and the isoelectric point is 8.99.

=== Composition ===
The ratios of this protein are similar to others. The unusual amounts of amino acids are found as alanine, glutamic acid, glycine, and glutamine. Glutamic acid and glutamine both have a slightly larger amount than normal, alanine is slightly below normal, and glycine is low compared to other proteins.

A- : 13( 3.6%)	C  :  4( 1.1%)	D  : 15( 4.1%)	E+ : 38(10.5%)	F  : 10( 2.8%)
G--:  4( 1.1%)	H  :  9( 2.5%)	I  : 17( 4.7%)	K  : 34( 9.4%)	L  : 40(11.0%)
M  : 13( 3.6%)	N  : 10( 2.8%)	P  : 19( 5.2%)	Q+ : 35( 9.6%)	R  : 24( 6.6%)
S  : 25( 6.9%)	T  : 21( 5.8%)	V  : 22( 6.1%)	W  :  4( 1.1%)	Y  :  6( 1.7%)

C20orf96 has a neutral charge, with no additional positive, negative, or mixed charge clusters.

=== Post-translational modification ===
NetPhos predicts 10 serine sites, 4 threonine sites, and 3 tyrosine sites over the 363 amino acids. No signal peptides were detected. There were also no transmembrane sequences.

=== Secondary structure ===
Most of the structure is made up of alpha-helices, with short coils on both ends. At the end of the sequence, there is also a small, four amino acid beta-strand.

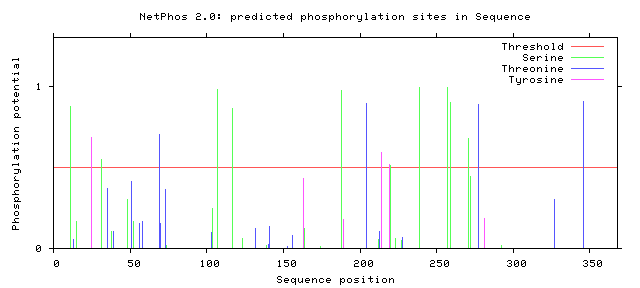

=== Tertiary structure ===
There are no known crystal structures for this protein. The tertiary structure is mainly composed of coiled-coil regions.

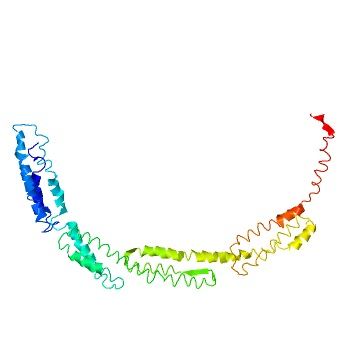

== Homology ==
C20orf96 is found in many eukaryotes. Orthologs have been found in most organisms in the kingdom animalia, with the lineage going back to the phylum Chordata. No paralogs for C20orf96 have been found.

== Mutations ==
The most prevalent mutations of C20orf96 in humans are M1V, Q6K, T13I, T13S, M94I, S117G, S117T, S117N, L142V, D159N, M215T, D238E, R251C, R251G, Q263E, R279C, E304G, I305F, M313I, R328W, R342I, and L353V. The format these mutations are given in are the amino acid that is supposed to be there, the amino acid number, and then the mutation.

== Connection to diseases ==
C20orf96 has been linked to Moyamoya Disease, increasing the odds of contracting the disease by 4.5 times. A study found that C20orf96 has shown positive selection for containing a hub gene, which is a gene that is ranked in the top 20 for connectivity.
