= Htra =

Term Htra may refer to:

- High time-resolution astrophysics, a section of astronomy/astrophysics
- Peptidase Do, an enzyme
