= Protein family =

Group of evolutionarily-related proteins

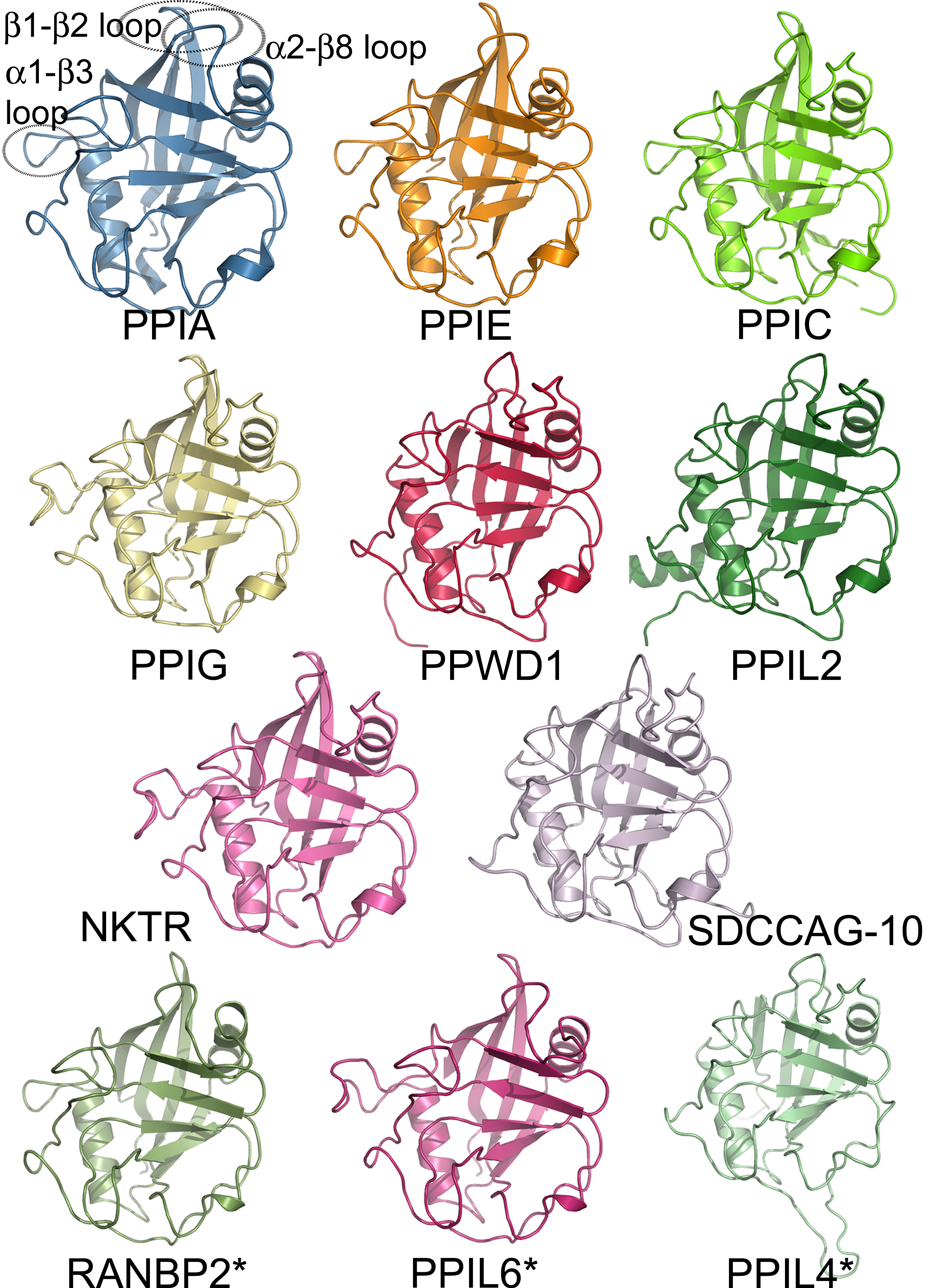
The human cyclophilin family, as represented by the structures of the isomerase domains of some of its members

A protein family is a group of evolutionarily related proteins. In many cases, a protein family has a corresponding gene family, in which each gene encodes a corresponding protein with a 1:1 relationship. The term "protein family" should not be confused with family as it is used in taxonomy.

Proteins in a family descend from a common ancestor and typically have similar three-dimensional structures, functions, and significant sequence similarity. Sequence similarity (usually amino-acid sequence) is one of the most common indicators of homology, or common evolutionary ancestry. Some frameworks for evaluating the significance of similarity between sequences use sequence alignment methods. Proteins that do not share a common ancestor are unlikely to show statistically significant sequence similarity, making sequence alignment a powerful tool for identifying the members of protein families. Families are sometimes grouped together into larger clades called superfamilies based on structural similarity, even if there is no identifiable sequence homology.

Currently, over 60,000 protein families have been defined, although ambiguity in the definition of "protein family" leads different researchers to highly varying numbers.

== Terminology and usage ==
The term protein family has broad usage and can be applied to large groups of proteins with barely detectable sequence similarity as well as narrow groups of proteins with near identical sequence, function, and structure. To distinguish between these cases, a hierarchical terminology is in use. At the highest level of classification are protein superfamilies, which group distantly related proteins, often based on their structural similarity. Next are protein families, which refer to proteins with a shared evolutionary origin exhibited by significant sequence similarity. Subfamilies can be defined within families to denote closely related proteins that have similar or identical functions. For example, a superfamily like the PA clan of proteases has less sequence conservation than the C04 family within it.

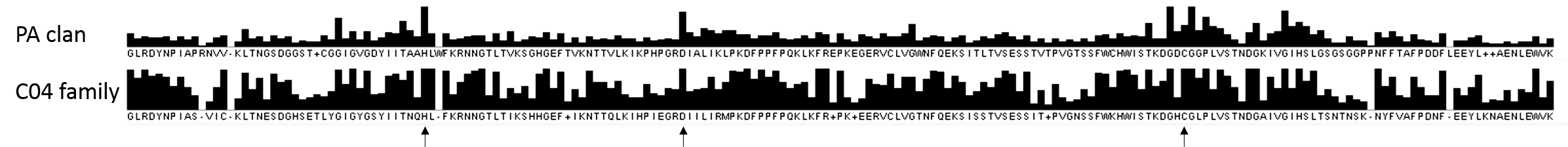
Above, sequence conservation of 250 members of the PA clan proteases (superfamily). Below, sequence conservation of 70 members of the C04 protease family: Arrows indicate catalytic triad residues, aligned on the basis of structure by DALI.

== Protein domains and motifs ==
Protein families were first recognised when most proteins that were structurally understood were small, single-domain proteins such as myoglobin, hemoglobin, and cytochrome c. Since then, many proteins have been found with multiple independent structural and functional units called domains. Due to evolutionary shuffling, different domains in a protein have evolved independently. This has led to a focus on families of protein domains. Several online resources are devoted to identifying and cataloging these domains.

Different regions of a protein have differing functional constraints. For example, the active site of an enzyme requires certain amino-acid residues to be precisely oriented. A protein–protein binding interface may consist of a large surface with constraints on the hydrophobicity or polarity of the amino-acid residues. Functionally constrained regions of proteins evolve more slowly than unconstrained regions such as surface loops, giving rise to blocks of conserved sequence when the sequences of a protein family are compared (see multiple sequence alignment). These blocks are most commonly referred to as motifs, although many other terms are used (blocks, signatures, fingerprints, etc.). Several online resources are devoted to identifying and cataloging protein motifs.

== Evolution of protein families ==
According to current consensus, protein families arise in two ways. First, the separation of a parent species into two genetically isolated descendant species allows a gene/protein to independently accumulate variations (mutations) in these two lineages. This results in a family of orthologous proteins, usually with conserved sequence motifs. Second, a gene duplication may create a second copy of a gene (termed a paralog). Because the original gene is still able to perform its function, the duplicated gene is free to diverge and may acquire new functions (by random mutation).

Certain gene/protein families, especially in eukaryotes, undergo extreme expansions and contractions in the course of evolution, sometimes in concert with whole genome duplications. Expansions are less likely, and losses more likely, for intrinsically disordered proteins and for protein domains whose hydrophobic amino acids are further from the optimal degree of dispersion along the primary sequence. This expansion and contraction of protein families is one of the salient features of genome evolution, but its importance and ramifications are currently unclear.

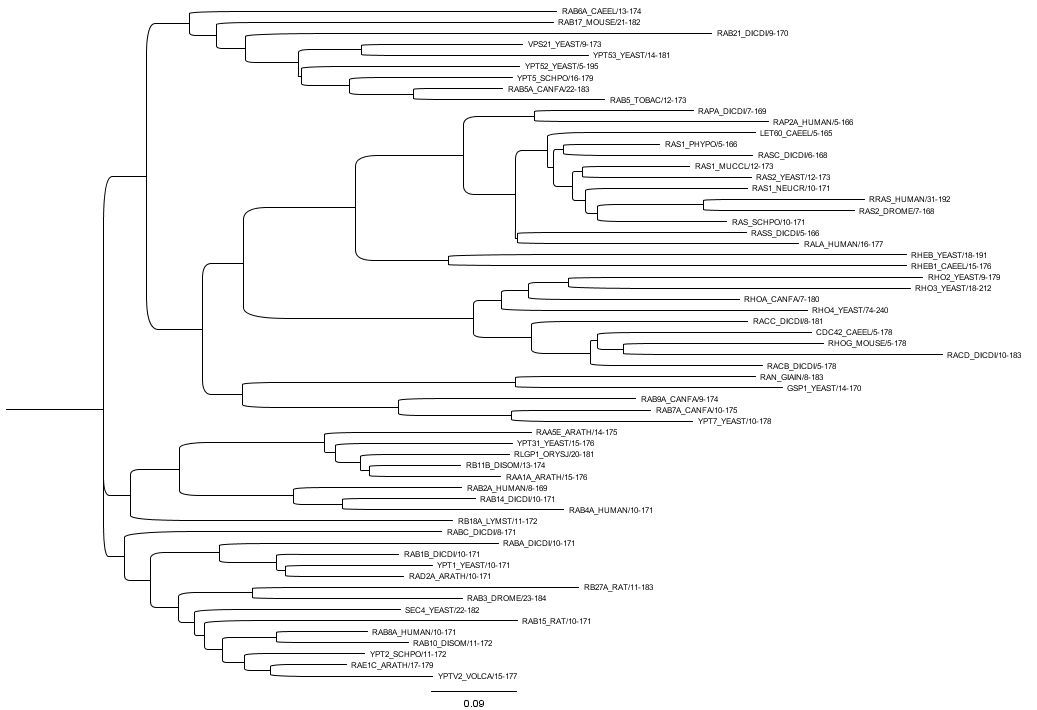
Phylogenetic tree of RAS superfamily: This tree was created using FigTree (free online software).

== Use and importance of protein families ==
As the total number of sequenced proteins increases and interest expands in proteome analysis, an effort is ongoing to organize proteins into families and to describe their component domains and motifs. Reliable identification of protein families is critical to phylogenetic analysis, functional annotation, and the exploration of the diversity of protein function in a given phylogenetic branch. The Enzyme Function Initiative uses protein families and superfamilies as the basis for development of a sequence/structure-based strategy for large scale functional assignment of enzymes of unknown function. The algorithmic means for establishing protein families on a large scale are based on a notion of similarity.

== Protein family resources ==
Many biological databases catalog protein families and allow users to match query sequences to known families. These include:

- Pfam - Protein families database of alignments and HMMs
- PROSITE - Database of protein domains, families and functional sites
- PIRSF - SuperFamily Classification System
- PASS2 - Protein Alignment as Structural Superfamilies v2 - PASS2@NCBS
- SUPERFAMILY - Library of HMMs representing superfamilies and database of (superfamily and family) annotations for all completely sequenced organisms
- SCOP and CATH - Classifications of protein structures into superfamilies, families and domains

Similarly, many database-searching algorithms exist, for example:

- BLAST - DNA sequence similarity search
- BLASTp - Protein sequence similarity search
- OrthoFinder - Method for clustering proteins into families (orthogroups)

== See also ==
- Gene family
- Genome annotation
- Sequence clustering
