= Trimeresurus stejnegeri chenbihuii =

Scientific classification
- Kingdom: Animalia
- Phylum: Chordata
- Class: Reptilia
- Order: Squamata
- Suborder: Serpentes
- Family: Viperidae
- Genus: Trimeresurus
- Species: T. stejnegeri
- Subspecies: T. s. chenbihuii

Trinomial name
- Trimeresurus stejnegeri chenbihuii Zhao, 1995

Synonyms
- Trimeresurus stejnegeri chenbihuii Zhao, 1995; Trimeresurus stejnegeri chenbihuii — Zhao, 1997; Trimeresurus stejnegeri chenbihuii — Nguyen et al., 2009

Subspecies of snake

Trimeresurus stejnegeri chenbihuii, commonly known as the Chen's bamboo pitviper, is a subspecies of venomous pitviper in the family Viperidae. The subspecies is endemic to Hainan Island in China.

== Etymology ==
The specific name, chenbihuii, is in honor of Professor Bi-Hui Chen of Anhui Normal University, who is a Chinese herpetologist.

== Description ==
The scalation of T. s. chenbihuii includes 21 rows of dorsal scales at midbody, 169-178/168-174 (160-170/167-174) ventral scales in males/females, 70-80/66-78(56-73) subcaudal scales in males/females, and 10-12 supralabial scales.

== Geographic range ==
T. s. chenbihuii is found in China on Hainan Island on Mount Diaoluo at 225–290 m (738–951 ft) elevation (Lingshui County), and on Wuzhi Mountain at 500 m (1,600 ft) elevation (Qiongzhong County). The type locality given is "Diaoluo Shan, Lingshui Co., Hainan Prov., China; altitude about 250 m [820 ft]".
