= SpoT =

Bifunctional (p)ppGpp synthase/hydrolase SpoT
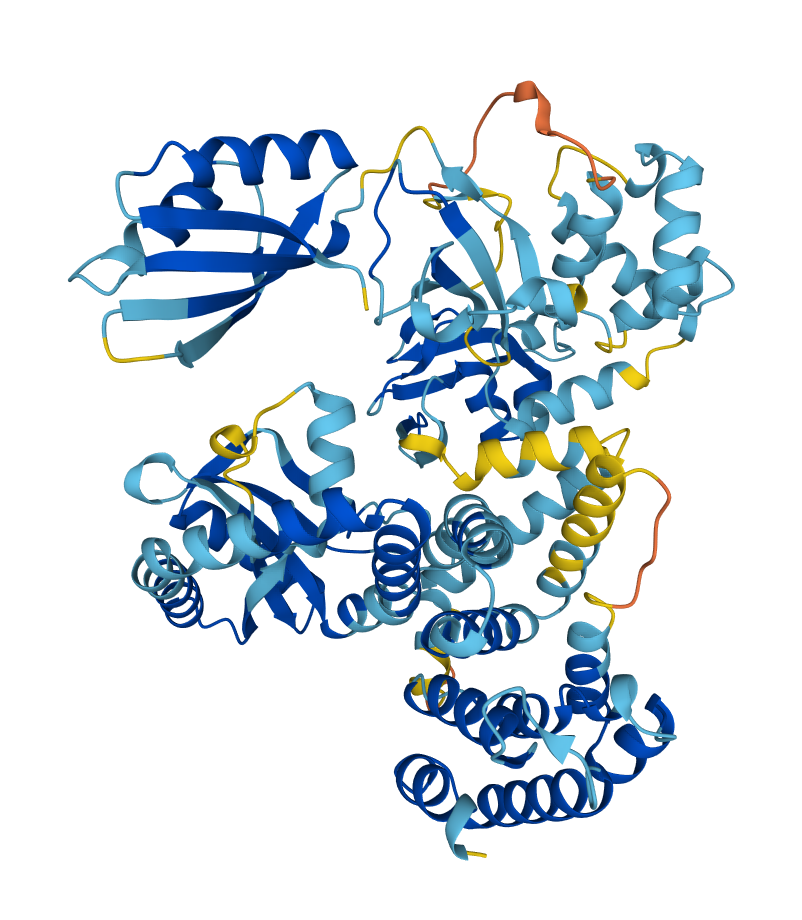
- Predicted structure of bifunctional (p)ppGpp synthase/hydrolase SpoT. Dark blue areas represent very high model confidence (pLDDT > 90). Light blue areas represent moderate model confidence (90>pLDDT > 70). Yellow areas represent low model confidence (70>pLDDT > 50). Orange areas represent very low model confidence (pLDDT < 50).

Identifiers
- Organism: Escherichia coli (strain K12)
- Symbol: spoT
- UniProt: P0AG24
Search for
- Structures: Swiss-model
- Domains: InterPro

Bifunctional (p)ppGpp synthase/hydrolase SpoT or SpoT is a regulatory enzyme in the RelA/SpoT Homologue (RSH) protein family that synthesizes and hydrolyzes (p)ppGpp to regulate the bacterial stringent response to environmental stressors. SpoT is considered a "long" form RSH protein and is found in many bacteria and plant chloroplasts. SpoT and its homologues have been studied in bacterial model organism E.coli for their role in the production and degradation of (p)ppGpp in the stringent response pathway.

== Role in Stringent Response Pathway ==
The stringent response regulated by SpoT, RelA, and their homologues can cause a bacterium to increase its persistence in stressful environments. SpoT can act as both a hydrolase and a synthetase to (p)ppGpp alarmones in the stringent response pathway with Mn2+ as its cofactor. When there are environmental stressors present, SpoT uses ATP and GDP to synthesize (p)ppGpp and catalyze the stringent response. When stressors are removed and a stringent response is no longer necessary SpoT hydrolyzes (p)ppGpp, cleaving it into GTP and diphosphate. Environmental stressors including but not limited to amino acid starvation, carbon deficiencies, phosphate deficiencies and changes in temperature have been documented to cause the gene encoding SpoT to activate.

The acyl carrier protein (ACP) binds to the TGS domain of SpoT; this binding is probably influenced by the ratio of unacylated ACP to acylated ACP in the cell.

=== Role as a Hydrolase ===
SpoT mainly serves as a hydrolase in systems similar to E.coli. SpoT's hydrolase activity is Mn2+-dependent with a conserved His-Asp (HD) motif. Phosphate starvation is sensed by SpoT hydrolase to elevate (p)ppGpp, which induces IraP, a RssB antiadaptor that antagonizes RssB activation of RpoS turnover, thereby inducing RpoS.

=== SpoT in E. coli ===
In E. coli, the SpoT protein consists of 702 amino acids. E.coli uses RelA and SpoT as its two main (p)ppGpp regulating enzymes. When the gene for encoding RelA is nonfunctional, E. coli can still regulate (p)ppGpp through SpoT as it has both HD and SYNTH domains.

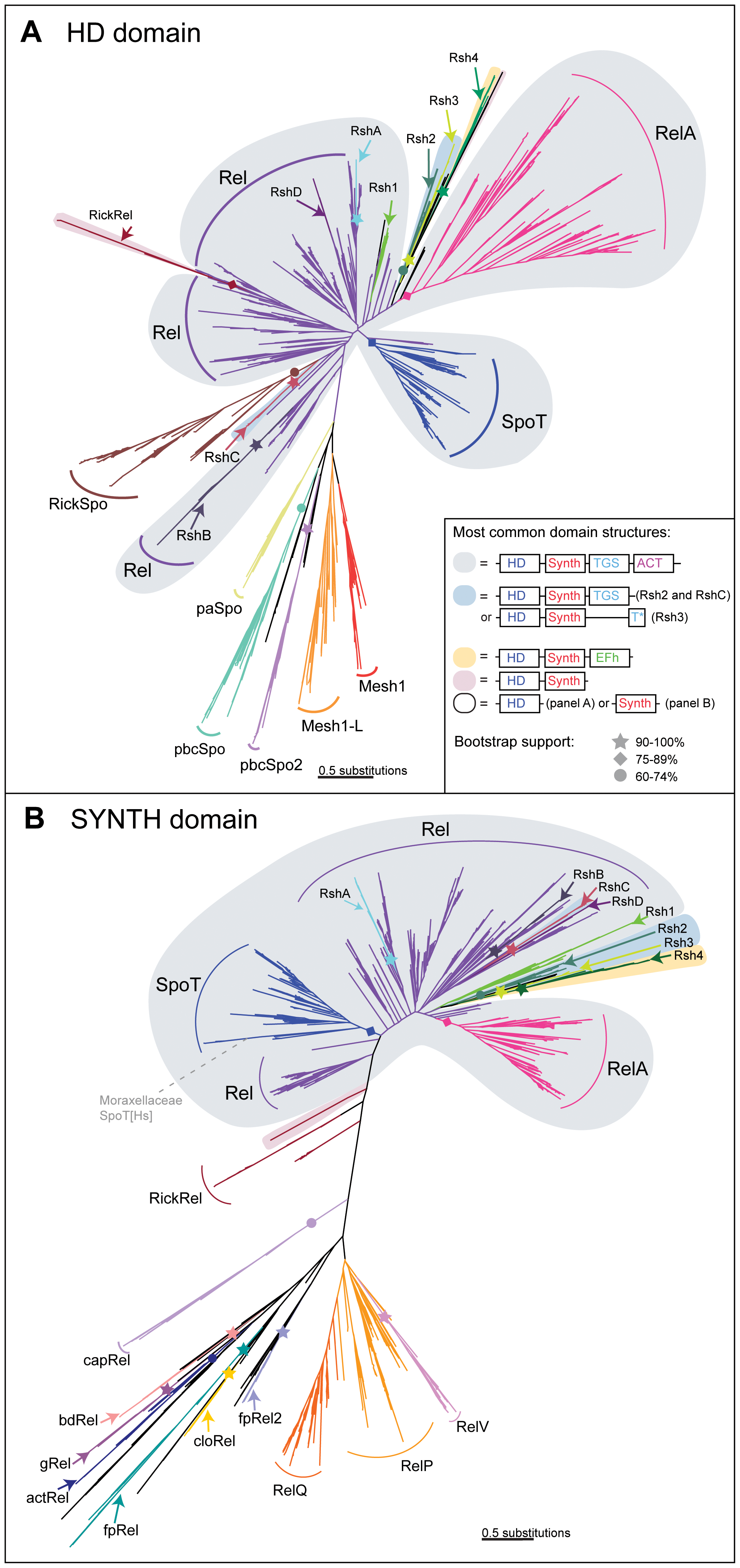
RelA/SpoT Homologue (RSH) protein family domains separated by hydrolase (HD) function and synthetase (SYNTH) function.

== Related Proteins and the RelA/SpoT Homologue Superfamily ==
SpoT and RelA have many homologous variations, forming the RelA/SpoT Homologue (RSH) protein family. These homologues serve similar functions to SpoT and RelA in stringent responses. Protein domains observed in members of the RSH protein family are separated by hydrolase (HD) functionality and synthetase (SYNTH) functionality (see Figure 2).
