= Spotz =

Spotz may refer to:

People

- Katie Spotz (b. 1987), an American adventurer
- Leslie Spotz, an American pianist

== See also ==
- Spot (disambiguation)
