= Hepacivirin =

Identifiers
- EC no.: 3.4.21.98
- CAS no.: 149885-80-3

Databases
- IntEnz: IntEnz view
- BRENDA: BRENDA entry
- ExPASy: NiceZyme view
- KEGG: KEGG entry
- MetaCyc: metabolic pathway
- PRIAM: profile
- PDB structures: RCSB PDB PDBe PDBsum
Search
- PMC: articles
- PubMed: articles
- NCBI: proteins

Hepacivirin (EC 3.4.21.98, Cpro-2, hepatitis C virus NS3 serine proteinase, NS3-4A serine proteinase complex) is an enzyme. This enzyme catalyses the following chemical reaction:

Hydrolysis of four peptide bonds in the viral precursor polyprotein, commonly with Asp or Glu in the P6 position, Cys or Thr in P1 and Ser or Ala in P1'

This enzyme is encoded by the genome of the viruses of the hepatitis C group.
