= SpoIVB peptidase =

Identifiers
- EC no.: 3.4.21.116
- CAS no.: 296241-18-4

Databases
- IntEnz: IntEnz view
- BRENDA: BRENDA entry
- ExPASy: NiceZyme view
- KEGG: KEGG entry
- MetaCyc: metabolic pathway
- PRIAM: profile
- PDB structures: RCSB PDB PDBe PDBsum
Search
- PMC: articles
- PubMed: articles
- NCBI: proteins

SpoIVB peptidase (EC 3.4.21.116, sporulation factor IV B protease) is an enzyme. This enzyme catalyses the following chemical reaction

Self-cleaves Val52-Asn53, Ala62-Phe63 and Val74-Thr75 at the N-terminus of SpoIVB

This enzyme participates in gene expression during the later stages of spore formation in Bacillus subtilis.
