= Diadenylate cyclase =

DNA binding protein

diadenylate cyclase
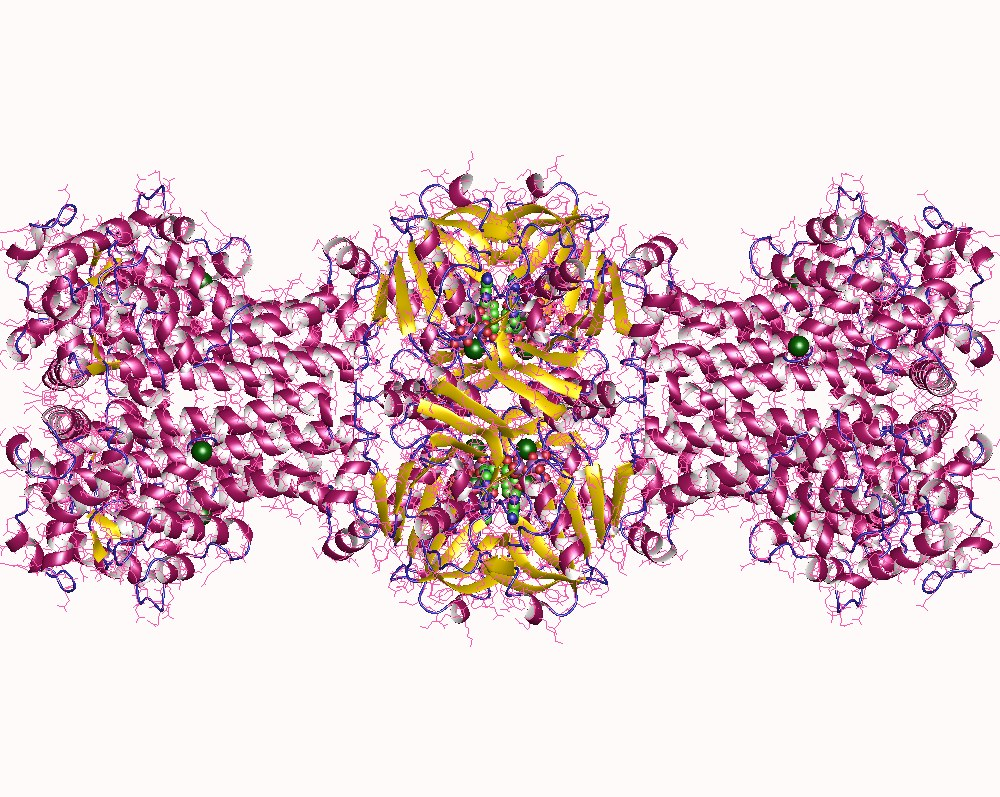
- Diadenylate cyclase homooctamer, Thermotoga maritima

Identifiers
- EC no.: 2.7.7.85

Databases
- IntEnz: IntEnz view
- BRENDA: BRENDA entry
- ExPASy: NiceZyme view
- KEGG: KEGG entry
- MetaCyc: metabolic pathway
- PRIAM: profile
- PDB structures: RCSB PDB PDBe PDBsum
Search
- PMC: articles
- PubMed: articles
- NCBI: proteins

Diadenylate cyclase EC 2.7.7.85, DNA integrity scanning protein DisA is a DNA binding protein participates in a DNA-damage check-point. DisA forms globular foci that rapidly scan along the chromosomes searching for lesions. Catalytic activity

2 ATP $\rightleftharpoons$ 2 diphosphate + cyclic di-3',5'-adenylate.

This enzyme has diadenylate cyclase activity, catalyzing the condensation of 2 ATP molecules into cyclic di-AMP (c-di-AMP). c-di-AMP likely acts as a signaling molecule that may couple DNA integrity with a cellular process. This rate-limiting step is the accessibility of the active site; mutating the possible exit tunnel (residues 128-130) increases product 2-fold despite Arg-130 being important for ATP-binding. Does not convert GTP to c-di-GMP.
