= Flavivirin =

Identifiers
- EC no.: 3.4.21.91
- CAS no.: 154215-26-6

Databases
- IntEnz: IntEnz view
- BRENDA: BRENDA entry
- ExPASy: NiceZyme view
- KEGG: KEGG entry
- MetaCyc: metabolic pathway
- PRIAM: profile
- PDB structures: RCSB PDB PDBe PDBsum
Search
- PMC: articles
- PubMed: articles
- NCBI: proteins

Flavivirin (EC 3.4.21.91, Yellow fever virus (flavivirus) protease, NS2B-3 proteinase) is a protease, a type of enzyme.
