= Equine arterivirus serine peptidase =

Identifiers
- EC no.: 3.4.21.114

Databases
- IntEnz: IntEnz view
- BRENDA: BRENDA entry
- ExPASy: NiceZyme view
- KEGG: KEGG entry
- MetaCyc: metabolic pathway
- PRIAM: profile
- PDB structures: RCSB PDB PDBe PDBsum
Search
- PMC: articles
- PubMed: articles
- NCBI: proteins

Equine arterivirus serine peptidase (EC 3.4.21.114) is an enzyme. This enzyme catalyses the following chemical reaction

Cleavage of (Glu/Gln)-(Gly/Ser/Ala) in arterivirus replicase translation products ORF1a and ORF1ab

In the equine arterivirus (EAV), the replicase gene is translated into open reading frame 1a (ORF1a) and ORF1ab [polyprotein]s.
