= The Spot (food hall) =

Food hall in Rockville, Maryland, US

Coordinates: 39.0872°N 77.1525°W

- Interactive map of The Spot

Restaurant information
- Established: July 7, 2018
- Location: Rockville, Maryland

The Spot is a food hall in Rockville, Maryland serving Asian fusion cuisine. The food hall was founded in July 2018 by Edward Wong of Hong Kong and houses seven storefronts including Gong Cha, Cheers Cut, Mian, Poki DC, Momo Mochi Donut, Tekken Punch, Spot Bar, and Spot Grill.

== History ==
The Spot opened on July 7, 2018 in the mixed-use development, Metropolitan Apartment Building across from Rockville Town Center. It was founded by Edward Wong who was inspired by his native Hong Kong. He is a partner at the Mini-Spot at Terrapin Row in College Park, Maryland, Akira Ramen & Izakaya, and Urban Hot Pot. Other partners include Vivian Zhu, and Poke District founder Gary Ngo. The facility has a 150 indoor seats and 50 seats in an outdoor bar area with 6,200 square-foot space in total. It hosts 7 storefronts. In 2018, store fronts included Gong Cha, Cheers Cut, a Taiwanese fried chicken and seafood franchise, Mian, a Chinese and Taiwanese hand-pulled noodle bowls, Poki DC, a Hawaiian-style poke franchise, Alpaca Dessert, which is a house dessert bar serving Taiwanese snow ice and Hong Kong egg waffle cones, and Spot Bar and Grill.
