= Calicivirin =

Enzyme

Identifiers
- EC no.: 3.4.22.66

Databases
- BRENDA: enzyme data
- ExPASy: NiceZyme view
- KEGG: enzyme entry
- MetaCyc: metabolic pathway
- Rhea: reactions
- PDB structures: RCSB PDB PDBe PDBsum
Search
- PMC: articles
- PubMed: articles
- NCBI: proteins

Calicivirin (EC 3.4.22.66, Camberwell virus processing peptidase, Chiba virus processing peptidase, Norwalk virus processing peptidase, Southampton virus processing peptidase, norovirus virus processing peptidase, calicivirus trypsin-like cysteine protease, calicivirus TCP, calicivirus 3C-like protease, calicivirus endopeptidase, rabbit hemorrhagic disease virus 3C endopeptidase) is an enzyme. This enzyme catalyses the following chemical reaction

Endopeptidase with a preference for cleavage when the P1 position is occupied by Glu- and the P1- position is occupied by Gly-

Viruses that are members of the genus Norovirus (family Caliciviridae) are a major cause of epidemic acute viral gastroenteritis.
