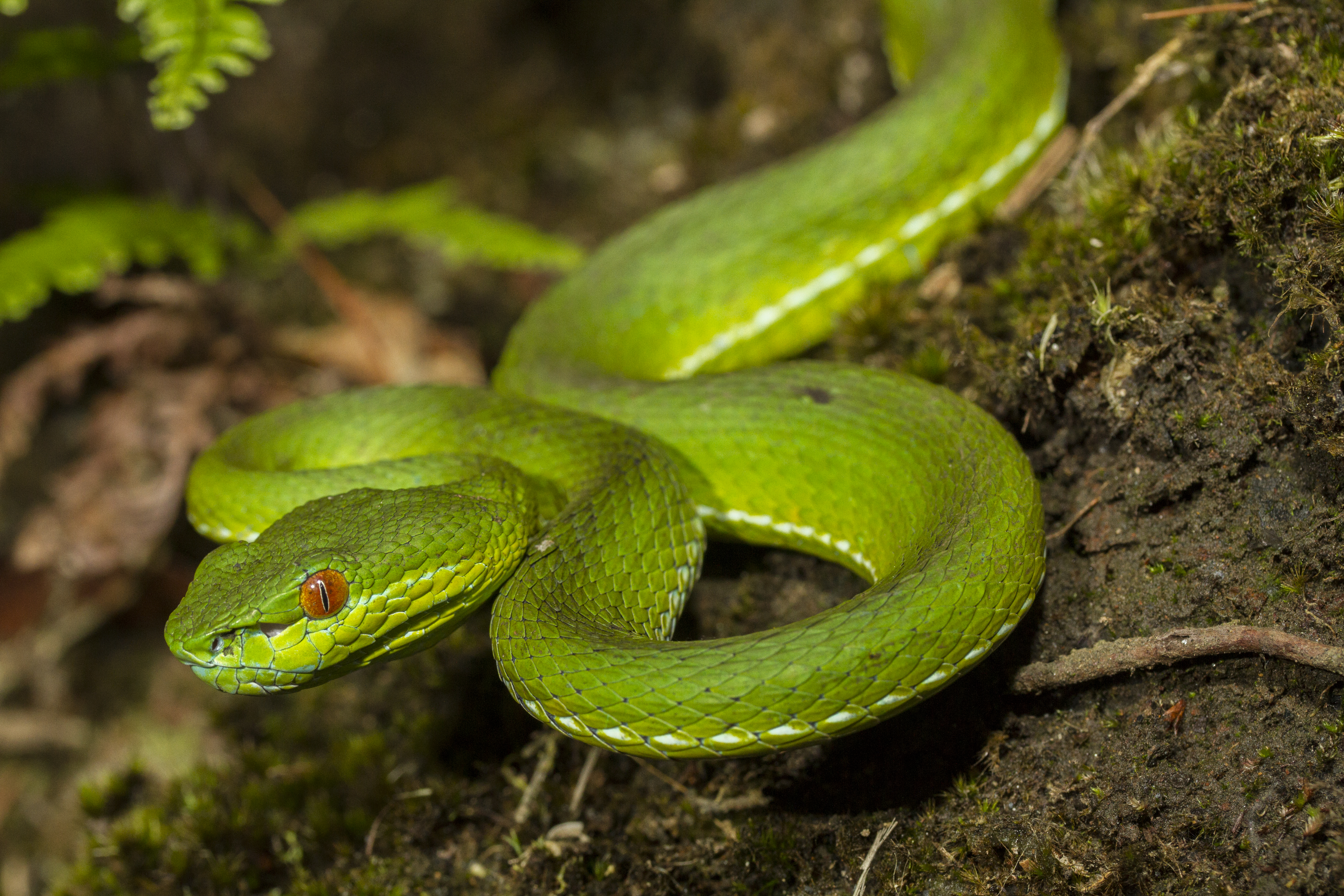

Conservation status
- Least Concern (IUCN 3.1)

Scientific classification
- Kingdom: Animalia
- Phylum: Chordata
- Class: Reptilia
- Order: Squamata
- Suborder: Serpentes
- Family: Viperidae
- Genus: Trimeresurus
- Species: T. stejnegeri

Binomial name
- Trimeresurus stejnegeri Schmidt, 1925

Synonyms
- List: Trimeresurus stejnegeri Schmidt, 1925; Trimeresurus gramineus stejnegeri — Stejneger, 1927; Trimeresurus gramineus formosensis Maki, 1931; Trimeresurus gramineus kodairai Maki, 1931; Trimeresurus stejnegeri stejnegeri — Pope, 1935; Trimeresurus stejnegeri makii Klemmer, 1963; Trimeresurus stejnegeri formosensis — Welch, 1988; Trimeresurus stejnegeri kodairai — Welch, 1988; Trimeresurus stejnegeri — Cox et al., 1998; Viridovipera stejnegeri — Malhotra & Thorpe, 2004; Trimeresurus (Viridovipera) stejnegeri — David et al., 2011

= Trimeresurus stejnegeri =

Species of snake

Trimeresurus stejnegeri is a species of venomous pit viper endemic to Asia. Two subspecies are currently recognized, including the nominate subspecies described here.

Common names for this pit viper include Stejneger's pit viper, Chinese pit viper, Chinese green tree viper, bamboo viper, Chinese bamboo pitviper, Chinese bamboo viper, and Chinese tree viper. For other common, non-scientific names, see § Common names below.

== Etymology ==
The specific name, stejnegeri, is in honor of Leonhard Stejneger, the Norwegian-born, American herpetologist who worked at the Smithsonian Institution for over 60 years.

== Description ==
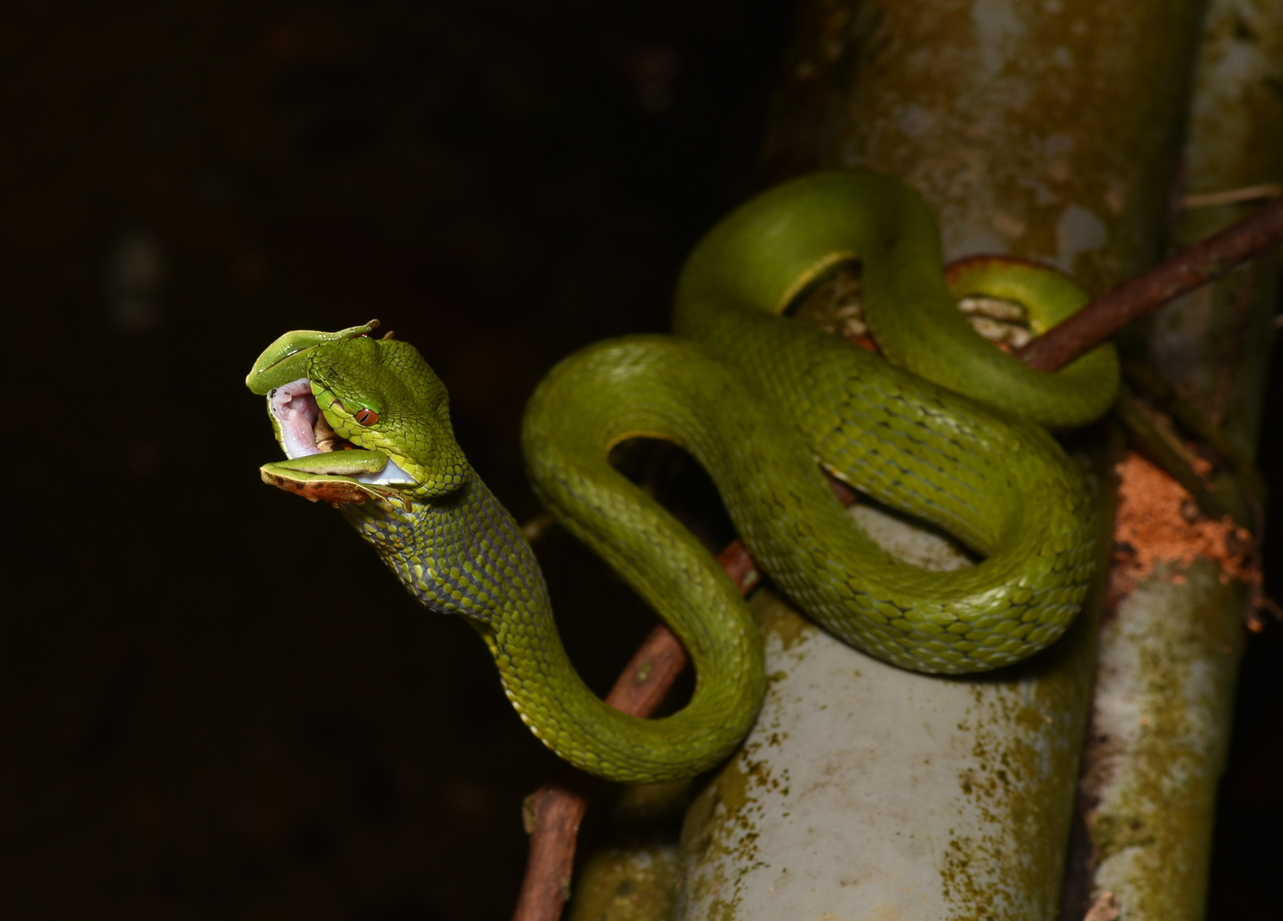
Eating a Moltrecht's green tree frog

Trimeresurus stejnegeri grows to a maximum total length of 75 centimetres (30 in), which includes a tail length of 14.5 centimetres (5.7 in). The males have hemipenes that are short and spinose beyond the bifurcation.

The dorsal scales are arranged in 21 longitudinal rows at midbody. There are 9–11 upper labials, of which the first are separated from nasal scales by a distinct suture. The supraoculars are single, narrow, and sometimes divided by a transverse suture. There are 11–16 scales in a line between the supraoculars. The ventrals number 150–174, and the subcaudals are 54–77. All of the subcaudals are paired.

The color pattern is bright to dark green above, pale green to whitish below, the two separated by a bright bicolored orange or brown (below) and white (above) (males) or bicolored or white only (females) ventrolateral stripe, which occupies the whole of the outermost scale row and a portion of the second row.

Bamboo vipers are carnivores: they eat small rodents, birds, frogs, and lizards.

Yellow colored mutants have been reported.

== Common names ==
Common names for T. stejnegeri include bamboo viper, Chinese tree viper, bamboo snake, Chinese green tree viper, Chinese bamboo viper, Stejneger's pit viper, Stejneger's palm viper, red tail snake, Stejneger's bamboo pitviper,

== Geographic range ==
Trimeresurus stejnegeri is found in India (Western Ghats & Eastern Ghats, Northeast India) and Nepal through Myanmar and Laos to much of southern China (Yunnan, Sichuan, Gansu, Jiangxi, Jiangsu, Hunan, Hubei, Guizhou, Guangxi, Guangdong, Hainan, Fujian, Anhui, Zhejiang), Vietnam, and Taiwan. The type locality was originally listed as "Shaowu, Fukien Province, China", and later amended to "N.W. Fukien Province" by Pope & Pope (1933) (Fukien being the former romanization of Fujian). this snake is often confused with Trimeresurus, Ahaetulla oxyrhyncha in India.

== Habitat ==
The preferred natural habitat of T. stejnegeri is forest, at altitudes from sea level to 2,000 m (6,600 ft).

== Venom ==
Trimeresurus stejnegeri has a potent hemotoxin. The wound usually feels extremely painful, as if it had been branded with a hot iron, and the pain does not subside until about 24 hours after being bitten. Within a few minutes of being bitten, the surrounding flesh dies and turns black, highlighting the puncture wounds. The wound site quickly swells, and the skin and muscle become black due to necrosis. The size of the necrotic area depends on the amount of venom injected and the depth of the bite.

== Reproduction ==
T. stejnegeri is viviparous.

== Subspecies ==
Subspecies	Taxon author	Common name	Geographic range
T. s. chenbihuii	Zhao, 1997	Chen's pit viper	China, Hainan Island: on Mount Diaoluo at 225–290 m elevation (Lingshui County) and on Wuzhi Mountain at 500 m elevation (Qiongzhong County).
T. s. stejnegeri	Schmidt, 1925	Stejneger's pit viper	China (in eastern Sichuan, Guizhou, Hubei, Anhui, Jiangsu, Zhejiang, Jiangxi, Hunan, Fujian, Gansu, Guangdong and Guangxi), Taiwan, and Vietnam.
