= Guanosine pentaphosphate =

Names
- Other names guanosine pentaphosphate (pppGpp), guanosine tetraphosphate (ppGpp)

Identifiers
CAS Number	tetraphosphate: 32452-17-8; pentaphosphate: 38918-96-6
3D model (JSmol)	tetraphosphate: Interactive image; pentaphosphate: Interactive image
Beilstein Reference	(pentaphosphate) 1205996
ChEBI	tetraphosphate: CHEBI:17633; pentaphosphate: CHEBI:16690
ChemSpider	tetraphosphate: 388557; pentaphosphate: 34987
DrugBank	tetraphosphate: DB04022
KEGG	tetraphosphate: C01228; pentaphosphate: C04494
PubChem CID	tetraphosphate: 135398637; pentaphosphate: 135398629
CompTox Dashboard (EPA)	pentaphosphate: DTXSID50955132
- InChI: tetraphosphate: InChI=1S/C10H17N5O17P4/c11-10-13-7-4(8(17)14-10)12-2-15(7)9-5(16)6(30-36(26,27)32-34(21,22)23)3(29-9)1-28-35(24,25)31-33(18,19)20/h2-3,5-6,9,16H,1H2,(H,24,25)(H,26,27)(H2,18,19,20)(H2,21,22,23)(H3,11,13,14,17)/t3-,5-,6-,9-/m1/s1 Key: BUFLLCUFNHESEH-UUOKFMHZSA-N; pentaphosphate: InChI=1S/C10H18N5O20P5/c11-10-13-7-4(8(17)14-10)12-2-15(7)9-5(16)6(32-39(26,27)33-36(18,19)20)3(31-9)1-30-38(24,25)35-40(28,29)34-37(21,22)23/h2-3,5-6,9,16H,1H2,(H,24,25)(H,26,27)(H,28,29)(H2,18,19,20)(H2,21,22,23)(H3,11,13,14,17)/t3-,5-,6-,9-/m1/s1 Key: KCPMACXZAITQAX-UUOKFMHZSA-N
- SMILES: tetraphosphate: O[C@H]1[C@H](N2C3=C(N=C2)C(=O)N=C(N)N3)O[C@H](COP(OP(=O)(O)O)(=O)O)[C@H]1OP(OP(=O)(O)O)(=O)O; pentaphosphate: C1=NC2=C(N1[C@H]3[C@@H]([C@@H]([C@H](O3)COP(=O)(O)OP(=O)(O)OP(=O)(O)O)OP(=O)(O)OP(=O)(O)O)O)N=C(NC2=O)N

Properties
Chemical formula	C_{10}H_{18}N_{5}O_{20}P_{5}
Molar mass	683.14 g·mol^{−1}
- Except where otherwise noted, data are given for materials in their standard state (at 25 °C [77 °F], 100 kPa). Infobox references

(p)ppGpp, guanosine pentaphosphate and tetraphosphate, also known as the "magic spot" nucleotides, are alarmones involved in the stringent response in bacteria that cause the inhibition of RNA synthesis when there is a shortage of amino acids. This inhibition by (p)ppGpp decreases translation in the cell, conserving amino acids present. Furthermore, ppGpp and pppGpp cause the up-regulation of many other genes involved in stress response such as the genes for amino acid uptake (from surrounding media) and biosynthesis. (p)ppGpp is also conserved in plants, where it is known to play a role in regulating growth and developmental processes.

== Discovery ==
ppGpp and pppGpp were first identified by Michael Cashel in 1969. These nucleotides were found to accumulate rapidly in Escherichia coli cells starved for amino acids and inhibit synthesis of ribosomal and transfer RNAs. It is now known that (p)ppGpp is also produced in response to other stressors including carbon and phosphate starvation. Historically, literature surrounding (p)ppGpp have given conflicting findings and information on its role in bacterial stress responses.

== Absence ==
E.coli are shown to be more sensitive to accumulations of guanosine tetraphosphate than guanosine pentaphosphate. A complete absence of (p)ppGpp causes multiple amino acid requirements, poor survival of aged cultures, aberrant cell division, morphology, and immotility, as well as being locked in a growth mode during entry into starvation.

== Synthesis and degradation ==
The synthesis and degradation of (p)ppGpp have been most extensively characterized in the bacterial model organism Escherichia coli.

=== RelA's role in synthesis ===
(p)ppGpp is created via pppGpp synthase, also known as RelA, and is converted from pppGpp to ppGpp via pppGpp phosphohydrolase. RelA is associated with about every one in two hundred ribosomes and it becomes activated when an uncharged transfer RNA (tRNA) molecule enters the A site of the ribosome, due to the shortage of amino acid required by the tRNA. If a mutant bacterium is relA^{−} it is said to be relaxed and no regulation of RNA production due to amino acid absence is seen.

=== SpoT's role in degradation ===
E. coli produces a second protein responsible for degradation of (p)ppGpp, SpoT. When the amino acid balance in the cell is restored, (p)ppGpp is hydrolyzed by SpoT and returned to a more energetically favorable state. This protein also has the capacity to synthesize (p)ppGpp, and seems to be the primary synthase under certain conditions of stress. Most other bacteria encode a single protein that is responsible for both synthesis and degradation of (p)ppGpp, generally homologs of SpoT.

== Targets ==
Targets of (p)ppGpp include rRNA operons, of which there are seven in E.coli, all of which have 2 promoters. When (p)ppGpp associates with the promoter it affects the RNA polymerase enzyme's ability to bind and initiate transcription. It is thought that (p)ppGpp may affect the stability of the open complex formed by RNA polymerase on DNA and therefore affect promoter clearance. Its presence also leads to an increase in pausing during transcription elongation and it competes with nucleoside triphosphate substrates.

There is now a consensus that (p)ppGpp is a determinant of growth rate control rather than nucleoside triphosphate (NTP) substrate concentrations.

== Function ==
=== Inhibition of protein synthesis ===
ppGpp inhibits IF2-mediated fMet-Phe initiation dipeptide formation, probably by interfering with 30S and 50S subunit interactions. E. coli accumulates more ppGpp than pppGpp during amino acid starvation, and ppGpp has about 8-fold greater efficiency than that of pppGpp. While B. subtilis accumulates more pppGpp than ppGpp.

=== Inhibition of DNA replication ===
In E. coli amino acid starvation inhibited DNA replication at the initiation stage at oriC, most probably owing to the lack of the DnaA replication initiation protein. In B. subtilis, the replication arrest due to (p)ppGpp accumulation is caused by the binding of an Rtp protein to specific sites about 100-200kb away from oriC in both directions. DNA primase (DnaG) was directly inhibited by (p)ppGpp. Unlike E. coli, B. subtilis accumulates more pppGpp than ppGpp; the more abundant nucleotide is a more-potent DnaG inhibitor. ppGpp can bind with Obg protein which belongs to the conserved, small GTPase protein family. Obg protein interacts with several regulators (RsbT, RsbW, RsbX) necessary for the stress activation of sigma B.

=== Phage replication and development ===
The (p)ppGpp levels of the host seem to act as a sensor for phage lambda development, primarily affecting transcription. Modest ppGpp levels inhibit pR and active pE, pI, and paQ promoters in vivo and have effects in vitro that seem to favor lysogeny. In contrast, absent or high concentrations of (p)ppGpp favor lysis. Modest ppGpp levels favor lysogeny by leading to low HflB (FtsH). When ppGpp is either absent or high, HflB protease levels are high; this leads to lower CII (a lysogeny-promoting phage protein) and favors lysis.

=== Transcription ===
==== Affected promoters ====
One of the key elements of promoters inhibited by (p)ppGpp is the presence of a GC-rich discriminator, defined as a region between TATA-box (-10 box) and +1 nt (where +1 is the transcription start site). Promoters negatively regulated by ppGpp have a 16-bp linker, in contrast with the 17-bp consensus. Promoters activated by ppGpp seem to have an AT-rich discriminator and linger linkers (for example, the his promoter linker is 18 bp).

==== RNAP is the target ====
Genetic evidence suggesting that RNAP was the target of ppGpp came from the discovery that M+ mutants (also called stringent RNAP mutants) display in vitro and in vivo mimicry of physiology and transcription regulation conferred by (p)ppGpp, even in its absence. Cross-linking ppGpp to RNAP reinforced this notion. Structural details of an association between ppGpp and RNAP came from the analysis of cocrystals that positioned ppGpp in the secondary channel of RNAP near the catalytic center.

==== DksA augments regulation ====
DksA is a 17-kDa protein, its structure is similar to GreA and GreB, which are well-characterized transcriptional elongation factors. GreA and GreB bind directly to RNAP rather than DNA and act by inserting their N-terminal coiled-coil finger domain through the RNAP secondary channel. Two conserved acidic residues at the tip of the finger domain are necessary to induce RNAP's intrinsic ability to cleave backtracked RNA. DksA also possesses two acidic residues at its finger tip, but it does not induce nucleolytic cleavage activity. Instead, these residues are proposed to stabilize ppGpp binding to RNAP by mutual coordination of an Mg2+ ion that is crucial for polymerization.

=== Transcription inhibition and activation ===
ppGpp directly inhibits transcription from ribosomal promoters. One model is ppGpp and DksA together and independently decrease the stability of the open complexes formed on DNA by RNAP. Another model is the trapping mechanism. In this model, RNAP is trapped by ppGpp in closed complexes and is unable to initiate transcription. Thus, ppGpp seems to act at many levels, and the mechanism of its action is a complex outcome of several factors, intrinsic promoter properties not being the least of them. The transcription activation by ppGpp can be direct or indirect. Direct activation occurs when RNAP interacts with effectors, such as ppGpp, DksA or both, to increase transcription from a given promoter. Indirect activation by these effectors of one promoter relies on inhibition of other (strong) promoters, leading to increased availability of RNAP that indirectly activates transcription initiation. The promoters that activated directly by ppGpp include PargI, PthrABC, PlivJ, and PhisG. The indirectly activation promoters include these dependent on sigma factors: S, H, N, E. When strong promoters, such as rrn, are inhibited, there more RNAP are available for these alternative sigma factors.

=== Pathogenesis ===
When (p)ppGpp is absent, pathogenicity is compromised for reasons that vary with the organism studied. Deleting relA and spoT genes, but not relA alone, gave a (p)ppGpp^{0} state that resulted in strong attenuation in mice and noninvasiveness in vitro. Vaccine tests reveal that 30 days after single immunization with the (p)ppGpp^{0} strain, mice were protected from challenge with wild-type Salmonella at a dose 10^{6}-fold above the established LD_{50}.

=== Polyphosphate accumulation ===
It was proposed that increased synthesis of (p)ppGpp would cause polyphosphate (PolyP) accumulation in E. coli. The alarmone could interact with exopolyphosphatase PPX, which would inhibit the hydrolysis of PolyP, thus causing its accumulation in bacteria. Although it has recently been shown that it is actually DksA and not (p)ppGpp that causes this buildup. It has been shown in Pseudomonas aeruginosa that the phoU mutant (phoU belongs to the Pho Regulon) synthesizes more (p)ppGpp and this would be one of the reasons that it accumulates more polyphosphate.
