= Stringent response =

The stringent response, also called stringent control, is a stress response of bacteria and plant chloroplasts in reaction to amino-acid starvation, fatty acid limitation, iron limitation, heat shock and other stress conditions and growth processes. The stringent response is signaled by the alarmone (p)ppGpp, and modulates transcription of up to 1/3 of all genes in the cell. This in turn causes the cell to divert resources away from growth and division and toward amino acid synthesis in order to promote survival until nutrient conditions improve.

== Response ==
In Escherichia coli, (p)ppGpp production is mediated by the ribosomal protein L11 (rplK resp. relC) and the ribosome-associated (p)ppGpp synthetase I, RelA; deacylated tRNA bound in the ribosomal A-site is the primary induction signal. RelA converts GTP and ATP into pppGpp by adding the pyrophosphate from ATP onto the 3' carbon of the ribose in GTP, releasing AMP. pppGpp is converted to ppGpp by the gpp gene product, releasing Pi. ppGpp is converted to GDP by the spoT gene product, releasing pyrophosphate (PPi). GDP is converted to GTP by the ndk gene product. Nucleoside triphosphate (NTP) provides the Pi, and is converted to Nucleoside diphosphate (NDP).

In other bacteria, the stringent response is mediated by a variety of RelA/SpoT Homologue (RSH) proteins, with some having only synthetic, or hydrolytic or both (Rel) activities.

During the stringent response, (p)ppGpp accumulation affects the resource-consuming cell processes replication, transcription, and translation. (p)ppGpp is thought to bind RNA polymerase and alter the transcriptional profile, decreasing the synthesis of translational machinery (such as rRNA and tRNA), and increasing the transcription of biosynthetic genes. Additionally, the initiation of new rounds of replication is inhibited and the cell cycle arrests until nutrient conditions improve. Translational GTPases involved in protein biosynthesis are also affected by ppGpp, with Initiation Factor 2 (IF2) being the main target.

Chemical reaction catalyzed by RelA:

ATP + GTP → AMP + pppGpp

Chemical reaction catalyzed by SpoT:

ppGpp → GDP + PPi

or

pppGpp -> GTP + PPi
