= TEV protease =

Highly specific protease

nuclear-inclusion-a endopeptidase
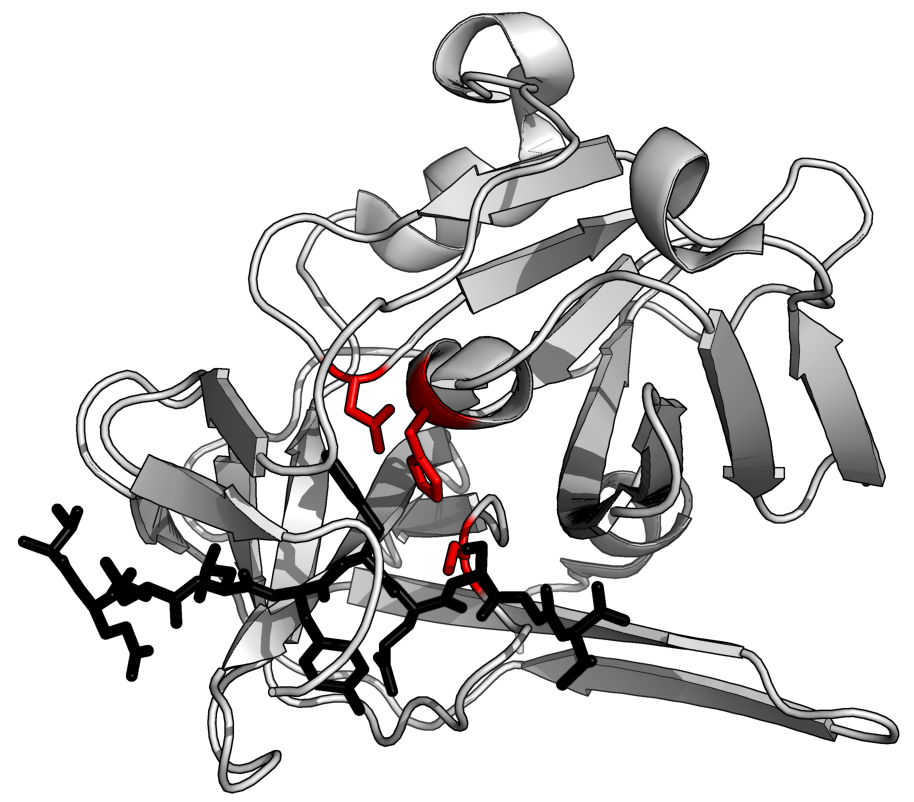
- TEV protease (white) complexed with peptide substrate (black) with active site triad residues (red). (PDB: 1lvb)

Identifiers
- EC no.: 3.4.22.44
- CAS no.: 139946-51-3

Databases
- BRENDA: enzyme data
- ExPASy: NiceZyme view
- KEGG: enzyme entry
- MetaCyc: metabolic pathway
- Rhea: reactions
- PDB structures: RCSB PDB PDBe PDBsum
Search
- PMC: articles
- PubMed: articles
- NCBI: proteins

TEV protease (EC 3.4.22.44, Tobacco Etch Virus nuclear-inclusion-a endopeptidase) is a highly sequence-specific cysteine protease from Tobacco Etch Virus (TEV). It is a member of the PA clan of chymotrypsin-like proteases. Due to its high sequence specificity, TEV protease is frequently used for the controlled cleavage of fusion proteins in vitro and in vivo. The consensus sequence recognized by TEV protease is Glu-Asn-Leu-Tyr-Phe-Gln-|-Ser, where "|" denotes cleaved peptide bond.

== Origin ==
The tobacco etch virus encodes its entire genome as a single massive polyprotein (350 kDa). This is cleaved into functional units by the three proteases: P1 protease (1 cleavage site), helper-component protease (1 cleavage site) and TEV protease (7 cleavage sites). The native TEV protease also contains an internal self-cleavage site. This site is slowly cleaved to inactivate the enzyme (the physiological reason for this is unknown).

== Structure and function ==
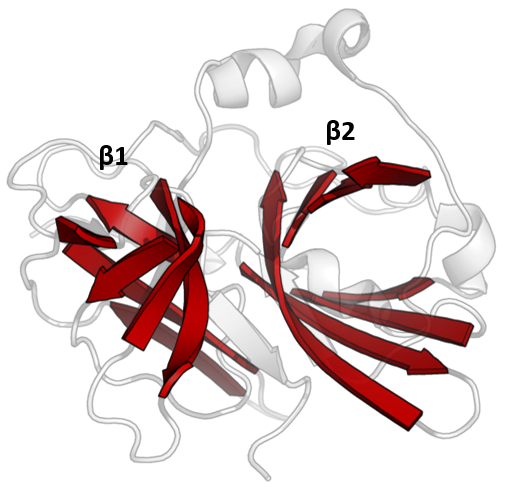
Structure of TEV protease. The double β-barrels that define the superfamily are highlighted in red. (PDB: 1lvm)

The structure of TEV protease has been solved by X-ray crystallography. It is composed of two β-barrels and a flexible C-terminal tail and displays structural homology to the chymotrypsin superfamily of proteases (PA clan, C4 family by MEROPS classification). Although homologous to cellular serine proteases (such as trypsin, elastase, thrombin etc.), TEV protease uses a cysteine as its catalytic nucleophile (as do many other viral proteases).

Covalent catalysis is performed with an Asp-His-Cys triad, split between the two barrels (Asp on β1 and His and Cys on β2). The substrate is held as a β-sheet, forming an antiparallel interaction with the cleft between the barrels and a parallel interaction with the C-terminal tail. The enzyme therefore forms a binding tunnel around the substrate and side chain interactions control specificity.

== Specificity ==
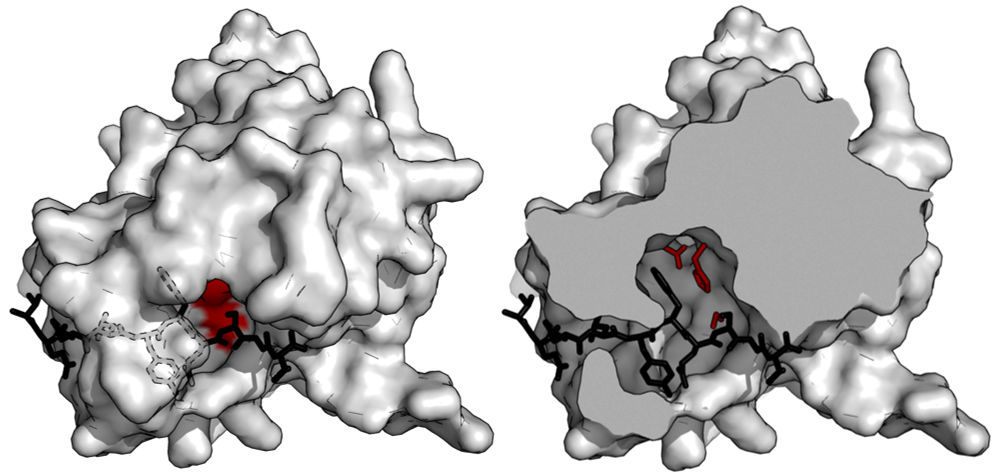
Surface model of TEV bound to uncleaved substrate (black), also showing the catalytic triad (red). The substrate binds inside an active site tunnel (left). A cutaway (right) shows the complementary shape of the binding tunnel to the substrate. (PDB: 1lvb)

The preferred, native cleavage sequence was first identified by examining the cut sites in the native polyprotein substrate for recurring sequence. The consensus for these native cut sites is ENLYFQ\S where '\' denotes the cleaved peptide bond. Residues of the substrate are labelled P6 to P1 before the cut site and P1' after the cut site. Early works also measured cleavage of an array of similar substrates to characterise how specific the protease was for the native sequence.

Studies have subsequently used sequencing of cleaved substrates from a pool of randomised sequences to determine preference patterns. Although ENLYFQ\S is the optimal sequence, the protease is active to a greater or lesser extent on a range of substrates (i.e. shows some substrate promiscuity). The highest cleavage is of sequences closest to the consensus EXLYΦQ\φ where X is any residue, Φ is any large or medium hydrophobe and φ is any small hydrophobic or polar residue. Although this sequence is the optimal, sequences with disfavoured residues at some positions can still be cleaved if the rest of the sequence is optimal.

Specificity is endowed by the large contact area between enzyme and substrate. Proteases such as trypsin have specificity for one residue before and after the cleaved bond due to a shallow binding cleft with only one or two pockets that bind the substrate side chains. Conversely, viral proteases such as TEV protease have a long C-terminal tail which completely covers the substrate to create a binding tunnel. This tunnel contains a set of tight binding pockets such that each side chain of the substrate peptide (P6 to P1') is bound in a complementary site (S6 to S1').

In particular, peptide side chain P6-Glu contacts a network of three hydrogen bonds; P5-Asn points into the solvent, making no specific interactions (hence the absence of substrate consensus at this position); P4-Leu is buried in a hydrophobic pocket; P3-Tyr is held in a hydrophobic pocket with a short hydrogen bond at the end; P2-Phe is also surrounded by hydrophobes including the face of the triad histidine; P1-Gln forms four hydrogen bonds; and P1'-Ser is only partly enclosed in a shallow hydrophobic groove.

== Application as a biochemical tool ==
One of the main uses of this protein is for removing affinity tags from purified recombinant fusion proteins. The reason for the use of TEV protease as a biochemical tool is its high sequence specificity. This specificity allows for the controlled cleavage of proteins when the preference sequence is inserted into flexible loops. It also makes TEV protease relatively non-toxic in vivo as the recognized sequence scarcely occurs in proteins.

Although rational design has had limited success in changing protease specificity, directed evolution has been used to change the preferred residue either before or after the cleavage site.

In recent developments, a next-generation TEV protease variant called Numacut has been engineered using a combination of AI-guided rational design, allosteric network analysis, and smart mutagenesis. This variant demonstrates efficient and scarless cleavage at ENLYFQ↓X motifs, where virtually all amino acids (except proline) are tolerated in the P1' position, significantly expanding its biotechnological applicability.

However, TEV protease does have limitations as a biochemical tool. It is prone to deactivation by self-cleavage (autolysis), though this can be abolished through a single S219V mutation in the internal cleavage site. The protease expressed alone is also poorly soluble, however several attempts have been made to improve its solubility through directed evolution and computational design. It has also been shown that expression can be improved by fusion to maltose binding protein (MBP) which acts a solubility-enhancing partner.

A more recent solution is offered by the Numacut variant, which combines multiple stabilizing and solubility-enhancing mutations. Numacut is expressed in high yields in E. coli, exhibits significantly improved solubility, and remains stable across a broad range of pH, salt concentrations, and buffer additives. In contrast to the wild-type enzyme, it can also be lyophilized and stored at room temperature, enhancing its applicability in industrial and pharmaceutical settings.

TEV protease has been reported to show a 10-fold loss of activity at 4 °C. TEV protease shows loss of activity at temperatures above 34 °C. The original TEV protease required the presence of reducing agent for high activity, which could interfere with the function of proteins containing disulfide bonds. After incorporation of various mutations, later "superTEV protease" versions are highly active in the presence or absence of reducing agent.

The molecular weight of this enzyme varies between 25 and 27 kDa depending on the specific construct used.
