= Peptidase Do =

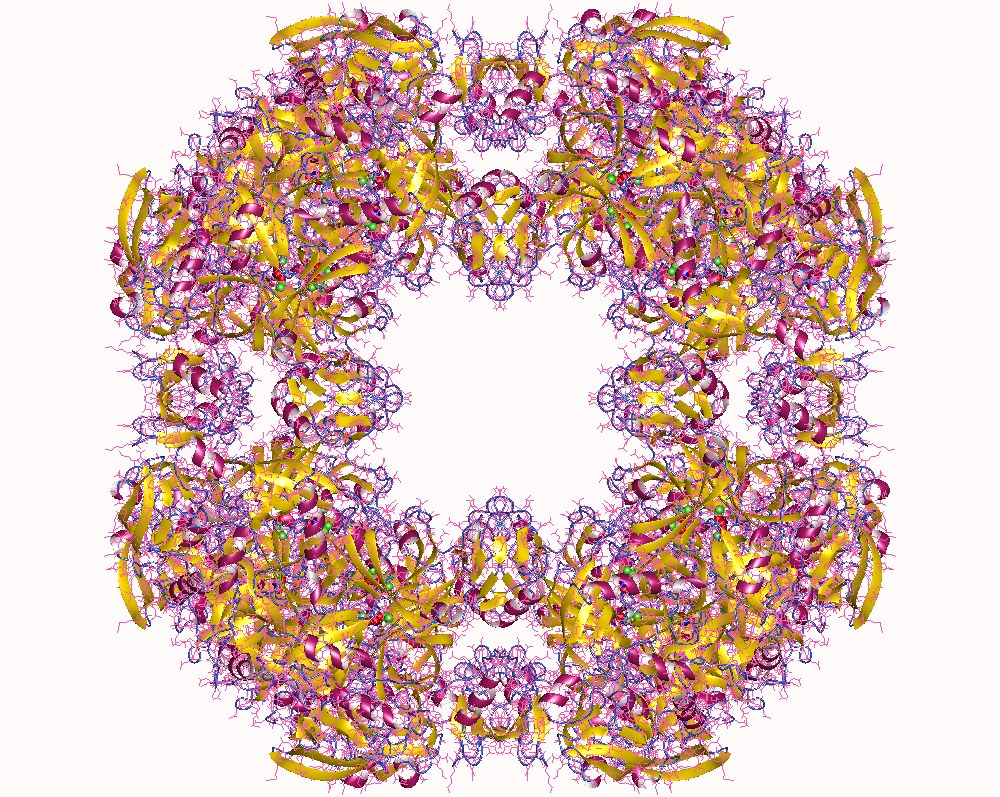
- Protease do homo24mer, E.Coli

Identifiers
- EC no.: 3.4.21.107
- CAS no.: 161108-11-8

Databases
- IntEnz: IntEnz view
- BRENDA: BRENDA entry
- ExPASy: NiceZyme view
- KEGG: KEGG entry
- MetaCyc: metabolic pathway
- PRIAM: profile
- PDB structures: RCSB PDB PDBe PDBsum
Search
- PMC: articles
- PubMed: articles
- NCBI: proteins

Peptidase Do (EC 3.4.21.107, DegP, DegP protease, HtrA, high temperature requirement protease A, HrtA heat shock protein, protease Do, Do protease) is an enzyme. This enzyme catalyses the following chemical reaction

Acts on substrates that are at least partially unfolded. The cleavage site P1 residue is normally between a pair of hydrophobic residues, such as Val-Val

This Escherichia coli serine endopeptidase is essential for the clearance of denatured proteins from the inner-membrane and periplasmic space.
