= Families of Structurally Similar Proteins database =

Families of Structurally Similar Proteins or FSSP is a database of structurally superimposed proteins generated using the "Distance-matrix ALIgnment" (DALI) algorithm. The database currently contains an extended structural family for each of 330 representative protein chains. Each data set contains structural alignments of one search structure with all other structurally significantly similar proteins in the representative set (remote homologs, < 30% sequence identity), as well as all structures in the Protein Data Bank with 70-30% sequence identity relative to the search structure (medium homologs). Very close homologs (above 70% sequence identity) are excluded as they rarely have marked structural differences. The alignments of remote homologs are the result of pairwise all-against-all structural comparisons in the set of 330 representative protein chains. All such comparisons are based purely on the 3D co-ordinates of the proteins and are derived by automatic (objective) structure comparison programs. The significance of structural similarity is estimated based on statistical criteria. The FSSP database is available electronically from the EMBL file server and by anonymous ftp (file transfer protocol). The database is helpful for the comparison of protein structures.

== See also ==
- CATH
- SCOP
