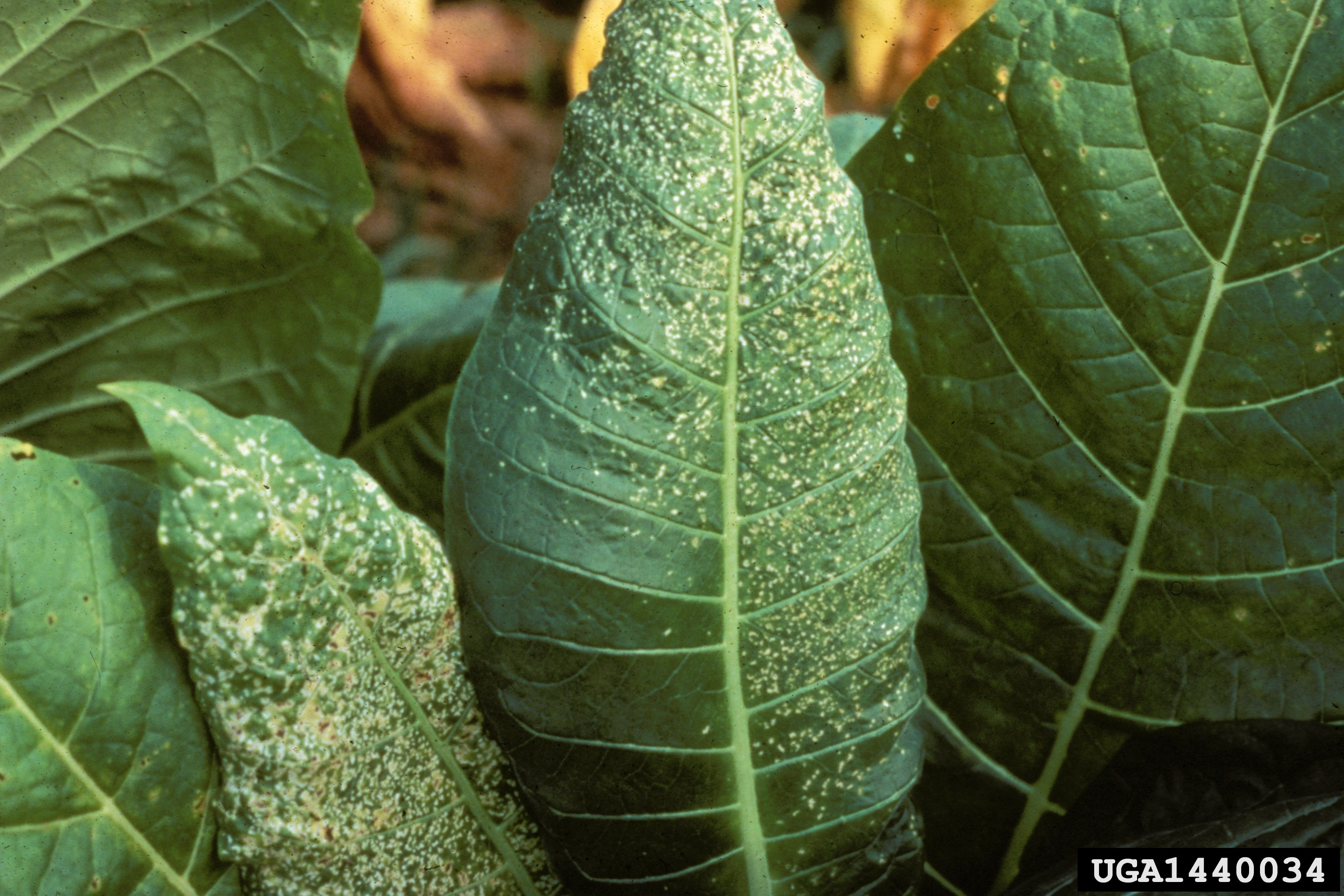
- Symptoms of tobacco etch virus in burley tobacco (Nicotiana tabacum)

Virus classification
- (unranked): Virus
- Realm: Riboviria
- Kingdom: Orthornavirae
- Phylum: Pisuviricota
- Class: Stelpaviricetes
- Order: Patatavirales
- Family: Potyviridae
- Genus: Potyvirus
- Species: Potyvirus nicotianainsculpentis

Synonyms
- datura Z virus tobacco severe etch virus tomato etch virus

= Tobacco etch virus =

Species of virus

Tobacco etch virus (TEV) is a plant virus in the genus Potyvirus and family Potyviridae. Like other members of the genus Potyvirus, TEV has a monopartite positive-sense, single-stranded RNA genome surrounded by a capsid made from a single viral encoded protein. The virus is a filamentous particle that measures about 730 nm in length. It is transmissible in a non-persistent manner by more than 10 species of aphids including Myzus persicae. It also is easily transmitted by mechanical means but is not known to be transmitted by seeds.

== Host range ==
This virus infects many species of Solanaceae. Agriculturally important crops that it infects include several species of Capsicum (i.e. C. annuum, C. frutescens), tomato (Lycopersicon esculentum), and tobacco (Nicotiana spp.).

It also infects many perennial weed species that can act as virus reservoirs for susceptible agricultural crops. These weed species include Solanum nigrum (nightshade), S. aculeatissimum (soda apple), Chenopodium album (pigweed), Datura stramonium (jimson weed), Linaria canadensis (blue toadflax), and Physalis spp. (ground cherry). Thus, recommendations for the control of this virus include the control of weeds in and around susceptible solanaceous crops.

== Signs and symptoms ==
Symptoms seen on plants infected with this virus can vary depending on the plant. However typical symptoms include vein clearing, mottling, and necrotic lines or etching. Symptoms can occur on leaves and fruit and the plants can become stunted.

Like other potyviruses, TEV makes viral inclusions that can be seen in the light microscope if properly stained. This particular potyvirus makes two kinds of inclusions that can be diagnostic in a known host. One of the inclusions is the cylindrical inclusions found in the cytoplasm of infected cells and the second inclusion is found in the nucleus. Neither inclusion type stains in the nucleic acid stain (AzureA). (Inclusions of tobacco etch virus in various hosts.)

== Geographic distribution ==
TEV appears to be a virus that evolved in the New World. It has been reported in Canada, the United States (including Hawaii), Mexico and Puerto Rico in North America and in Venezuela in South America.

== Beyond plant disease ==
Potyvirus RNA codes for at least seven different proteins. One of them is a protease. The TEV protease is a highly site-specific protease that biochemists have used to their advantage to create a protein purification system by incorporating TEV protease's recognition site into protein purification tags.

A gene construct is created containing the protein of interest fused to a TEV protease recognition site, followed by an affinity tag, such as a polyhistidine-tag. Following affinity chromatography, the purified protein is then treated with TEV protease. TEV protease cleaves at its recognition site, removing the affinity tag. This allows for affinity purification of proteins that are not well-behaved when fused to protein tags.
