= Alarmone =

An alarmone is an intracellular signal molecule that is produced in bacteria, chloroplasts, and a slim minority of archaea reacting to harsh environmental factors. They regulate the gene expression at transcription level. Alarmones are produced in high concentrations when harsh environmental factors occur in bacteria and plants, such as lack of amino acids, to produce proteins. Stringent factors take uncharged tRNA and convert it to an alarmone. Guanosine-5'-triphosphate (GTP) is then converted to 5´-diphosphate 3´-diphosphate guanosine (ppGpp), the archetypical alarmone. ppGpp will bind to RNA polymerase β and β´ subunits, changing promoter preference. It will decrease transcription of rRNA and other genes but will increase transcription of genes involved in amino acid biosyntheses and metabolisms involved in famine.
