= Catalytic triad =

Set of three coordinated amino acids

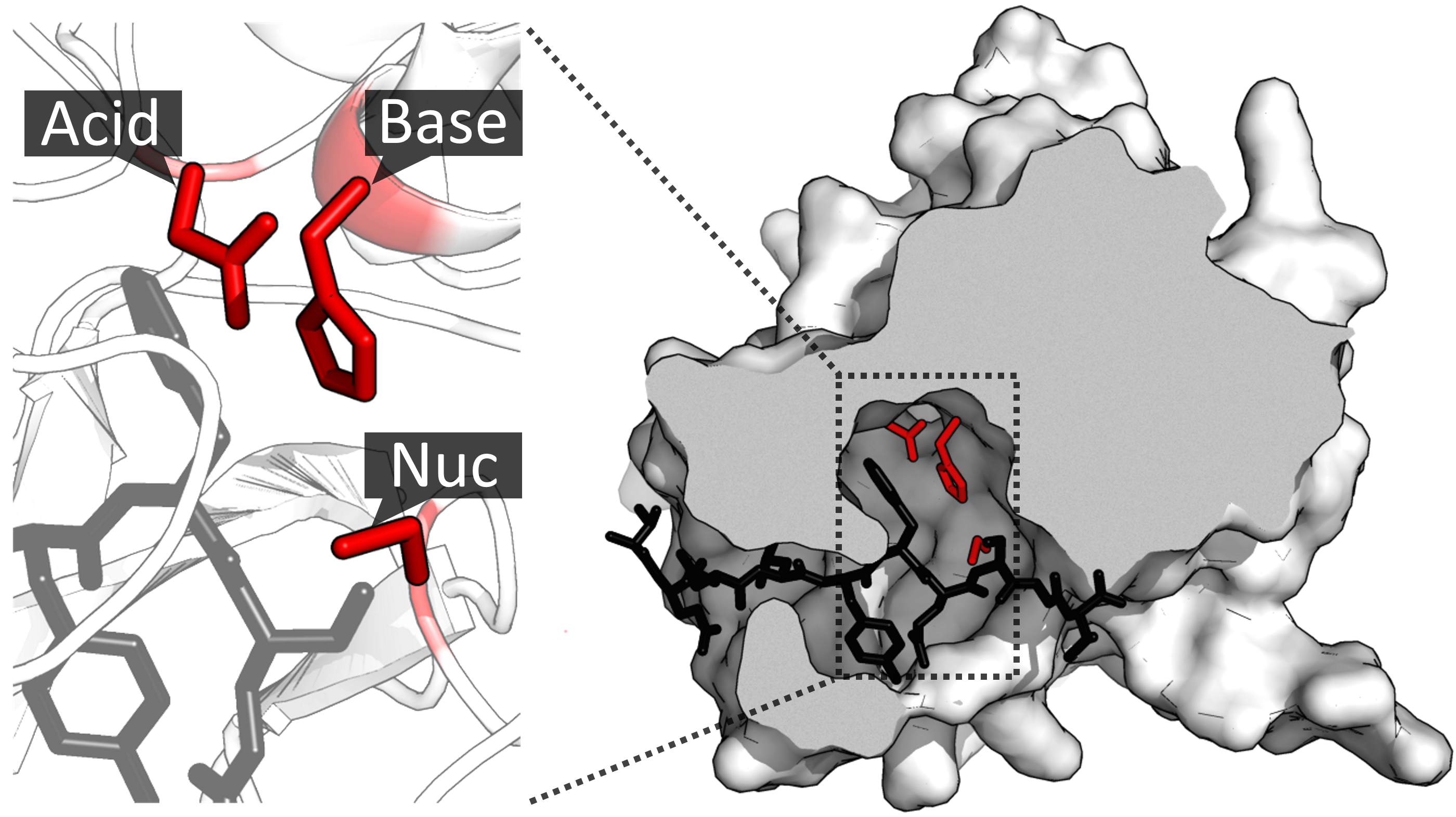
The enzyme TEV protease (Note: TEV protease MEROPS: clan PA, family C4) contains an example of a catalytic triad of residues (red) in its active site. The triad consists of an aspartate (acid), histidine (base) and cysteine (nucleophile). The substrate (black) is bound by the binding site to orient it next to the triad. (PDB: 1LVM)

A catalytic triad is a set of three coordinated amino acid residues that can be found in the active site of some enzymes. Catalytic triads are most commonly found in hydrolase and transferase enzymes (e.g. proteases, amidases, esterases, acylases, lipases and β-lactamases). An acid-base-nucleophile triad is a common motif for generating a nucleophilic residue for covalent catalysis. The residues form a charge-relay network to polarise and activate the nucleophile, which attacks the substrate, forming a covalent intermediate which is then hydrolysed to release the product and regenerate free enzyme. The nucleophile is most commonly a serine or cysteine, but occasionally threonine or even selenocysteine. The 3D structure of the enzyme brings together the triad residues in a precise orientation, even though they may be far apart in the sequence (primary structure).

As well as divergent evolution of function (and even the triad's nucleophile), catalytic triads show some of the best examples of convergent evolution. Chemical constraints on catalysis have led to the same catalytic solution independently evolving in at least 23 separate superfamilies. Their mechanism of action is consequently one of the best studied in biochemistry.

== History ==
In the 1950s, a serine residue was identified as the catalytic nucleophile of trypsin and chymotrypsin (first purified in the 1930s) by diisopropyl fluorophosphate modification. The structure of chymotrypsin was solved by X-ray crystallography in the 1960s, showing the orientation of the catalytic triad in the active site. Other proteases were sequenced and aligned to reveal a family of related proteases, now called the S1 family. Simultaneously, the structures of the evolutionarily unrelated papain and subtilisin proteases were found to contain analogous triads. The 'charge-relay' mechanism for the activation of the nucleophile by the other triad members was proposed in the late 1960s. As more protease structures were solved by X-ray crystallography in the 1970s and 80s, homologous (such as TEV protease) and analogous (such as papain) triads were found. The MEROPS classification system in the 1990s and 2000s began classing proteases into structurally related enzyme superfamilies and so acts as a database of the convergent evolution of triads in over 20 superfamilies. Understanding how chemical constraints on evolution led to the convergence of so many enzyme families on the same triad geometries has developed in the 2010s.

Researchers have since conducted increasingly detailed investigations of the triad's exact catalytic mechanism. Of particular contention in the 1990s and 2000s was whether low-barrier hydrogen bonding contributed to catalysis, or whether ordinary hydrogen bonding is sufficient to explain the mechanism. The massive body of work on the charge-relay, covalent catalysis used by catalytic triads has led to the mechanism being the best characterised in all of biochemistry.

== Function ==
Enzymes that contain a catalytic triad use it for one of two reaction types: either to split a substrate (hydrolases) or to transfer one portion of a substrate over to a second substrate (transferases). Triads are an inter-dependent set of residues in the active site of an enzyme and act in concert with other residues (e.g. binding site and oxyanion hole) to achieve nucleophilic catalysis. These triad residues act together to make the nucleophile member highly reactive, generating a covalent intermediate with the substrate that is then resolved to complete catalysis.

=== Mechanism ===
Catalytic triads perform covalent catalysis using a residue as a nucleophile. The reactivity of the nucleophilic residue is increased by the functional groups of the other triad members. The nucleophile is polarised and oriented by the base, which is itself bound and stabilised by the acid.

Catalysis is performed in two stages. First, the activated nucleophile attacks the carbonyl carbon and forces the carbonyl oxygen to accept an electron pair, leading to a tetrahedral intermediate. The resulting build-up of negative charge is typically stabilized by an oxyanion hole within the active site. The intermediate then collapses back to a carbonyl, ejecting the first half of the substrate, but leaving the second half still covalently bound to the enzyme as an acyl-enzyme intermediate. Although general-acid catalysis for breakdown of the First and Second tetrahedral intermediate may occur by the path shown in the diagram, evidence supporting such a mechanism with chymotrypsin has been controverted.

The second stage of catalysis is the resolution of the acyl-enzyme intermediate by the attack of a second substrate. If the substrate is water then hydrolysis results; if it is an organic molecule then that molecule is transferred onto the first substrate. Attack by the second substrate forms a new tetrahedral intermediate, which resolves by ejecting the enzyme's nucleophile, releasing the second product and regenerating free enzyme.

General reaction mechanism of catalysed by a catalytic triad (black): nucleophilic substitution at a carbonyl substrate (red) by a second substrate (blue). First, the enzyme's nucleophile (X) attacks the carbonyl to form a covalently linked acyl-enzyme intermediate. This intermediate is then attacked by the second substrate's nucleophile (X'). If the second nucleophile is the hydroxyl of water, the result is hydrolysis, otherwise the result is group transfer of X'.

== Identity of triad members ==
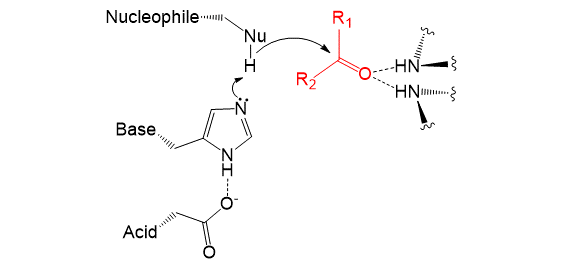
A catalytic triad charge-relay system as commonly found in proteases. The acid residue (commonly glutamate or aspartate) aligns and polarises the base (usually histidine) which activates the nucleophile (often serine or cysteine, occasionally threonine). The triad reduces the pK_{a} of the nucleophilic residue which then attacks the substrate. An oxyanion hole of positively charged usually backbone amides (occasionally side-chains) stabilise charge build-up on the substrate transition state.

=== Nucleophile ===
The side-chain of the nucleophilic residue performs covalent catalysis on the substrate. The lone pair of electrons present on the oxygen or sulfur attacks the electropositive carbonyl carbon. The 20 naturally occurring biological amino acids do not contain any sufficiently nucleophilic functional groups for many difficult catalytic reactions. Embedding the nucleophile in a triad increases its reactivity for efficient catalysis. The most commonly used nucleophiles are the hydroxyl (OH) of serine and the thiol/thiolate ion (SH/S^{−}) of cysteine. Alternatively, threonine proteases use the secondary hydroxyl of threonine, however due to steric hindrance of the side chain's extra methyl group, such proteases use their N-terminal amide as the base rather than a separate amino acid.

Use of oxygen or sulfur as the nucleophilic atom causes minor differences in catalysis. Compared to oxygen, sulfur's extra d orbital makes it larger (by 0.4 Å) and softer, allows it to form longer bonds (d_{C-X} and d_{X-H} by 1.3-fold), and gives it a lower pK_{a} (by 5 units). Serine is therefore more dependent than cysteine on optimal orientation of the acid-base triad members to reduce its pK_{a} in order to achieve concerted deprotonation with catalysis. The low pK_{a} of cysteine works to its disadvantage in the resolution of the first tetrahedral intermediate as unproductive reversal of the original nucleophilic attack is the more favourable breakdown product. The triad base is therefore preferentially oriented to protonate the leaving group amide to ensure that it is ejected to leave the enzyme sulfur covalently bound to the substrate N-terminus. Finally, resolution of the acyl-enzyme (to release the substrate C-terminus) requires serine to be re-protonated whereas cysteine can leave as S^{−}. Sterically, the sulfur of cysteine also forms longer bonds and has a bulkier van der Waals radius and if mutated to serine can be trapped in unproductive orientations in the active site.

Very rarely, the selenium atom of the uncommon amino acid selenocysteine is used as a nucleophile. The deprotonated Se^{−} state is strongly favoured when in a catalytic triad.

=== Base ===
Since no natural amino acids are strongly nucleophilic, the base in a catalytic triad polarises and deprotonates the nucleophile to increase its reactivity. Additionally, it protonates the first product to aid leaving group departure.

The base is most commonly histidine since its pK_{a} allows for effective base catalysis, hydrogen bonding to the acid residue, and deprotonation of the nucleophile residue. β-lactamases such as TEM-1 use a lysine residue as the base. Because lysine's pK_{a} is so high (pK_{a}=11), a glutamate and several other residues act as the acid to stabilise its deprotonated state during the catalytic cycle. Threonine proteases use their N-terminal amide as the base, since steric crowding by the catalytic threonine's methyl prevents other residues from being close enough.

=== Acid ===
The acidic triad member forms a hydrogen bond with the basic residue, leading to mutual alignment via restriction of the basic residue's side-chain rotation. The positive charge on the basic residue is simultaneously stabilised, leading to its polarisation. Two amino acids have acidic side chains at physiological pH (aspartate or glutamate) and so are the most common members of the acidic triad residue. Cytomegalovirus protease (Note: Cytomegalovirus protease MEROPS: clan SH, family S21) uses a pair of histidines, one as the base, as usual, and one as the acid. The second histidine is not as effective an acid as the more common aspartate or glutamate, leading to a lower catalytic efficiency.

== Examples of triads ==
The range of amino acid residues found at the active sites of hydrolytic enzymes. On the left are the nucleophile, base and acid triad members. On the right are substrates with the cleavable bond indicated by a pair of scissors. Two bonds in beta-lactams can be cleaved (1 by penicillin acylase and 2 by beta-lactamase).

=== Ser-His-Asp ===
The Serine-Histidine-Aspartate motif is one of the most thoroughly characterised catalytic motifs in biochemistry. The triad is exemplified by chymotrypsin, (Note: Chymotrypsin MEROPS: clan PA, family S1) a model serine protease from the PA superfamily which uses its triad to hydrolyse protein backbones. The aspartate is hydrogen bonded to the histidine, increasing the pK_{a} of its imidazole nitrogen from 7 to around 12. Histidine is thus able to act as a powerful general base, activating the serine nucleophile. The histidine base aids the first leaving group by donating a proton, and also activates the hydrolytic water substrate by abstracting a proton as the remaining OH^{−} attacks the acyl-enzyme intermediate.

The same triad has also convergently evolved in α/β hydrolases such as some lipases and esterases, however orientation of the triad members is reversed. Additionally, brain acetyl hydrolase (which has the same fold as a small G-protein) has also been found to have this triad.

=== Cys-His-Asp ===
The second most studied triad is the Cysteine-Histidine-Aspartate motif. Several families of cysteine proteases use this triad set, for example TEV protease and papain. (Note: Papain MEROPS: clan CA, family C1) The triad acts similarly to serine protease triads, with a few notable differences. Due to cysteine's low pK_{a}, the importance of the Asp to catalysis varies and several cysteine proteases are effectively Cys-His dyads (e.g. hepatitis A virus protease), whilst in others the cysteine is already deprotonated before catalysis begins (e.g. papain). This triad is also used by some amidases, such as N-glycanase to hydrolyse non-peptide C-N bonds.

=== Ser-His-His ===
The triad of cytomegalovirus protease uses histidine as both the acid and base triad members. Removing the acid histidine results in only a 10-fold activity loss (compared to >10,000-fold when aspartate is removed from chymotrypsin). This triad has been interpreted as a possible way of generating a less active enzyme to control cleavage rate.

=== Ser-Glu-Asp ===
An unusual triad is found in sedolisin proteases. (Note: Sedolisin protease MEROPS: clan SB, family 53) The low pK_{a} of the glutamate carboxylate group means that it only acts as a base in the triad at very low pH. The triad is hypothesised to be an adaptation to specific environments like acidic hot springs (e.g. kumamolysin) or cell lysosome (e.g. tripeptidyl peptidase).

=== Cys-His-Ser ===
The endothelial protease vasohibin (Note: Vasohibin protease MEROPS: clan CA) uses a cysteine as the nucleophile, but a serine to coordinate the histidine base. Despite the serine being a poor acid, it is still effective in orienting the histidine in the catalytic triad. Some homologues alternatively have a threonine instead of serine at the acid location.

=== Thr-Nter, Ser-Nter and Cys-Nter ===
Threonine proteases, such as the proteasome protease subunit (Note: Proteasome MEROPS: clan PB, family T1) and ornithine acyltransferases (Note: Ornithine acyltransferases MEROPS: clan PE, family T5) use the secondary hydroxyl of threonine in a manner analogous to the use of the serine primary hydroxyl. However, due to the steric interference of the extra methyl group of threonine, the base member of the triad is the N-terminal amide which polarises an ordered water which, in turn, deprotonates the catalytic hydroxyl to increase its reactivity. Similarly, there exist equivalent 'serine only' and 'cysteine only' configurations such as penicillin acylase G (Note: Penicillin acylase G MEROPS: clan PB, family S45) and penicillin acylase V (Note: Penicillin acylase V MEROPS: clan PB, family C59) which are evolutionarily related to the proteasome proteases. Again, these use their N-terminal amide as a base.

=== Ser-cisSer-Lys ===
This unusual triad occurs only in one superfamily of amidases. Here, the lysine acts to polarise the middle serine. The middle serine then forms two strong hydrogen bonds to the nucleophilic serine to activate it (one with the side chain hydroxyl and the other with the backbone amide). The middle serine is held in an unusual cis orientation to facilitate precise contacts with the other two triad residues. The triad is further unusual in that the lysine and cis-serine both act as the base in activating the catalytic serine, but the same lysine also performs the role of the acid member as well as making key structural contacts.

=== Sec-His-Glu ===
The rare, but naturally occurring amino acid selenocysteine (Sec), can also be found as the nucleophile in some catalytic triads. Selenocysteine is similar to cysteine, but contains a selenium atom instead of a sulfur. A selenocysteine residue is found in the active site of thioredoxin reductase, which uses the selenol group for reduction of disulfide in thioredoxin.

=== Engineered triads ===
In addition to naturally occurring types of catalytic triads, protein engineering has been used to create enzyme variants with non-native amino acids, or entirely synthetic amino acids. Catalytic triads have also been inserted into otherwise non-catalytic proteins, or protein mimics.

Subtilisin (a serine protease) has had its oxygen nucleophile replaced with each of sulfur, selenium, or tellurium. Cysteine and selenocysteine were inserted by mutagenesis, whereas the non-natural amino acid, tellurocysteine, was inserted using auxotrophic cells fed with synthetic tellurocysteine. These elements are all in the 16th periodic table column (chalcogens), so have similar properties. In each case, changing the nucleophile lowered the enzyme's protease activity, but increased a new activity. A sulfur nucleophile improved the enzymes transferase activity (sometimes called subtiligase). Selenium and tellurium nucleophiles converted the enzyme into an oxidoreductase. When the nucleophile of TEV protease was converted from cysteine to serine, its protease activity was strongly reduced, but it was possible to restore it by directed evolution.

Non-catalytic proteins have been used as scaffolds, having catalytic triads inserted into them which were then improved by directed evolution. The Ser-His-Asp triad has been inserted into an antibody, as well as a range of other proteins. Similarly, catalytic triad mimics have been created in small organic molecules like diaryl diselenide, and displayed on larger polymers like Merrifield resins, and self-assembling short peptide nanostructures.

== Divergent evolution ==
The sophistication of the active site network causes residues involved in catalysis (and residues in contact with these) to be highly evolutionarily conserved. However, many examples of divergent evolution in catalytic triads exist, both in the reaction catalysed, and the residues used in catalysis. The triad remains the core of the active site, but it is evolutionarily adapted to serve different functions. Some proteins, called pseudoenzymes, have non-catalytic functions (e.g. regulation by inhibitory binding) and have accumulated mutations that inactivate their catalytic triad.

=== Reaction changes ===
Catalytic triads perform covalent catalysis via an acyl-enzyme intermediate. If the intermediate is resolved by water, the result is hydrolysis of the substrate. However, if the intermediate is resolved by attack by a second substrate, then the enzyme acts as a transferase. For example, attack by an acyl group results in an acyltransferase reaction. Several families of transferase enzymes have evolved from hydrolases by adaptation to exclude water and favour attack of a second substrate. In different members of the α/β-hydrolase superfamily, the Ser-His-Asp triad is tuned by surrounding residues to perform at least 17 different reactions. Some of these reactions are also achieved with mechanisms that have altered formation, or resolution of the acyl-enzyme intermediate, or that don't proceed via an acyl-enzyme intermediate.

Additionally, an alternative transferase mechanism has been evolved by amidophosphoribosyltransferase, which has two active sites. (Note: amidophosphoribosyltransferase MEROPS: clan PB, family C44) In the first active site, a cysteine triad hydrolyses a glutamine substrate to release free ammonia. The ammonia then diffuses though an internal tunnel in the enzyme to the second active site, where it is transferred to a second substrate.

=== Nucleophile changes ===
Divergent evolution of PA clan proteases to use different nucleophiles in their catalytic triad. Shown are the serine triad of chymotrypsin and the cysteine triad of TEV protease. (PDB: 1LVM, 1GG6)

Divergent evolution of active site residues is slow, due to strong chemical constraints. Nevertheless, some protease superfamilies have evolved from one nucleophile to another. This can be inferred when a superfamily (with the same fold) contains families that use different nucleophiles. Such nucleophile switches have occurred several times during evolutionary history, however the mechanisms by which this happen are still unclear.

Within protease superfamilies that contain a mixture of nucleophiles (e.g. the PA clan), families are designated by their catalytic nucleophile (C=cysteine proteases, S=serine proteases).

Superfamilies containing a mixture of families that use different nucleophiles
Superfamily	Families	Examples
PA clan	C3, C4, C24, C30, C37, C62, C74, C99	TEV protease (Tobacco etch virus)
PA clan	S1, S3, S6, S7, S29, S30, S31, S32, S39, S46, S55, S64, S65, S75	Chymotrypsin (mammals, e.g. Bos taurus)
PB clan	C44, C45, C59, C69, C89, C95	Amidophosphoribosyltransferase precursor (Homo sapiens)
PB clan	S45, S63	Penicillin G acylase precursor (Escherichia coli)
PB clan	T1, T2, T3, T6	Archaean proteasome, beta component (Thermoplasma acidophilum)
PC clan	C26, C56	Gamma-glutamyl hydrolase (Rattus norvegicus)
PC clan	S51	Dipeptidase E (Escherichia coli)
PD clan	C46	Hedgehog protein (Drosophila melanogaster)
PD clan	N9, N10, N11	Intein-containing V-type proton ATPase catalytic subunit A (Saccharomyces cerevisiae)
PE clan	P1	DmpA aminopeptidase (Brucella anthropi)
PE clan	T5	Ornithine acetyltransferase precursor (Saccharomyces cerevisiae)

==== Pseudoenzymes ====
A further subclass of catalytic triad variants are pseudoenzymes, which have triad mutations that make them catalytically inactive, but able to function as binding or structural proteins. For example, the heparin-binding protein Azurocidin is a member of the PA clan, but with a glycine in place of the nucleophile and a serine in place of the histidine. Similarly, RHBDF1 is a homolog of the S54 family rhomboid proteases with an alanine in the place of the nucleophilic serine. In some cases, pseudoenzymes may still have an intact catalytic triad but mutations in the rest of the protein remove catalytic activity. The CA clan contains catalytically inactive members with mutated triads (calpamodulin has lysine in place of its cysteine nucleophile) and with intact triads but inactivating mutations elsewhere (rat testin retains a Cys-His-Asn triad).

Superfamilies containing pseudoenzymes with inactive triads
Superfamily	Families containing pseudoenzymes	Examples
CA clan	C1, C2, C19	Calpamodulin
CD clan	C14	CFLAR
SC clan	S9, S33	Neuroligin
SK clan	S14	ClpR
SR clan	S60	Serotransferrin domain 2
ST clan	S54	RHBDF1
PA clan	S1	Azurocidin 1
PB clan	T1	PSMB3

== Convergent evolution ==
Evolutionary convergence of serine and cysteine protease towards the same catalytic triads organisation of acid-base-nucleophile in different protease superfamilies. Shown are the triads of subtilisin, (Note: Subtilisin MEROPS: clan SB, family S8) prolyl oligopeptidase, (Note: Prolyl oligopeptidase MEROPS: clan SC, family S9) TEV protease, and papain. (PDB: 1ST2, 1LVM, 3EQ8, 1PE6)

Evolutionary convergence of threonine proteases towards the same N-terminal active site organisation. Shown are the catalytic threonine of the proteasome and ornithine acetyltransferase. (PDB: 1VRA, 1PMA)

The enzymology of proteases provides some of the clearest known examples of convergent evolution at a molecular level. The same geometric arrangement of triad residues occurs in over 20 separate enzyme superfamilies. Each of these superfamilies is the result of convergent evolution for the same triad arrangement within a different structural fold. This is because there are limited productive ways to arrange three triad residues, the enzyme backbone and the substrate. These examples reflect the intrinsic chemical and physical constraints on enzymes, leading evolution to repeatedly and independently converge on equivalent solutions.

=== Cysteine and serine hydrolases ===
The same triad geometries been converged upon by serine proteases such as the chymotrypsin and subtilisin superfamilies. Similar convergent evolution has occurred with cysteine proteases such as viral C3 protease and papain superfamilies. These triads have converged to almost the same arrangement due to the mechanistic similarities in cysteine and serine proteolysis mechanisms.

Families of cysteine proteases

Superfamily	Families	Examples
CA	C1, C2, C6, C10, C12, C16, C19, C28, C31, C32, C33, C39, C47, C51, C54, C58, C64, C65, C66, C67, C70, C71, C76, C78, C83, C85, C86, C87, C93, C96, C98, C101	Papain (Carica papaya) and calpain (Homo sapiens)
CD	C11, C13, C14, C25, C50, C80, C84	Caspase-1 (Rattus norvegicus) and separase (Saccharomyces cerevisiae)
CE	C5, C48, C55, C57, C63, C79	Adenain (human adenovirus type 2)
CF	C15	Pyroglutamyl-peptidase I (Bacillus amyloliquefaciens)
CL	C60, C82	Sortase A (Staphylococcus aureus)
CM	C18	Hepatitis C virus peptidase 2 (hepatitis C virus)
CN	C9	Sindbis virus-type nsP2 peptidase (sindbis virus)
CO	C40	Dipeptidyl-peptidase VI (Lysinibacillus sphaericus)
CP	C97	DeSI-1 peptidase (Mus musculus)
PA	C3, C4, C24, C30, C37, C62, C74, C99	TEV protease (Tobacco etch virus)
PB	C44, C45, C59, C69, C89, C95	Amidophosphoribosyltransferase precursor (Homo sapiens)
PC	C26, C56	Gamma-glutamyl hydrolase (Rattus norvegicus)
PD	C46	Hedgehog protein (Drosophila melanogaster)
PE	P1	DmpA aminopeptidase (Brucella anthropi)
unassigned	C7, C8, C21, C23, C27, C36, C42, C53, C75	

Families of serine proteases

Superfamily	Families	Examples
SB	S8, S53	Subtilisin (Bacillus licheniformis)
SC	S9, S10, S15, S28, S33, S37	Prolyl oligopeptidase (Sus scrofa)
SE	S11, S12, S13	D-Ala-D-Ala peptidase C (Escherichia coli)
SF	S24, S26	Signal peptidase I (Escherichia coli)
SH	S21, S73, S77, S78, S80	Cytomegalovirus assemblin (human herpesvirus 5)
SJ	S16, S50, S69	Lon-A peptidase (Escherichia coli)
SK	S14, S41, S49	Clp protease (Escherichia coli)
SO	S74	Phage GA-1 neck appendage CIMCD self-cleaving protein (Bacillus phage GA-1)
SP	S59	Nucleoporin 145 (Homo sapiens)
SR	S60	Lactoferrin (Homo sapiens)
SS	S66	Murein tetrapeptidase LD-carboxypeptidase (Pseudomonas aeruginosa)
ST	S54	Rhomboid-1 (Drosophila melanogaster)
PA	S1, S3, S6, S7, S29, S30, S31, S32, S39, S46, S55, S64, S65, S75	Chymotrypsin A (Bos taurus)
PB	S45, S63	Penicillin G acylase precursor (Escherichia coli)
PC	S51	Dipeptidase E (Escherichia coli)
PE	P1	DmpA aminopeptidase (Brucella anthropi)
unassigned	S48, S62, S68, S71, S72, S79, S81	

=== Threonine proteases ===
Threonine proteases use the amino acid threonine as their catalytic nucleophile. Unlike cysteine and serine, threonine is a secondary hydroxyl (i.e. has a methyl group). This methyl group greatly restricts the possible orientations of triad and substrate as the methyl clashes with either the enzyme backbone or histidine base. When the nucleophile of a serine protease was mutated to threonine, the methyl occupied a mixture of positions, most of which prevented substrate binding. Consequently, the catalytic residue of a threonine protease is located at its N-terminus.

Two evolutionarily independent enzyme superfamilies with different protein folds are known to use the N-terminal residue as a nucleophile: Superfamily PB (proteasomes using the Ntn fold) and Superfamily PE (acetyltransferases using the DOM fold) This commonality of active site structure in completely different protein folds indicates that the active site evolved convergently in those superfamilies.

Families of threonine proteases

Superfamily	Families	Examples
PB clan	T1, T2, T3, T6	Archaean proteasome, beta component (Thermoplasma acidophilum)
PE clan	T5	Ornithine acetyltransferase (Saccharomyces cerevisiae)

== See also ==
- Enzyme catalysis
- Enzyme superfamily
