= Pseudoprotease =

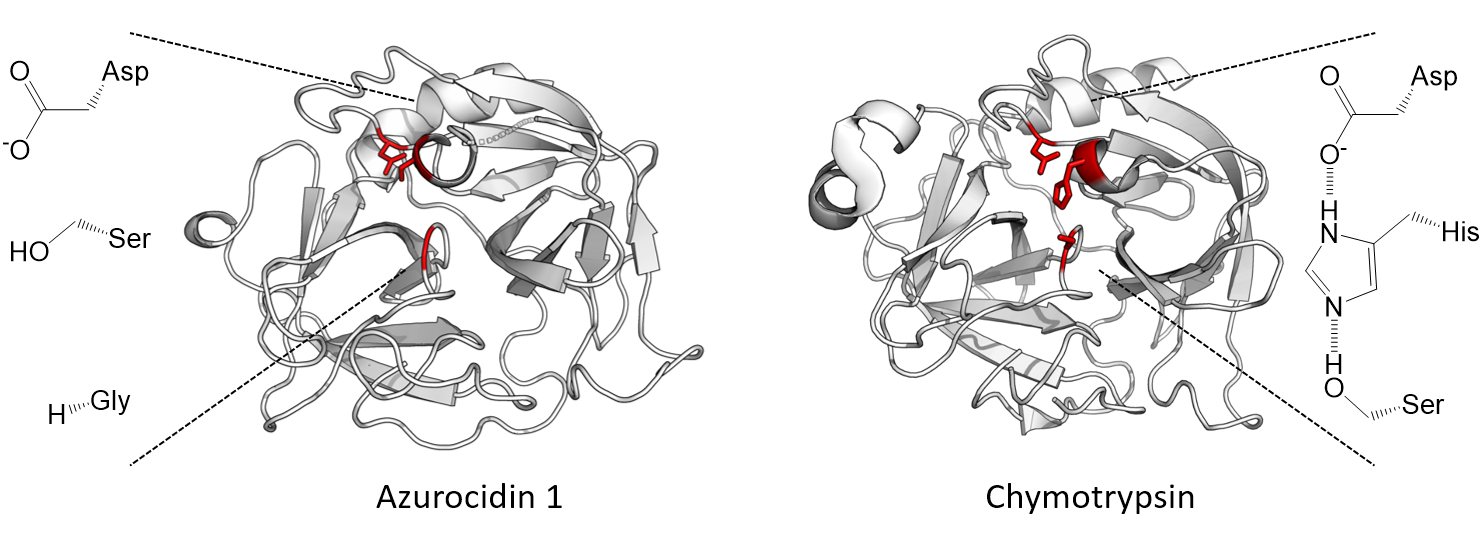
Comparison of Azurocidin 1 structure (pseudoprotease) to Chymotrypsin (functional protease) of same superfamily

Pseudoproteases are catalytically-deficient pseudoenzyme variants of proteases that are represented across the kingdoms of life.

== Examples ==
Superfamilies containing pseudoenzymes with inactive triads
Superfamily	Families containing pseudoenzymes	Examples
CA clan	C1, C2, C19	Calpamodulin
CD clan	C14	CFLAR
SC clan	S9, S33	Neuroligin
SK clan	S14	ClpR
SR clan	S60	Serotransferrin domain 2
ST clan	S54	RHBDF1
PA clan	S1	Azurocidin 1
PB clan	T1	PSMB3

== See also ==
- Protease
- Pseudoenzyme
- Catalytic triad
