= PNGase F =

Peptide-N(4)-(N-acetyl-beta-D-glucosaminyl)asparagine amidase F

Identifiers
- Organism: Elizabethkingia miricola
- Symbol: ngl
- Alt. symbols: png
- Orthologs: OMA: entry
- PDB: 1PGS
- UniProt: P21163

Other data
- EC number: 3.5.1.52
Search for
- Structures: Swiss-model
- Domains: InterPro

Peptide:N-glycosidase F, commonly referred to as PNGase F, is a bacterial amidase of the peptide-N4-(N-acetyl-beta-glucosaminyl)asparagine amidase class. PNGase F works by cleaving between the innermost GlcNAc and asparagine residues of high mannose, hybrid, and complex oligosaccharides from N-linked glycoproteins and glycopeptides. This results in a deaminated protein or peptide and a free glycan.

PNGase F has a molecular weight of 35,500 and consists of a polypeptide chain of 314 amino acids. The optimal pH for enzyme activity is 8.6. However, the activity is stable for a wide variety of conditions and reagents. PNGase F maintains 60% activity from pH 6.0 to pH 9.5. It is able to deglycosylate in the absence of denaturants, but needs extensive incubation and larger amounts of the enzyme to cleave native proteins.

Other endoglycosidases, similar to PNGase F, include endoglycosidase F1, endoglycosidase F2, endoglycosidase F3, and endoglycosidase H. These endoglycosidases have more specificity in cleavage and are less sensitive to protein conformation than PNGase F. All of these endoglycosidases, including PNGase F, can be purified from an almond emulsion or flavobacterium meningosepticum.

== Mechanism ==
PNGase F catalyzes the cleavage of an internal glycoside bond in an oligosaccharide. It cleaves all asparagine-linked complex, hybrid, or high mannose oligosaccharides unless the core GlcNAc contains an alpha 1,3- fucose.

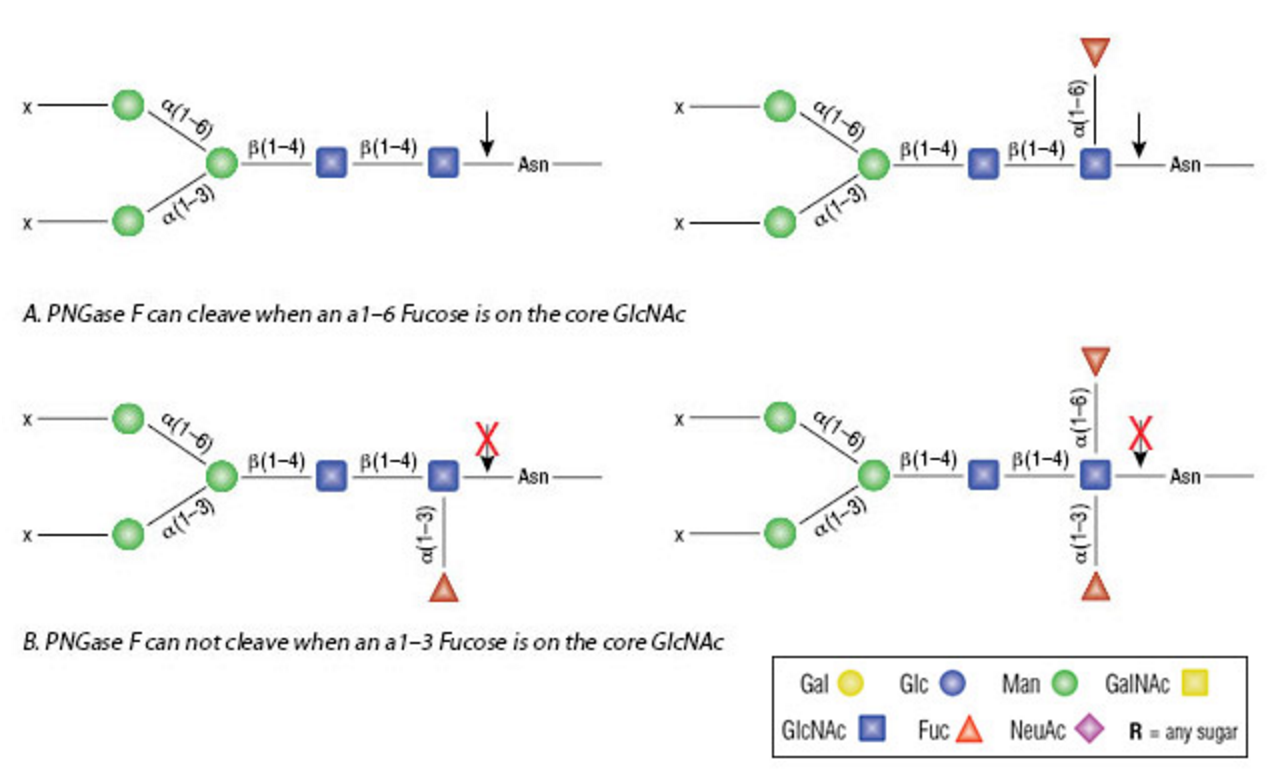
PNGase F cleavage sites.

The asparagine residue, from which the glycan is removed, is deaminated to aspartic acid.

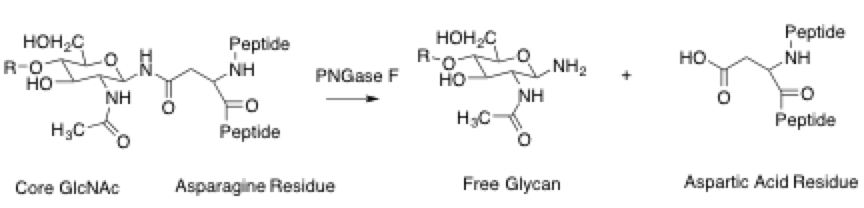
PNGase F cleaves glycan and deaminates asparagine to aspartic acid.

PNGase F requires a minimum of two GlcNAc oligosaccharide residues attached to the asparagine in order for catalysis to occur. This enzyme utilizes a catalytic triad of aspartate (60)-glutamate (206)-glutamate (118) in its active site. This motif contains a nucleophile, a proton donor, and a positive charge to stabilize the tetrahedral intermediate. The crystal structure of PNGase F from flavobacterium miningosepticum, with 1.8 Å resolution, was found to be folded in two domains, each with an eight-stranded antiparallel β barrel, or jelly roll, configuration. This structure is similar to lectins and glucanases, suggesting similarities with lectins and other carbohydrate-binding proteins.

== Applications and uses ==
Biologically, deficiencies in endoglycosidases can lead to several diseases, including lysosomal storage diseases and multisystem diseases, most of which involve the nervous system. N-linked glycans can provide structural components of cell walls and extracellular matrices, modify protein stability and solubility, direct trafficking of other glycoproteins, and mediate cell signaling (cell-cell interactions and cell-matrix interactions). N-linked glycosylation can be seen in antibodies, on cell surfaces, and on various proteins throughout the matrix. Alterations in glycosylation are often acquired in cases of cancer and inflammation, which may have important functional consequences.

To that end, PNGase F and other endoglycosidases can be used to study oligosaccharides and characterize glycoproteins. PNGase F lacks selectivity for outer carbohydrate structure, resulting in broad specificity, making it a useful tool for investigating glycoprotein structure and function. In most instances, proteins of interest are denatured and treated with PNGase F. Following this, they are either subjected to gel electrophoresis, in which protein migration changes due to the deglycosylation by PNGase F, or are analyzed via mass spectrometry, by which the oligosaccharide can be characterized and the protein or peptide fragment from which it came can be characterized.
