= Serine/threonine-specific protein kinase =

Class of protein kinase enzymes

Protein-serine/threonine kinases
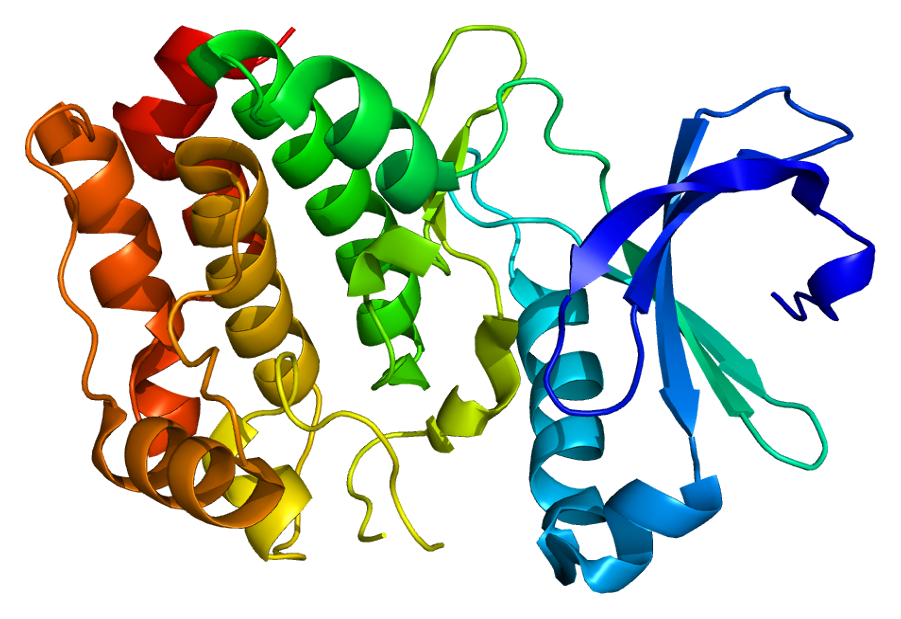
- Human Aurora Kinase PDB 1mq4

Identifiers
- EC no.: 2.7.11.-
- CAS no.: 9026-43-1

Databases
- BRENDA: enzyme data
- ExPASy: NiceZyme view
- KEGG: enzyme entry
- MetaCyc: metabolic pathway
- Rhea: reactions
- PDB structures: RCSB PDB PDBe PDBsum
- Gene Ontology: AmiGO / QuickGO
Search
- PMC: articles
- PubMed: articles
- NCBI: proteins

serine

threonine

phosphate

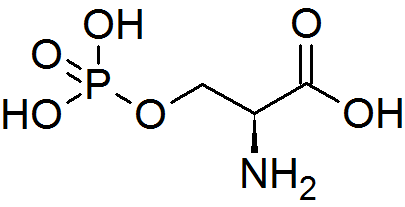
phosphoserine

A serine/threonine protein kinase (EC 2.7.11.-) is a kinase enzyme, in particular a protein kinase, that phosphorylates the OH group of the amino-acid residues serine or threonine, which have similar side chains. At least 350 of the 500+ human protein kinases are serine/threonine kinases (STK).

In enzymology, the term serine/threonine protein kinase describes a class of enzymes in the family of transferases, that transfer phosphates to the oxygen atom of a serine or threonine side chain in proteins. This process is called phosphorylation. Protein phosphorylation in particular plays a significant role in a wide range of cellular processes and is a very important post-translational modification.

The chemical reaction performed by these enzymes can be written as

ATP + a protein $\rightleftharpoons$ ADP + a phosphoprotein

Thus, the two substrates of this enzyme are ATP and a protein, whereas its two products are ADP and phosphoprotein.

The systematic name of this enzyme class is ATP:protein phosphotransferase (non-specific).

== Function ==
Serine/threonine kinases play a role in the regulation of cell proliferation, programmed cell death (apoptosis), cell differentiation, and embryonic development.

== Selectivity ==
While serine/threonine kinases all phosphorylate serine or threonine residues in their substrates, they select specific residues to phosphorylate on the basis of residues that flank the phosphoacceptor site, which together comprise the consensus sequence. Since the consensus sequence residues of a target substrate only make contact with several key amino acids within the catalytic cleft of the kinase (usually through hydrophobic forces and ionic bonds), a kinase is usually not specific to a single substrate, but instead can phosphorylate a whole "substrate family" which share common recognition sequences. While the catalytic domain of these kinases is highly conserved, the sequence variation that is observed in the kinome (the subset of genes in the genome that encode kinases) provides for recognition of distinct substrates. Many kinases are inhibited by a pseudosubstrate that binds to the kinase like a real substrate but lacks the amino acid to be phosphorylated. When the pseudosubstrate is removed, the kinase can perform its normal function.

== EC numbers ==
Many serine/threonine protein kinases do not have their own individual EC numbers and use 2.7.11.1, "non-specific serine/threonine protein kinase". This entry is for any enzyme that phosphorylates proteins while converting ATP to ADP (i.e., ATP:protein phosphotransferases.) 2.7.11.37 "protein kinase" was the former generic placeholder and was split into several entries (including 2.7.11.1) in 2005. 2.7.11.70 "protamine kinase" was merged into 2.7.11.1 in 2004.

2.7.11.- is the generic level where all serine/threonine kinases should sit in.

== Types ==
Types include those acting directly as membrane-bound receptors (Receptor protein serine/threonine kinase) and intracellular kinases participating in Signal transduction. Of the latter, types include:

EC number	Name	Description
EC 2.7.11.1	CK2, also known by the misnomer casein kinase 2	was discovered in 1954 by Burnett and Kennedy.
EC 2.7.11.1	Mos/Raf kinases	form part of the MAPKK Kinase family and are activated by growth factors. The enzyme functions to stimulate growth of cells. Raf inhibition has become the target for new anti-metastatic cancer drugs as they inhibit the MAPK cascade and reduce cell proliferation.
EC 2.7.11.1	Protein Kinase B, also known as AKT kinase	The v-akt gene was identified as the oncogene of retrovirus AKT8. The gene codes for a protein kinase. Human homologs of the AKT8 oncogenic protein were identified in 1987.By 1995 it had been found that Akt kinases function as mitogen-activated kinases downstream from cell surface receptors that activate phosphoinositide 3-kinase. Three human akt genes exist. All three Akt kinases regulate cell proliferation and Akt2 is particularly important for insulin actions in cells. A major target of Akt kinases is glycogen synthase kinase-3.
EC 2.7.11.1	Pelle	is a serine/threonine kinase that can phosphorylate itself, and also Tube and Toll.
EC 2.7.11.11	Protein kinase A	consists of two domains, a small domain with several β sheet structures and a larger domain containing several α helices. The binding sites for substrate and ATP are located in the catalytic cleft between the domains (or lobes). When ATP and substrate bind, the two lobes rotate so that the terminal phosphate group of the ATP and the target amino acid of the substrate move into the correct positions for the catalytic reaction to take place.
EC 2.7.11.13	Protein kinase C ('PKC')	is actually a family of protein kinases consisting of ~10 isozymes. They are divided into three subfamilies: conventional (or classical), novel, and atypical based on their second messenger requirements.
EC 2.7.11.24	Mitogen-activated protein kinases (MAPKs)	respond to extracellular stimuli (mitogens) and regulate various cellular activities, such as gene expression, mitosis, differentiation, and cell survival/apoptosis.
EC 2.7.11.17	Ca2+/calmodulin-dependent protein kinases or CaM kinases (CAMK)	are primarily regulated by the Ca^{2+}/calmodulin complex.
EC 2.7.11.19	Phosphorylase kinase	was in fact, the first Ser/Thr protein kinase to be discovered (in 1959 by Krebs et al.).

== Clinical significance ==
Serine/threonine kinase (STK) expression is altered in many types of cancer. Limited benefit of serine/threonine kinase inhibitors has been demonstrated in ovarian cancer.

Serine/threonine protein kinase p90-kDa ribosomal S6 kinase (RSK) is in involved in development of some prostate cancers.

Raf inhibition has become the target for new anti-metastatic cancer drugs as they inhibit the MAPK cascade and reduce cell proliferation.

== See also ==
- Protein serine/threonine phosphatase, enzyme for reverse process.
- Pseudokinase, a protein without enzyme activity (pseudoenzyme). It can be related to proteins of this class.
- ATM serine/threonine kinase, responsible for the disorder ataxia–telangiectasia.
