= Cysteine protease =

Class of enzymes

Cysteine peptidase, CA clan
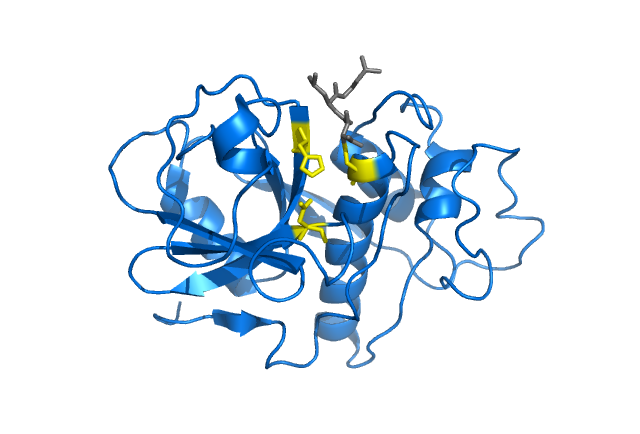
- Crystal structure of the cysteine peptidase papain in complex with its covalent inhibitor E-64. Rendered from PDB: 1PE6

Identifiers
- Symbol: Peptidase_C1
- Pfam: PF00112
- Pfam clan: CL0125
- InterPro: IPR000668
- SMART: SM00645
- PROSITE: PDOC00126
- MEROPS: C1
- SCOP2: 1aec / SCOPe / SUPFAM
- OPM superfamily: 355
- OPM protein: 1m6d
Available protein structures:
- PDB: IPR000668 PF00112 (ECOD; PDBsum)
- AlphaFold: IPR000668; PF00112

Cysteine proteases, also known as thiol proteases, are hydrolase enzymes that degrade proteins. These proteases share a common catalytic mechanism that involves a nucleophilic cysteine thiol in a catalytic triad or dyad.

Discovered by Gopal Chunder Roy in 1873, the first cysteine protease to be isolated and characterized was papain, obtained from Carica papaya. Cysteine proteases are commonly encountered in fruits including the papaya, pineapple, fig, and kiwifruit. The proportion of protease tends to be higher when the fruit is unripe. In fact, the latex of dozens of different plant families are known to contain cysteine proteases. Cysteine proteases are used as an ingredient in meat tenderizers.

== Classification ==
The MEROPS protease classification system counts 14 superfamilies plus several currently unassigned families (as of 2013) each containing many families. Each superfamily uses the catalytic triad or dyad in a different protein fold and so represent convergent evolution of the catalytic mechanism.

For superfamilies, P indicates a superfamily containing a mixture of nucleophile class families, and C indicates purely cysteine proteases. Within each superfamily, families are designated by their catalytic nucleophile (C denoting cysteine proteases).

Families of cysteine proteases
Superfamily	Families	Examples
CA	C1, C2, C6, C10, C12, C16, C19, C28, C31, C32, C33, C39, C47, C51, C54, C58, C64, C65, C66, C67, C70, C71, C76, C78, C83, C85, C86, C87, C93, C96, C98, C101	Papain (Carica papaya), bromelain (Ananas comosus), cathepsin K (liverwort) and calpain (Homo sapiens)
CD	C11, C13, C14, C25, C50, C80, C84	Caspase 1 (Rattus norvegicus) and separase (Saccharomyces cerevisiae)
CE	C5, C48, C55, C57, C63, C79	Adenain (human adenovirus type 2)
CF	C15	Pyroglutamyl-peptidase I (Bacillus amyloliquefaciens)
CL	C60, C82	Sortase A (Staphylococcus aureus)
CM	C18	Hepatitis C virus peptidase 2 (hepatitis C virus)
CN	C9	Sindbis virus-type nsP2 peptidase (sindbis virus)
CO	C40	Dipeptidyl-peptidase VI (Lysinibacillus sphaericus)
CP	C97	DeSI-1 peptidase (Mus musculus)
PA	C3, C4, C24, C30, C37, C62, C74, C99	TEV protease (tobacco etch virus)
PB	C44, C45, C59, C69, C89, C95	Amidophosphoribosyltransferase precursor (Homo sapiens)
PC	C26, C56	Gamma-glutamyl hydrolase (Rattus norvegicus)
PD	C46	Hedgehog protein (Drosophila melanogaster)
PE	P1	DmpA aminopeptidase (Brucella anthropi)
unassigned	C7, C8, C21, C23, C27, C36, C42, C53, C75	

== Catalytic mechanism ==
Reaction mechanism of the cysteine protease mediated cleavage of a peptide bond.

The first step in the reaction mechanism by which cysteine proteases catalyze the hydrolysis of peptide bonds is deprotonation of a thiol in the enzyme's active site by an adjacent amino acid with a basic side chain, usually a histidine residue. The next step is nucleophilic attack by the deprotonated cysteine's anionic sulfur on the substrate carbonyl carbon. In this step, a fragment of the substrate is released with an amine terminus, the histidine residue in the protease is restored to its deprotonated form, and a thioester intermediate linking the new carboxy-terminus of the substrate to the cysteine thiol is formed. Therefore, they are also sometimes referred to as thiol proteases. The thioester bond is subsequently hydrolyzed to generate a carboxylic acid moiety on the remaining substrate fragment, while regenerating the free enzyme.

== Biological importance ==
Cysteine proteases play multifaceted roles, virtually in every aspect of physiology and development. In plants they are important in growth and development and in accumulation and mobilization of storage proteins such as in seeds. In addition, they are involved in signalling pathways and in the response to biotic and abiotic stresses. In humans and other animals, they are responsible for senescence and apoptosis (programmed cell death), MHC class II immune responses, prohormone processing, and extracellular matrix remodeling important to bone development. The ability of macrophages and other cells to mobilize elastolytic cysteine proteases to their surfaces under specialized conditions may also lead to accelerated collagen and elastin degradation at sites of inflammation in diseases such as atherosclerosis and emphysema. Several viruses (such as polio and hepatitis C) express their entire genome as a single massive polyprotein and use a protease to cleave it into functional units (for example, tobacco etch virus protease).

== Regulation ==
The activity of cysteine proteases is regulated by a few general mechanisms, which includes the production of zymogens, selective expression, pH modification, cellular compartmentalization, and regulation of their enzymatic activity by endogenous inhibitors, which seemingly is the most efficient mechanism associated with the regulation of the activity of cysteine proteases.

Proteases are usually synthesized as large precursor proteins called zymogens, such as the serine protease precursors trypsinogen and chymotrypsinogen, and the aspartic protease precursor pepsinogen. The protease is activated by removal of an inhibitory segment or protein. Activation occurs once the protease is delivered to a specific intracellular compartment (for example the lysosome) or extracellular environment (for example the stomach). This system prevents the cell that produces the protease from being damaged by it.

Protease inhibitors are usually proteins with domains that enter or block a protease active site to prevent substrate access. In competitive inhibition, the inhibitor binds to the active site, thus preventing enzyme-substrate interaction. In non-competitive inhibition, the inhibitor binds to an allosteric site, which alters the active site and makes it inaccessible to the substrate.

Examples of protease inhibitors include:

- Serpins
- Stefins
- IAPs

== Uses ==
=== Potential pharmaceuticals ===
Currently there is no widespread use of cysteine proteases as approved and effective anthelmintics but research into the subject is a promising field of study. Plant cysteine proteases isolated from these plants have been found to have high proteolytic activities that are known to digest nematode cuticles, with very low toxicity. Successful results have been reported against nematodes such as Heligmosomoides bakeri, Trichinella spiralis, Nippostrongylus brasiliensis, Trichuris muris, and Ancylostoma ceylanicum; the tapeworm Rodentolepis microstoma, and the porcine acanthocephalan parasite Macracanthorhynchus hirundinaceus. A useful property of cysteine proteases is the resistance to acid digestion, allowing possible oral administration. They provide an alternative mechanism of action to current anthelmintics and the development of resistance is thought to be unlikely because it would require a complete change of structure of the helminth cuticle.

In several traditional medicines, the fruits or latex of the papaya, pineapple and fig are widely used for treatment of intestinal worm infections both in humans and livestock.

=== Other ===
Cysteine proteases are used as feed additives for livestock to improve the digestibility of proteins and amino acids.

== See also ==
- Protease
  - Serine protease
  - Threonine protease
  - Aspartic protease
  - Metalloprotease
- Enzyme
- Proteolysis
- Catalytic triad
- Convergent evolution
- PA clan
- The Proteolysis Map
- Protease inhibitor (pharmacology)
- Protease inhibitor (biology)
- TopFIND – database of protease specificity, substrates, products and inhibitors
- MEROPS – database of protease evolutionary groups
