= VASH2 =

Protein-coding gene in humans

Identifiers
- Aliases: VASH2, vasohibin 2
- External IDs: OMIM: 610471; MGI: 2444826; GeneCards: VASH2
Enzyme activity
EC #	BRENDA	ExPASy	KEGG	MetaCyc
3.4.17.17	↗	↗	↗	↗

Gene location (Human)
Chr.	Chromosome 1 (human)
Band	1q32.3	Start	212,950,520 bp
Band	1q32.3	End	212,992,037 bp

Gene location (Mouse)
Chr.	Chromosome 1 (mouse)
Band	1|1 H6	Start	190,679,843 bp
Band	1|1 H6	End	190,711,493 bp
RNA expression pattern
Bgee	Human / Mouse (ortholog); Top expressed in: sperm; ganglionic eminence; testicle; left testis; right testis; gonad; parietal pleura; ventricular zone; buccal mucosa cell; tibia / Top expressed in: seminiferous tubule; atrium; mandibular prominence; superior cervical ganglion; hand; endocardial cushion; maxillary prominence; neural tube; barrel cortex; ganglionic eminence; More reference expression data
BioGPS	n/a
Gene ontology
Molecular function	actin binding; metallocarboxypeptidase activity; protein binding; carboxypeptidase activity; peptidase activity; hydrolase activity
Cellular component	cytoplasm; extracellular region
Biological process	positive regulation of endothelial cell proliferation; positive regulation of angiogenesis; regulation of angiogenesis; plasma membrane fusion; syncytium formation by plasma membrane fusion; placenta blood vessel development; labyrinthine layer development; labyrinthine layer blood vessel development; proteolysis; cell-cell fusion
Sources:Amigo / QuickGO
Orthologs
Databases	NCBI: entry; OMA: entry
Species	Human	Mouse
Entrez	79805	226841
Ensembl	ENSG00000143494	ENSMUSG00000037568
UniProt	Q86V25	Q8C5G2
RefSeq (mRNA)	NM_001136474; NM_001136475; NM_001301056; NM_024749	NM_144879
RefSeq (protein)	NP_001129946; NP_001129947; NP_001287985; NP_079025	NP_659128
Location (UCSC)	Chr 1: 212.95 – 212.99 Mb	Chr 1: 190.68 – 190.71 Mb
PubMed search
- Wikidata
View/Edit Human	View/Edit Mouse

Vasohibin-2 (VASH2) is a multifaceted protein that in humans is encoded by the VASH2 gene. As a vasohibin protein, VASH2 is closely associated with the vascular endothelial growth factor (VEGF) family of proteins as well. VASH2 has therefore been implicated in playing a vital role in blood vessel generation (angiogenesis), especially as it relates to tumor growth, but it has also been observed in association with neuron differentiation as well as ameliorating the symptoms of diabetic nephropathology (kidney disease).

== Function ==
=== Angiogenesis ===
VASH2 is highly similar in structure (over 50% similarity) to the protein vasohibin-1 (VASH-1) which is produced by endothelial cells; therefore, VASH2 is considered a structural homolog of VASH-1. However, while VASH-1 has been shown to antagonize angiogenesis (encourage termination of blood vessel formation), VASH2 has been shown to promote angiogenesis, especially in invasive tumor cell types such as pancreatic and breast carcinomas. VASH2 is released in response to low oxygen (hypoxic) environments, such as those that surround tumors growths that have not yet metastasized. When VASH2 is released by the tumor cells in a hypoxia-induced mechanism, the tumor induces blood vessels to branch off and provide the tumor cells with nutrients. This is also how tumor cells are able to spread from one mass of cells into other organs. Therefore, angiogenesis is one of the first landmarks of metastasis. When VASH2 knockdown tumor cells were observed in vitro, there was no effect on actual cell numbers, but tumor size was severely inhibited, and this was determined to be due to reduced angiogenesis to the tumor cell. This indicates that VASH2 plays a vital role in angiogenesis.
