= Low-density-lipoprotein receptor kinase =

Kinase enzyme involved in cholesterol homeostasis

low-density lipoprotein kinase

Identifiers
- EC no.: 2.7.11.29
- CAS no.: 107445-00-1

Databases
- IntEnz: IntEnz view
- BRENDA: BRENDA entry
- ExPASy: NiceZyme view
- KEGG: KEGG entry
- MetaCyc: metabolic pathway
- PRIAM: profile
- PDB structures: RCSB PDB PDBe PDBsum
- Gene Ontology: AmiGO / QuickGO
Search
- PMC: articles
- PubMed: articles
- NCBI: proteins

In enzymology, a low-density-lipoprotein receptor kinase (EC 2.7.11.29) is an enzyme that catalyzes the chemical reaction

ATP + [low-density-lipoprotein receptor]-L-serine $\rightleftharpoons$ ADP + [low-density-lipoprotein receptor]-O-phospho-L-serine

Thus, the two substrates of this enzyme are ATP and [[[low-density-lipoprotein receptor]-L-serine]], whereas its two products are ADP and [[[low-density-lipoprotein receptor]-O-phospho-L-serine]].

This enzyme belongs to the family of transferases, specifically those transferring a phosphate group to the sidechain oxygen atom of serine or threonine residues in proteins (protein-serine/threonine kinases). The systematic name of this enzyme class is ATP:[low-density-lipoprotein receptor]-L-serine O-phosphotransferase. Other names in common use include ATP:low-density-lipoprotein-L-serine O-phosphotransferase, LDL receptor kinase, [low-density-lipoprotein] kinase, low-density lipoprotein kinase, low-density-lipoprotein receptor kinase (phosphorylating), and STK7.
