= HBP =

HBP most commonly refers to:

- High blood pressure or hypertension

HBP may also refer to:

- Heparin-binding protein or azurocidin 1, protein-coding gene in the species Homo sapiens
- Hairpin-binding protein, protein-coding gene in humans
- Human Brain Project, scientific research project
- Harvard Business Publishing, US publishing company
- Hit by pitch, baseball event in which the batter is hit by the pitched ball
- Hornbeam Park railway station, railway station in North Yorkshire, England
- Home buyers' plan, type of financial account in Canada for holding savings and investment assets

== See also ==
- Harry Potter and the Half-Blood Prince
