= Low-barrier hydrogen bond =

Energy profiles for different hydrogen bond types between oxygen heteroatoms. Standard hydrogen bonds are asymmetrical, with the hydrogen being associated with one heteroatom. When the pKa between the heteroatoms is equal, a symmetrical hydrogen bond forms with the hydrogen in equilibrium between two locations. At shorter distances, the barrier between the two energy minima is low enough that the hydrogen is equally bound as a low-barrier, or single-well hydrogen bond.

A Low-barrier hydrogen bond (LBHB) is a special type of hydrogen bond. LBHBs can occur when the pKa of the two heteroatoms are closely matched, which allows the hydrogen to be more equally shared between them. This hydrogen-sharing causes the formation of especially short, strong hydrogen bonds.

== Description ==
In this aza crown-type, macrocyclic compound, a proton sits between two amide carbonyl oxygens separated by a distance of 2.45 Å.

Standard hydrogen bonds are longer (e.g. 2.8 Å for an O···O h-bond), and the hydrogen ion clearly belongs to one of the heteroatoms. When pKa of the heteroatoms is closely matched, a LBHB becomes possible at a shorter distance (~2.55 Å). When the distance further decreases (< 2.29 Å) the bond is characterized as a single-well or short-strong hydrogen bond.

== Proteins ==
Low barrier hydrogen bonds occur in the water-excluding environments of proteins. Multiple residues act together in a charge-relay system to control the pKa values of the residues involved. LBHBs also occur on the surfaces of proteins, but are unstable due to their proximity to bulk water, and the conflicting requirements of strong salt-bridges in protein-protein interfaces.

=== Enzyme catalysis ===
Low-barrier hydrogen bonds have been proposed to be relevant to enzyme catalysis in two types of circumstance. Firstly, a low-barrier hydrogen bond in a charge relay network within an active site could activate a catalytic residue (e.g. between acid and base within a catalytic triad). Secondly, an LBHB could form during catalysis to stabilise a transition state (e.g. with substrate transition state in an oxyanion hole). Both of these mechanisms are contentious, with theoretical and experimental evidence split on whether they occur. Since the 2000s, the general consensus has been that LBHBs are not used by enzymes to aid catalysis. However, in 2012, a low-barrier hydrogen bond has been proposed to be involved in phosphate-arsenate discrimination for a phosphate transport protein. This finding might indicate the possibility of low-barrier hydrogen bonds playing a catalytic role in ion size selection for some very rare cases.
