= Acetylglutamate synthetase =

Acetylglutamate synthetase may refer to:

- Amino-acid N-acetyltransferase
- Glutamate N-acetyltransferase
