= VanY protein domain =

VanY

Identifiers
- Symbol: VanY
- Pfam: PF02557
- Pfam clan: CL0170
- InterPro: IPR003709
- MEROPS: M15
Available protein structures:
- PDB: IPR003709 PF02557 (ECOD; PDBsum)
- AlphaFold: IPR003709; PF02557

In molecular biology, VanY are protein domains found in enzymes named metallopeptidases. They are vital to bacterial cell wall synthesis and antibiotic resistance.

== Function ==
VanY is involved in bacterial cell wall biosynthesis and metabolism. VanY D-Ala-D-Ala peptidases provide resistance to the antibiotic vancomycin on some strains of enterococci, and are therefore drug targets.

VanY is a Zinc-dependent D,Dcarboxypeptidase enzyme that cleaved the C-terminal residue of peptidoglycan precursors ending in R-D-Ala-D-Ala or R-D-Ala-D-Lac.

== Substrate ==
The substrate specificities of VanX and VanY ensure that essentially only precursors with low affinity for the glycopeptide antibiotics are available for peptidoglycan synthesis in resistant strains.

== Antibiotic Resistance ==
Acquired VanA- and VanB-type glycopeptide resistance in enterococci is due to synthesis of modified peptidoglycan precursors terminating in D-lactate. As opposed to VanA-type strains which are resistant to both vancomycin and teicoplanin, VanB-type strains remain teicoplanin susceptible. The vanY gene was necessary for synthesis of the vancomycin-inducible D,D-carboxypeptidase EC activity previously proposed to be responsible for glycopeptide resistance. However, this activity was not required for peptidoglycan synthesis in the presence of glycopeptides.

Bacteriophage lysins (Ply) or endolysins are phage-encoded cell wall lytic enzymes which are synthesised late during virus multiplication and mediate the release of progeny virions. Bacteriophages of the pathogen Listeria monocytogenes encode endolysin enzymes which specifically hydrolyse the cross-linking peptide bridges in Listeria peptidoglycan. Ply118 is a 30.8kDa L-alanoyl-D-glutamate peptidase and Ply511 (36.5 kDa) acts as N-acetylmuramoyl-L-alanine amidase (INTERPRO).
