= N-acetyl-L-glutamate synthetase =

N-acetyl-L-glutamate synthetase may refer to:

- N-Acetylglutamate synthase
- Glutamate N-acetyltransferase
