= EP-B2 =

Endoprotease B, isoform 2 (EP-B2) is a cysteine protease found in barley. In studies, it has shown promise as a possible therapeutic for coeliac disease. Aspergillopepsin from Aspergillus niger has been shown to enhance the effects of EP-B2.
