= Calpain-6 =

Protein-coding gene in humans

CAPN6

Identifiers
- Aliases: CAPN6, CANPX, CAPNX, CalpM, DJ914P14.1, calpain 6, calpamodulin
- External IDs: OMIM: 300146; MGI: 1100850; GeneCards: CAPN6

Gene location (Human)
Chr.	X chromosome (human)
Band	Xq23	Start	111,245,099 bp
Band	Xq23	End	111,270,483 bp

Gene location (Mouse)
Chr.	X chromosome (mouse)
Band	X|X F2	Start	142,585,227 bp
Band	X|X F2	End	142,610,410 bp
RNA expression pattern
Bgee	Human / Mouse (ortholog); Top expressed in: tail of epididymis; caput epididymis; tibia; corpus epididymis; placenta; seminal vesicula; cartilage tissue; gallbladder; body of uterus; rectum / Top expressed in: mandibular prominence; condyle; efferent ductule; saccule; atrium; hand; human fetus; fossa; maxillary prominence; genital tubercle; More reference expression data
BioGPS	n/a
Gene ontology
Molecular function	microtubule binding; calcium-dependent cysteine-type endopeptidase activity
Cellular component	cytoplasm; perinuclear region of cytoplasm; spindle; spindle microtubule; microtubule; intracellular anatomical structure; cytoskeleton; cytosol
Biological process	regulation of cytoskeleton organization; microtubule bundle formation; proteolysis
Sources:Amigo / QuickGO
Orthologs
Databases	NCBI: entry; OMA: entry
Species	Human	Mouse
Entrez	827	12338
Ensembl	ENSG00000077274	ENSMUSG00000067276
UniProt	Q9Y6Q1	O35646
RefSeq (mRNA)	NM_014289	NM_007603
RefSeq (protein)	NP_055104	NP_031629
Location (UCSC)	Chr X: 111.25 – 111.27 Mb	Chr X: 142.59 – 142.61 Mb
PubMed search
- Wikidata
View/Edit Human	View/Edit Mouse

Calpain-6 (also known as calpamodulin) is a protein in humans that is encoded by the CAPN6 gene.

Calpains are a ubiquitous, well-conserved family of calcium-dependent, cysteine proteases. In the MEROPS protease enzyme classification system, they are members of clan CA (papain-like proteases). The calpain proteins are heterodimers consisting of an invariant small subunit and variable large subunits. The large subunit possesses a cysteine protease domain, and both subunits possess calcium-binding domains. Calpains have been implicated in neurodegenerative processes, as their activation can be triggered by calcium influx and oxidative stress. The protein encoded by this gene is highly expressed in the placenta. Its C-terminal region lacks any homology to the calmodulin-like domain of other calpains. The protein lacks a critical catalytic triad residue in its active site (cysteine nucleophile mutated to lysine) and thus is suggested to be proteolytically inactive. The protein may play a role in tumor formation by inhibiting apoptosis and promoting angiogenesis.
