= Pseudokinase =

Catalytically-deficient pseudoenzyme

Pseudokinases are catalytically-deficient pseudoenzyme variants of protein kinases that are represented in all kinomes across the kingdoms of life. Pseudokinases have both physiological (signal transduction) and pathophysiological functions.

== History ==
The phrase pseudokinase was first coined in 2002. They were subsequently sub-classified into different 'classes'. Several pseudokinase-containing families are found in the human kinome, including the Tribbles pseudokinases, which are at the interface between kinase and ubiquitin E3 ligase signalling.

The human pseudokinases (and their pseudophosphatase cousins) are implicated in a wide variety of diseases, which has made them potential drug targets and antitargets. Pseudokinases are made up of an evolutionary mixture of eukaryotic protein kinase (ePK) and non ePK-related pseudoenzyme proteins (e.g., FAM20A, which binds ATP and is pseudokinase due to a conserved glutamate to glutamine swap in the alpha-C helix. FAM20A is implicated in periodontal disease, and serves to control the catalytic activity of FAM20C, an important physiological casein kinase that controls phosphorylation of proteins in the Golgi apparatus that are destined for secretion, such as the milk protein casein.

A comprehensive evolutionary analysis confirms that pseudokinases group into multiple subfamilies, and these are found in the annotated kinome of organisms across the kingdoms of life, including prokaryotes, archaea and all eukaryotic lineages with an annotated proteome; this data is searchable in ProKino (http://vulcan.cs.uga.edu/prokino/about/browser). Some pseudokinases can still bind to ATP, or catalyse an atypical reaction involving migrated catalytic residues; moreover structural prediction algorithms such as AlphaFold can be used to analyse pseudokinase folding Some pseudokinases show species specific adaptions, including the vertebrate pseudokinase PSKH2, which like the closely related secretory-pathway Ser/Thr kinase PSKH1 is a client of the HSP90 molecular chaperone system in human cells.

== See also ==
- Kinase
- Pseudoenzyme
- Phosphatome
- Protein phosphatase
