= Kinome =

Set of all protein kinases encoded in a genome

In molecular biology, biochemistry and cell signaling the kinome of an organism is the complete set of protein kinases encoded in its genome. Kinases are usually enzymes that catalyze phosphorylation reactions (of amino acids) and fall into several groups and families, e.g., those that phosphorylate the amino acids serine and threonine, those that phosphorylate tyrosine and some that can phosphorylate both, such as the MAP2K and GSK families. The term was first used in 2002 by Gerard Manning and colleagues in twin papers analyzing the 518 human protein kinases, and refers to both protein kinases and protein pseudokinases and their evolution of protein kinases throughout the eukaryotes. Other kinomes have been determined for rice, several fungi, nematodes, and insects, sea urchins, Dictyostelium discoideum, and the process of infection by Mycobacterium tuberculosis. Although the primary sequence of protein kinases shows substantial divergence between unrelated eukaryotes, and amino acid differences in catalytic motifs have permitted their separation of kinomes into canonical and pseudokinase subtypes, the variation found in the amino acid motifs adjacent to the site of actual phosphorylation of substrates by eukaryotic kinases is much smaller.

As kinases are a major drug target and a major control point in cell behavior, the kinome has also been the target of large scale functional genomics with RNAi screens and of drug discovery efforts, especially in cancer therapeutics.

In animals, the kinome includes kinases that phosphorylate only tyrosine (tyrosine kinases), those that act on serine or threonine, and a few classes, such as GSK3 and MAP2K that can act on both. Research has shown that there are specialized protein domains that bind to phosphorylated serine and threonine residues, such as BRCA and FHA domains.

== See also ==
- Kinase
- Pseudokinase
- Pseudoenzyme
- Phosphatome
- Protein phosphatase
