= Penicillin amidase =

Class of enzymes

Identifiers
- EC no.: 3.5.1.11
- CAS no.: 9014-06-6

Databases
- BRENDA: enzyme data
- ExPASy: NiceZyme view
- KEGG: enzyme entry
- MetaCyc: metabolic pathway
- Rhea: reactions
- PDB structures: RCSB PDB PDBe PDBsum
- Gene Ontology: AmiGO / QuickGO
Search
- PMC: articles
- PubMed: articles
- NCBI: proteins

Penicillin amidase (EC 3.5.1.11) is an enzyme that catalyzes the general chemical reaction which removes the carboxylic acid sidechain from penicillins by hydrolysis at the amide bond of 6-aminopenicillanic acid (6-APA):

a penicillin + H_{2}O $\rightleftharpoons$ a carboxylate + 6-aminopenicillanic acid

For example, in Escherichia coli, benzylpenicillin is converted to 6-APA and phenylacetic acid:

benzylpenicillin
H_{2}O
6-APA
+
phenylacetic acid

An important use of tis enzyme is to produce industrial quantities of 6-APA for conversion to other semi-synthetic penicillins, as a means of overcoming resistance to the natural antibiotics.

This enzyme is a hydrolase, one acting on carbon-nitrogen bonds other than peptide bonds, specifically in linear amides. The systematic name of this enzyme class is penicillin amidohydrolase. Other names in common use include penicillin acylase, benzylpenicillin acylase, novozym 217, semacylase, alpha-acylamino-beta-lactam acylhydrolase, and ampicillin acylase.

== Structural studies ==
As of 2026, there were 96 X-ray structures of this enzyme class in the Protein Data Bank.
