= Assemblin =

Identifiers
- EC no.: 3.4.21.97
- CAS no.: 139691-88-6

Databases
- IntEnz: IntEnz view
- BRENDA: BRENDA entry
- ExPASy: NiceZyme view
- KEGG: KEGG entry
- MetaCyc: metabolic pathway
- PRIAM: profile
- PDB structures: RCSB PDB PDBe PDBsum
Search
- PMC: articles
- PubMed: articles
- NCBI: proteins

Assemblin (EC 3.4.21.97) is an enzyme with systematic name. This enzyme catalyses the following chemical reaction

Cleaves -Ala-Ser- and -Ala-Ala- bonds in the scaffold protein

This enzyme is coded by the herpes-virus virion.
