= Bacillus virus G =

Virus classification
- (unranked): Virus
- Realm: Duplodnaviria
- Kingdom: Heunggongvirae
- Phylum: Uroviricota
- Class: Caudoviricetes
- Order: Caudovirales
- Family: Myoviridae
- Species: Bacillus virus G

Species of virus

Bacillus virus G is a bacteriophage (phage) that infects Bacillus bacteria. The phage has been reported to have the largest genome of all discovered Myoviridae with nearly 700 protein-coding genes.
