= Peptide-N4-(N-acetyl-beta-glucosaminyl)asparagine amidase =

Class of enzymes

peptide-N4-(N-acetyl-beta-glucosaminyl)asparagine amidase
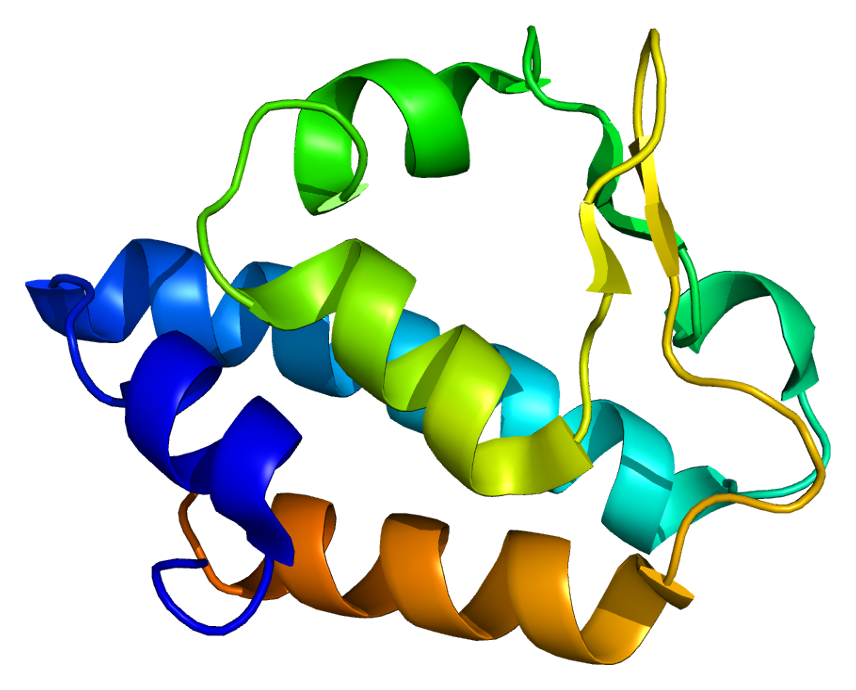
- Rendering based on PDB: 2ccq

Identifiers
- EC no.: 3.5.1.52
- CAS no.: 83534-39-8

Databases
- BRENDA: enzyme data
- ExPASy: NiceZyme view
- KEGG: enzyme entry
- MetaCyc: metabolic pathway
- Rhea: reactions
- PDB structures: RCSB PDB PDBe PDBsum
- Gene Ontology: AmiGO / QuickGO
Search
- PMC: articles
- PubMed: articles
- NCBI: proteins

In enzymology, a peptide-N4-(N-acetyl-beta-glucosaminyl)asparagine amidase (EC 3.5.1.52) is an enzyme that catalyzes a chemical reaction that cleaves a N_{4}-(acetyl-beta-D-glucosaminyl)asparagine residue in which the glucosamine residue may be further glycosylated, to yield a (substituted) N-acetyl-beta-D-glucosaminylamine and a peptide containing an aspartate residue. This enzyme belongs to the family of hydrolases, specifically those acting on carbon-nitrogen bonds other than peptide bonds in linear amides.

The NGLY1 gene encodes the ortholog of this enzyme in humans.

== Nomenclature ==
The systematic name of this enzyme class is N-linked-glycopeptide-(N-acetyl-beta-D-glucosaminyl)-L-asparagine amidohydrolase. Other names in common use include:

- glycopeptide N-glycosidase,
- glycopeptidase,
- N-oligosaccharide glycopeptidase,
- N-glycanase,
- Jack-bean glycopeptidase,
- PNGase A, and
- PNGase F

== Structural studies ==
The enzyme uses a catalytic triad of cysteine-histidine-aspartate in its active site for hydrolysis by covalent catalysis. A peptide with similar functionality was discovered in 2014 by group at Fudan University in Shanghai, China. This peptide also cleaves alpha 1,3 linkages, and has been named PNGase F-II.
