= Sortase A =

Identifiers
- EC no.: 3.4.22.70

Databases
- BRENDA: enzyme data
- ExPASy: NiceZyme view
- KEGG: enzyme entry
- MetaCyc: metabolic pathway
- Rhea: reactions
- PDB structures: RCSB PDB PDBe PDBsum
Search
- PMC: articles
- PubMed: articles
- NCBI: proteins

Sortase A (EC 3.4.22.70, SrtA, SrtA protein, SrtA sortase) is a protease. This enzyme catalyses a cell wall sorting reaction, in which a surface protein with a sorting signal containing a LPXTG motif, is cleaved between the Thr and Gly residue.

This enzyme belongs to the peptidase family C60.

== Structure ==
Sortase A has an eight stranded β-barrel fold with a hydrophobic cleft formed by β7-β8 strands. This cleft is surrounded by β3-β4, β2-β3, β6-β7, and β7-β8 loops. The catalytic cysteine residue is found in this cleft and accepts subsequent binding of a nucleophilic agent. The β3-β4 loop contains a calcium binding site which binds calcium via coordination to a residue in the β6-β7 loop. Such binding slows down the motion of the β6-β7 loop, allowing the substrate of sortase to bind and increase its activity eightfold.

== Use in protein engineering ==
Sortase A has been widely used as an in vitro tool to post-translationally modify proteins at the N- and C-termini with an appended label. These labels include biotin, fluorophores, crosslinkers, and multifunctional probes.

In both cases, one molecule is engineered to contain a LPXTG motif at one end and another molecule is engineered to contain a polyglycine, Gly_{n,} motif at another end. Upon cleavage of the LPXTG motif, sortase forms a thioester intermediate with the engineered molecule. This intermediate is then resolved by nucleophilic attack by the Gly_{n} containing molecule to form a fusion between the two molecules with an intervening LPXTG_{n} motif.

To achieve N-terminal labeling of a protein, the LPXTG motif is engineered to be at the C-terminus of the label. The protein is engineered to have an N-terminal Gly_{n}. To achieve C-terminal labeling of the same protein, the LPXTG motif is engineered to be at the C-terminus of the protein. A Gly_{n} molecule is engineered to contain the label at its C-terminus.

Finally, both N and C-termini of proteins can be labeled by using sortases of different substrate specificity. For example, SrtA from Streptococcus pyogenes recognizes and cleaves the LPXTA motif and accepts Ala-based nucleophiles. This SrtA also recognizes and cleaves the LPXTG motif with reduced efficiency. However, Staphylococcus aureus SrtA does not recognize LPXTA substrates and thus are orthogonal to the LPXTA sequence.

In addition, sortase A has also been used to piecewise create proteins, protein domains, and peptides.
