= Adenain =

Class of enzymes

Identifiers
- EC no.: 3.4.22.39
- CAS no.: 369652-03-9

Databases
- BRENDA: enzyme data
- ExPASy: NiceZyme view
- KEGG: enzyme entry
- MetaCyc: metabolic pathway
- Rhea: reactions
- PDB structures: RCSB PDB PDBe PDBsum
Search
- PMC: articles
- PubMed: articles
- NCBI: proteins

Adenain (EC 3.4.22.39) is an enzyme. This enzyme catalyses the following chemical reaction

Cleaves proteins of the adenovirus and its host cell at two consensus sites: -Yaa-Xaa-Gly-Gly-Xaa- and -Yaa-Xaa-Gly-Xaa-Gly- (in which Yaa is Met, Ile or Leu, and Xaa is any amino acid)

This cysteine endopeptidase is encoded by adenoviruses.
