= Dipeptidase E =

Identifiers
- EC no.: 3.4.13.21

Databases
- IntEnz: IntEnz view
- BRENDA: BRENDA entry
- ExPASy: NiceZyme view
- KEGG: KEGG entry
- MetaCyc: metabolic pathway
- PRIAM: profile
- PDB structures: RCSB PDB PDBe PDBsum
Search
- PMC: articles
- PubMed: articles
- NCBI: proteins

Dipeptidase E

Identifiers
- Organism: Salmonella typhimurium
- Symbol: PepE
- UniProt: P36936
Search for
- Structures: Swiss-model
- Domains: InterPro

Dipeptidase E (EC 3.4.13.21, aspartyl dipeptidase, peptidase E, PepE gene product (Salmonella typhimurium)) is an enzyme. This enzyme catalyses the following chemical reaction

Dipeptidase E catalyses the hydrolysis of dipeptides Asp!Xaa. It does not act on peptides with N-terminal Glu, Asn or Gln, nor does it cleave isoaspartyl peptides

A free carboxy group is not absolutely required in the substrate.
