= Azurocidin 1 =

Protein-coding gene in the species Homo sapiens

AZU1
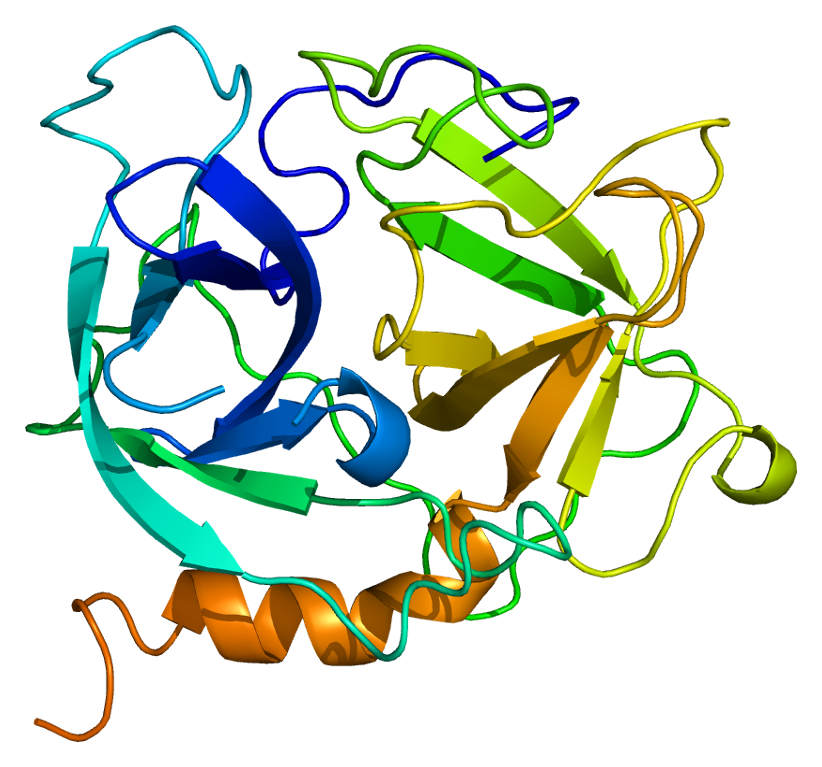

Identifiers
- Aliases: AZU1, AZAMP, AZU, CAP37, HBP, HUMAZUR, NAZC, hHBP, azurocidin 1
- External IDs: OMIM: 162815; GeneCards: AZU1
Available structures
PDB	Human UniProt search: PDBe RCSB
PDB	List of PDB id codes 1A7S, 1AE5, 1FY1, 1FY3

Gene location (Human)
Chr.	Chromosome 19 (human)
Band	19p13.3	Start	825,097 bp
Band	19p13.3	End	832,018 bp
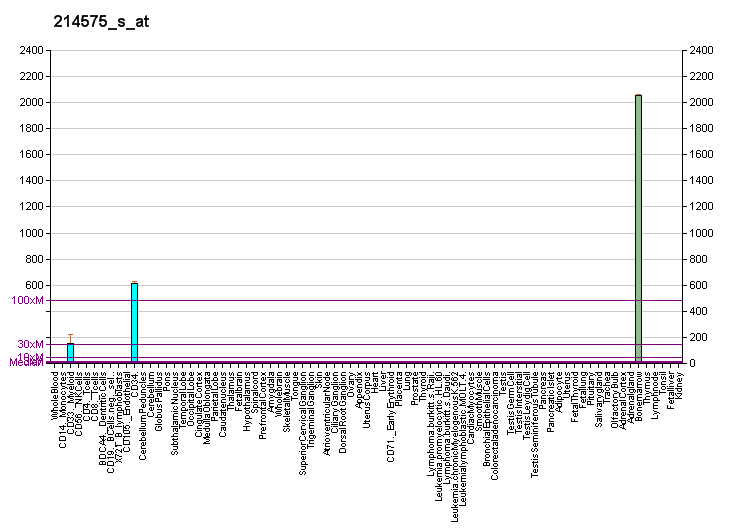
RNA expression pattern
Bgee	Human / Mouse (ortholog); Top expressed in: bone marrow; bone marrow cell; monocyte; blood; granulocyte; spleen; right uterine tube; right lung; ganglionic eminence; olfactory zone of nasal mucosa / n/a; More reference expression data
BioGPS	More reference expression data
Gene ontology
Molecular function	heparin binding; peptidase activity; protein binding; heparan sulfate proteoglycan binding; toxic substance binding; serine-type endopeptidase activity
Cellular component	membrane; azurophil granule; azurophil granule membrane; extracellular exosome; extrinsic component of membrane; extracellular region; extracellular space; azurophil granule lumen
Biological process	positive regulation of MHC class II biosynthetic process; positive regulation of phagocytosis; negative regulation of apoptotic process; protein kinase C signaling; microglial cell activation; proteolysis; induction of positive chemotaxis; monocyte activation; chemotaxis; regulation of vascular permeability; positive regulation of gene expression; macrophage chemotaxis; protein kinase C-activating G protein-coupled receptor signaling pathway; defense response to bacterium; positive regulation of peptidyl-threonine phosphorylation; neutrophil-mediated killing of bacterium; defense response to Gram-negative bacterium; cell chemotaxis; cellular extravasation; inflammatory response; calcium-mediated signaling using intracellular calcium source; glial cell migration; positive regulation of cell adhesion; positive regulation of protein kinase activity; neutrophil degranulation
Sources:Amigo / QuickGO
Orthologs
Databases	NCBI: entry; OMA: entry
Species	Human	Mouse
Entrez	566	n/a
Ensembl	ENSG00000278624; ENSG00000172232	n/a
UniProt	P20160	n/a
RefSeq (mRNA)	NM_001700	n/a
RefSeq (protein)	NP_001691	n/a
Location (UCSC)	Chr 19: 0.83 – 0.83 Mb	n/a
PubMed search		n/a
- Wikidata
View/Edit Human

Azurocidin also known as cationic antimicrobial protein CAP37 or heparin-binding protein (HBP) is a protein that in humans is encoded by the AZU1 gene.

== Function ==
Azurophil granules, specialized lysosomes of the neutrophil, contain at least 10 proteins implicated in the killing of microorganisms. The protein encoded by this gene is an azurophil granule antimicrobial protein, with monocyte chemotactic and antibacterial activity. It is also an important multifunctional inflammatory mediator. The genes encoding this protein, neutrophil elastase 2, and proteinase 3 are in a cluster located at chromosome 19pter. All 3 genes are expressed coordinately and their protein products are packaged together into azurophil granules during neutrophil differentiation.

== Structure ==
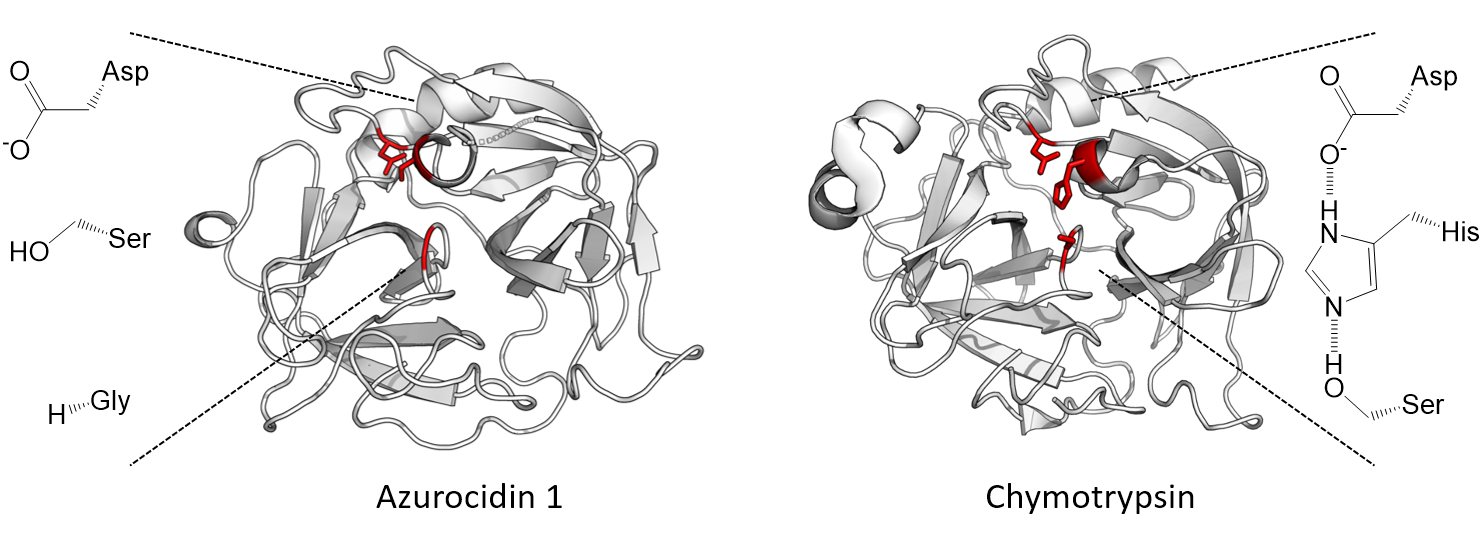
Comparison of Azurocidin 1 structure (pseudoprotease) to Chymotrypsin (functional protease) of same superfamily

This encoded protein is a member of the PA clan of proteases but it is not a serine proteinase, because the active site serine and histidine residues are replaced, making it a pseudoenzyme.

== Clinical significance ==
In patients with fever, high plasma levels of HBP indicates that the patient is at high risk of developing sepsis with circulatory collapse.
