= Amidase =

amidase

Identifiers
- EC no.: 3.5.1.4
- CAS no.: 9012-56-0

Databases
- BRENDA: enzyme data
- ExPASy: NiceZyme view
- KEGG: enzyme entry
- MetaCyc: metabolic pathway
- Rhea: reactions
- PDB structures: RCSB PDB PDBe PDBsum
- Gene Ontology: AmiGO / QuickGO
Search
- PMC: articles
- PubMed: articles
- NCBI: proteins

Amidase
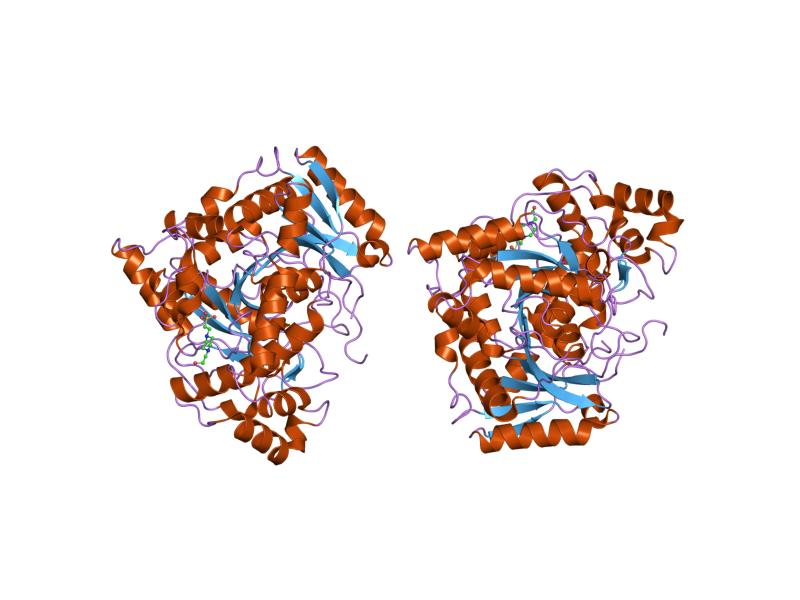
- X-ray structure of native peptide amidase from Stenotrophomonas maltophilia at 1.4 Å

Identifiers
- Symbol: Amidase
- Pfam: PF01425
- InterPro: IPR000120
- PROSITE: PDOC00494
- SCOP2: 1ocm / SCOPe / SUPFAM
- OPM superfamily: 55
- OPM protein: 1mt5
- Membranome: 325
Available protein structures:
- PDB: IPR000120 PF01425 (ECOD; PDBsum)
- AlphaFold: IPR000120; PF01425

In enzymology, an amidase (EC 3.5.1.4, acylamidase, acylase (misleading), amidohydrolase (ambiguous), deaminase (ambiguous), fatty acylamidase, N-acetylaminohydrolase (ambiguous)) is an enzyme that catalyzes the hydrolysis of an amide. In this way, the two substrates of this enzyme are an amide and H_{2}O, whereas its two products are a carboxylate and, depending on the substitution of the amide's nitrogen, either NH_{3}, a primary amine (NH_{2}R), or a secondary amine (NHRR′).

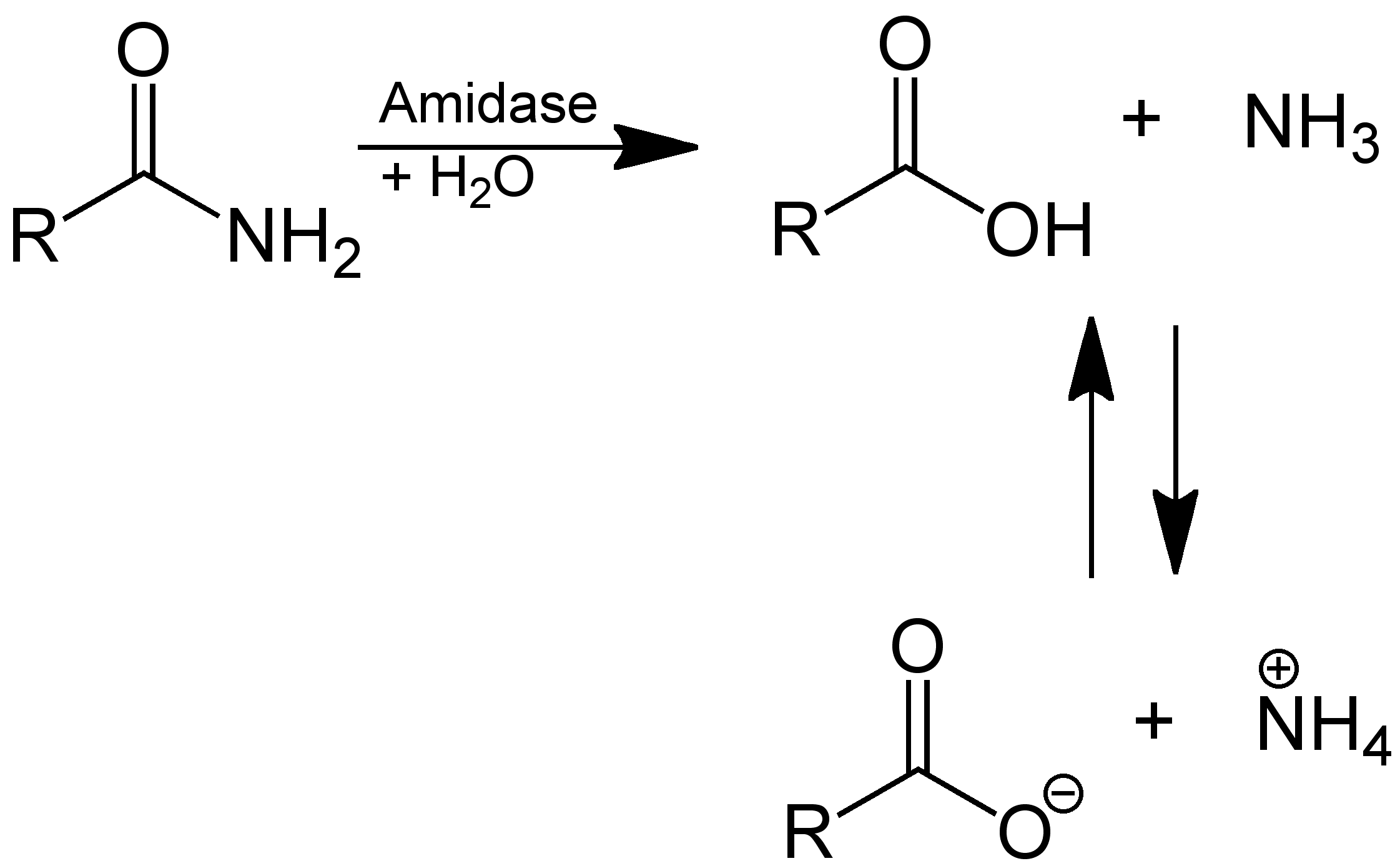

This enzyme belongs to the family of hydrolases. The systematic name of this enzyme class is acylamide amidohydrolase. Other names in common use include acylamidase, acylase, amidohydrolase, deaminase, fatty acylamidase, and N-acetylaminohydrolase. This enzyme participates in 6 metabolic pathways: urea cycle and metabolism of amino groups, phenylalanine metabolism, tryptophan metabolism, cyanoamino acid metabolism, benzoate degradation via coa ligation, and styrene degradation.

Amidases contain a conserved stretch of approximately 130 amino acids known as the AS sequence. They are widespread, being found in both prokaryotes and eukaryotes. AS enzymes catalyse the hydrolysis of amide bonds (CO-NH_{2}), although the family has diverged widely with regard to substrate specificity and function. Nonetheless, these enzymes maintain a core alpha/beta/alpha structure, where the topologies of the N- and C-terminal halves are similar. AS enzymes characteristically have a highly conserved C-terminal region rich in serine and glycine residues, but devoid of aspartic acid and histidine residues, therefore they differ from classical serine hydrolases. These enzymes possess a unique, highly conserved Ser-Ser-Lys catalytic triad used for amide hydrolysis, although the catalytic mechanism for acyl-enzyme intermediate formation can differ between enzymes.

Examples of AS signature-containing enzymes include:

- Peptide amidase (Pam), which catalyses the hydrolysis of the C-terminal amide bond of peptides.
- Fatty acid amide hydrolases, which hydrolyse fatty acid amid substrates (e.g. cannabinoid anandamide and sleep-inducing oleamide), thereby controlling the level and duration of signalling induced by this diverse class of lipid transmitters.
- Malonamidase E2, which catalyses the hydrolysis of malonamate into malonate and ammonia, and which is involved in the transport of fixed nitrogen from bacteroids to plant cells in symbiotic nitrogen metabolism.
- Subunit A of Glu-tRNA(Gln) amidotransferase, a heterotrimeric enzyme that catalyses the formation of Gln-tRNA(Gln) by the transamidation of misacylated Glu-tRNA(Gln) via amidolysis of glutamine.

== Structural studies ==
As of late 2018, 162 structures have been solved for this family, which can be accessed at the Pfam.
