= RHBDF1 =

Protein-coding gene in the species Homo sapiens

Identifiers
- Aliases: RHBDF1, C16orf8, Dist1, EGFR-RS, gene-89, gene-90, hDist1, rhomboid 5 homolog 1
- External IDs: OMIM: 614403; MGI: 104328; GeneCards: RHBDF1

Gene location (Human)
Chr.	Chromosome 16 (human)
Band	16p13.3	Start	58,059 bp
Band	16p13.3	End	76,355 bp

Gene location (Mouse)
Chr.	Chromosome 11 (mouse)
Band	11 A4|11 18.83 cM	Start	32,159,585 bp
Band	11 A4|11 18.83 cM	End	32,172,300 bp
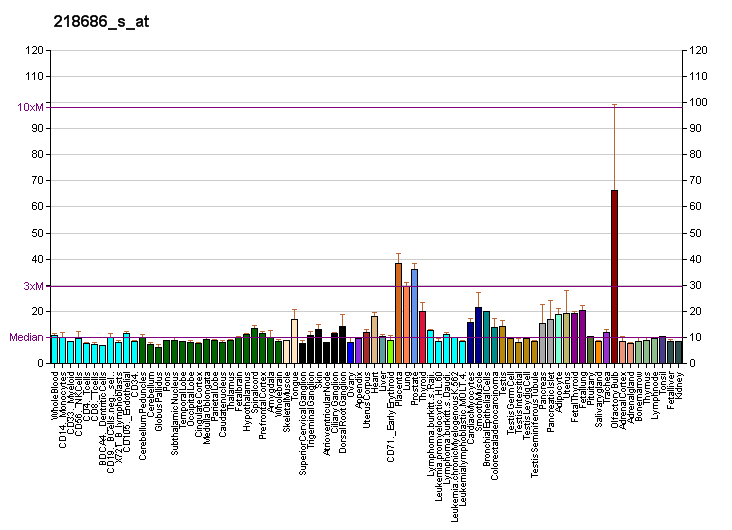
RNA expression pattern
Bgee	Human / Mouse (ortholog); Top expressed in: tibial nerve; tibial arteries; ascending aorta; right coronary artery; left coronary artery; Descending thoracic aorta; canal of the cervix; right lung; gastric mucosa; sural nerve / Top expressed in: interventricular septum; external carotid artery; internal carotid artery; primary oocyte; ankle; lip; esophagus; medullary collecting duct; carotid body; skin of external ear; More reference expression data
BioGPS	More reference expression data
Gene ontology
Molecular function	serine-type endopeptidase activity; growth factor binding; protein binding
Cellular component	integral component of membrane; Golgi membrane; Golgi apparatus; endoplasmic reticulum membrane; endoplasmic reticulum; membrane
Biological process	protein transport; regulation of proteasomal protein catabolic process; protein processing; regulation of epidermal growth factor receptor signaling pathway; cell population proliferation; cell migration; negative regulation of protein secretion; proteolysis; regulation of protein secretion
Sources:Amigo / QuickGO
Orthologs
Databases	NCBI: entry; OMA: entry
Species	Human	Mouse
Entrez	64285	13650
Ensembl	ENSG00000007384	ENSMUSG00000020282
UniProt	Q96CC6	Q6PIX5
RefSeq (mRNA)	NM_022450	NM_001291818; NM_010117
RefSeq (protein)	NP_071895	NP_001278747; NP_034247
Location (UCSC)	Chr 16: 0.06 – 0.08 Mb	Chr 11: 32.16 – 32.17 Mb
PubMed search
- Wikidata
View/Edit Human	View/Edit Mouse

Inactive rhomboid protein 1 (iRhom1) also known as rhomboid 5 homolog 1 or rhomboid family member 1 (RHBDF1) is a protein that in humans is encoded by the RHBDF1 gene. The alternative name iRhom1 has been proposed, in order to clarify that it is a catalytically inactive member of the rhomboid family of intramembrane serine proteases.
