= Beta-peptidyl aminopeptidase =

Class of enzymes

Identifiers
- EC no.: 3.4.11.25

Databases
- IntEnz: IntEnz view
- BRENDA: BRENDA entry
- ExPASy: NiceZyme view
- KEGG: KEGG entry
- MetaCyc: metabolic pathway
- PRIAM: profile
- PDB structures: RCSB PDB PDBe PDBsum
Search
- PMC: articles
- PubMed: articles
- NCBI: proteins

Beta-peptidyl aminopeptidase (EC 3.4.11.25, BapA) is an enzyme. This enzyme catalyses the following chemical reaction:

Cleaves N-terminal beta-homoamino acids from peptides composed of 2 to 6 amino acids

Sphingosinicella xenopeptidilytica strain 3-2W4 could use beta-peptides beta-homoVal-beta-homoAla-beta-homoLeu and beta-homoAla-beta-homoLeu as only source of carbon and energy.
