= Phosphatome =

Set of phosphatase-encoding genes in an organism's genome

The phosphatome of an organism is the set of phosphatase genes in its genome. Phosphatases are enzymes that catalyze the removal of phosphate from biomolecules. Over half of all cellular proteins are modified by phosphorylation which typically controls their functions. Protein phosphorylation is controlled by the opposing actions of protein phosphatases and protein kinases. Most phosphorylation sites are not linked to a specific phosphatase, so the phosphatome approach allows a global analysis of dephosphorylation, screening to find the phosphatase responsible for a given reaction, and comparative studies between different phosphatases, similar to how protein kinase research has been impacted by the kinome approach.

== Protein Phosphatome ==
Protein phosphatases remove phosphates from proteins, usually on Serine, Threonine, and Tyrosine residues, reversing the action of protein kinases. The PTP family of protein phosphatases is tyrosine-specific, and several other families (PPPL, PPM, HAD) appear to be serine/threonine specific, while other families are unknown or have a variety of substrates (DSPs dephosphorylate any amino acid, while some protein phosphatases also have non-protein substrates). In the human genome, 20 different folds of protein are known to be phosphatases, of which 10 include protein phosphatases.

Protein phosphatomes have been cataloged for human and 8 other key eukaryotes, for Plasmodium and Trypanosomes and phosphatomes have been used for functional analysis, by experimentally investing all known protein phosphatases, in the yeast Fusarium, in Plasmodium and in human cancer

Large scale databases exist for human and animal phosphatomes Phosphatome.net, parasitic protozoans ProtozPhosDB and for the substrates of human phosphatases DEPOD.

== Non-Protein Phosphatases ==
Non-protein phosphorylation has three general forms

- As a regulatory mechanism to control the function of the substrate, similar to the role of protein phosphorylation. Phosphoinositide lipids are important signaling molecules that have a variety of dedicated kinases and phosphatases.
- As an energetic intermediate. The phosphate bond is high-energy, so adding a phosphate increases the energy of a molecule, and removal of the phosphate can provide energy for an otherwise unfavorable reaction. For instance Glucose 6-phosphatase removes a phosphate group from glucose to complete gluconeogenesis.
- In biosynthesis, where the phosphate is a functional part of the mature molecule, and dephosphorylation degrades it or changes function. Nucleotidases are phosphatases used in nucleotide biosynthesis and breakdown.

The human non-protein phosphatome has been cataloged, but most phosphatome analyses are restricted to protein and lipid phosphatases that have regulatory functions.

== Pseudophosphatases ==
The phosphatome includes proteins that are structurally closely related to phosphatases but lack catalytic activity. These retain biological function, and may regulate pathways that involve active phosphatases, or bind to phosphorylated substrates without cleaving them. Examples include STYX, where the phosphatase domain has become a phospho-tyrosine binding domain, and GAK, whose inactive phosphatase domain instead binds phospholipids.

== See also ==
- Kinase
- Kinome
- Phosphatase
- Protein phosphatase
