= Oxyanion hole =

Pocket in the active site of an enzyme

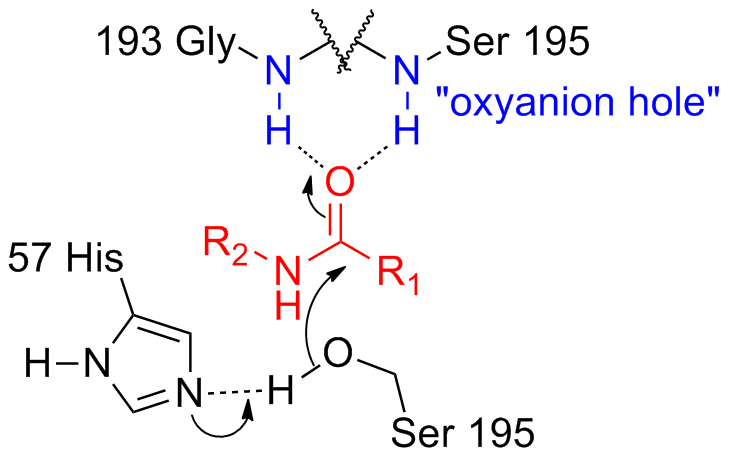
Oxyanion hole of a serine protease (black) stabilises negative charge build-up on the transition state of the substrate (red) using hydrogen bonds from enzyme's backbone amides (blue).

An oxyanion hole is a pocket in the active site of an enzyme that stabilizes transition state negative charge on a deprotonated oxygen or alkoxide. The pocket typically consists of backbone amides or positively charged residues. Stabilising the transition state lowers the activation energy necessary for the reaction, and so promotes catalysis. For example, proteases such as chymotrypsin contain an oxyanion hole to stabilise the tetrahedral intermediate anion formed during proteolysis and protects substrate's negatively charged oxygen from water molecules. Additionally, it may allow for insertion or positioning of a substrate, which would suffer from steric hindrance if it could not occupy the hole (such as BPG in hemoglobin). Enzymes that catalyse multi-step reactions can have multiple oxyanion holes that stabilise different transition states in the reaction.

== See also ==
- Enzyme catalysis
- Active site
- Transition state
- Serine proteases#Catalytic mechanism
