= VASH1 =

Protein-coding gene in the species Homo sapiens

Identifiers
- Aliases: VASH1, KIAA1036, vasohibin 1, TTCP 1
- External IDs: OMIM: 609011; MGI: 2442543; HomoloGene: 8941; GeneCards: VASH1; OMA:VASH1 - orthologs

Gene location (Human)
Chr.	Chromosome 14 (human)
Band	14q24.3	Start	76,761,468 bp
Band	14q24.3	End	76,783,015 bp

Gene location (Mouse)
Chr.	Chromosome 12 (mouse)
Band	12|12 D2	Start	86,725,474 bp
Band	12|12 D2	End	86,738,865 bp
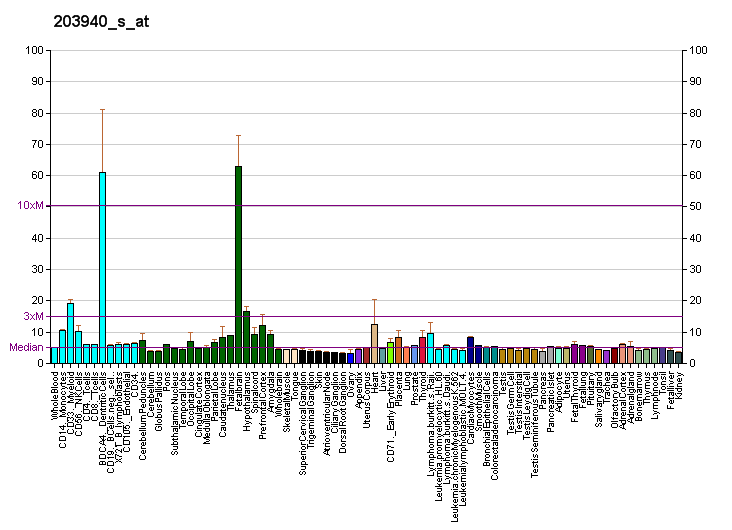
RNA expression pattern
Bgee	Human / Mouse (ortholog); Top expressed in: ganglionic eminence; C1 segment; right auricle of heart; apex of heart; right coronary artery; right adrenal gland; amygdala; sural nerve; left adrenal cortex; right hemisphere of cerebellum / Top expressed in: ganglionic eminence; olfactory bulb; mesencephalon; neural tube; rhombencephalon; ventricular zone; cerebellum; lens; cerebellar cortex; hippocampus proper; More reference expression data
BioGPS	More reference expression data
Gene ontology
Molecular function	protein binding; actin binding; metallocarboxypeptidase activity; carboxypeptidase activity; peptidase activity; hydrolase activity
Cellular component	cytoplasm; extracellular region; apical part of cell; endoplasmic reticulum; extracellular space
Biological process	negative regulation of angiogenesis; regulation of cellular senescence; cell cycle; negative regulation of lymphangiogenesis; response to wounding; regulation of angiogenesis; negative regulation of blood vessel endothelial cell migration; angiogenesis; negative regulation of endothelial cell migration; negative regulation of endothelial cell proliferation; placenta blood vessel development; labyrinthine layer blood vessel development; proteolysis
Sources:Amigo / QuickGO
Orthologs
Species	Human	Mouse
Entrez	22846	238328
Ensembl	ENSG00000071246	ENSMUSG00000021256
UniProt	Q7L8A9	Q8C1W1
RefSeq (mRNA)	NM_014909	NM_177354
RefSeq (protein)	NP_055724	NP_796328
Location (UCSC)	Chr 14: 76.76 – 76.78 Mb	Chr 12: 86.73 – 86.74 Mb
PubMed search
- Wikidata
View/Edit Human	View/Edit Mouse

Vasohibin-1 is a protein that in humans is encoded by the VASH1 gene.
