= Togavirin =

Enzyme

Identifiers
- EC no.: 3.4.21.90
- CAS no.: 342882-56-8

Databases
- BRENDA: enzyme data
- ExPASy: NiceZyme view
- KEGG: enzyme entry
- MetaCyc: metabolic pathway
- Rhea: reactions
- PDB structures: RCSB PDB PDBe PDBsum
Search
- PMC: articles
- PubMed: articles
- NCBI: proteins

Togavirin (EC 3.4.21.90, Sindbis virus protease, Sindbis virus core protein, NsP2 proteinase) is an enzyme. This enzyme catalyses the following chemical reaction

Autocatalytic release of the core protein from the N-terminus of the togavirus structural polyprotein by hydrolysis of a -Trp-Ser- bond

This enzyme is isolated from the Sindbis and Semliki forest togaviruses.
