= Gamma-glutamyl hydrolase =

Protein-coding gene in the species Homo sapiens

Identifiers
- EC no.: 3.4.19.9
- CAS no.: 9074-87-7

Databases
- BRENDA: enzyme data
- ExPASy: NiceZyme view
- KEGG: enzyme entry
- MetaCyc: metabolic pathway
- Rhea: reactions
- PDB structures: RCSB PDB PDBe PDBsum
Search
- PMC: articles
- PubMed: articles
- NCBI: proteins

GGH
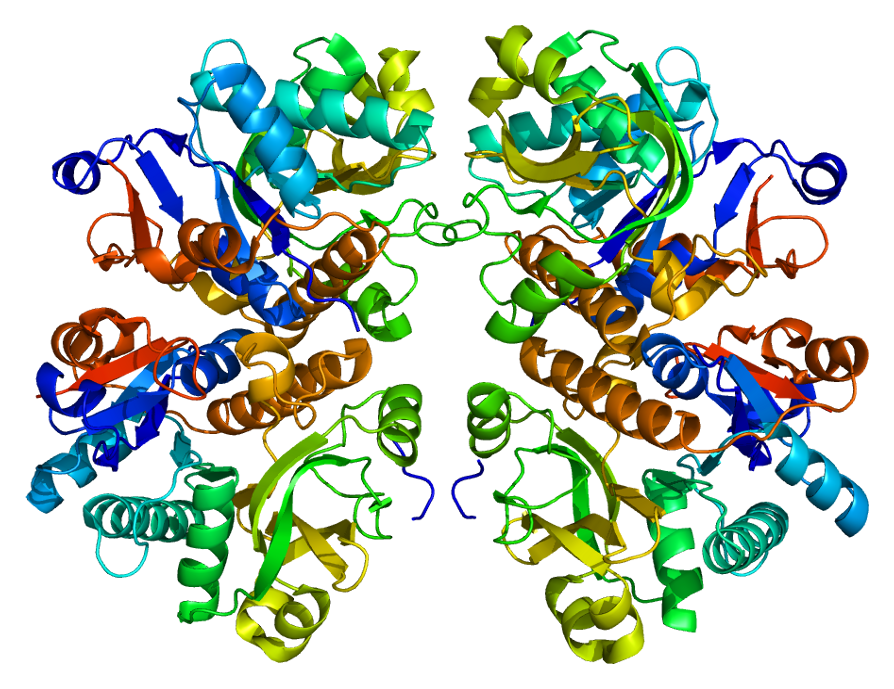

Identifiers
- Aliases: GGH, GH, gamma-glutamyl hydrolase, GATD10
- External IDs: OMIM: 601509; MGI: 1329035; GeneCards: GGH
Available structures
PDB	Ortholog search: PDBe RCSB
PDB	List of PDB id codes 1L9X
Enzyme activity
EC #	BRENDA	ExPASy	KEGG	MetaCyc
3.4.19.9	↗	↗	↗	↗

Gene location (Human)
Chr.	Chromosome 8 (human)
Band	8q12.3	Start	63,014,881 bp
Band	8q12.3	End	63,039,407 bp

Gene location (Mouse)
Chr.	Chromosome 4 (mouse)
Band	4|4 A3	Start	20,042,052 bp
Band	4|4 A3	End	20,066,750 bp
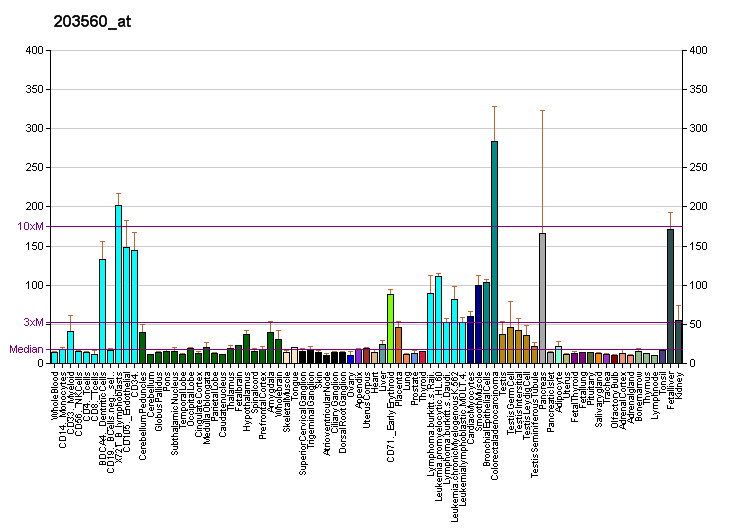
RNA expression pattern
Bgee	Human / Mouse (ortholog); Top expressed in: rectum; kidney tubule; ventricular zone; mucosa of sigmoid colon; mucosa of transverse colon; right lobe of liver; human penis; ganglionic eminence; gonad; glomerulus / Top expressed in: parotid gland; lacrimal gland; left colon; submandibular gland; esophagus; Epithelium of choroid plexus; pyloric antrum; skin of external ear; pancreas; skin of abdomen; More reference expression data
BioGPS	More reference expression data
Gene ontology
Molecular function	exopeptidase activity; omega peptidase activity; hydrolase activity; gamma-glutamyl-peptidase activity
Cellular component	melanosome; cytosol; lysosome; extracellular exosome; nucleus; extracellular region; extracellular space; azurophil granule lumen; specific granule lumen; tertiary granule lumen; vacuole
Biological process	response to insulin; response to zinc ion; response to ethanol; proteolysis; neutrophil degranulation; tetrahydrofolylpolyglutamate metabolic process
Sources:Amigo / QuickGO
Orthologs
Databases	NCBI: entry; OMA: entry
Species	Human	Mouse
Entrez	8836	14590
Ensembl	ENSG00000137563	ENSMUSG00000073987
UniProt	Q92820	Q9Z0L8
RefSeq (mRNA)	NM_003878	NM_010281
RefSeq (protein)	NP_003869	NP_034411
Location (UCSC)	Chr 8: 63.01 – 63.04 Mb	Chr 4: 20.04 – 20.07 Mb
PubMed search
- Wikidata
View/Edit Human	View/Edit Mouse

Gamma-glutamyl hydrolase is an enzyme that catalyses the following chemical reaction:

Hydrolysis of a gamma-glutamyl bond

This lysosomal or secreted, thiol-dependent peptidase, most active at acidic pH.

In humans, gamma-glutamyl hydrolase is encoded by the GGH gene. This gene catalyzes the hydrolysis of folylpoly-gamma-glutamates and antifolylpoly-gamma-glutamates by the removal of gamma-linked polyglutamates and glutamate.

== Nomenclature ==
Gamma-glutamyl hydrolase is also known as conjugase, folate conjugase, lysosomal gamma-glutamyl carboxypeptidase, gamma-Glu-X carboxypeptidase, pteroyl-poly-gamma-glutamate hydrolase, carboxypeptidase G, folic acid conjugase, poly(gamma-glutamic acid) endohydrolase, polyglutamate hydrolase, poly(glutamic acid) hydrolase II, pteroylpoly-gamma-glutamyl hydrolase.

== Interactive pathway map ==
Click on genes, proteins and metabolites below to link to respective articles. (Note: The interactive pathway map can be edited at WikiPathways: "FluoropyrimidineActivity_WP1601".)

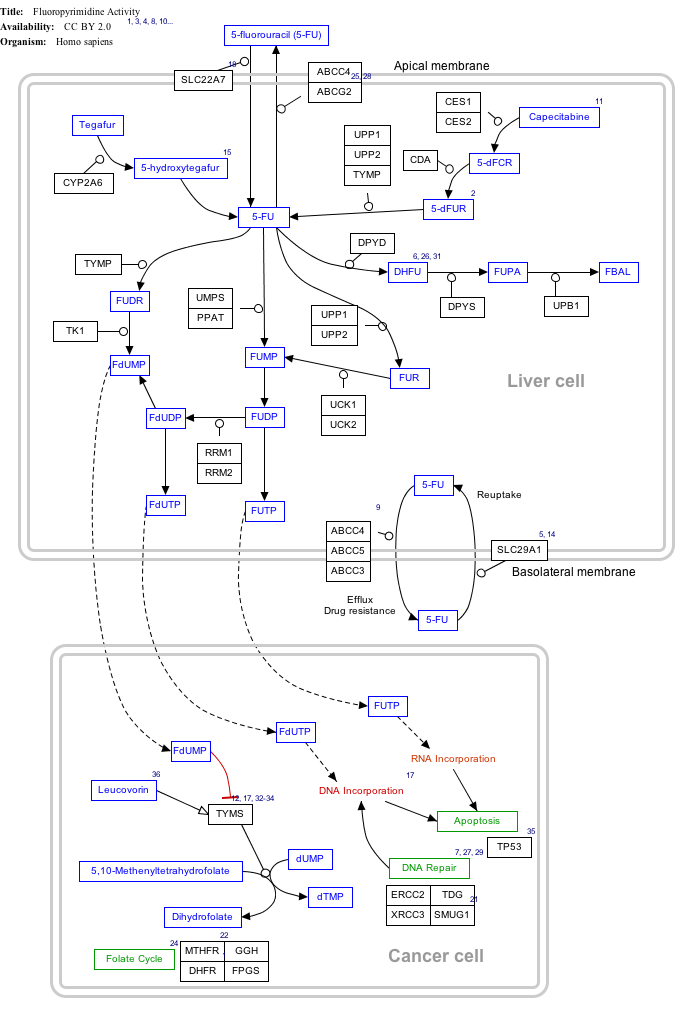

Fluorouracil (5-FU) Activity edit
