= Glutamate N-acetyltransferase =

Enzyme

Identifiers
- EC no.: 2.3.1.35
- CAS no.: 37257-14-0

Databases
- IntEnz: IntEnz view
- BRENDA: BRENDA entry
- ExPASy: NiceZyme view
- KEGG: KEGG entry
- MetaCyc: metabolic pathway
- PRIAM: profile
- PDB structures: RCSB PDB PDBe PDBsum
- Gene Ontology: AmiGO / QuickGO
Search
- PMC: articles
- PubMed: articles
- NCBI: proteins

Glutamate N-acetyltransferase (EC 2.3.1.35) is an enzyme characterised from Chlamydomonas reinhardti that is involved in the biosynthesis of arginine by catalyzing the chemical reaction

N-Acetylornithine
+
Glutamic acid
Ornithine
+
N-Acetylglutamic acid

The two substrates of this enzyme are N-acetylornithine and glutamic acid. The acetyl group is transferred and the products are ornithine and N-acetylglutamic acid.

This enzyme belongs to the family of transferases, specifically those acyltransferases transferring groups other than aminoacyl groups. The systematic name of this enzyme class is N2-acetyl-L-ornithine:L-glutamate N-acetyltransferase.

== Structural studies ==
As of late 2007, 4 structures have been solved for this class of enzymes, with PDB accession codes 1VRA, 1VZ6, 1VZ7, and 1VZ8.
