= Pseudoenzyme =

Catalytically deficient enzymes

Pseudoenzymes are variants of enzymes that are catalytically-deficient (usually inactive), meaning that they perform little or no enzyme catalysis. They are believed to be represented in all major enzyme families in the kingdoms of life, where they have important signaling and metabolic functions, many of which are only now coming to light. Pseudoenzymes are becoming increasingly important to analyse, especially as the bioinformatic analysis of genomes reveals their ubiquity. Their important regulatory and sometimes disease-associated functions in metabolic and signalling pathways are also shedding new light on the non-catalytic functions of active enzymes, of moonlighting proteins, the re-purposing of proteins in distinct cellular roles (Protein moonlighting). They are also suggesting new ways to target and interpret cellular signalling mechanisms using small molecules and drugs. The most intensively analyzed, and certainly the best understood pseudoenzymes in terms of cellular signalling functions are probably the pseudokinases, the pseudoproteases and the pseudophosphatases. Recently, the pseudo-deubiquitylases have also begun to gain prominence.

== Structures and roles ==
The difference between enzymatically active and inactive homologues has been noted (and in some cases, understood when comparing catalytically active and inactive proteins residing in recognisable families) for some time at the sequence level, owing to the absence of key catalytic residues. Some pseudoenzymes have also been referred to as 'prozymes' when they were analysed in protozoan parasites. The best studied pseudoenzymes reside amongst various key signalling superfamilies of enzymes, such as the proteases, the protein kinases, protein phosphatases and ubiquitin modifying enzymes. The role of pseudoenzymes as "pseudo scaffolds" has also been recognised and pseudoenzymes are now beginning to be more thoroughly studied in terms of their biology and function, in large part because they are also interesting potential targets (or anti-targets) for drug design in the context of intracellular cellular signalling complexes.

== Examples classes ==
Class	Function	Examples
Pseudokinase	Allosteric regulation of conventional protein kinase	STRADα regulates activity of the conventional protein kinase, LKB1 JAK1-3 and TYK2 C-terminal tyrosine kinase domains are regulated by their adjacent pseudokinase domain KSR1/2 regulates activation of the conventional protein kinase, Raf
Pseudokinase	Allosteric regulation of other enzymes	VRK3 regulates activity of the phosphatase, VHR
Pseudo-Histidine kinase	Protein interaction domain	Caulobacter DivL binds the phosphorylated response regulator, DivK, allowing DivL to negatively regulate the asymmetric cell division regulatory kinase, CckA
Pseudophosphatase	Occlusion of conventional phosphatase access to substrate	EGG-4/EGG-5 binds to the phosphorylated activation loop of the kinase, MBK-2 STYX competes with DUSP4 for binding to ERK1/2
Pseudophosphatase	Allosteric regulation of conventional phosphatases	MTMR13 binds and promotes lipid phosphatase activity of MTMR2
Pseudophosphatase	Regulation of protein localisation in a cell	STYX acts as a nuclear anchor for ERK1/2
Pseudophosphatase	Regulation of signalling complex assembly	STYX binds the F-box protein, FBXW7, to inhibit its recruitment to the SCF Ubiquitin ligase complex
Pseudoprotease	Allosteric regulator of conventional protease	cFLIP binds and inhibits the cysteine protease, Caspase-8, to block extrinsic apoptosis
Pseudoprotease	Regulation of protein localisation in a cell	Mammalian iRhom proteins bind and regulate trafficking single pass transmembrane proteins to plasma membrane or ER-associated degradation pathway
Pseudodeubiquitinase (pseudoDUB)	Allosteric regulator of conventional DUB	KIAA0157 is crucial to assembly of a higher order heterotetramer with DUB, BRCC36, and DUB activity
Pseudoligase (pseudo-Ubiquitin E2)	Allosteric regulator of conventional E2 ligase	Mms2 is a ubiquitin E2 variant (UEV) that binds active E2, Ubc13, to direct K63 ubiquitin linkages
Pseudoligase (pseudo-Ubiquitin E2)	Regulation of protein localisation in a cell	Tsg101 is a component of the ESCRT-I trafficking complex, and plays a key role in HIV-1 Gag binding and HIV budding
Pseudoligase (pseudo-Ubiquitin E3)	Possible allosteric regulator of conventional RBR family E3 ligase	BRcat regulates interdomain architecture in RBR family E3 Ubiquitin ligases, such as Parkin and Ariadne-1/2
Pseudonuclease	Allosteric regulator of conventional nuclease	CPSF-100 is a component of the pre-mRNA 3´ end processing complex containing the active counterpart, CPSF-73
PseudoATPase	Allosteric regulator of conventional ATPase	EccC comprises two pseudoATPase domains that regulate the N-terminal conventional ATPase domain
PseudoGTPase	Allosteric regulator of conventional GTPase	GTP-bound Rnd1 or Rnd3/RhoE bind p190RhoGAP to regulate the catalytic activity of the conventional GTPase, RhoA
PseudoGTPase	Scaffold for assembly of signalling complexes	MiD51, which is catalytically dead but binds GDP or ADP, is part of a complex that recruits Drp1 to mediate mitochondrial fission. CENP-M cannot bind GTP or switch conformations, but is essential for nucleating the CENP-I, CENP-H, CENP-K small GTPase complex to regulate kinetochore assembly
PseudoGTPase	Regulation of protein localisation in a cell	Yeast light intermediate domain (LIC) is a pseudoGTPase, devoid of nucleotide binding, which binds the dynein motor to cargo. Human LIC binds GDP in preference to GTP, suggesting nucleotide binding could confer stability rather than underlying a switch mechanism.
Pseudochitinase	Substrate recruitment or sequestration	YKL-39 binds, but does not process, chitooligosaccharides via 5 binding subsites
Pseudosialidase	Scaffold for assembly of signalling complexes	CyRPA nucleates assembly of the P. falciparum PfRh5/PfRipr complex that binds the erythrocyte receptor, basigin, and mediates host cell invasion
Pseudolyase	Allosteric activation of conventional enzyme counterpart	Prozyme heterodimerisation with S-adenosylmethionine decarboxylase (AdoMetDC) activates catalytic activity 1000-fold
Pseudotransferase	Allosteric activation of cellular enzyme counterpart	Viral GAT recruits cellular PFAS to deaminate RIG-I and counter host antiviral defence. T. brucei deoxyhypusine synthase (TbDHS) dead paralog, DHSp, binds to and activates DHSc >1000-fold.
Pseudo-histone acetyl transferase (pseudoHAT)	Possible scaffold for assembly of signalling complexes	Human O-GlcNAcase (OGA) lacks catalytic residues and acetyl CoA binding, unlike bacterial counterpart
Pseudo-phospholipase	Possible scaffold for assembly of signalling complexes	FAM83 family proteins presumed to have acquired new functions in preference to ancestral phospholipase D catalytic activity
Pseudo-phospholipase	Allosteric inactivation of conventional enzyme counterpart	Viper phospholipase A2 inhibitor structurally resembles the human cellular protein it targets, phospholipase A2.
Pseudo-oxidoreductase	Allosteric inactivation of conventional enzyme counterpart	ALDH2*2 thwarts assembly of the active counterpart, ALDH2*1, into a tetramer.
Pseudo-dismutase	Allosteric activation of conventional enzyme counterpart	Copper chaperone for superoxide dismutase (CCS) binds and activates catalysis by its enzyme counterpart, SOD1
Pseudo-dihydroorotase	Regulating folding or complex assembly of conventional enzyme	Pseudomonas pDHO is required for either folding of the aspartate transcarbamoylase catalytic subunit, or its assembly into an active oligomer
Pseudo-RNase	Facilitating complex assembly/stability and promoting association of catalytic paralog	KREPB4 may act as a pseudoenzyme to form the noncatalytic half of an RNase III heterodimer with the editing endonuclease(s)

== See also ==
- Kinase
- Pseudokinase
- Phosphatome
- Protein phosphatase
