= Proteinase K =

Broad-spectrum serine protease

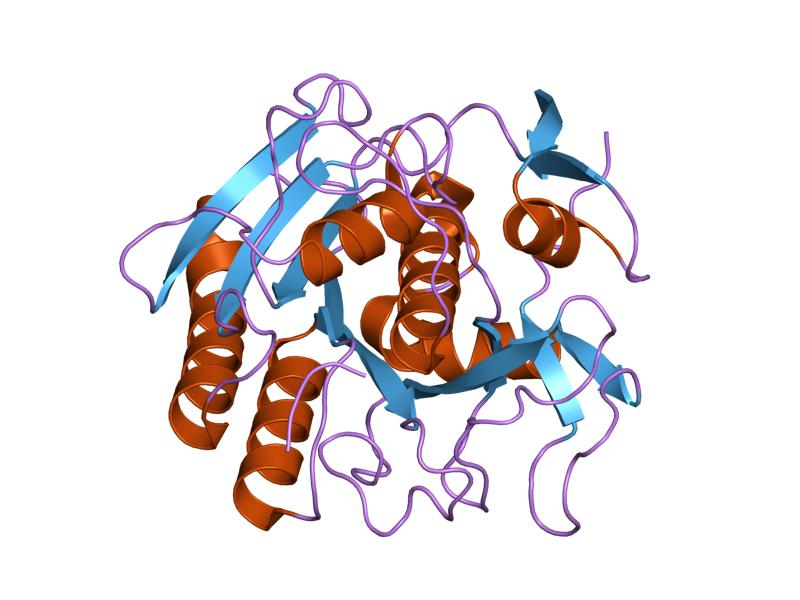
- Structure of Proteinase K.

Identifiers
- EC no.: 3.4.21.64
- CAS no.: 39450-01-6

Databases
- BRENDA: enzyme data
- ExPASy: NiceZyme view
- KEGG: enzyme entry
- MetaCyc: metabolic pathway
- Rhea: reactions
- PDB structures: RCSB PDB PDBe PDBsum
Search
- PMC: articles
- PubMed: articles
- NCBI: proteins

Proteinase K

Identifiers
- Organism: Engyodontium album
- Symbol: PROK
- Orthologs: OMA: entry
- UniProt: P06873
Search for
- Structures: Swiss-model
- Domains: InterPro

In molecular biology, Proteinase K (EC 3.4.21.64, protease K, endopeptidase K, Tritirachium alkaline proteinase, Tritirachium album serine proteinase, Tritirachium album proteinase K) is a broad-spectrum serine protease. The enzyme was discovered in 1974 in extracts of the fungus Parengyodontium album (formerly Engyodontium album or Tritirachium album). Proteinase K is able to digest hair (keratin), hence, the name "Proteinase K". The predominant site of cleavage is the peptide bond adjacent to the carboxyl group of aliphatic and aromatic amino acids with blocked alpha amino groups. It is commonly used for its broad specificity. This enzyme belongs to Peptidase family S8 (subtilisin). The molecular weight of Proteinase K is 28,900 daltons (28.9 kDa).

== Enzyme activity ==
Activated by calcium, the enzyme digests proteins preferentially after hydrophobic amino acids (aliphatic, aromatic and other hydrophobic amino acids). Although calcium ions do not affect the enzyme activity, they do contribute to its stability. Proteins will be completely digested if the incubation time is long and the protease concentration high enough. Upon removal of the calcium ions, the stability of the enzyme is reduced, but the proteolytic activity remains. Proteinase K has two binding sites for Ca^{2+}, which are located close to the active center, but are not directly involved in the catalytic mechanism. The residual activity is sufficient to digest proteins, which usually contaminate nucleic acid preparations. Therefore, the digestion with Proteinase K for the purification of nucleic acids is usually performed in the presence of EDTA (inhibition of metal-ion dependent enzymes such as nucleases).

Proteinase K is also stable over a wide pH range (4–12), with a pH optimum of pH 8.0. An elevation of the reaction temperature from 37 °C to 50–60 °C may increase the activity several times, like the addition of 0.5–1% sodium dodecyl sulfate (SDS) or Guanidinium chloride (3 M), Guanidinium thiocyanate (1 M) and urea (4 M). The above-mentioned conditions enhance proteinase K activity by making its substrate cleavage sites more accessible. Temperatures above 65 °C, trichloroacetic acid (TCA) or the serine protease-inhibitors AEBSF, PMSF or DFP inhibit the activity. Proteinase K will not be inhibited by Guanidinium chloride, Guanidinium thiocyanate, urea, Sarkosyl, Triton X-100, Tween 20, SDS, citrate, iodoacetic acid, EDTA or by other serine protease inhibitors like Nα-Tosyl-Lys Chloromethyl Ketone (TLCK) and Nα-Tosyl-Phe Chloromethyl Ketone (TPCK).

Protease K activity in commonly used buffers

Buffer (pH = 8.0, 50 °C, 1.25 μg/mL protease K, 15 min incubation)	Proteinase K activity (%)
30 mM Tris·Cl	100
30 mM Tris·Cl; 30 mM EDTA; 5% Tween 20; 0.5% Triton X-100; 800 mM GuHCl	313
36 mM Tris·Cl; 36 mM EDTA; 5% Tween 20; 0.36% Triton X-100; 735 mM GuHCl	301
10 mM Tris·Cl; 25 mM EDTA; 100 mM NaCl; 0.5% SDS	128
10 mM Tris·Cl; 100 mM EDTA; 20 mM NaCl; 1% Sarkosyl	74
10 mM Tris·Cl; 50 mM KCl; 1.5 mM MgCl_{2}; 0.45% Tween 20; 0.5% Triton X-100	106
10 mM Tris·Cl; 100 mM EDTA; 0.5% SDS	120
30 mM Tris·Cl; 10 mM EDTA; 1% SDS	203

== Applications ==
Proteinase K is commonly used in molecular biology to digest protein and remove contamination from preparations of nucleic acid. Addition of Proteinase K to nucleic acid preparations rapidly inactivates nucleases that might otherwise degrade the DNA or RNA during purification. It is highly suited to this application since the enzyme is active in the presence of chemicals that denature proteins, such as SDS and urea, chelating agents such as EDTA, sulfhydryl reagents, as well as trypsin or chymotrypsin inhibitors. Proteinase K is used for the destruction of proteins in cell lysates (tissue, cell culture cells) and for the release of nucleic acids, since it very effectively inactivates DNases and RNases. Some examples for applications: Proteinase K is very useful in the isolation of highly native, undamaged DNAs or RNAs, since most microbial or mammalian DNases and RNases are rapidly inactivated by the enzyme, particularly in the presence of 0.5–1% SDS.

The enzyme's activity towards native proteins is stimulated by denaturants such as SDS. In contrast, when measured using peptide substrates, denaturants inhibit the enzyme. The reason for this result is that the denaturing agents unfold the protein substrates and make them more accessible to the protease.

== Inhibitors ==
Proteinase K has two disulfide bonds, but it exhibits higher proteolytic activity in the presence of reducing agents (e.g. 5 mM DTT), suggesting that the presumed reduction of its own disulfide bonds does not lead to its irreversible inactivation. Proteinase K is inhibited by serine protease inhibitors such as phenylmethylsulfonyl fluoride (PMSF), diisopropylfluorophosphate (DFP), or 4-(2-aminoethyl)benzenesulfonyl fluoride (AEBSF). Proteinase K activity is unaffected by the sulfhydryl modifying reagents: para-chloromercuribenzoic acid (PCMB), N-alpha-tosyl-L-lysyl-chloromethyl-ketone (TLCK), or N-alpha-Tosyl-l-phenylalanine Chloromethyl Ketone (TPCK), although presumably if these reagents were included alongside disulfide reducing reagents which exposed the typically-unavailable Proteinase K thiols, it may then become inhibited.
