= Proteinase A =

Proteinase A may refer to:

- Streptogrisin A, an enzyme
- Aspergillopepsin II, an enzyme
- Saccharopepsin, an enzyme
