= Threonine protease =

Class of enzymes

Threonine Protease
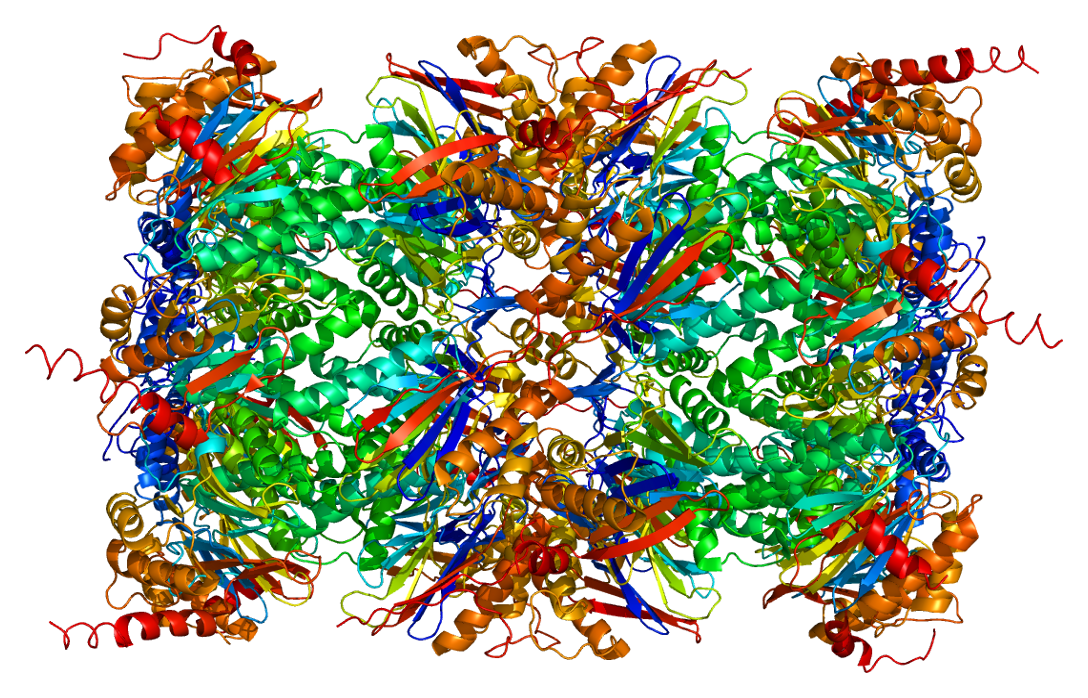
- Crystal structure of human proteasome alpha 1

Identifiers
- Symbol: Thr
Available protein structures:
- PDB: 1iru

Threonine proteases are a family of proteolytic enzymes harbouring a threonine (Thr) residue within the active site. The prototype members of this class of enzymes are the catalytic subunits of the proteasome, however, the acyltransferases convergently evolved the same active site geometry and mechanism.

== Mechanism ==
Threonine proteases use the secondary alcohol of their N-terminal threonine as a nucleophile to perform catalysis. The threonine must be N-terminal since the terminal amine of the same residue acts as a general base by polarising an ordered water which deprotonates the alcohol to increase its reactivity as a nucleophile.

Catalysis takes place in two steps:

- Firstly the nucleophile attacks the substrate to form a covalent acyl-enzyme intermediate, releasing the first product.
- Secondly the intermediate is hydrolysed by water to regenerate the free enzyme and release the second product.
  - In ornithine acyltransferase, instead of water, the substrate ornithine (the acceptor) performs the second nucleophilic attack and so leaves with the acyl group.

== Classification and evolution ==
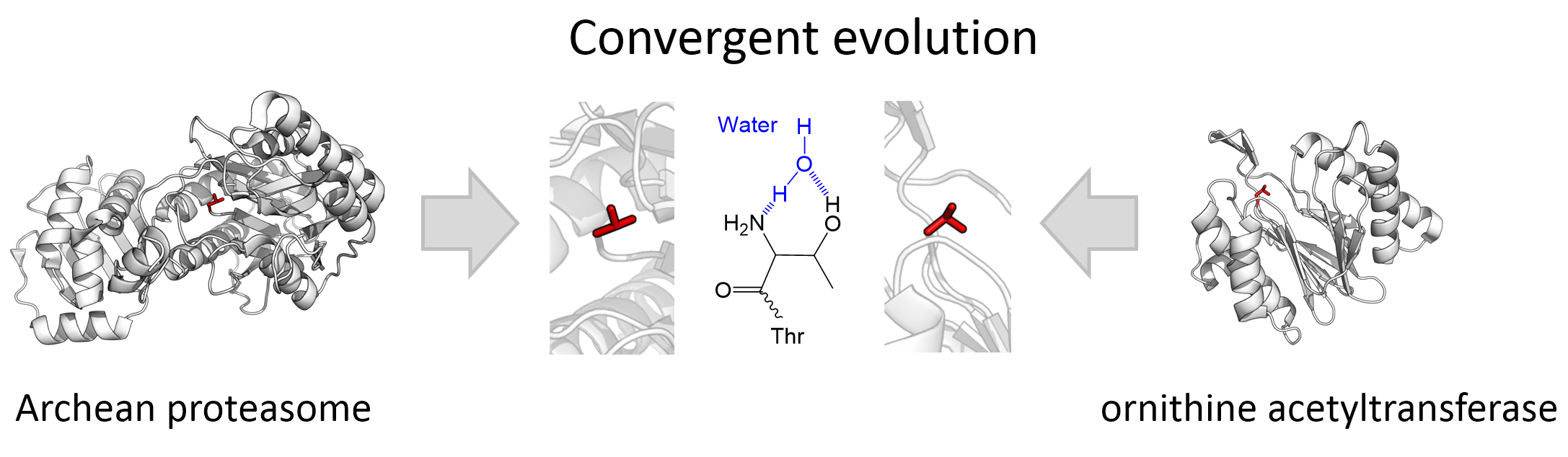
Evolutionary convergence of threonine proteases towards the same N-terminal active site organisation. Shown are the catalytic threonine of the proteasome (clan PB, family T1) and ornithine acetyltransferase (clan PE, family T5).

Five families belonging to two separate superfamilies are currently recognised: the Ntn fold proteosomes (superfamily PB) and the DOM fold ornithine acyltransferases (superfamily PE). The two superfamilies represent two independent, convergent evolutions of the same active site.

Superfamily	Threonine protease families	Examples
PB clan	T1, T2, T3, T6	archaean proteasome, beta component (Thermoplasma acidophilum)
PE clan	T5	ornithine acetyltransferase (Saccharomyces cerevisiae)

== See also ==
- Protease
  - serine-
  - cysteine-
  - aspartic-
  - metallo-
- Enzyme
- Proteolysis
- Catalytic triad
- Convergent evolution
- The Proteolysis Map
- Protease inhibitor (pharmacology)
- Protease inhibitor (biology)
- TopFIND - database of protease specificity, substrates, products and inhibitors
- MEROPS - database of protease evolutionary groups
