= Keratinase =

Proteolytic enzyme that digests keratin

Keratinases are proteolytic enzymes that digest keratin. They hold industrial promise, as they can turn keratin-rich farm waste such as feather meal into more digestible fragments.

== History ==
They were initially classified as 'proteinases of unknown mechanism' by the Nomenclature Committee on the International Union of Biochemistry in 1978 with EC number 3.4.99 in 1983 (Owen et al., 1983). In the 1990s, they were defined as serine proteases due to high sequence homology with alkaline protease, and their inhibition by serine protease inhibitors (Wang et al., 1995; Taha et al., 1998 and Bressollier et al., 1999). Some are more specifically subtilisins.

Being a functional classification, there is not necessarily a shared evolutionary origin or mechanism for all keratinases. Some newly-discovered keratinases known as of 2016 are not serine proteases, but metalloproteases.

== Function ==
Keratin is protease resistant due to its compaction, rigidity, crosslinking and hydrophobicity. Hydrophobic and electrostatic interactions attach keratinase to keratin surfaces, enabling proteolysis. The primary catalytic mechanism consists of serine protease activity combined with high specificity for compact substrates and exposed active sites. Additional disulfide bond cleavage by other means is often required for complete degradation.

Keratinases are produced only in the presence of keratin-containing substrate. Keratinase production has been reported in various microorganisms including fungi and bacteria, and occurs at near-alkaline pH and thermophilic temperatures. These enzymes have a broad substrate specificity, degrading fibrous proteins such as fibrin, elastin and collagen, and non-fibrous proteins such as casein, bovine serum albumin and gelatin. (Noval et al., 1959; Mukhapadhayay et al., 1989; Dozie et al., 1994; Lin et al., 1995; Letourneau et al., 1998; and Bressollier et al., 1999).

== Distribution ==
At first Molyneux et al. (1959) attempted to isolate some bacteria that are able to degrade keratin. He isolated organisms from the contents of experimentally induced dermoid cysts from mid lateral region of sheep. Examination of wool sample showed degraded wool with numerous corticle and cyticular cells. He found disruption of wool fiber in both in vivo and in vitro. He showed that the organisms belong to genus Bacillus and the organism was capable of attacking native wool protein. The same year Noval et al. (1959) published another article on enzymatic decomposition of native keratin by Streptomyces fradiae. They showed extracellular enzyme secreted by these bacteria capable of degrading the human hair in its native state.

Keratinolytic protein from keratinophilic fungi were reported by Yu et al. (1968), Asahi et al. (1985), and Willams et al. (1989). Mukhopadhay et al. (1989) reported keratinase production by Streptomyces sp. He isolated an inducible extracellular homogeneous enzyme, which shows a 7.5-fold increases in its activity after DEAE cellulose column chromatography. The enzyme-activity was inhibited by reduced glutathione, PMSF and 2-¬Mercaptaethanol.

Williams et al. (1990) continued his work on enriched feather degrading culture and characterized the organism to its species level for the first time. The microorganisms were identified as Bacillus licheniformis, purified and characterized keratinase from feather degrading Bacillus licheniformis strain isolated by Williams et al. (1990) with the help of membrane ultra filtration and C-75 gel chromatography. He purified enzyme with 70-fold increased activity. SDS-PAGE analysis revealed that purified keratinase had a molecular weight of 33 kDa. Dozie et al. (1994) reported a thermostable, alkaline-active, keratinolytic proteinasefrom Chrysosporium keratinophylum which was able to solubilize keratin in lactose-mineral salt medium with DMSO. Optimum pH for the enzyme activity was 9 and optimum temperature was 90 °C. Wang et al. (1999) scaled up the fermentation condition of keratinase to a pilot scale fermentar. They optimized the fermentation condition to a level of 10-fold increase in enzyme production.

== See also ==
- Subtilisin
- Proteinase K
