= AEBSF =

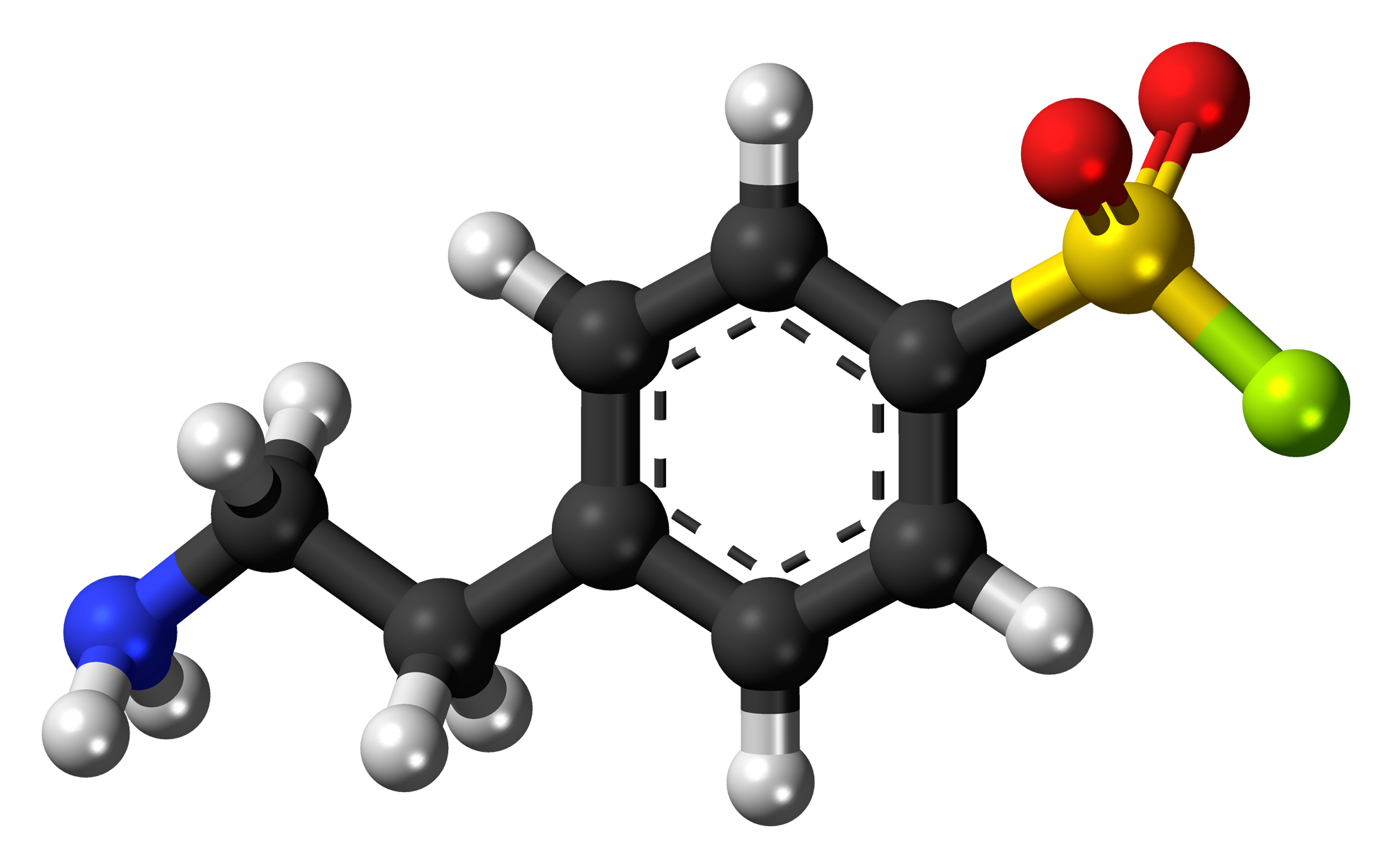

Names
- Preferred IUPAC name 4-(2-Aminoethyl)benzene-1-sulfonyl fluoride
- Other names Pefabloc SC

Identifiers
CAS Number	34284-75-8; 30827-99-7 (hydrochloride salt)
3D model (JSmol)	Interactive image
ChEMBL	ChEMBL1096339
ChemSpider	1638
DrugBank	DB07347
MeSH	AEBSF
PubChem CID	1701
UNII	F5D36L5354
CompTox Dashboard (EPA)	DTXSID40187844
- InChI: InChI=1S/C8H10FNO2S/c9-13(11,12)8-3-1-7(2-4-8)5-6-10/h1-4H,5-6,10H2 Key: MGSKVZWGBWPBTF-UHFFFAOYSA-N; InChI=1/C8H10FNO2S/c9-13(11,12)8-3-1-7(2-4-8)5-6-10/h1-4H,5-6,10H2 Key: MGSKVZWGBWPBTF-UHFFFAOYAK
- SMILES: FS(=O)(=O)c1ccc(cc1)CCN

Properties
Chemical formula	C_{8}H_{10}FNO_{2}S
Molar mass	203.23 g·mol^{−1}
Solubility in water	200 mg/mL
- Except where otherwise noted, data are given for materials in their standard state (at 25 °C [77 °F], 100 kPa). verify (what is ?) Infobox references

AEBSF or 4-(2-aminoethyl)benzenesulfonyl fluoride hydrochloride is a water-soluble, irreversible serine protease inhibitor with a molecular weight of 239.5 Da. It inhibits proteases like chymotrypsin, kallikrein, plasmin, thrombin, and trypsin. The specificity is similar to the inhibitor PMSF, nevertheless AEBSF is more stable at low pH values. Typical usage is 0.1 - 1.0 mM. AEBSF (marketed as Pefabloc SC from the company Pentapharm) was first reported for use in biochemistry in 1993, and came into common use for the inhibition serine proteases and of non-protease enzymes such as acetylhydrolases in the mid 1990s.

== Mechanism of action ==
AEBSF is targeted to covalently modify the hydroxyl of serine residues, where it causes an additional 183.0354 Da to be added to each modified residue, but other off-target residues such as tyrosine, lysine, histidine, and the protein N-terminal amino group, have also been reported. Due to the substantial frequency of modification of these off-target residues in unoptimized protocols, some users recommend not using AEBSF for highly sensitive proteomics applications, and instead recommend using fresh (and comparatively unstable) PMSF. Both AEBSF and PMSF are sulfonyl fluorides and are sulfonylating agents. Sulfonyl fluorides act by reacting with the hydroxy group of the active site serine residue to form a sulfonyl enzyme derivative. This derivative may be stable for long periods of time except at high pH.

== Use in cholesterol regulation studies ==
AEBSF is extensively used in studies aiming to describe cholesterol regulatory genes due to its potent ability to inhibit site-1 protease (S1P). This serine protease, located in the Golgi apparatus, is responsible for activating the Sterol regulatory element-binding proteins (SREBPs). By selectively inhibiting S1P, AEBSF can be used to characterize the downstream result of SREBP inhibition and its influence on cholesterol regulation.

== See also ==
- Phenylmethylsulfonyl fluoride (PMSF)
- Diisopropyl fluorophosphate (DFP), an analogous fluorophosphonate phosphorylating reagent
