= Phytaspase =

Phytaspase is a member of the plant subtilisin-like protease family, and is commonly distinguished from the other members by its unusual and extremely high specificity towards its substrates, which resembles that of the animal caspases. Similarly to the animal caspases, the phytaspase is a cell death promoting protease.

== Name ==
The name phytaspase comes from phyto- (greek. for plant) and -aspase (aspartate-directed protease), similarly to caspases.

== Substrate specificity ==
The phytaspase displays a strict substrate specificity, which resembles that of the animal caspase-3. It recognizes a tetrapetide motive within a target protein and introduces a peptide bond break following an aspartate residue, which is crucial for the hydrolysis. Theoretical speculations, based on a 3D model predictions have been made, pointing to the histidine 331 of the phytaspase peptide chain, that might interact with the Asp in the target peptide and thereby guide the recognition.

== Structure ==
The phytaspase displays a structure, common to the subtilisin-like proteases. Its N-terminus includes a prodomain, which commonly inhibits subtilisin-like proteases and undergoes an autocatalytic cleavage during maturation, followed by a protease domain, which includes and adheres the common order of the sequence of the three canonic catalytic amino acid residues, and a prolonged C-terminal domain.

== Cellular localization ==
The very N-terminus of the phytaspase molecule starts with a leader peptide, that is cleaved off during the translocation of the protein to the endoplasmic reticulum. Supposedly, the phytaspase is then secreted through cis/trans Golgi apparatus to the intercellular compartment.

== Involvement in the programmed cell death ==
In contrast with the animal caspases, that exist in the cytoplasm in a form of pre-synthesized precursors, the activation of the phytaspase occurs during its maturation. However, by the time that the phytaspase molecule activates, it becomes physically separated form the supposed intracellular targets by the cell membrane due to the secretion process. Following the programmed cell death triggers, the phytaspase “re-enters” the cell and acts in the water-soluble fraction, where, presumably, it functions to degrade essential components for the cell homeostasis.
