= Mycophenolic acid acyl-glucuronide esterase =

Class of enzymes

Identifiers
- EC no.: 3.1.1.93

Databases
- BRENDA: enzyme data
- ExPASy: NiceZyme view
- KEGG: enzyme entry
- MetaCyc: metabolic pathway
- Rhea: reactions
- PDB structures: RCSB PDB PDBe PDBsum
Search
- PMC: articles
- PubMed: articles
- NCBI: proteins

The enzyme mycophenolic acid acyl-glucuronide esterase (EC 3.1.1.93, mycophenolic acid acyl-glucuronide deglucuronidase; AcMPAG deglucuronidase; systematic name mycophenolic acid O-acyl-glucuronide-ester hydrolase), is in humans encoded by the ABHD10 gene, and catalyses the reaction

mycophenolic acid acyl glucuronide
H_{2}O
mycophenolic acid
+
D-glucuronic acid

This liver enzyme deglucuronidates mycophenolic acid glucuronide (AcMPAG). This compound is an important product in the metabolism of the immunosuppressive drug, mycophenolic acid, and ABHD10 is the major esterase responsible for the AcMPAG and probenecid acyl glucuronide deglucuronidation in human liver.

== Structure ==
=== Gene ===
ABHD10 gene is located at chromosome 3q13.2, consisting of 6 exons.

=== Protein ===
Human ABHD10 is a 297 amino acid protein with a molecular mass of 33 kDa, the mature form of which is a 28-kDa protein and has the nucleophile-His-acid catalytic triad. ABHD10 is a mitochondrial protein with a predicted leader sequence and the proteolytic cleavage site is at residues 46–47.

== Function ==
ABHD10 was identified in 2012, and only two main functions have been reported. First, ABHD10 is involved in the deglucuronidation of AcMPAG in human liver. The activity of this enzyme could attenuate the AcMAPG formation. AcMAPG might be responsible for some adverse effects of mycophenolate mofetil therapy because it promotes the release of TNF-α and IL-6, and it also binds to enzymes that are essential for the control of the energy and redox state of the cells. Thus, the function of ABHD10 could also be regarded as detoxification. Second, ABHD10 counteracts PRAG via deglucuronidation in human liver. As a widely used uricosuric agent, probenecid is mainly metabolized to probenecid acyl glucuronide (PRAG), which is a causal substance of severe allergic or anaphylactoid reaction. The PRAG deglucuronidation catalyzed by ABHD10 could suppress PRAG formation and related adverse reaction.

== Clinical significance ==
Mycophenolate mofetil is the prodrug of mycophenolic acid (MPA) and widely used for the prevention of acute rejection after solid organ transplantation. MPA could be metabolized to AcMPAG, which is responsible for adverse effects of MMF therapy such as leucopenia or gastrointestinal toxicity. Deglucuronidation of AcMPAG may be a detoxification process and human ABHD10 could be a potential therapeutic drug. ABHD10 may also be used to regulate adverse effects of probenecid, because it catalyze the deglucuronidation of PRAG.

== Interactions ==
ABHD10 has also been known to interact with:

- PMSF
- ML257
- Probenecid acyl glucuronide (PRAG)
