= Dicyclohexyl phosphorofluoridate =

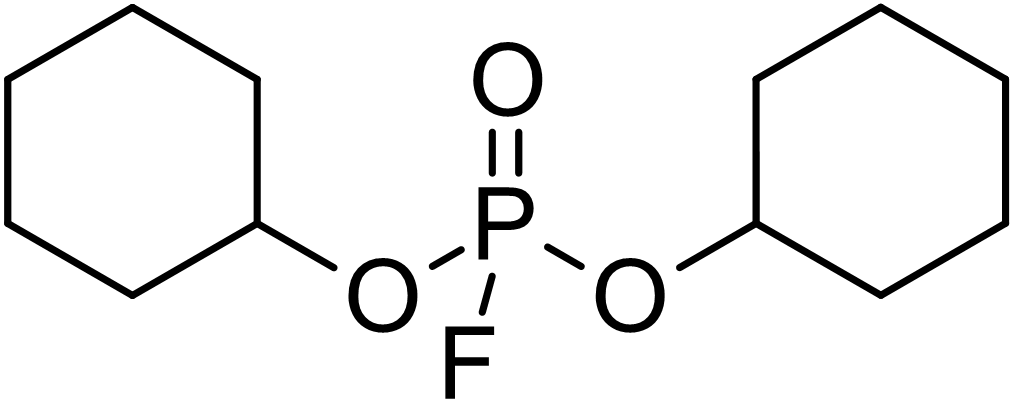

Names
- Other names DCFP; Dicyclohexyl fluorophosphate TL-941; T-1840

Identifiers
| CAS Number | 587-15-5 |
| 3D model (JSmol) | Interactive image |
| ChemSpider | 61793 |
| PubChem CID | 68518 |
| CompTox Dashboard (EPA) | DTXSID60207396 |
- InChI: InChI=1S/C12H22FO3P/c13-17(14,15-11-7-3-1-4-8-11)16-12-9-5-2-6-10-12/h11-12H,1-10H2 Key: NLPYJEIDHPZCCR-UHFFFAOYSA-N
- SMILES: C1CCC(CC1)OP(=O)(OC2CCCCC2)F

Properties
| Chemical formula | C_{12}H_{22}FO_{3}P |
| Molar mass | 264.277 g·mol^{−1} |
| Appearance | Colorless liquid |
| Boiling point | 116 °C (241 °F; 389 K) |

Hazards
- Occupational safety and health (OHS/OSH)
| Main hazards | Extremely toxic |
- Lethal dose or concentration (LD, LC)
| LC_{50} (median concentration) | 110 mg/m3 (inhalation, mice, 10 minutes); 110 mg/m3 (inhalation, rabbits, 10 minutes); 110 mg/m3 (inhalation, rats, 10 minutes) |
- Except where otherwise noted, data are given for materials in their standard state (at 25 °C [77 °F], 100 kPa). Infobox references

Dicyclohexyl phosphorofluoridate (DCFP), also known as TL-941 or T-1840, is an extremely toxic organophosphorus compound with powerful anticholinesterase action. It's a colorless liquid that is extremely resistant to hydrolysis. DCFP can be produced by reaction of cyclohexanol with phosphoryl dichloride fluoride.

== See also ==
- Diisopropyl phosphorofluoridate (DFP)
