= Protease A =

Protease A may refer to one of two enzymes:

- Streptogrisin A
- Omptin
