= Acidic protease =

There are two classes of acidic proteases:

- Aspartic proteases - that use a catalytic aspartic acid in their active site
- Glutamic proteases - that use a catalytic glutamic acid in their active site (less common)
