= Chymotrypsinogen B1 =

Protein found in humans

CTRB1

Identifiers
- Aliases: CTRB1, CTRB, chymotrypsinogen B1
- External IDs: OMIM: 118890; MGI: 88559; GeneCards: CTRB1
Enzyme activity
EC #	BRENDA	ExPASy	KEGG	MetaCyc
3.4.21.1	↗	↗	↗	↗

Gene location (Human)
Chr.	Chromosome 16 (human)
Band	16q23.1	Start	75,218,988 bp
Band	16q23.1	End	75,226,338 bp

Gene location (Mouse)
Chr.	Chromosome 8 (mouse)
Band	8 E1|8 57.98 cM	Start	112,413,151 bp
Band	8 E1|8 57.98 cM	End	112,417,642 bp
RNA expression pattern
Bgee	Human / Mouse (ortholog); Top expressed in: body of pancreas; islet of Langerhans; duodenum; fundus; right coronary artery; ectocervix; right uterine tube; canal of the cervix; testicle; right adrenal gland / Top expressed in: pyloric antrum; islet of Langerhans; migratory enteric neural crest cell; cardiac muscle tissue of left ventricle; plantaris muscle; extensor digitorum longus muscle; interventricular septum; duodenum; corneal stroma; sexually immature organism; More reference expression data
BioGPS	n/a
Gene ontology
Molecular function	peptidase activity; hydrolase activity; serine-type peptidase activity; serine-type endopeptidase activity
Cellular component	extracellular region; extracellular space
Biological process	digestion; cobalamin metabolic process; extracellular matrix disassembly; proteolysis
Sources:Amigo / QuickGO
Orthologs
Databases	NCBI: entry; OMA: entry
Species	Human	Mouse
Entrez	1504	66473
Ensembl	ENSG00000168925; ENSG00000285346	ENSMUSG00000031957
UniProt	P17538	Q9CR35
RefSeq (mRNA)	NM_001906; NM_001329190	NM_025583
RefSeq (protein)	NP_001316119; NP_001897	NP_079859
Location (UCSC)	Chr 16: 75.22 – 75.23 Mb	Chr 8: 112.41 – 112.42 Mb
PubMed search
- Wikidata
View/Edit Human	View/Edit Mouse

Chymotrypsinogen B1 (or sometimes just Chymotrypsinogen B) is a protein that in humans is encoded by the CTRB1 gene. Similar to its paralog chymotrypsinogen B2, chymotrypsiongen B1 is an inactive precursor for an enzyme which is an isozyme of chymotrypsin. It is secreted by the acinar cells of the pancreas into the small intestines as part of pancreatic juice, where it is activated. After activation it functions as a protease which is involved in breaking down other proteins as part of digestion.

== Medical significance ==
The CTRB1 and CTRB2 genes are located near each other on chromosome 16. In some populations there is an inversion which causes certain parts of each gene to be swapped, which has been associated with an increased risk of chronic pancreatitis.
