= (S)-N-acetyl-1-phenylethylamine hydrolase =

Class of enzymes

Identifiers
- EC no.: 3.5.1.85
- CAS no.: 192230-94-7

Databases
- IntEnz: IntEnz view
- BRENDA: BRENDA entry
- ExPASy: NiceZyme view
- KEGG: KEGG entry
- MetaCyc: metabolic pathway
- PRIAM: profile
- PDB structures: RCSB PDB PDBe PDBsum
- Gene Ontology: AmiGO / QuickGO
Search
- PMC: articles
- PubMed: articles
- NCBI: proteins

In enzymology, a (S)-N-acetyl-1-phenylethylamine hydrolase (EC 3.5.1.85) is an enzyme that catalyzes the chemical reaction

N-acetylphenylethylamine + H_{2}O $\rightleftharpoons$ phenethylamine + acetate

Thus, the two substrates of this enzyme are N-acetylphenylethylamine and H_{2}O, whereas its two products are phenethylamine and acetate.

This enzyme belongs to the family of hydrolases, those acting on carbon-nitrogen bonds other than peptide bonds, specifically in linear amides. The systematic name of this enzyme class is (S)-N-acetylphenylethylamine:H_{2}O hydrolase. At least one compound, phenylmethanesulfonylfluoride is known to inhibit this enzyme.
