= Phosphoryl dichloride fluoride =

Chemical compound

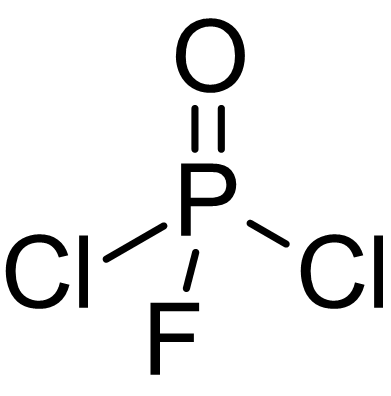

Names
- Other names Phosphorus oxydichlorofluoride, TL-191, Phosphoryl dichlorofluoride

Identifiers
CAS Number	13769-76-1
3D model (JSmol)	Interactive image
ChemSpider	109931
PubChem CID	123328
CompTox Dashboard (EPA)	DTXSID30929871
- InChI: InChI=1S/Cl2FOP/c1-5(2,3)4 Key: YNECJZSONMVFHE-UHFFFAOYSA-N
- SMILES: O=P(F)(Cl)Cl

Properties
Chemical formula	Cl_{2}FOP
Molar mass	136.87 g·mol^{−1}
Boiling point	52 °C
- Except where otherwise noted, data are given for materials in their standard state (at 25 °C [77 °F], 100 kPa). Infobox references

Phosphoryl dichloride fluoride is an inorganic compound with the chemical formula POFCl_{2}.

== Synthesis ==
It is made by reacting phosphorus pentachloride with potassium monofluorophosphate:

K_{2}PO_{3}F + 2PCl_{5} → POFCl_{2} + 2POCl_{3} + 2KCl

== Reactions ==
The reaction with two equivalents of cyclohexanol yields the nerve agent dicyclohexyl phosphorofluoridate.

The same reaction with isopropanol instead of cyclohexanol yields the nerve agent diisopropyl fluorophosphate.

Two equivalents of sodium azide can replace the chlorine atoms with azide groups. Silver cyanate can replace them with cyanate groups. Hexamethyldisiloxane can replace one of the two chlorine atoms with a trimethylsilyl ether.
