= Chymotrypsinogen B2 =

Protein found in humans

CTRB2

Identifiers
- Aliases: CTRB2, chymotrypsinogen B2
- External IDs: MGI: 88559; GeneCards: CTRB2
Enzyme activity
EC #	BRENDA	ExPASy	KEGG	MetaCyc
3.4.21.1	↗	↗	↗	↗

Gene location (Human)
Chr.	Chromosome 16 (human)
Band	16q23.1	Start	75,204,103 bp
Band	16q23.1	End	75,207,161 bp

Gene location (Mouse)
Chr.	Chromosome 8 (mouse)
Band	8 E1|8 57.98 cM	Start	112,413,151 bp
Band	8 E1|8 57.98 cM	End	112,417,642 bp
RNA expression pattern
Bgee	Human / Mouse (ortholog); Top expressed in: body of pancreas; islet of Langerhans; gonad; fundus; right coronary artery; duodenum; ectocervix; left uterine tube; placenta; canal of the cervix / Top expressed in: pyloric antrum; islet of Langerhans; migratory enteric neural crest cell; cardiac muscle tissue of left ventricle; plantaris muscle; extensor digitorum longus muscle; interventricular septum; duodenum; corneal stroma; sexually immature organism; More reference expression data
BioGPS	n/a
Gene ontology
Molecular function	peptidase activity; hydrolase activity; serine-type endopeptidase activity; serine-type peptidase activity
Cellular component	extracellular region; extracellular space
Biological process	digestion; cobalamin metabolic process; extracellular matrix disassembly; proteolysis
Sources:Amigo / QuickGO
Orthologs
Databases	NCBI: entry; OMA: entry
Species	Human	Mouse
Entrez	440387	66473
Ensembl	ENSG00000168928; ENSG00000284810	ENSMUSG00000031957
UniProt	Q6GPI1	Q9CR35
RefSeq (mRNA)	NM_001025200	NM_025583
RefSeq (protein)	NP_001020371	NP_079859
Location (UCSC)	Chr 16: 75.2 – 75.21 Mb	Chr 8: 112.41 – 112.42 Mb
PubMed search
- Wikidata
View/Edit Human	View/Edit Mouse

Chymotrypsinogen B2 is a protein that in humans is encoded by the CTRB2 gene. Chymotrypsinogen B2 is an inactive precursor enzyme (or zymogen) for an active enzyme, which is sometimes called chymotrypsin B2. This enzyme is an isozyme of chymotrypsin that participates in the digestion and breakdown of proteins. The inactive protein is produced by the acinar cells in the pancreas, then secreted into the small intestines where it is cleaved and activated by trypsin, another digestive enzyme. After cleaving, Chymotrypsin B2 is composed of 3 peptide chains which remain connected via disulfide bridges.

== See also ==
- Chymotrypsinogen B1
