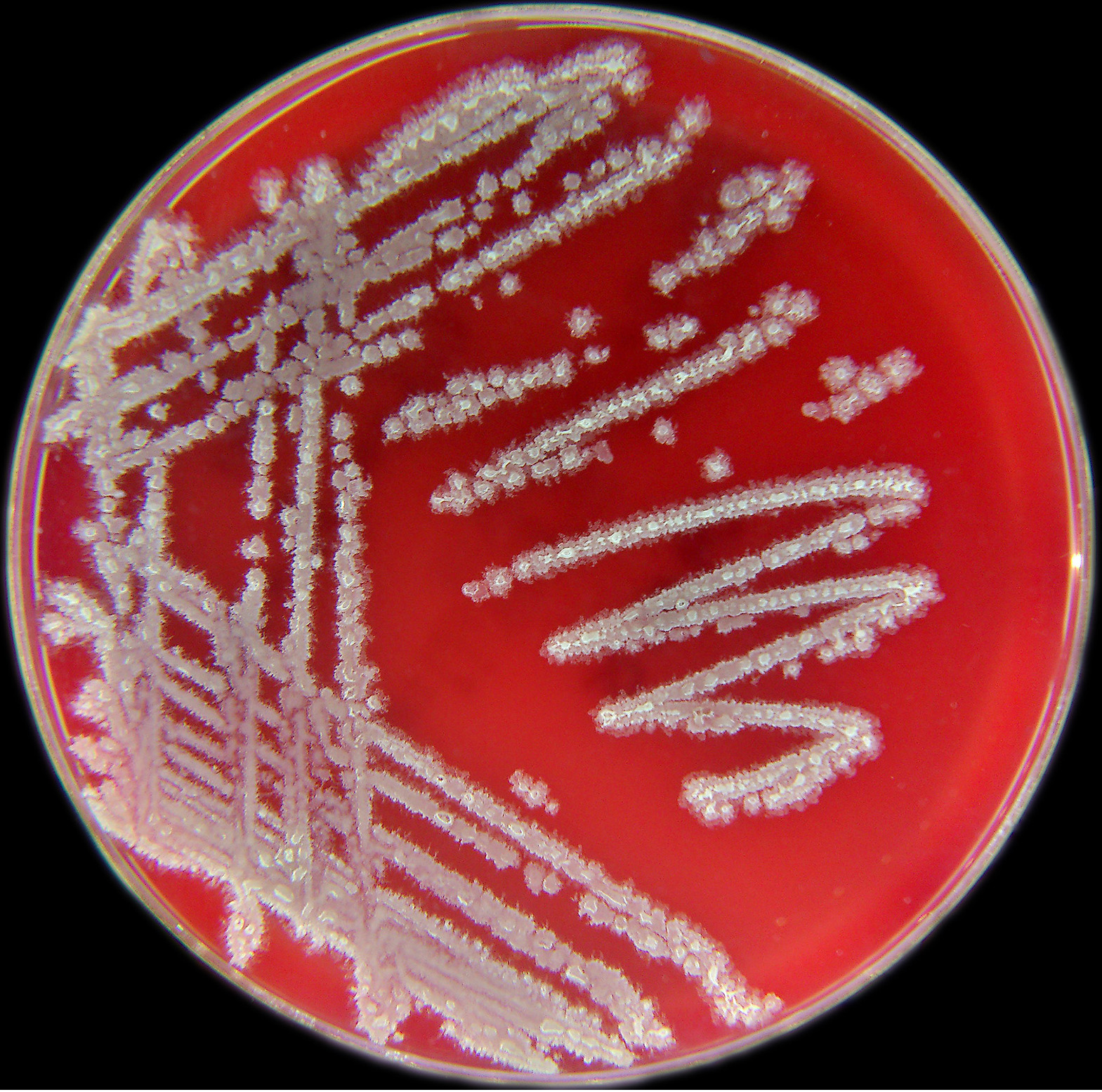
- Bacillus licheniformis colonies on a blood agar plate.

Scientific classification
- Domain: Bacteria
- Kingdom: Bacillati
- Phylum: Bacillota
- Class: Bacilli
- Order: Caryophanales
- Family: Bacillaceae
- Genus: Bacillus
- Species: B. licheniformis

Binomial name
- Bacillus licheniformis (Weigmann 1898) Chester 1901

= Bacillus licheniformis =

Species of bacterium

Bacillus licheniformis is a bacterium commonly found in the soil. It is found on bird feathers, especially chest and back plumage, and most often in ground-dwelling birds (like sparrows) and aquatic species (like ducks).

It is a gram-positive, mesophilic bacterium. Its optimal growth temperature is around 50 °C, though it can survive at much higher temperatures. The optimal temperature for enzyme secretion is 37 °C. It can exist in a dormant spore form to resist harsh environments, or in a vegetative state when conditions are good.

High capacity of secretion of the alkaline serine protease has made B. licheniformis one of the most important bacteria in industrial enzyme production. Subtilisin Carlsberg (P00780) secreted by B. licheniformis is used as a detergent protease. It is sold under the name Alcalase by Novozymes. A small antisense RNA against Subtilisin Carlsberg named BLi_r0872 was discovered in an RNA-seq based study. It may have a putative impact on protease production and serve as target for strain improvement.

Scientists are currently exploring its ability to degrade feathers for agricultural purposes. Feathers contain high amounts of non-digestible proteins, but researchers hope that, through fermentation with B. licheniformis, they can use waste feathers to produce cheap and nutritious feather meal to feed livestock.

Furthermore, the commercial production of keratin microfibers from feathers has already been optimized, notably by the Swedish company Bioextrax. The applications of these fully bio-based microfibers range from composites to agriculture, filtration, padding, textiles and more.

Ecological research is also being done looking at the interaction between plumage colors and B. licheniformis activity, and the consequences thereof. Feather degrading bacteria may have played an important role in the evolution of molting, and patterns in feather coloration (Gloger's Rule).

== Description ==
B. licheniformis is a Gram positive, spore-forming, facultative anaerobic, rod-shaped bacterium. It was initially named Clostridium licheniforme by H. Weigmann and renamed Bacillus licheniformis by Frederick D. Chester. B. licheniformis displays a variety of colony morphologies, with the rough "licheniform" colonies giving the organism its name. Colonies tend to be cream-colored, but will turn red in the presence of iron in media, most likely as a result of pulcherrimin. B. licheniformis is found in a wide variety of environments, but especially in soil and in the feathers of birds, where B. licheniformis degrades β-keratin. There is evidence that red feathers, with psittacofulvin, are more resistant to degradation.

== Applications ==
=== Industrial enzymes ===
Subtilisin Carlsberg, a serine protease secreted by B. licheniformis, is used in laundry detergent formulations due to its ability to perform at high pH levels (optimal activity is between 8.0 and 10.0) and high temperatures (40–50 °C or 104–122 °F).

Amylases are also synthesized by B. licheniformis and used for industrial purposes.

=== Probiotics ===
B. licheniformis is used as a probiotic in animal feed, where isolates have been shown to prevent disease and promote growth as well as being commercially available. Some isolates have also been found to be probiotic in humans (and are also commercially available), but it's been mentioned that clinical trials have not been performed on many of them yet.

=== Other applications ===
B. licheniformis also shows possible applications in bioremediation, biomineralization, and biofuels.

The keratinases it produces can be used to digest feather meal into more digestible components, though no such product has been commercialized as of Feb 2025. Feather meal hydrolysates obtained from B. licheniformis fermentation showed enrichment in specific amino acids such as phenylalanine, lysine, and tyrosine, due to their secretion from the bacteria

== Natural genetic transformation ==
B. licheniformis is naturally competent for genetic transformation. Natural genetic transformation is a sexual process involving DNA transfer from one bacterium to another through the intervening medium, and the integration of the donor sequence into the recipient genome by homologous recombination.

== Pathogenicity and food spoilage ==
Bacillus licheniformis has been found to cause infection in several cases of immunocompromised patients. B. licheniformis has been found to be the causative agent of ventriculitis, ophthalmitis, bacteremia, peritonitis, and endocarditis. B. licheniformis is also known to contaminate food, especially dairy, as well as causing "ropiness" in bread. There is evidence that contamination may be a result of a toxin.

== Identification ==
Below is a list of differential techniques and results that can help to identify Bacillus licheniformis from other bacteria and Bacillus species.

- Anaerobic Growth: Positive
- Voges Proskauer test: Positive
- Acid produced from
  - D-glucose: Positive
  - L-arabinose: Positive
  - D-mannitol: Positive
- Starch hydrolysis: Positive
- Nitrate reduction: Positive
- Degradation of tyrosine: Negative
- Growth at
  - 10 °C: Negative
  - 50 °C: Positive
  - 55 °C: Positive
- Utilization of citrate: Positive
