= Aspergillopepsin II =

Aspergilloglutamic peptidase
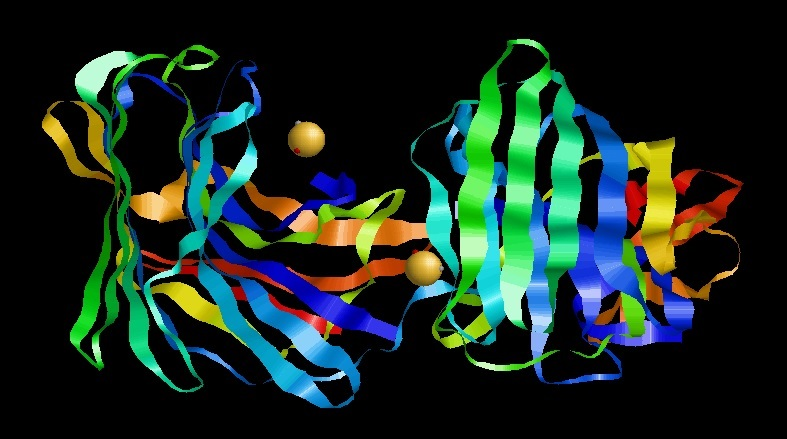
- Aspergilloglutamic peptidase dimer

Identifiers
- EC no.: 3.4.23.19
- CAS no.: 9025-49-4

Databases
- IntEnz: IntEnz view
- BRENDA: BRENDA entry
- ExPASy: NiceZyme view
- KEGG: KEGG entry
- MetaCyc: metabolic pathway
- PRIAM: profile
- PDB structures: RCSB PDB PDBe PDBsum
Search
- PMC: articles
- PubMed: articles
- NCBI: proteins

Aspergilloglutamic peptidase, also called aspergillopepsin II (EC 3.4.23.19, proctase A, Aspergillus niger acid proteinase A, Aspergillus niger var. macrosporus aspartic proteinase) is a proteolytic enzyme. The enzyme was previously thought be an aspartic protease, but it was later shown to be a glutamic protease with a catalytic Glu residue at the active site, and was therefore renamed aspergilloglutamic peptidase.

Determination of its molecular structure showed it to be a unique two-chain enzyme with a light chain and a heavy chain bound non-covalently with each other. The C-terminal region of the light chain of one molecule binds to the active site cleft of another molecule in the manner of a substrate.

This enzyme catalyses the following chemical reaction

Preferential cleavage in B chain of insulin: Asn^{3}-Gln, Gly1^{3}-Ala, Tyr^{26}-Thr

This enzyme is isolated from Aspergillus niger var. macrosporus.
