= Glutamic protease =

Group of proteolytic enzymes

Scytalidopepsin B
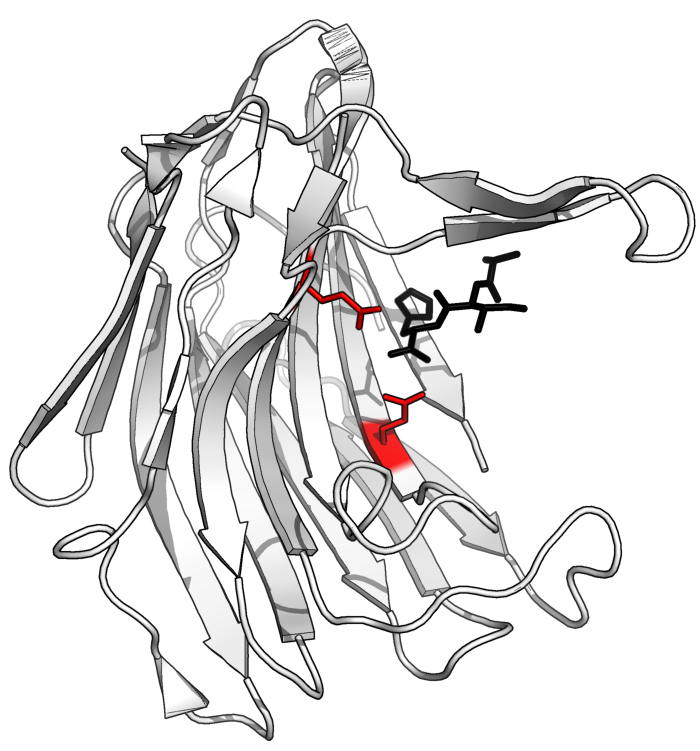
- Structure of scytalidocarboxyl peptidase B, with cleaved peptide product in black and active site glutamate-glutamine dyad side chains in red. (PDB: 1S2K)

Identifiers
- Organism: Scytalidium lignicola
- Symbol: N/A
- Orthologs: OMA: entry
- PDB: 1S2K
- UniProt: P15369

Other data
- EC number: 3.4.23.32
Search for
- Structures: Swiss-model
- Domains: InterPro

Glutamic proteases are a group of proteolytic enzymes containing a glutamic acid residue within the active site. This type of protease was first described in 2004 and became the sixth catalytic type of protease. Members of this group of protease had been previously assumed to be an aspartate protease, but structural determination showed it to belong to a novel protease family. The first structure of this group of protease was scytalidoglutamic peptidase, the active site of which contains a catalytic dyad, glutamic acid (E) and glutamine (Q), which give rise to the name eqolisin. This group of proteases are found primarily in pathogenic fungi affecting plant and human.

== Distribution and types ==
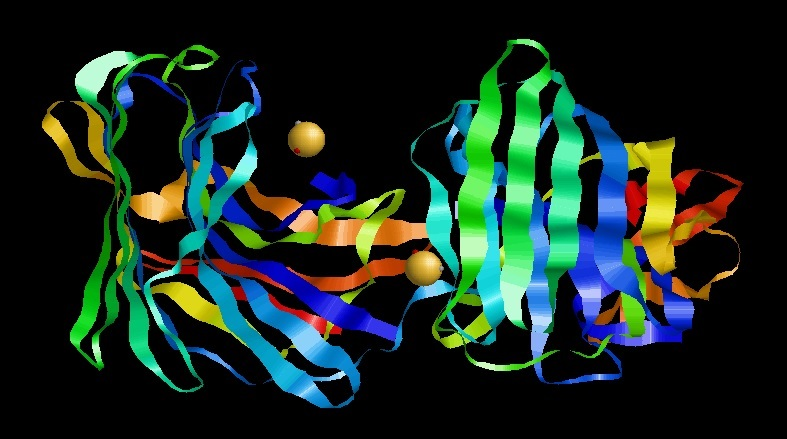
Aspergilloglutamic peptidase dimer

There are two independent families of glutamic proteases (G1 and G2), and have a limited distribution. They were originally thought to be limited to filamentous fungi mainly in the Ascomycota phylum. Subsequently, however, glutamic proteases have been identified in bacteria and archaea. A glutamic protease from a plant virus (strawberry mottle virus) has also been identified.

The first superfamily of glutamic proteases was identified in the fungi Scytalidium lignicola and Aspergillus niger var. macrosporus, from which scytalidoglutamic peptidase (eqolisin) and aspergilloglutamic peptidase are derived respectively. These two proteases contain active site Glu and Gln residues and are grouped under MEROPS family G1.

A convergently evolved glutamic peptidase, the pre-neck appendage protein (bacteriophage phi-29), uses a Glu and Asp dyad at the active site, and is classified as MEROPS family G2.

== Properties ==
These enzymes are acid proteases; eqolisin for example is most active at pH 2.0 when casein is used as substrate. Eqolosins prefer bulky amino acid residues at the P1 site and small amino acid residues at the P1′ site. A characteristic of the protease is its insensitivity to pepstatin and S-PI (acetyl pepstatin) and it was previously classed as "pepstatin-insensitive carboxyl proteinases". The other "pepstatin-insensitive carboxyl proteinases" belongs to subfamily of serine protease, serine-carboxyl protease (sedolisin) which was discovered in 2001. These proteases are also not inhibited by DAN (diazoacetyl-DL-norleucine methylester) (7) but may be inhibited by EPNP (1,2-epoxy-3-(p-nitrophenoxy) propane).

== Active site and mechanism of catalysis ==
The active site of eqolosin contains a distinctive glutamic acid and glutamine catalytic dyad which are involved in substrate binding and catalysis. These residues act as a nucleophile, with the glutamic acid serving as a general acid in the first phase of the reaction, donating a proton to the carbonyl oxygen in the peptide bond of the substrate. One or two water molecules may be involved in the reaction supplying a hydroxyl group, and the glutamic acid further donates a proton to the amide nitrogen, resulting in breakage of the peptide bond. The glutamine then returns the glutamic acid to its initial state.

== See also ==
- Aspartic protease
