= Nodavirus endopeptidase =

Identifiers
- EC no.: 3.4.23.44
- CAS no.: 852954-38-2

Databases
- IntEnz: IntEnz view
- BRENDA: BRENDA entry
- ExPASy: NiceZyme view
- KEGG: KEGG entry
- MetaCyc: metabolic pathway
- PRIAM: profile
- PDB structures: RCSB PDB PDBe PDBsum
Search
- PMC: articles
- PubMed: articles
- NCBI: proteins

Nodavirus endopeptidase (EC 3.4.23.44, Black Beetle virus endopeptidase, Flock House virus endopeptidase) is an enzyme. This enzyme catalyses the following chemical reaction

Hydrolysis of an asparaginyl bond involved in the maturation of the structural protein of the virus, typically -Asn-Ala- or -Asn-Phe-

The enzyme is coded by several nodaviruses that are insect pathogens.
