= Diisopropyl fluorophosphate =

Chemical compound

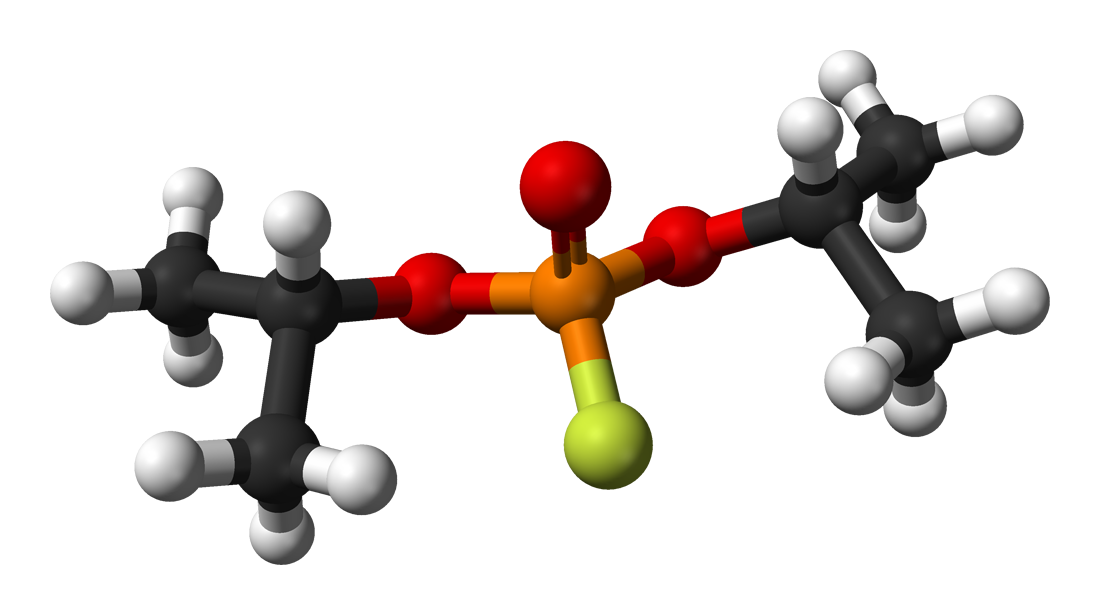

Clinical data
- Other names: Isofluorophate; Isofluorphate; DFP; DIFP; DIPF; Diisopropyl phosphorofluoridate; EA-1152; PF-3; T-1703; TL-466
- ATC code: S01EB07 (WHO)

Identifiers
- IUPAC name: bis(propan-2-yl) fluorophosphonate
- CAS Number: 55-91-4
- PubChem CID: 5936
- DrugBank: DB00677
- ChemSpider: 5723
- UNII: 12UHW9R67N
- KEGG: D00043
- ChEBI: CHEBI:17941
- ChEMBL: ChEMBL1025
- CompTox Dashboard (EPA): DTXSID1040667
- ECHA InfoCard: 100.000.225

Chemical and physical data
- Formula: C_{6}H_{14}FO_{3}P
- Molar mass: 184.147 g·mol^{−1}
- 3D model (JSmol): Interactive image
- Melting point: −82 °C (−116 °F)
- Boiling point: 183 °C (361 °F)
- SMILES: FP(=O)(OC(C)C)OC(C)C
- InChI: InChI=1S/C6H14FO3P/c1-5(2)9-11(7,8)10-6(3)4/h5-6H,1-4H3; Key:MUCZHBLJLSDCSD-UHFFFAOYSA-N

Diisopropyl fluorophosphate (DFP) or Isofluorophate is an oily, colorless liquid with the chemical formula C_{6}H_{14}FO_{3}P. It was once used to treat glaucoma and is currently used as an organophosphorus insecticide. It is stable, but undergoes hydrolysis when subjected to moisture.

== Uses in medicine ==
Diisopropyl fluorophosphate is a parasympathomimetic drug irreversible anti-cholinesterase and has been used in ophthalmology as a miotic agent in treatment of chronic glaucoma, as a miotic in veterinary medicine, and as an experimental agent in neuroscience because of its acetylcholinesterase inhibitory properties and ability to induce delayed peripheral neuropathy.

It is marketed under many brand names including Difluorophate, Diflupyl, Diflurphate, Dyflos, Dyphlos, Fluropryl, Fluostigmine, Neoglaucit.

== Uses as a toxin ==
Diisopropyl fluorophosphate (DFP) was a nerve gas developed by the German during the Second World War. DFP irreversibly binds with the enzymes containing serine at the active site, e.g. serine proteases, cholinesterase.

The marked toxicity of esters of monofluorophosphoric acid was discovered in 1932, when Willy Lange and his PhD student Gerda von Krueger prepared the methyl, ethyl, n-propyl, and n-butyl esters and incidentally experienced their toxic effects. Another homologue of this series of esters, diisopropyl fluorophosphate, was developed by British scientist Bernard Charles Saunders. On his search for compounds to be used as chemical warfare agents, Saunders was inspired by the report by Lange and Krueger and decided to prepare the new homologue which he labeled PF-3. It was much less effective as a chemical weapon than the later G series agents. It was often mixed with mustard gas, forming a more effective mixture with significantly lower melting point, resulting in an agent suitable for use in cold weather.

Reaction of the DIFP with a serine-containing enzyme

Diisopropyl fluorophosphate is a very potent neurotoxin. Its LD_{50} in rats is 6 mg/kg (oral). It combines with the amino acid serine at the active site of the enzyme acetylcholinesterase, an enzyme that deactivates the neurotransmitter acetylcholine. Neurotransmitters are needed to continue the passage of nerve impulses from one neuron to another across the synapse. Once the impulse has been transmitted, acetylcholinesterase functions to deactivate the acetylcholine almost immediately by breaking it down. If the enzyme is inhibited, acetylcholine accumulates and nerve impulses cannot be stopped, causing prolonged muscle contraction. Paralysis occurs and death may result since the respiratory muscles are affected.

== Use in research ==
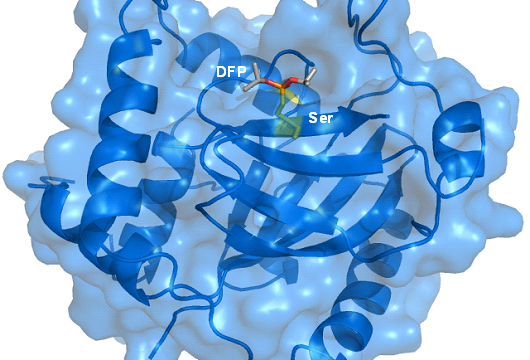
Crystal structure of Herpes Simplex Virus Protease/Inhibiton complex. The active site serine (yellow) has undergone phosphonylation by DFP, resulting in irreversible inhibition. Rendered from PDB 1AT3.

In military research, due to its physical and chemical similarities and comparatively low toxicity, it is used as a simulant of G-agents (GA, GB, GD, and GF). Diisopropyl fluorophosphate is used in civilian laboratories to mimic lethal nerve gas exposure or organophosphate toxicities. It has also been used to develop a rodent model of Gulf War Syndrome.

DFP also inhibits serine proteases. It is a useful additive for protein or cell isolation procedures.

== Production ==
Isoflurophate, the diisopropyl ester of fluorophosphoric acid, is made by reacting isopropyl alcohol with phosphorus trichloride, forming diisopropylphosphite, which is chlorinated and further reacted with sodium fluoride to replace the chlorine atom with fluorine, thus giving diisopropyl fluorophosphate.

Another synthesis that is only of academic interest entails the reaction between two equivalents of isopropyl alcohol and phosphoryl dichloride fluoride.

== Biochemistry ==
DFP is a diagnostic test for the presence of the active site Ser in serine proteases, as well as a serine protease inhibitor. PMSF and AEBSF are less toxic alternatives that work well for most serine proteases. However, only DFP potently inhibits a subclass of serine proteases collectively known as neutrophil serine proteases (namely, neutrophil elastase, cathepsin G, and proteinase 3). DFP and other analogous organophosphate neurotoxins are inactivated by the enzyme paraoxonase, which is present in widely varying levels in humans.

== See also ==
- MAFP (methoxy arachidonoylfluorophosphonate), a mechanistically related inhibitor
- Neopentylene fluorophosphate, a cyclic analogue
- Sarin (isopropyl methylphosphonofluoridate), a related phosphofluoridate
- PMSF (4-(2-aminoethyl)benzenesulfonyl fluoride), an analogous sulfonyl fluoride sulfonating reagent
- AEBSF (phenylmethylsulfonyl fluoride), an analogous sulfonyl fluoride sulfonating reagent
