= PMSF =

Phenylmethylsulfonyl fluoride (PMSF)

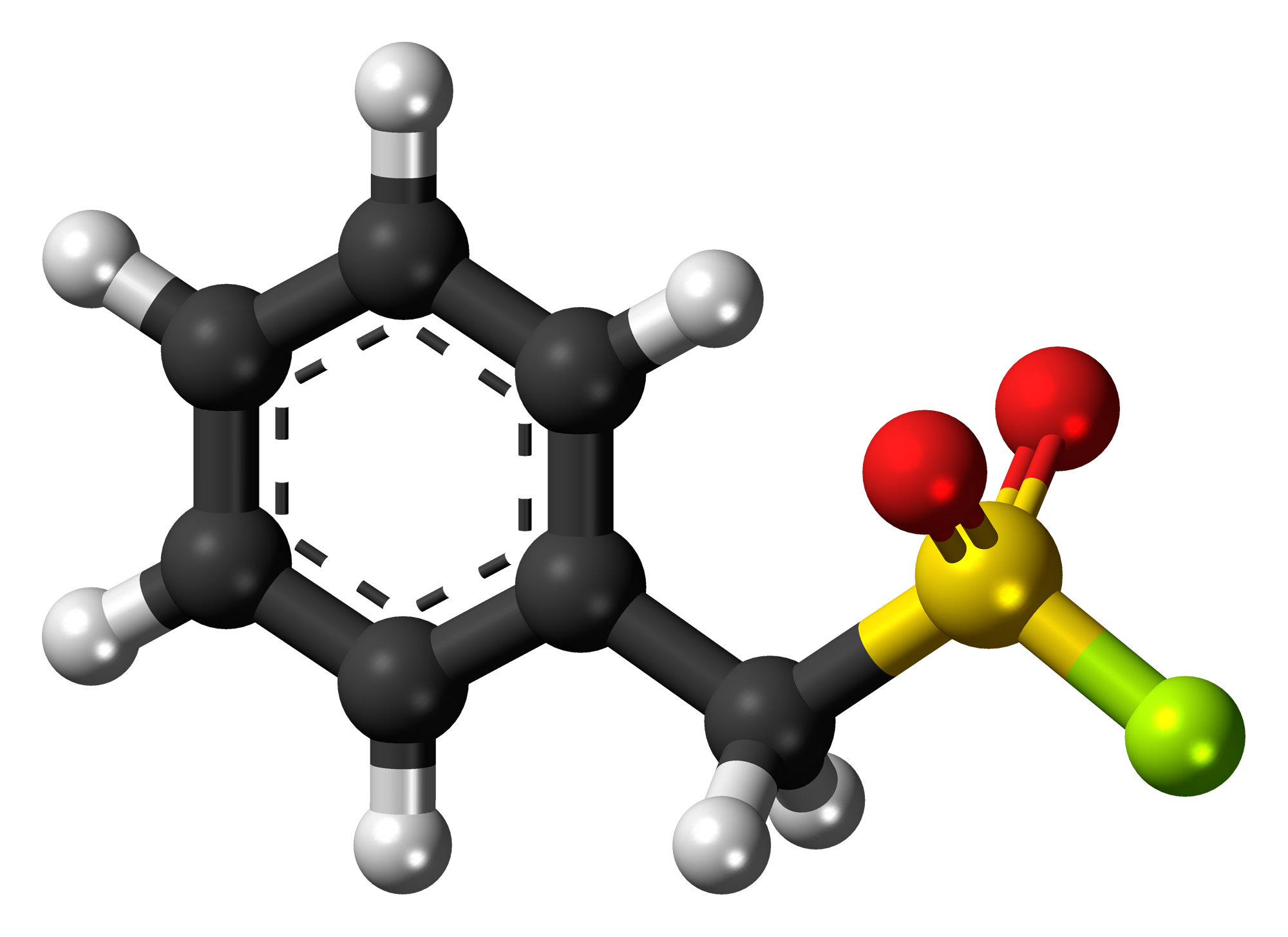

Names
- Preferred IUPAC name Phenylmethanesulfonyl fluoride
- Other names Phenylmethylsulfonylfluoride; Phenylmethylsulphonylfluoride

Identifiers
CAS Number	329-98-6
3D model (JSmol)	Interactive image
ChEBI	CHEBI:8102
ChEMBL	ChEMBL190503
ChemSpider	4620
ECHA InfoCard	100.005.774
KEGG	C06747
MeSH	Phenylmethylsulfonyl+fluoride
PubChem CID	4784
UNII	57KD15003I
CompTox Dashboard (EPA)	DTXSID6059819
- InChI: InChI=1S/C7H7FO2S/c8-11(9,10)6-7-4-2-1-3-5-7/h1-5H,6H2 Key: YBYRMVIVWMBXKQ-UHFFFAOYSA-N; InChI=1/C7H7FO2S/c8-11(9,10)6-7-4-2-1-3-5-7/h1-5H,6H2 Key: YBYRMVIVWMBXKQ-UHFFFAOYAF
- SMILES: O=S(F)(=O)Cc1ccccc1

Properties
Chemical formula	C_{7}H_{7}FO_{2}S
Molar mass	174.19 g·mol^{−1}
Appearance	Powder
- Except where otherwise noted, data are given for materials in their standard state (at 25 °C [77 °F], 100 kPa). verify (what is ?) Infobox references

In biochemistry, phenylmethylsulfonyl fluoride (or phenylmethylsulphonyl fluoride in British English) (PMSF) is a serine protease inhibitor (serine hydrolase inactivator) commonly used in the preparation of cell lysates. PMSF does not inactivate all serine proteases. The effective concentration of PMSF is between 0.1 - 1 mM. The half-life is short in aqueous solutions (110 min at pH 7, 55 min at pH 7.5, and 35 min at pH 8, all at 25 °C). At 4˚C, pH 8, PMSF is almost completely degraded after 1 day. Stock solutions are usually made up in anhydrous ethanol, isopropanol, or corn oil and diluted immediately before use.

PMSF reacts specifically with the active site serine residue in serine hydrolases. It does not bind to any other serine residues in the protein. This is a result of the hyperactivity of that serine residue caused by the specific environmental conditions in the enzyme's active site (catalytic triad). Because PMSF bonds covalently to the enzyme, the complex can be viewed by X-ray crystallography; it can therefore be used as a chemical label to identify an essential active site serine in an enzyme.

Enzyme(active)Ser-O-H + F-SO_{2}CH_{2}C_{6}H_{5} → EnzymeSer-O-SO_{2}CH_{2}C_{6}H_{5} + HF

Serine protease + PMSF → Irreversible enzyme-PMS complex + HF

The median lethal dose between 150–215 mg/kg (acetylcholine esterase inactivator). PMSF should be handled only inside a fume hood and while wearing gloves. DMSO is sometimes recommended as solvent for stock solutions, but should not be used as it makes intact skin permeable to PMSF.

== Stability ==
The stability of PMSF in aqueous solutions is low, as it undergoes hydrolysis with water. PMSF is reportedly stable for ~6 months at -20˚C in DMSO, and 9 months at room temperature in 100% isopropanol.

== Insensitive serine enzymes ==
Some proteins structure limit the accessibility of comparatively bulky PMSF, and therefore PMSF is inactive against these serine enzymes like palmitoyl-protein thioesterase. Alternative sulfonyl fluoride reagents like p-APMSF and HDSF, have altered access to native folded protein structures, and may react with serine enzymes that PMSF cannot efficiently react with. This altered selectivity between sulfonyl fluoride reagents has been used to classify and isolate particular types of serine enzymes.

== See also ==
- AEBSF
- DFP (diisopropyl fluorophosphate), an analogous fluorophosphonate phosphorylating reagent
