= MEROPS =

Online molecular biology database

Content
- Description: MEROPS: the database of proteolytic enzymes, their substrates and inhibitors.

Contact
- Research center: The Wellcome Trust Sanger Institute
- Authors: Neil D Rawlings
- Primary citation: Rawlings & al. (2012)
- Release date: 2010

Access
- Website: https://www.ebi.ac.uk/merops/

MEROPS is an online database for peptidases (also known as proteases, proteinases and proteolytic enzymes) and their inhibitors. The classification scheme for peptidases was published by Rawlings & Barrett in 1993, and that for protein inhibitors by Rawlings et al. in 2004. The most recent version, MEROPS 12.5, was released in September 2023.

== Overview ==
The classification is based on similarities at the tertiary and primary structural levels. Comparisons are restricted to that part of the sequence directly involved in the reaction, which in the case of a peptidase must include the active site, and for a protein inhibitor the reactive site. The classification is hierarchical: sequences are assembled into families, and families are assembled into clans. Each peptidase, family, and clan has a unique identifier.

== Classification ==
=== Family ===
The families of peptidases are constructed by comparisons of amino acid sequences. A family is assembled around a type example, the sequence of a well-characterized peptidase or inhibitor. All other sequences in the family must be related to the family type example, either directly or through a transitive relationship involving one or more sequences already shown to be family members. Typically, FastA or BlastP is used to establish sequence relationships, with an expect value of 0.001 or lower taken to be statistically significant. HMMER or psi-blast searches are used for adding sequences which are distantly related to a family. Each family is identified by a letter representing the catalytic type of the peptidases it contains followed by an arbitrary unique number.

Some families are divided into subfamilies due to evidence of very ancient divergence within the family. The divergence corresponds to more than 150 accepted point mutations per 100 amino acid residues.

=== Clan ===
The similarity in three-dimensional structures supports the evidence that many of the families do share common ancestry with others. "Clan" is used to describe such a group of families. A clan is also assembled around a type example, this being the structure of a well-characterized peptidase or inhibitor. A family is included in a clan if the tertiary structure of a family member can be shown to be related to that of the clan type example. Typically, DALI is used to establish clan membership, with a z score of 6.00 standard deviation units or above considered to be statistically significant. For peptidases, other evidence to indicate that families are related when a tertiary structure is absent includes the same order of catalytic residues in the sequences.

== Identifier ==
Each family, clan, peptidase, and inhibitor has a unique identifier. Description and example of identifiers are shown in the table below.

Type	Identifier Description	Identifier example
Family	Letter indicating the catalytic type followed by a serial number of up to two digits	A1
Clan	The first letter indicating the catalytic type followed by a serial letter	AA
Peptidase	Family name (padded with zeros if necessary to make it three characters long), a dot and a three-digit serial number	A01.001
Inhibitor	The initial 'I' followed by family name (padded with zeros), a dot and three-digit serial number	I10.001
Compound Inhibitor	The initial ‘L’ is for any compound inhibitor. 'L' is followed by the family name of the inhibitor units (padded to three characters). Following the dash, there is a three-digit serial number	LI01-001
Small-molecule inhibitor	Each SMI is assigned an identifier consisting of an initial J followed by a five-digit number	J00095

== See also ==
- The Proteolysis Map
- TopFIND, a scientific database covering proteases, their cleavage site specificity, substrates, inhibitors and protein termini originating from their activity
- Protein superfamily
- PA clan
- Catalytic triad
