= N-terminus =

Start of a polypeptide

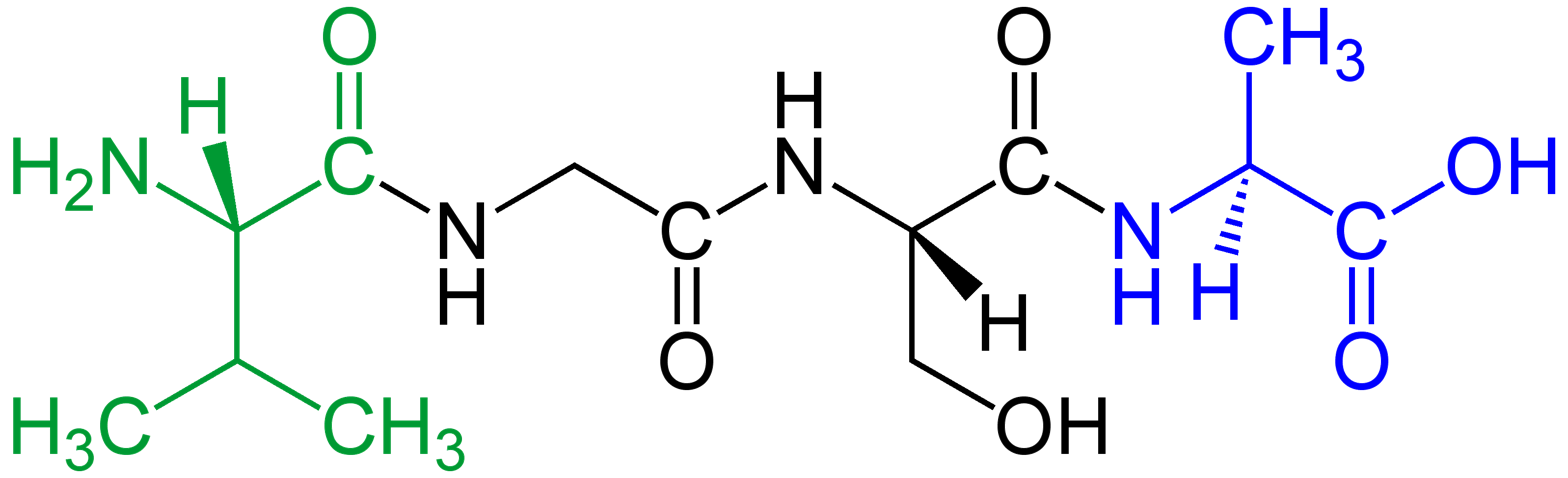
A tetrapeptide (example: Val-Gly-Ser-Ala) with green highlighted N-terminal α-amino acid (example: L-valine) and blue marked C-terminal α-amino acid (example: L-alanine). This tetrapeptide could be encoded by the mRNA sequence 5'-GUU GGU AGU GCU-3'.

The N-terminus (also known as the amino-terminus, NH_{2}-terminus, N-terminal end or amine-terminus) is the start of a protein or polypeptide, referring to the free amine group (-NH_{2}) located at the end of a polypeptide. Within a peptide, the amine group is bonded to the carboxylic group of another amino acid, making it a chain. That leaves a free carboxylic group at one end of the peptide, called the C-terminus, and a free amine group on the other end called the N-terminus. By convention, peptide sequences are written N-terminus to C-terminus, left to right (in LTR writing systems). This correlates the translation direction to the text direction, because when a protein is translated from messenger RNA, it is created from the N-terminus to the C-terminus, as amino acids are added to the carboxyl end of the protein.

== Chemistry ==
Each amino acid has an amine group and a carboxylic group. Amino acids link to one another by peptide bonds which form through a dehydration reaction that joins the carboxyl group of one amino acid to the amine group of the next in a head-to-tail manner to form a polypeptide chain. The chain has two ends – an amine group, the N-terminus, and an unbound carboxyl group, the C-terminus.

When a protein is translated from messenger RNA, it is created from N-terminus to C-terminus. The amino end of an amino acid (on a charged tRNA) during the elongation stage of translation, attaches to the carboxyl end of the growing chain. Since the start codon of the genetic code codes for the amino acid methionine, most protein sequences start with a methionine (or, in bacteria, mitochondria and chloroplasts, the modified version N-formylmethionine, fMet). However, some proteins are modified posttranslationally, for example, by cleavage from a protein precursor, and therefore may have different amino acids at their N-terminus.

== Function ==
=== N-terminal targeting signals ===
The N-terminus is the first part of the protein that exits the ribosome during protein biosynthesis. It often contains signal peptide sequences, "intracellular postal codes" that direct delivery of the protein to the proper organelle. The signal peptide is typically removed at the destination by a signal peptidase. The N-terminal amino acid of a protein is an important determinant of its half-life (likelihood of being degraded). This is called the N-end rule.

==== Signal peptide ====
The N-terminal signal peptide is recognized by the signal recognition particle (SRP) and results in the targeting of the protein to the secretory pathway. In eukaryotic cells, these proteins are synthesized at the rough endoplasmic reticulum. In prokaryotic cells, the proteins are exported across the cell membrane. In chloroplasts, signal peptides target proteins to the thylakoids.

==== Mitochondrial targeting peptide ====
The N-terminal mitochondrial targeting peptide (mtTP) allows the protein to be imported into the mitochondrion.

==== Chloroplast targeting peptide ====
The N-terminal chloroplast targeting peptide (cpTP) allows for the protein to be imported into the chloroplast.

== N-terminal modifications ==
Protein N-termini can be modified co - or post-translationally. Modifications include the removal of initiator methionine (iMet) by aminopeptidases, attachment of small chemical groups such as acetyl, propionyl and methyl, and the addition of membrane anchors, such as palmitoyl and myristoyl groups

=== N-terminal acetylation ===
N-terminal acetylation is a form of protein modification that can occur in both prokaryotes and eukaryotes. It has been suggested that N-terminal acetylation can prevent a protein from following a secretory pathway.

=== N-Myristoylation ===
The N-terminus can be modified by the addition of a myristoyl anchor. Proteins that are modified this way contain a consensus motif at their N-terminus as a modification signal.

=== N-Acylation ===
The N-terminus can also be modified by the addition of a fatty acid anchor to form N-acetylated proteins. The most common form of such modification is the addition of a palmitoyl group.

== See also ==
- C-terminus
- TopFIND, a scientific database covering proteases, their cleavage site specificity, substrates, inhibitors and protein termini originating from their activity
