= Protease =

Enzyme that cleaves other proteins into smaller peptides

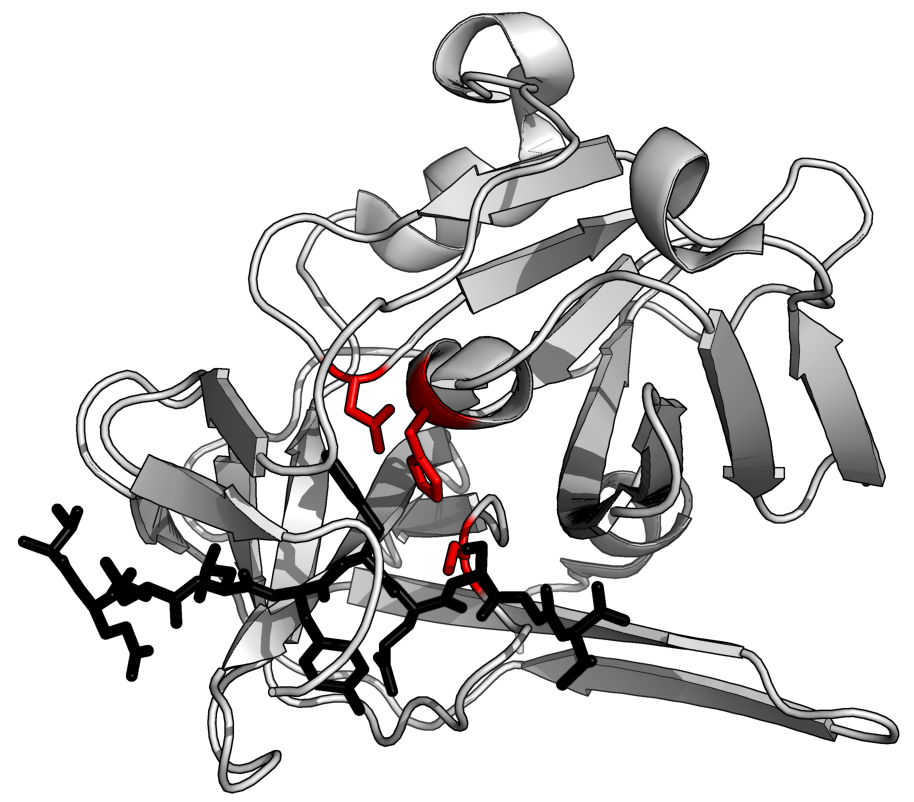
Ribbon diagram of a protease (TEV protease) complexed with its peptide substrate in black with catalytic residues in red (PDB: 1LVB)

A protease (also called a peptidase, proteinase, or proteolytic enzyme) is an enzyme that catalyzes proteolysis, breaking down proteins into smaller polypeptides or single amino acids, and spurring the formation of new protein products. They do this by cleaving the peptide bonds within proteins by hydrolysis, a reaction where water breaks bonds. Proteases are involved in numerous biological pathways, including digestion of ingested proteins, protein catabolism (breakdown of old proteins), and cell signaling.

In the absence of functional accelerants, proteolysis would be very slow, taking hundreds of years. Proteases can be found in all forms of life including viruses. They have independently evolved multiple times, and different classes of protease can perform the same reaction by completely different catalytic mechanisms.

== Classification ==
=== Based on catalytic residue ===
Proteases can be classified into seven broad groups:

- Serine proteases - using a serine alcohol
- Cysteine proteases - using a cysteine thiol
- Threonine proteases - using a threonine secondary alcohol
- Aspartic proteases - using an aspartate carboxylic acid
- Glutamic proteases - using a glutamate carboxylic acid
- Metalloproteases - using a metal, usually zinc
- Asparagine peptide lyases - using an asparagine to perform an elimination reaction (not requiring water)

Proteases were first grouped into 84 families according to their evolutionary relationship in 1993, and classified under four catalytic types: serine, cysteine, aspartic, and metallo proteases. The threonine and glutamic proteases were not described until 1995 and 2004 respectively. The mechanism used to cleave a peptide bond involves making an amino acid residue that has the cysteine and threonine (proteases) or a water molecule (aspartic, glutamic and metalloproteases) nucleophilic so that it can attack the peptide carbonyl group. One way to make a nucleophile is by a catalytic triad, where a histidine residue is used to activate serine, cysteine, or threonine as a nucleophile. This is not an evolutionary grouping, however, as the nucleophile types have evolved convergently in different superfamilies, and some superfamilies show divergent evolution to multiple different nucleophiles. Metalloproteases, aspartic, and glutamic proteases utilize their active site residues to activate a water molecule, which then attacks the scissile bond.

==== Peptide lyases ====
A seventh catalytic type of proteolytic enzymes, asparagine peptide lyase, was described in 2011. Its proteolytic mechanism is unusual since, rather than hydrolysis, it performs an elimination reaction. During this reaction, the catalytic asparagine forms a cyclic chemical structure that cleaves itself at asparagine residues in proteins under the right conditions. Given its fundamentally different mechanism, its inclusion as a peptidase may be debatable.

=== Based on evolutionary phylogeny ===
An up-to-date classification of protease evolutionary superfamilies is found in the MEROPS database. In this database, proteases are classified firstly by 'clan' (superfamily) based on structure, mechanism and catalytic residue order (e.g. the PA clan where P indicates a mixture of nucleophile families). Within each 'clan', proteases are classified into families based on sequence similarity (e.g. the S1 and C3 families within the PA clan). Each family may contain many hundreds of related proteases (e.g. trypsin, elastase, thrombin and streptogrisin within the S1 family).

Currently more than 50 clans are known, each indicating an independent evolutionary origin of proteolysis.

=== Based on optimal pH ===
Alternatively, proteases may be classified by the optimal pH in which they are active:

- Acid proteases
- Neutral proteases involved in type 1 hypersensitivity. Here, it is released by mast cells and causes activation of complement and kinins. This group includes the calpains.
- Basic proteases (or alkaline proteases)

== Enzymatic function and mechanism ==
A comparison of the two hydrolytic mechanisms used for proteolysis. Enzyme is shown in black, substrate protein in red and water in blue. The top panel shows 1-step hydrolysis where the enzyme uses an acid to polarise water, which then hydrolyses the substrate. The bottom panel shows 2-step hydrolysis where a residue within the enzyme is activated to act as a nucleophile (Nu) and attack the substrate. This forms an intermediate where the enzyme is covalently linked to the N-terminal half of the substrate. In a second step, water is activated to hydrolyse this intermediate and complete catalysis. Other enzyme residues (not shown) donate and accept hydrogens and electrostatically stabilise charge build-up along the reaction mechanism.

Proteases are involved in digesting long protein chains into shorter fragments by splitting the peptide bonds that link amino acid residues. Some detach the terminal amino acids from the protein chain (exopeptidases, such as aminopeptidases, carboxypeptidase A); others attack internal peptide bonds of a protein (endopeptidases, such as trypsin, chymotrypsin, pepsin, papain, elastase).

=== Catalysis ===
Catalysis is achieved by one of two mechanisms:

- Aspartic, glutamic, and metallo-proteases activate a water molecule, which performs a nucleophilic attack on the peptide bond to hydrolyze it.
- Serine, threonine, and cysteine proteases use a nucleophilic residue (usually in a catalytic triad). That residue performs a nucleophilic attack to covalently link the protease to the substrate protein, releasing the first half of the product. This covalent acyl-enzyme intermediate is then hydrolyzed by activated water to complete catalysis by releasing the second half of the product and regenerating the free enzyme

=== Specificity ===
Proteolysis can be highly promiscuous such that a wide range of protein substrates are hydrolyzed. This is the case for digestive enzymes such as trypsin, which have to be able to cleave the array of proteins ingested into smaller peptide fragments. Promiscuous proteases typically bind to a single amino acid on the substrate and so only have specificity for that residue. For example, trypsin is specific for the sequences ...K\... or ...R\... ('\'=cleavage site).

Conversely some proteases are highly specific and only cleave substrates with a certain sequence. Blood clotting (such as thrombin) and viral polyprotein processing (such as TEV protease) requires this level of specificity in order to achieve precise cleavage events. This is achieved by proteases having a long binding cleft or tunnel with several pockets that bind to specified residues. For example, TEV protease is specific for the sequence ...ENLYFQ\S... ('\'=cleavage site).

=== Degradation and autolysis ===
Proteases, being themselves proteins, are cleaved by other protease molecules, sometimes of the same variety. This acts as a method of regulation of protease activity. Some proteases are less active after autolysis (e.g. TEV protease) whilst others are more active (e.g. trypsinogen).

== Biodiversity of proteases ==
Proteases occur in all organisms, from prokaryotes to eukaryotes to viruses. These enzymes are involved in a multitude of physiological reactions from simple digestion of food proteins to highly regulated cascades (e.g., the blood-clotting cascade, the complement system, apoptosis pathways, and the invertebrate prophenoloxidase-activating cascade). Proteases can either break specific peptide bonds (limited proteolysis), depending on the amino acid sequence of a protein, or completely break down a peptide to amino acids (unlimited proteolysis). The activity can be a destructive change (abolishing a protein's function or digesting it to its principal components), it can be an activation of a function, or it can be a signal in a signalling pathway.

=== Plants ===
Plant genomes encode hundreds of proteases, largely of unknown function. Those with known function are largely involved in developmental regulation. Plant proteases also play a role in regulation of photosynthesis.

=== Animals ===
Proteases are used throughout an organism for various metabolic processes. Acid proteases secreted into the stomach (such as pepsin) and serine proteases present in the duodenum (trypsin and chymotrypsin) enable the digestion of protein in food. Proteases present in blood serum (thrombin, plasmin, Hageman factor, etc.) play an important role in blood-clotting, as well as lysis of the clots, and the correct action of the immune system. Other proteases are present in leukocytes (elastase, cathepsin G) and play several different roles in metabolic control. Some snake venoms are also proteases, such as pit viper haemotoxin, which interferes with the victim's blood clotting cascade. Proteases determine the lifetime of other proteins playing important physiological roles like hormones, antibodies, or other enzymes. This is one of the fastest "switching on" and "switching off" regulatory mechanisms in the physiology of an organism.

By a complex cooperative action, proteases can catalyze cascade reactions, which result in rapid and efficient amplification of an organism's response to a physiological signal.

=== Bacteria ===
Bacteria secrete proteases to hydrolyse the peptide bonds in proteins and therefore break the proteins down into their constituent amino acids. Bacterial and fungal proteases are particularly important to the global carbon and nitrogen cycles in the recycling of proteins, and such activity tends to be regulated by nutritional signals in these organisms. The net impact of nutritional regulation of protease activity among the thousands of species present in soil can be observed at the overall microbial community level as proteins are broken down in response to carbon, nitrogen, or sulfur limitation.

Bacteria contain proteases responsible for general protein quality control (e.g. the AAA+ proteasome) by degrading unfolded or misfolded proteins.

A secreted bacterial protease may also act as an exotoxin, and be an example of a virulence factor in bacterial pathogenesis (for example, exfoliative toxin). Bacterial exotoxic proteases destroy extracellular structures.

=== Viruses ===
The genomes of some viruses encode one massive polyprotein, which needs a protease to cleave this into functional units (e.g. the hepatitis C virus and the picornaviruses). These proteases (e.g. TEV protease) have high specificity and only cleave a very restricted set of substrate sequences. They are therefore a common target for protease inhibitors.

=== Archaea ===
Archaea use proteases to regulate various cellular processes from cell-signaling, metabolism, secretion and protein quality control. Only two ATP-dependent proteases are found in archaea: the membrane associated LonB protease and a soluble 20S proteosome complex.

=== Tumours ===
Proteases are associated with cancer progression due to their ability to degrade extracellular matrices, which facilitates invasion and metastasis; these enzymes target a diversity of substrates and favour all steps of tumour production; some proteases have tumour-suppressive effects, associated with more than 30 different enzymes that belong to three distinct protease classes.

== Uses ==
The field of protease research is enormous. Since 2004, approximately 8000 papers related to this field were published each year. Proteases are used in industry, medicine and as a basic biological research tool.

Digestive proteases are part of many laundry detergents and are also used extensively in the bread industry in bread improver. A variety of proteases are used medically both for their native function (e.g. controlling blood clotting) or for completely artificial functions (e.g. for the targeted degradation of pathogenic proteins). Highly specific proteases such as TEV protease and thrombin are commonly used to cleave fusion proteins and affinity tags in a controlled fashion. Protease-containing plant-solutions called vegetarian rennet have been in use for hundreds of years in Europe and the Middle East for making kosher and halal cheeses. Vegetarian rennet from Withania coagulans has been in use for thousands of years as a Ayurvedic remedy for digestion and diabetes in the Indian subcontinent. It is also used to make Paneer.

== Inhibitors ==
The activity of proteases is inhibited by protease inhibitors. One example of protease inhibitors is the serpin superfamily. It includes alpha 1-antitrypsin (which protects the body from excessive effects of its own inflammatory proteases), alpha 1-antichymotrypsin (which does likewise), C1-inhibitor (which protects the body from excessive protease-triggered activation of its own complement system), antithrombin (which protects the body from excessive coagulation), plasminogen activator inhibitor-1 (which protects the body from inadequate coagulation by blocking protease-triggered fibrinolysis), and neuroserpin.

Natural protease inhibitors include the family of lipocalin proteins, which play a role in cell regulation and differentiation. Lipophilic ligands, attached to lipocalin proteins, have been found to possess tumor protease inhibiting properties. The natural protease inhibitors are not to be confused with the protease inhibitors used in antiretroviral therapy. Some viruses, with HIV/AIDS among them, depend on proteases in their reproductive cycle. Thus, protease inhibitors are developed as antiviral therapeutic agents.

Other natural protease inhibitors are used as defense mechanisms. Common examples are the trypsin inhibitors found in the seeds of some plants, most notable for humans being soybeans, a major food crop, where they act to discourage predators. Raw soybeans are toxic to many animals, including humans, until the protease inhibitors they contain have been denatured.

== See also ==
- Ligase
- Protease
  - cysteine-
  - serine-
  - threonine-
  - aspartic-
  - glutamic-
  - metallo-
  - Phytaspase
- PA clan
- Convergent evolution
- Proteolysis
- Catalytic triad
- The Proteolysis Map
- Proteases in angiogenesis
- Intramembrane proteases
- Protease inhibitor (pharmacology)
- Protease inhibitor (biology)
- TopFIND - database of protease specificity, substrates, products and inhibitors
- MEROPS - Database of protease evolutionary groups
