= Chymotrypsin =

Digestive enzyme

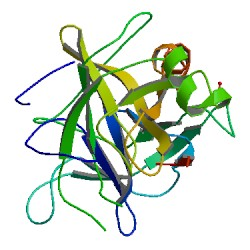
- Crystallographic structure of Bos taurus chymotrypsinogen

Identifiers
- EC no.: 3.4.21.1
- CAS no.: 9004-07-3

Databases
- BRENDA: enzyme data
- ExPASy: NiceZyme view
- KEGG: enzyme entry
- MetaCyc: metabolic pathway
- Rhea: reactions
- PDB structures: RCSB PDB PDBe PDBsum
- Gene Ontology: AmiGO / QuickGO
Search
- PMC: articles
- PubMed: articles
- NCBI: proteins

Chymotrypsin C

Identifiers
- EC no.: 3.4.21.2
- CAS no.: 9036-09-3

Databases
- BRENDA: enzyme data
- ExPASy: NiceZyme view
- KEGG: enzyme entry
- MetaCyc: metabolic pathway
- Rhea: reactions
- PDB structures: RCSB PDB PDBe PDBsum
Search
- PMC: articles
- PubMed: articles
- NCBI: proteins

Chymotrypsins (EC 3.4.21.1, including enzymes called alpha-chymotrypsin, chymotrypsin A, and chymotrypsin B) are digestive enzymes that form a component of pancreatic juice acting in the duodenum, where they perform proteolysis, the breakdown of proteins and polypeptides. In humans, the corresponding enzymes are encoded by the genes CTRB1 and CTRB2. The related enzyme chymotrypsin-C (EC 3.4.21.2) acts similarly, but with some differences including a preference for cutting leucine over phenylalanine bonds.

Chymotrypsin preferentially cleaves peptide amide bonds where the side chain of the amino acid N-terminal to the scissile amide bond (the P_{1} position) is a large hydrophobic amino acid (tyrosine, tryptophan, and phenylalanine). These amino acids contain an aromatic ring in their side chain that fits into a hydrophobic pocket (the S_{1} position) of the enzyme. It is activated in the presence of trypsin. The hydrophobic and shape complementarity between the peptide substrate P_{1} side chain and the enzyme S_{1} binding cavity accounts for the substrate specificity of this enzyme. Chymotrypsin also hydrolyzes other amide bonds in peptides at slower rates, particularly those containing leucine at the P_{1} position.

Structurally, it is the archetypal structure for its superfamily, the PA clan of proteases.

== Other names ==
This enzyme has been called various other names including alpha-chymar ophth, avazyme, chymar, chymotest, enzeon, quimar, quimotrase, alpha-chymar, and alpha-chymotrypsin A.

== Activation ==
Chymotrypsin is synthesized in the pancreas. Its precursor is chymotrypsinogen. Trypsin activates chymotrypsinogen by cleaving peptidic bonds in positions Arg15 – Ile16 and produces π-chymotrypsin. In turn, aminic group (-NH_{3}^{+}) of the Ile16 residue interacts with the side chain of Asp194, producing the "oxyanion hole" and the hydrophobic "S1 pocket". Moreover, chymotrypsin induces its own activation by cleaving in positions 14–15, 146–147, and 148–149, producing α-chymotrypsin (which is more active and stable than π-chymotrypsin). The resulting molecule is a three-polypeptide molecule interconnected via disulfide bonds.

== Mechanism of action and kinetics ==
Molecular mechanism of chymotrypsin-catalyzed hydrolysis of peptide bond. One key aspect is the tetrahedral intermediate Tet 1.

In vivo, chymotrypsin is a proteolytic enzyme (serine protease) acting in the digestive systems of many organisms. It facilitates the cleavage of peptide bonds by a hydrolysis reaction, which despite being thermodynamically favorable, occurs extremely slowly in the absence of a catalyst. The main substrates of chymotrypsin are peptide bonds in which the amino acid N-terminal to the bond is a tryptophan, tyrosine, phenylalanine, or leucine. Like many proteases, chymotrypsin also hydrolyses amide bonds in vitro, a virtue that enabled the use of substrate analogs such as N-acetyl-L-phenylalanine p-nitrophenyl amide for enzyme assays.

Chymotrypsin cleaves peptide bonds by attacking the unreactive carbonyl group with a powerful nucleophile, the serine 195 residue located in the active site of the enzyme, which briefly becomes covalently bonded to the substrate, forming an enzyme-substrate intermediate. Along with histidine 57 and aspartic acid 102, this serine residue constitutes the catalytic triad of the active site. These findings rely on inhibition assays and the study of the kinetics of cleavage of the aforementioned substrate, exploiting the fact that the enzyme-substrate intermediate p-nitrophenolate has a yellow colour, enabling measurement of its concentration by measuring light absorbance at 410 nm.

Chymotrypsin catalysis of the hydrolysis of a protein substrate (in red) is performed in two steps. First, the nucleophilicity of Ser-195 is enhanced by general-base catalysis in which the proton of the serine hydroxyl group is transferred to the imidazole moiety of His-57 during its attack on the electron-deficient carbonyl carbon of the protein-substrate main chain (k1 step). This occurs via the concerted action of the three-amino-acid residues in the catalytic triad. The buildup of negative charge on the resultant tetrahedral intermediate is stabilized in the enzyme's active site's oxyanion hole, by formation of two hydrogen bonds to adjacent main-chain amide-hydrogens.

The His-57 imidazolium moiety formed in the k1 step is a general acid catalyst for the k-1 reaction. However, evidence for similar general-acid catalysis of the k2 reaction (Tet2) has been controverted; apparently water provides a proton to the amine leaving group.

Breakdown of Tet1 (via k3) generates an acyl enzyme, which is hydrolyzed with His-57 acting as a general base (kH2O) in formation of a tetrahedral intermediate, that breaks down to regenerate the serine hydroxyl moiety, as well as the protein fragment with the newly formed carboxyl terminus.

== Medical uses ==
Chymotrypsin has been used during cataract surgery. It was marketed under the brand name Zolyse.

== Isozymes ==
Chymotrypsinogen B1

Identifiers
- Symbol: CTRB1
- NCBI gene: 1504
- HGNC: 2521
- OMIM: 118890
- RefSeq: NM_001906
- UniProt: P17538

Other data
- EC number: 3.4.21.1
- Locus: Chr. 16 q23.1
Search for
- Structures: Swiss-model
- Domains: InterPro

Chymotrypsinogen B2

Identifiers
- Symbol: CTRB2
- NCBI gene: 440387
- HGNC: 2522
- RefSeq: NM_001025200
- UniProt: Q6GPI1

Other data
- EC number: 3.4.21.1
- Locus: Chr. 16 q22.3
Search for
- Structures: Swiss-model
- Domains: InterPro

Chymotrypsin C (caldecrin)

Identifiers
- Symbol: CTRC
- NCBI gene: 11330
- HGNC: 2523
- OMIM: 601405
- RefSeq: NM_007272
- UniProt: Q99895

Other data
- EC number: 3.4.21.2
- Locus: Chr. 1 p36.21
Search for
- Structures: Swiss-model
- Domains: InterPro

== See also ==
- Trypsin
- PA clan of proteases
