= Esophageal cancer =

Malignant neoplastic disease of the esophagus

- Other names: Oesophageal cancer
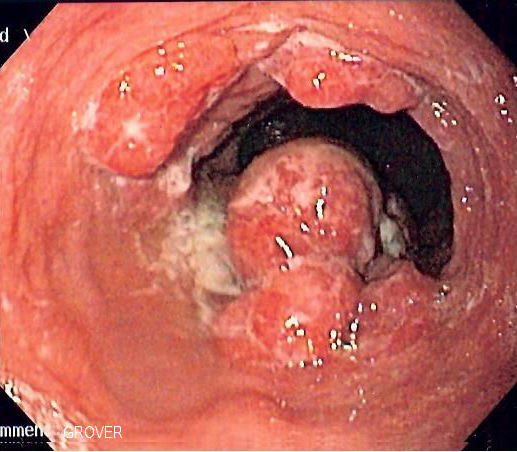
- Endoscopic image of an esophageal adenocarcinoma
- Specialty: Gastroenterology General surgery oncology
- Symptoms: Difficulty swallowing, weight loss, hoarse voice, enlarged lymph nodes around the collarbone, vomiting blood, blood in the stool
- Types: Esophageal squamous-cell carcinoma, esophageal adenocarcinoma
- Risk factors: Smoking tobacco, alcohol, very hot drinks, betel nut chewing, obesity, acid reflux
- Diagnostic method: Tissue biopsy
- Treatment: Surgery, chemotherapy, radiation therapy
- Prognosis: Five-year survival rates ~22% (US, 2022)
- Frequency: 746,000 affected as of 2015
- Deaths: 509,000 (2018)

Esophageal cancer (American English) or oesophageal cancer (British English) is cancer arising from the esophagus—the food pipe that runs between the throat and the stomach. Symptoms often include difficulty in swallowing and weight loss. Other symptoms may include pain when swallowing, a hoarse voice, enlarged lymph nodes ("glands") around the collarbone, a dry cough, and possibly coughing up or vomiting blood.

The two main sub-types of the disease are esophageal squamous-cell carcinoma (often abbreviated to ESCC), which is more common in the developing world, and esophageal adenocarcinoma (EAC), which is more common in the developed world. In developing nations, 85% of esophageal cancers are the squamous cell type. A number of less common types also occur. Squamous-cell carcinoma arises from the epithelial cells that line the esophagus. Adenocarcinoma arises from glandular cells present in the lower third of the esophagus, often where they have already transformed to intestinal cell type (a condition known as Barrett's esophagus).

Causes of the squamous-cell type include tobacco, alcohol, very hot drinks, poor diet, and chewing betel nut. The most common causes of the adenocarcinoma type are smoking tobacco, obesity, and acid reflux. In addition, for patients with achalasia, candidiasis (overgrowth of the esophagus with the fungus candida) is the most important risk factor.

The disease is diagnosed by biopsy done by an endoscope (a fiberoptic camera). Prevention includes stopping smoking and eating a healthy diet. Treatment is based on the cancer's stage and location, together with the person's general condition and individual preferences. Small localized squamous-cell cancers may be treated with surgery alone with the hope of a cure. In most other cases, chemotherapy with or without radiation therapy is used along with surgery. Larger tumors may have their growth slowed with chemotherapy and radiation therapy. In the presence of extensive disease or if the affected person is not fit enough to undergo surgery, palliative care is often recommended.

As of 2018, esophageal cancer was the eighth-most common cancer globally with 572,000 new cases during the year. It caused about 509,000 deaths that year, up from 345,000 in 1990. Rates vary widely among countries, with about half of all cases occurring in China. Esophageal adenocarcinoma is six times more likely to occur in men compared to women, and esophageal squamous cell carcinoma is twice as likely to occur in men. Outcomes are related to the extent of the disease and other medical conditions, but generally tend to be fairly poor, as diagnosis is often late. Five-year survival rates in the United States are around 22% (2016–2022).

== Signs and symptoms ==
Prominent symptoms usually do not appear until the cancer has infiltrated over 60% of the circumference of the esophageal tube, by which time the tumor is already in an advanced stage. Onset of symptoms is usually caused by narrowing of the tube due to the physical presence of the tumor.

The first and the most common symptom is usually difficulty in swallowing, which is often experienced first with solid foods and later with softer foods and liquids. Pain when swallowing is less usual at first. Weight loss is often an initial sign in cases of squamous-cell carcinoma, though not usually in cases of adenocarcinoma. Eventual weight loss due to reduced appetite and undernutrition is common. Pain behind the breastbone or in the region around the stomach often feels like heartburn. The pain can frequently be severe, worsening when food of any sort is swallowed. Another sign may be an unusually husky, raspy, or hoarse-sounding cough, a result of the tumor affecting the recurrent laryngeal nerve.

The presence of the tumor may disrupt the normal contractions of the esophagus when swallowing. This can lead to nausea and vomiting, regurgitation of food and coughing. There is also an increased risk of aspiration pneumonia due to food entering the airways through the abnormal connections (fistulas) that may develop between the esophagus and the trachea (windpipe). Early signs of this serious complication may be coughing on drinking or eating. The tumor surface may be fragile and bleed, causing vomiting of blood. Compression of local structures occurs in advanced disease, leading to such problems as upper airway obstruction and superior vena cava syndrome. Hypercalcemia (excess calcium in the blood) may occur.

If the cancer has spread elsewhere, symptoms related to metastatic disease may appear. Common sites of spread include nearby lymph nodes, the liver, lungs and bone. Liver metastasis can cause jaundice and abdominal swelling (ascites). Lung metastasis can cause, among other symptoms, impaired breathing due to excess fluid around the lungs (pleural effusion), and dyspnea (the feelings often associated with impaired breathing).

== Causes ==
The two main types of esophageal cancer (squamous-cell carcinoma and adenocarcinoma) have distinct sets of risk factors. Squamous-cell carcinoma is linked to lifestyle factors such as smoking and alcohol. Adenocarcinoma has been linked to effects of long-term acid reflux (especially acid reflux that causes erosions of the esophageal lining) and obesity. Tobacco is a risk factor for both types. Both types are more common in people over 60 years of age.

=== Squamous-cell carcinoma ===
The two major risk factors for esophageal squamous-cell carcinoma are consumption of alcoholic beverages, and using tobacco (smoking or chewing). The combination of tobacco and alcohol has a strong synergistic effect, which raises risks compared to either substance alone. Some data suggest that about half of all cases are due to tobacco and about one-third to alcohol, while over three-quarters of the cases in men are due to the combination of smoking and heavy drinking. Risks associated with alcohol appear to be linked to its aldehyde metabolite and to mutations in certain related enzymes. Such metabolic variants are relatively common in Asia.

Other relevant risk factors include regular consumption of very hot drinks (over 65 °C or 149 °F) and ingestion of caustic substances. High levels of dietary exposure to nitrosamines (chemical compounds found both in tobacco smoke and certain foodstuffs) also appear to be a relevant risk factor. Unfavorable dietary patterns seem to involve exposure to nitrosamines through processed and barbecued meats, pickled vegetables, etc., and a low intake of fresh foods. Other associated factors include nutritional deficiencies, low socioeconomic status, and poor oral hygiene. Chewing betel nut (areca) is an important risk factor in Asia.

Physical trauma may increase the risk. This may include the drinking of very hot drinks.

A large UK study of 977,282 adults found that drinking beverages very hot was associated with a substantially higher risk of oesophageal squamous cell carcinoma. Drinking six or more hot drinks daily was also associated with increased squamous cell carcinoma risk.

=== Adenocarcinoma ===
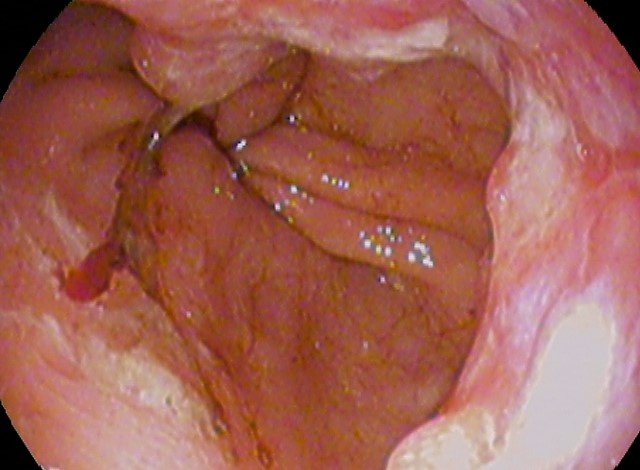
Esophageal cancer (lower part) as a result of Barrettʼs esophagus

Male predominance is particularly strong in esophageal adenocarcinoma, occurring about 7 to 10 times more frequently in men. This imbalance may be related to the characteristics and interactions of other known risk factors, including acid reflux and obesity.

==== Gastroesophageal reflux disease ====
The long-term erosive effects of acid reflux (an extremely common condition, also known as gastroesophageal reflux disease or GERD) have been strongly linked to this type of cancer. Longstanding GERD can induce a change of cell type in the lower portion of the esophagus in response to erosion of its squamous lining. This phenomenon, known as Barrett's esophagus, seems to appear about 20 years later in women than in men, possibly due to hormonal factors.

At a mechanistic level, in the esophagus there is a small HOXA13 expressing compartment that is more resistant to bile and acids as the normal squamous epithelium and that is prone to both intestinal differentiation as well as oncogenic transformation. Following GERD this HOXA13-expressing compartment outcompetes the normal squamous compartment, leading to the intestinal aspect of the esophagus and increased propensity to the development of esophageal cancer.

Having symptomatic GERD or bile reflux makes Barrett's esophagus more likely, which in turn raises the risk of further changes that can ultimately lead to adenocarcinoma. Bile reflux containing unconjugated bile acids, including deoxycholic acid and chenodeoxycholic acid, appears to contribute to esophageal adenocarcinoma carcinogenesis by inducing oxidative stress and DNA damage.

==== Obesity ====
Being obese or overweight is strongly associated with risk of developing esophageal adenocarcinoma, and may in fact be the strongest of any type of obesity-related cancer, though the reasons for this remain unclear. Abdominal obesity seems to be of particular relevance, given the closeness of its association with this type of cancer, as well as with both GERD and Barrett's esophagus. This type of obesity is characteristic of men. Physiologically, it stimulates GERD and also has other chronic inflammatory effects.

==== Helicobacter pylori ====
Helicobacter pylori infection (a common occurrence thought to have affected over half of the world's population) is not a risk factor for esophageal adenocarcinoma and actually appears to be protective. Despite being a cause of GERD and a risk factor for gastric cancer, the infection seems to be associated with a reduced risk of esophageal adenocarcinoma of as much as 50%. The biological explanation for a protective effect is unclear. One explanation is that some strains of H. pylori reduce stomach acid, thereby reducing damage by GERD. Decreasing rates of H. pylori infection in Western populations over recent decades, which have been linked to less overcrowding in households, could be a factor in the concurrent increase in esophageal adenocarcinoma.

==== Sex hormone risk factors for esophageal adenocarcinoma ====
Sex specific hormones may explain some of the gender specific differences in the risk of esophageal adenocarcinoma, but the effects of sex hormones are not fully understood. Female hormones may have a protective effect, as EAC is not only much less common in women but develops later in life, by an average of 20 years. Esophageal adenocarcinoma risk seems to decline for the mothers who breast fed their infants longer than 12 months (a 60% lower risk of esophageal adenocarcinoma) and older women receiving postmenopausal hormone therapy. Men who receive 5α-Reductase inhibitor therapy for enlarged prostate also have a lower risk of esophageal adenocarcinoma. 5α-Reductase inhibitors have anti-androgenic effects by blocking the conversion of testosterone to the more potent dihydrotestosterone.

=== Related conditions ===
- Head and neck cancer is associated with second primary tumors in the region, including esophageal squamous-cell carcinomas, due to field cancerization (i.e. a regional reaction to long-term carcinogenic exposure).
- History of radiation therapy for other conditions in the chest is a risk factor for esophageal adenocarcinoma.
- Corrosive injury to the esophagus by accidentally or intentionally swallowing caustic substances is a risk factor for squamous cell carcinoma.
- Tylosis with esophageal cancer is a rare familial disease with autosomal dominant inheritance that has been linked to a mutation in the RHBDF2 gene, present on chromosome 17: it involves thickening of the skin of the palms and soles and a high lifetime risk of squamous cell carcinoma.
- Achalasia (i.e. lack of the involuntary reflex in the esophagus after swallowing) appears to be a risk factor for both main types of esophageal cancer, at least in men, due to stagnation of trapped food and drink.
- Plummer–Vinson syndrome (a rare disease that involves esophageal webs) is also a risk factor.
- There is some evidence suggesting a possible causal association between human papillomavirus (HPV) and esophageal squamous-cell carcinoma. The relationship is unclear. Possible relevance of HPV could be greater in places that have a particularly high incidence of this form of the disease, as in some Asian countries, including China.
- There is an association between celiac disease and esophageal cancer. People with untreated celiac disease have a higher risk, but this risk decreases with time after diagnosis, probably due to the adoption of a gluten-free diet, which seems to have a protective role against development of malignancy in people with celiac disease. However, the delay in diagnosis and initiation of a gluten-free diet seems to increase the risk of malignancy. Moreover, in some cases the detection of celiac disease is due to the development of cancer, whose early symptoms are similar to some that may appear in celiac disease.

== Diagnosis ==
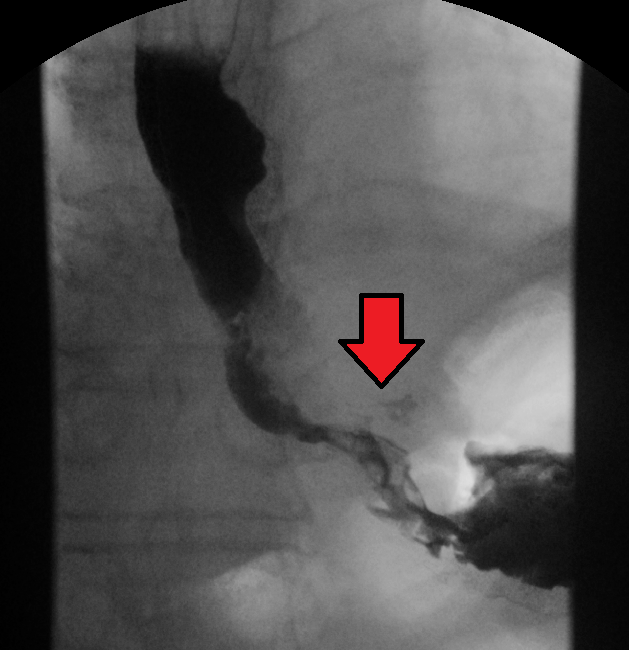
Esophageal cancer as shown by a filling defect during an upper GI series

=== Clinical evaluation ===
Although an occlusive tumor may be suspected on a barium swallow, the diagnosis is made with a visual examination using an endoscope with tissue sampling (biopsy). This involves passing a flexible tube with a light and camera down the esophagus and examining the lining, and is called an esophagogastroduodenoscopy. Biopsies taken of suspicious lesions are then examined histologically for signs of malignancy.

Additional testing is needed to assess how much the cancer has spread (see § Staging, below). Computed tomography (CT) of the chest, abdomen and pelvis can evaluate whether the cancer has spread to adjacent tissues or distant organs (especially liver and lymph nodes). The sensitivity of a CT scan is limited by its ability to detect masses (e.g. enlarged lymph nodes or involved organs) generally larger than 1 cm. Positron emission tomography (PET scan) is also used to estimate the extent of the disease and is regarded as more precise than CT alone. Esophageal endoscopic ultrasound can provide staging information regarding the level of local tumor invasion, and possible spread to regional lymph nodes.

Endoscopic image of Barrett esophagus – a frequent precursor of esophageal adenocarcinoma

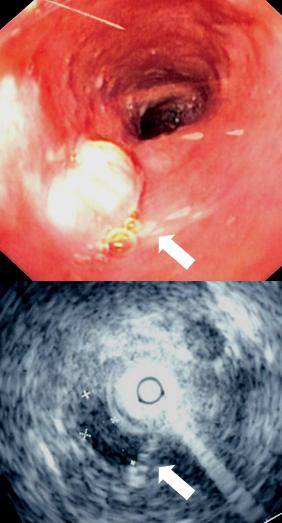
Endoscopy and radial endoscopic ultrasound images of a submucosal tumor in the central portion of the esophagus

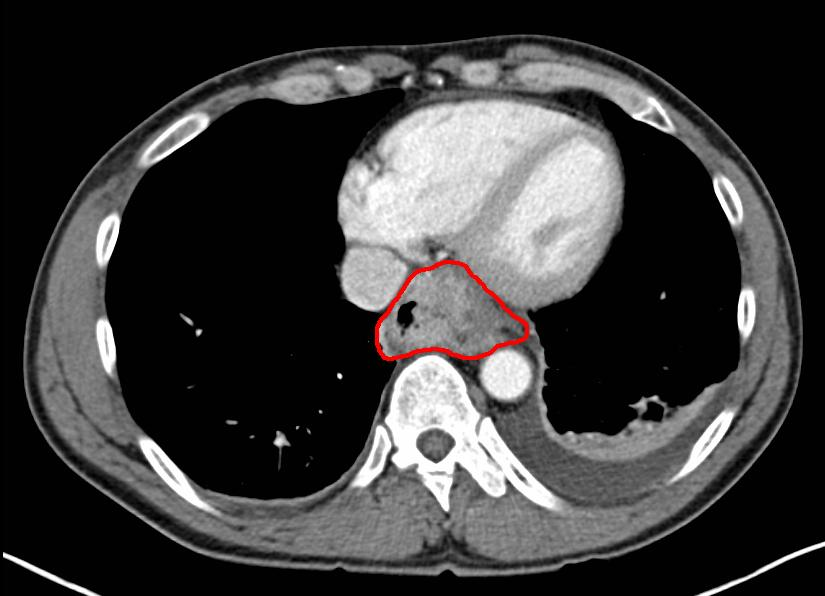
Contrast CT scan showing an esophageal tumor (axial view)

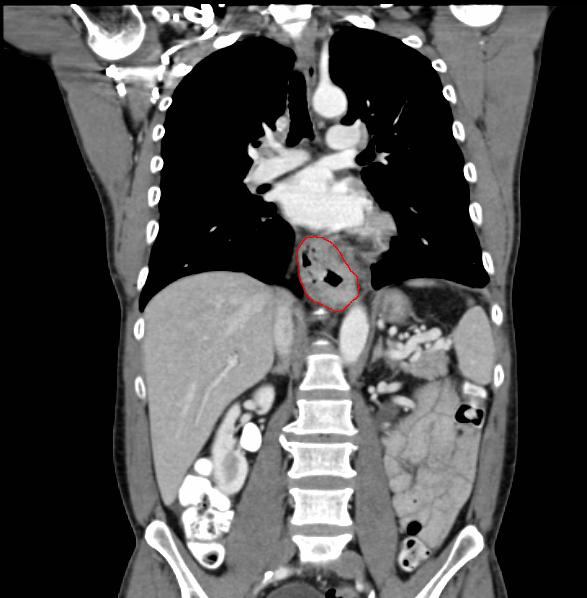
Contrast CT scan showing an esophageal tumor (coronal view)

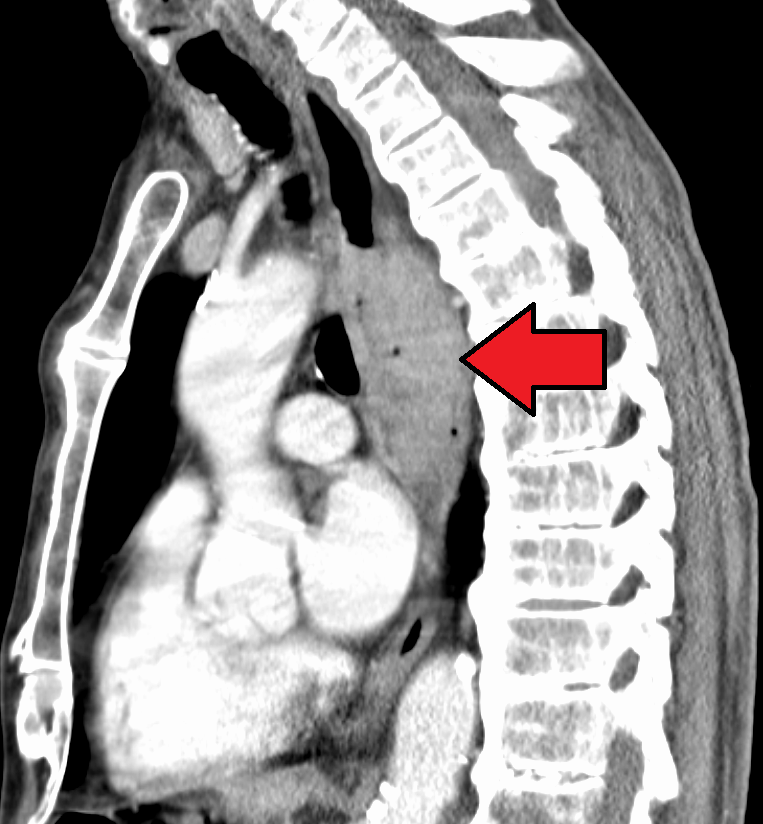
Esophageal cancer

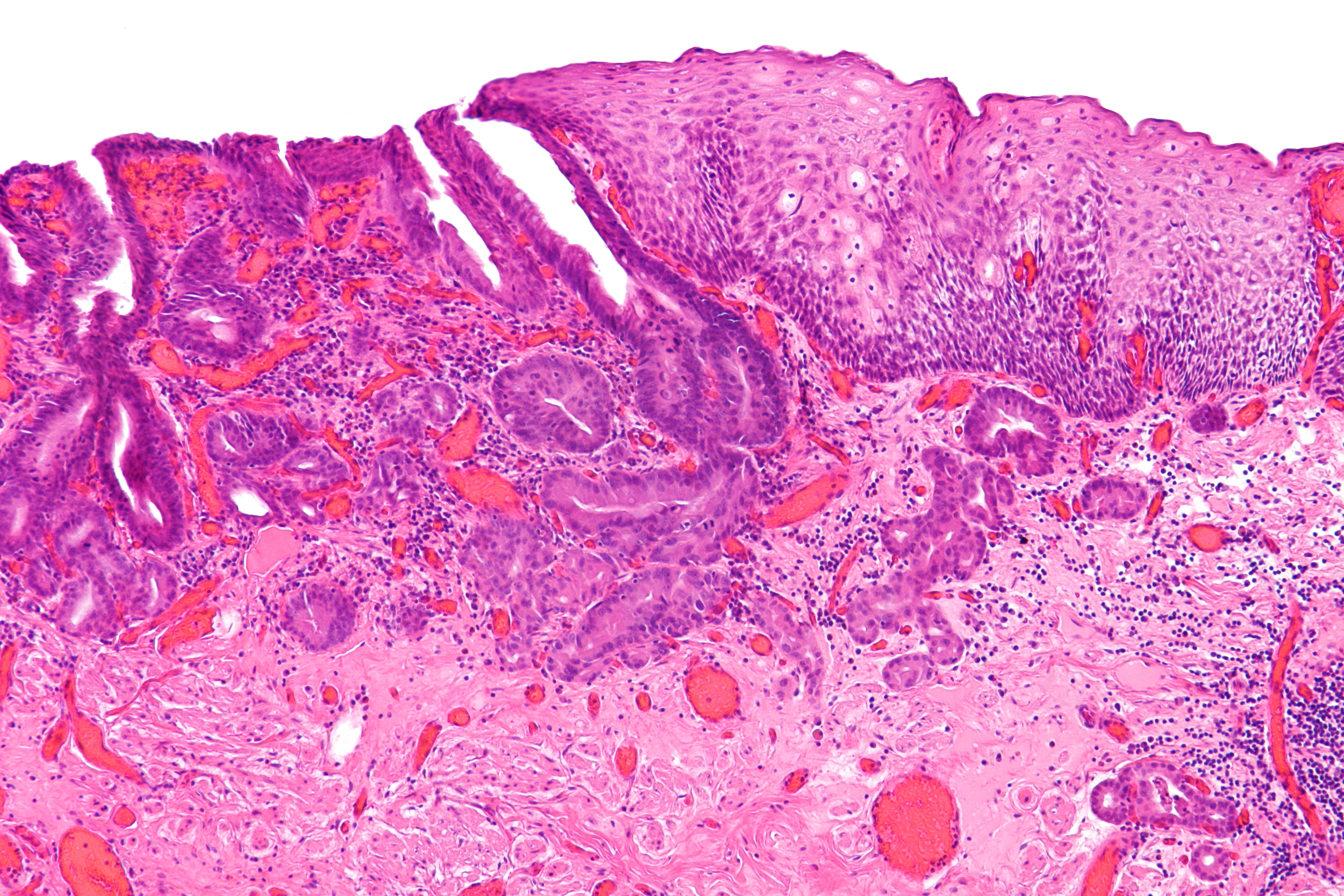
Micrograph showing histopathological appearance of an esophageal adenocarcinoma (dark blue – upper-left of image) and normal squamous epithelium (upper-right of image) at H&E staining

=== Types ===
Esophageal cancers are typically carcinomas that arise from the epithelium, or surface lining, of the esophagus. Esophageal squamous-cell carcinomas and esophageal adenocarcinomas are by far the two most common types of esophageal cancer.

Rare histologic types of esophageal cancer include different variants of squamous-cell carcinoma, and non-epithelial tumors, such as leiomyosarcoma, melanoma, rhabdomyosarcoma and lymphoma, among others.

=== Staging ===
Staging is based on the TNM staging system, which classifies the amount of tumor invasion (T), involvement of lymph nodes (N), and distant metastasis (M). The currently preferred classification is the 2010 AJCC staging system for cancer of the esophagus and the esophagogastric junction. To help guide clinical decision making, this system also incorporates information on cell type (ESCC, EAC, etc.), grade (degree of differentiation – an indication of the biological aggressiveness of the cancer cells), and tumor location (upper, middle, lower, or junctional).

T1, T2, and T3 stages of esophageal cancer

Stage T4 esophageal cancer

Esophageal cancer with spread to lymph nodes

== Prevention ==
Prevention includes stopping smoking or chewing tobacco. Overcoming addiction to areca chewing in Asia is another promising strategy for the prevention of esophageal squamous-cell carcinoma. The risk can also be reduced by maintaining a normal body weight. And in those who are overweight or obese, weight loss is thought to reduce the risk of esophageal cancer. According to a 2022 umbrella review, calcium intake could be associated with lower risk.

According to the National Cancer Institute, "diets high in cruciferous (cabbage, broccoli/broccolini, cauliflower, Brussels sprouts) and green and yellow vegetables and fruits are associated with a decreased risk of esophageal cancer." Dietary fiber is thought to be protective, especially against esophageal adenocarcinoma. There is no evidence that vitamin supplements change the risk.

Regular use of acid blockers (such as proton-pump inhibitors and H2 blockers) in the general population has not been shown to prevent esophageal cancer.

=== Screening ===
People with Barrett's esophagus (an abnormality of the cells lining the lower esophagus) are at much higher risk of esophageal adenocarcinoma, and may receive regular endoscopic screening for the early signs of cancer. In those with Barrett's esophagus, removal of portions of the esophageal lining showing high levels of atypical cells on biopsy may prevent the progression to overt cancer. In those undergoing endoscopy, use of Lugol's iodine to detect atypical cells and remove that portion of the esophageal lining has been shown to reduce the risk of esophageal squamous cell cancer in some trials. Because the benefit of screening for esophageal cancer in people without symptoms is unclear, it is not recommended in the United States.

Several risk factor based clinical scoring tools have been proposed to use targeted screening for those at high risk, but these scoring systems have not been clinically validated.

== Management ==
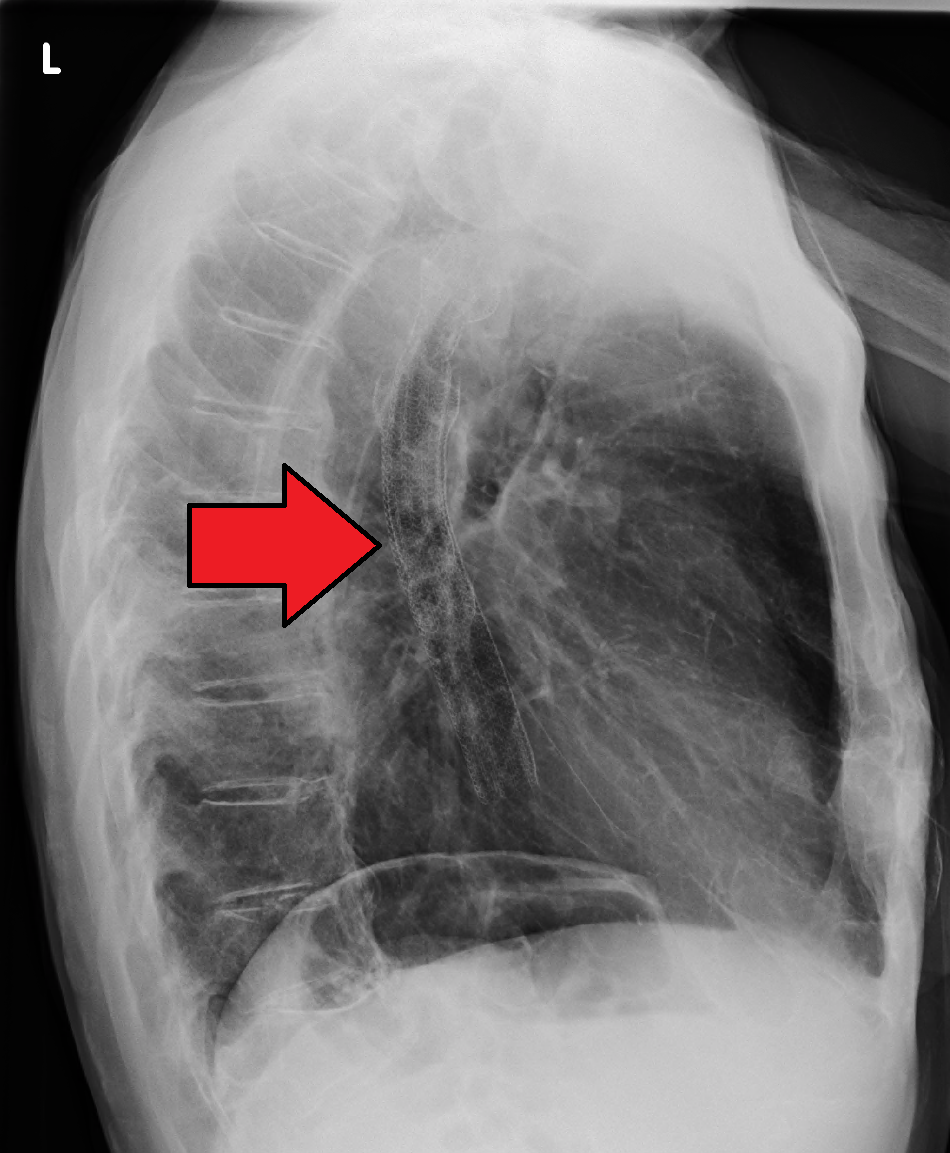
Esophageal stent for esophageal cancer

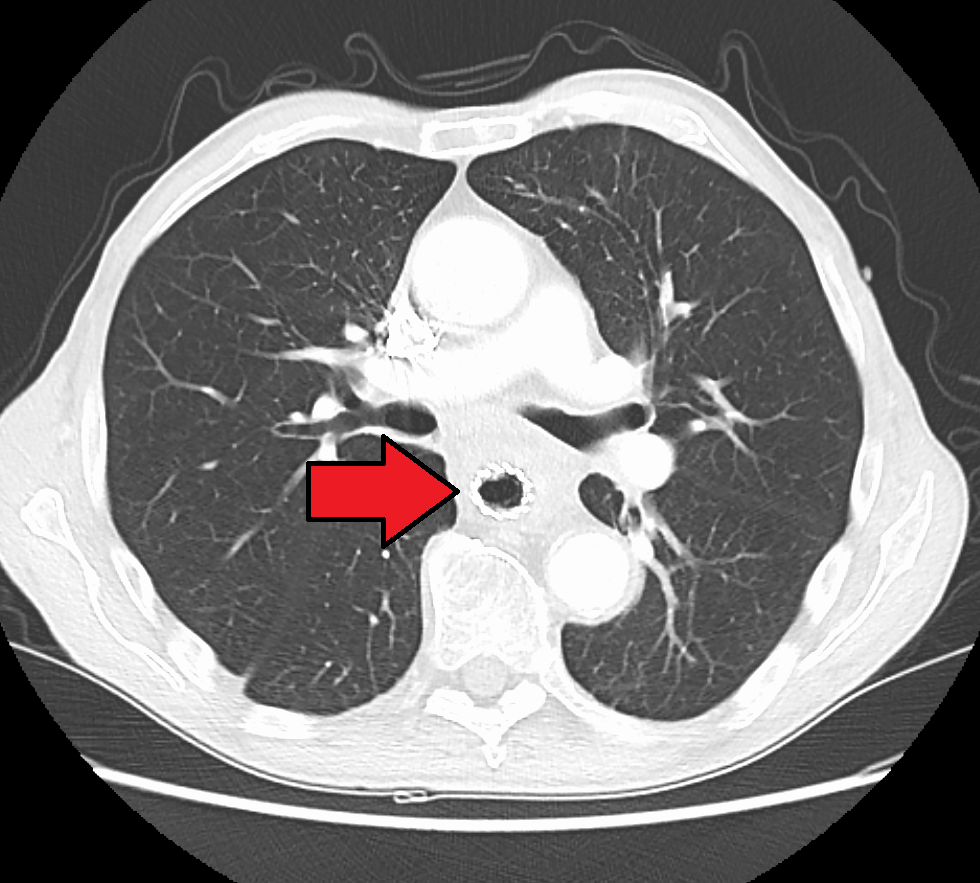
Esophageal stent for esophageal cancer

Before and after a total esophagectomy

Typical scar lines after the two main methods of surgery

Treatment is best managed by a multidisciplinary team covering the various specialties involved. Adequate nutrition must be assured, and appropriate dental care is essential. Factors that influence treatment decisions include the stage and cellular type of cancer (EAC, ESCC, and other types), along with the person's general condition and any other diseases that are present.

In general, treatment with a curative intention is restricted to localized disease, without distant metastasis: in such cases a combined approach that includes surgery may be considered. Disease that is widespread, metastatic or recurrent is managed palliatively: in this case, chemotherapy may be used to lengthen survival, while treatments such as radiotherapy or stenting may be used to relieve symptoms and make it easier to swallow.

=== Surgery ===
If the cancer has been diagnosed while still in an early stage, surgical treatment with a curative intention may be possible. Some small tumors that only involve the mucosa or lining of the esophagus may be removed by endoscopic mucosal resection (EMR). Otherwise, curative surgery of early-stage lesions may entail removal of all or part of the esophagus (esophagectomy), although this is a difficult operation with a relatively high risk of mortality or post-operative difficulties. The benefits of surgery are less clear in early-stage ESCC than EAC. There are a number of surgical options, and the best choices for particular situations remain the subject of research and discussion.

The likely quality of life after treatment is a relevant factor when considering surgery. Surgical outcomes are likely better in large centers where the procedures are frequently performed. If the cancer has spread to other parts of the body, esophagectomy is nowadays not normally performed.

Esophagectomy is the removal of a segment of the esophagus; as this shortens the length of the remaining esophagus, some other segment of the digestive tract is pulled up through the chest cavity and interposed. This is usually the stomach or part of the large intestine (colon) or jejunum. Reconnection of the stomach to a shortened esophagus is called an esophagogastric anastomosis.

Esophagectomy can be performed using several methods. The choice of the surgical approach depends on the characteristics and location of the tumor, and the preference of the surgeon. Clear evidence from clinical trials for which approaches give the best outcomes in different circumstances is lacking. A first decision, regarding the point of entry, is between a transhiatal and a transthoracic procedure. The more recent transhiatal approach avoids the need to open the chest; instead the surgeon enters the body through an incision in the lower abdomen and another in the neck. The lower part of the esophagus is freed from the surrounding tissues and cut away as necessary. The stomach is then pushed through the esophageal hiatus (the hole where the esophagus passes through the diaphragm) and is joined to the remaining upper part of the esophagus at the neck.

The traditional transthoracic approach enters the body through the chest, and has a number of variations. The thoracoabdominal approach opens the abdominal and thoracic cavities together, the two-stage Ivor Lewis (also called Lewis–Tanner) approach involves an initial laparotomy and construction of a gastric tube, followed by a right thoracotomy to excise the tumor and create an esophagogastric anastomosis. The three-stage McKeown approach adds a third incision in the neck to complete the cervical anastomosis. Recent approaches by some surgeons use what is called extended esophagectomy, where more surrounding tissue, including lymph nodes, is removed en bloc.

If the person cannot swallow at all, an esophageal stent may be inserted to keep the esophagus open; stents may also assist in occluding fistulas. A nasogastric tube may be necessary to continue feeding while treatment for the tumor is given, and some patients require a gastrostomy (feeding hole in the skin that gives direct access to the stomach). The latter two are especially important if the patient tends to aspirate food or saliva into the airways, predisposing for aspiration pneumonia.

=== Chemotherapy and radiotherapy ===
The two major types of esophageal cancer (adenocarcinoma and squamous cell carcinoma) differ from one another pathologically and thus each type requires specific treatment. In general, esophageal squamous cell carcinoma is more sensitive to radiation therapy. Chemotherapy also depends on the tumor type, but tends to be a platinum agent such as cisplatin-based (carboplatin or oxaliplatin may alternatively be used) plus paclitaxel in esophageal squamous cell carcinoma. In those with esophageal adenocarcinoma the standard chemotherapy regiment is FLOT, which consists of fluorouracil, leucovorin, oxaliplatin, and docetaxel. For inoperable esophageal cancer (both types) a platinum agent may be used with fluoropyrimidine or a platinum agent with a taxane. In more studies, addition of epirubicin was better than other three drug regimens in advanced nonresectable cancer. However, a meta-analysis in 2017 failed to demonstrate that anthracyclines such as epirubicin improved survival. Therefore in metastatic cancer, a two drug combination is now standard.

Cancer immunotherapy prolongs survival when added to chemoradiation in the treatment of esophageal cancer. Immune checkpoint inhibitors (PD-1 [programmed death-1] inhibitors) such as nivolumab, pembrolizumab, tislelizumab prolong survival after neoadjuvant chemoradiotherapy and surgery in patients with residual locally advanced esophageal squamous cell carcinoma. Immune checkpoint inhibitors may also be used if people have residual cancer after surgery and chemoradiation. Her2neu oncogene (cancer causing gene) positive tumors respond to treatment with the anti-Her2neu monoclonal antibody trastuzumab. And esophageal tumors with high expression of claudin 18.2 proteins have a greater response to the anti-claudin monoclonal antibody zolbetuximab. Ramucirumab is a human vascular endothelial growth factor (VEGF) blocking monoclonal antibody which may also be used as immunotherapy as a second-line agent if the cancer does not have PD-1, Her2neu, or claudin 18.2 cancer causing gene abnormalities. VEGF facilitates blood vessel growth to allow tumor cells to grow.

Chemotherapy may be given after surgery (adjuvant, i.e. to reduce risk of recurrence), before surgery (neoadjuvant) or if surgery is not possible. Cisplatin and fluorouracil were most commonly used a, however the REAL-2 trial confirmed that oxaliplatin and capecitabine were non-inferior and potentially more convenient.

Radiotherapy is given before, during, or after chemotherapy or surgery. Definitive chemoradiotherapy (with high doses of radiation) can be given with intent to cure disease in those who are not candidates for surgery, or with proximal esophageal cancers (in which a laryngectomy would be difficult). Radiotherapy may also be given on its own for palliative purposes, to shrink the tumor size and prolong life in incurable disease.

=== Other approaches ===
Forms of endoscopic therapy have been used for stage 0 and I disease: endoscopic mucosal resection (EMR) and mucosal ablation using radiofrequency ablation, photodynamic therapy, Nd-YAG laser, or argon plasma coagulation.

Laser therapy is the use of high-intensity light to destroy tumor cells while affecting only the treated area. This is typically done if the cancer cannot be removed by surgery. The relief of a blockage can help with pain and difficulty swallowing. Photodynamic therapy, a type of laser therapy, involves the use of drugs that are absorbed by cancer cells; when exposed to a special light, the drugs become active and destroy the cancer cells.

For incurable disease, palliative radiotherapy may be used to shrink the tumor size and prolong life. An esophageal stent may also be placed for comfort purposes to allow the person to eat.

Malnutrition is common in those with esophageal cancer. A feeding tube is sometimes required. This tube can be passed from the skin surface directly to the stomach to allow tube feedings.

Internal radiotherapy for esophageal cancer

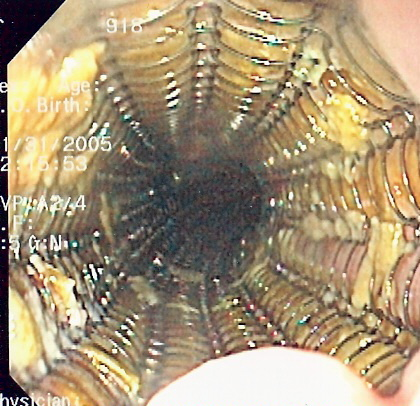
Self-expandable metallic stents are sometimes used for palliative care

== Prognosis ==
In general, the prognosis of esophageal cancer is quite poor, because most patients present with advanced disease. By the time the first symptoms (such as difficulty swallowing) appear, the disease has already progressed. The overall five-year survival rate (5YSR) in the United States is around 15%, and most people die within the first year of diagnosis. The latest survival data for England and Wales (patients diagnosed during 2007) show that only one in ten people survives esophageal cancer for at least ten years.

Individualized prognosis depends largely on stage. Those with cancer restricted entirely to the esophageal mucosa have about an 80% 5YSR, but submucosal involvement brings this down to less than 50%. Extension into the muscularis propria (muscle layer of the esophagus) suggests a 20% 5YSR, and extension to the structures adjacent to the esophagus predict a 7% 5YSR. Patients with distant metastases (who are not candidates for curative surgery) have a less than 3% 5YSR.

== Epidemiology ==
Incidence of esophageal cancer in both sex per 100,000 population (age-standardized rate) in 2022 0–1 1–1.8 1.8–2.9 2.9–4.2 4.2–17.9 No data / Not applicable

Death from esophageal cancer per million persons in 2012 0–4 5–6 7–10 11–15 16–26 27–36 37–45 46–59 60–75 76–142

Esophageal cancer is the eighth most frequently diagnosed cancer worldwide, and because of its poor prognosis, it is the sixth most common cause of cancer-related deaths. It caused about 400,000 deaths in 2012, accounting for about 5% of all cancer deaths (about 456,000 new cases were diagnosed, representing about 3% of all cancers).

ESCC (esophageal squamous-cell carcinoma) comprises 60–70% of all cases of esophageal cancer worldwide, while EAC (esophageal adenocarcinoma) accounts for a further 20–30% (melanomas, leiomyosarcomas, carcinoids and lymphomas are less common types). The incidence of the two main types of esophageal cancer varies greatly between different geographical areas. In general, ESCC is more common in the developing world, and EAC is more common in the developed world.

The worldwide incidence rate of ESCC in 2012 was 5.2 new cases per 100,000 person-years, with a male predominance (7.7 per 100,000 in men vs. 2.8 in women). It was the common type in 90% of the countries studied. ESCC is particularly frequent in the so-called "Asian esophageal cancer belt", an area that passes through northern China, southern Russia, north-eastern Iran, northern Afghanistan and eastern Turkey. In 2012, about 80% of ESCC cases worldwide occurred in central and south-eastern Asia, and over half (53%) of all cases were in China. The countries with the highest estimated national incidence rates were (in Asia) Mongolia and Turkmenistan and (in Africa) Malawi, Kenya and Uganda. The problem of esophageal cancer has long been recognized in the eastern and southern parts of Sub-Saharan Africa, where ESCC appears to predominate.

In Western countries, EAC has become the dominant form of the disease, following an increase in incidence over recent decades (in contrast to the incidence of ESCC, which has remained largely stable). In 2012, the global incidence rate for EAC was 0.7 per 100,000 with a strong male predominance (1.1 per 100,000 in men vs. 0.3 in women). Areas with particularly high incidence rates include northern and western Europe, North America and Oceania. The countries with highest recorded rates were the UK, Netherlands, Ireland, Iceland and New Zealand.

=== United States ===
In the United States, esophageal cancer is the seventh-leading cause of cancer-related deaths among males (making up 4% of the total). The National Cancer Institute estimated that there were about 18,000 new cases and more than 15,000 deaths from esophageal cancer in 2013; the American Cancer Society estimated that during 2014, about 18,170 new esophageal cancer cases would be diagnosed, resulting in 15,450 deaths.

The squamous-cell carcinoma type is more common among African American males with a history of heavy smoking or alcohol use. Until the 1970s, squamous-cell carcinoma accounted for the vast majority of esophageal cancers in the United States. In recent decades, incidence of adenocarcinoma of the esophagus (which is associated with Barrett's esophagus) steadily rose in the United States to the point that it has now surpassed squamous-cell carcinoma. In contrast to squamous-cell carcinoma, esophageal adenocarcinoma is more common in white American men (over the age of 60) than it is in African Americans. Multiple reports indicate esophageal adenocarcinoma incidence has increased during the past 20 years, especially in non-Hispanic white men. Esophageal adenocarcinoma age-adjusted incidence increased in New Mexico from 1973 to 2002. This increase was found in non-Hispanic whites and Hispanics and became predominant in non-Hispanic whites. Esophageal cancer incidence and mortality rates for African Americans continue to be higher than the rate for Causasians. However, incidence and mortality of esophageal cancer has significantly decreased among African Americans since the early 1980s, whereas with whites it has continued to increase. Between 1975 and 2004, incidence of the adenocarcinoma type increased among white American males by over 460% and among white American females by 335%.

=== United Kingdom ===
The incidence of esophageal adenocarcinoma has risen considerably in the UK in recent decades. Overall, esophageal cancer is the thirteenth most common cancer in the UK (around 8,300 people were diagnosed with the disease in 2011), and it is the sixth most common cause of cancer death (around 7,700 people died in 2012).

== Society and culture ==
=== Notable cases ===
Humphrey Bogart, actor, died of esophageal cancer in 1957, aged 57.

Billy Strayhorn, American jazz composer, pianist, lyricist, and arranger, who collaborated with bandleader and composer Duke Ellington, died of esophageal cancer in 1967 at age 51.

John Thaw, actor, died of esophageal cancer in 2002, at the age of 60.

Christopher Hitchens, author and journalist, died of esophageal cancer in 2011, aged 62.

Morrissey in October 2015 stated he has the disease and has described his experience when he first heard he had it.

Mako Iwamatsu, voice actor for Avatar: The Last Airbender as General Iroh and Samurai Jack as Aku, died of esophageal cancer in 2006, aged 72.

Robert Kardashian, attorney and businessman, died of esophageal cancer in 2003, aged 59.

Traci Braxton, singer and reality TV star, died of esophageal cancer in 2022, aged 50.

Andrew Bonar Law resigned as Prime Minister of the United Kingdom in 1923 and died of throat cancer shortly after aged 65.

Ed Sullivan, host of the prominent self-titled television program The Ed Sullivan Show, died of esophageal cancer in 1974 at the age of 73.

Lynn Yamada Davis, chef YouTube star, died of esophageal cancer in 2024, aged 67.

Richard Dawson, comic, actor, panelist on Match Game, host of Family Feud, and civil rights activist died of esophageal cancer at 79.

Mike Rinder, former senior executive in the Church of Scientology and noted critic of the organization, died of esophageal cancer in 2025.

== Research directions ==
The risk of esophageal squamous-cell carcinoma may be reduced in people using aspirin or related NSAIDs, but in the absence of randomized controlled trials the current evidence is inconclusive.

The genomics of esophageal adenocarcinoma is being studied using cancer genome sequencing. Esophageal adenocarcinoma is characterized by complex tumor genomes with heterogeneity within the tumor micro-environment.

== See also ==
- Esophagogastric junctional adenocarcinoma
