= Howel–Evans syndrome =

Tylosis with esophageal cancer
- Specialty: Medical genetics

Howel–Evans syndrome is an extremely rare condition involving thickening of the skin in the palms of the hands and the soles of the feet (hyperkeratosis). This familial disease is associated with a high lifetime risk of esophageal cancer. For this reason, it is sometimes known as tylosis with oesophageal cancer (TOC).

The condition is inherited in an autosomal dominant manner, and it has been linked to a mutation in the RHBDF2 gene. It was first described in 1958.

== Presentation ==
This condition is inherited as an autosomal dominant syndrome and characterized by palmoplantar keratoderma, oral precursor lesions particularly on the gums (leukoplakia) and a high lifetime risk of esophageal cancer (95% develop esophageal cancer by the age of 65). Relapsing cutaneous horns of the lips has been reported in this condition.

There are several types of this condition have been described – epidermolytic (Vörner type) and non-epidermolytic. Another classification divides these into an early onset type (type B) which occurs in the first year of life and is usually benign and a type A tylosis which occurs between the ages of 5 and 15 years and is strongly associated with esophageal cancer.

Cytoglobin gene expression in oesophageal biopsies is significantly reduced (70% reduction) in this condition. The mechanism of this change is not known.

== Genetics ==
The gene responsible is RHBDF2 (Rhomboid family member 2), which is located on the long arm of chromosome 17 (at 17q25). The mutation responsible for the disease was detected in Finnish, German, UK and US families. The RHBDF2 protein is a member of the intramembranous serine proteases. It is thought to play an important role in the epithelial response to injury in the esophagus and skin. RHBDF2 is involved in the regulation of the secretion of several ligands of the epidermal growth factor receptor.

== Molecular biology ==
The rhomboid proteases – the first known intramembranous serine proteases – were discovered in 1988. The first rhomboid protease was cloned in 1990 Rhomboid proteases have a core of six transmembrane helices with the active site residues lying in a hydrophilic cavity. Rhomboid family members are widely conserved and found in all three kingdoms of life.

RHBDF2 associates with the rhomboid like protease 2 (RHBDL2) and inhibits its activity.

Mutations in RHBDF2 inhibit tumour necrosis factor alpha.

RHBDL2 also acts on Epidermal growth factor and EphrinB3.

Thrombomodulin – a membrane glycoprotein – is upregulated in neoepidermis during cutaneous wound healing. RHBDL2 cleaves thrombomodulin at the transmembrane domain and causes the release of soluble thrombomodulin.

=== Other associations ===
RHBDF2 may also play a role in ovarian epithelial cancer.

Possible associations with gastric cancer and lung cancer have been suggested. Other possible associations include corneal defects, congenital pulmonary stenosis, total anomalous pulmonary venous connection deafness and optic atrophy.

=== Related genes ===
A related gene – Rhomboid domain containing 2 (RHBDD2) – appears to be important in breast cancer.

A second related gene – rhomboid family 1 (RHBDF1) – appears to be important in head and neck cancer.

A third member of this family – RHBDD1 – cleaves Bcl-2-interacting killer (BIK) – a proapoptotic member of the B cell lymphoma 2 (Bcl-2) family.

These proteins may also have a role in diabetes.

== Diagnosis ==
=== Differential diagnosis ===
The differential diagnosis is quite extensive and includes

- Buschke–Fischer–Brauer disease
- Curth–Macklin ichthyosis
- Gamborg Nielsen syndrome
- Greither disease
- Haber syndrome
- Hereditary punctate palmoplantar keratoderma
- Jadassohn–Lewandowsky syndrome
- Keratosis follicularis spinulosa decalvans
- Keratosis linearis with ichthyosis congenital and sclerosing keratoderma syndrome
- Meleda disease
- Mucosa hyperkeratosis syndrome
- Naegeli–Franceschetti–Jadassohn syndrome
- Naxos disease
- Olmsted syndrome
- Palmoplantar keratoderma and leukokeratosis anogenitalis
- Pandysautonomia
- Papillomatosis of Gougerot and Carteaud
- Papillon–Lefèvre syndrome
- Punctate porokeratotic keratoderma
- Richner–Hanhart syndrome
- Schöpf–Schulz–Passarge syndrome
- Unna Thost disease
- Vohwinkel syndrome
- Wong's dermatomyositis

== Treatment ==
Systemic retinoids are the drugs used for tylosis.

== Terminology ==
The condition is also referred to by several other names, including "familial keratoderma with carcinoma of the esophagus," "focal non-epidermolytic palmoplantar keratoderma with carcinoma of the esophagus," "Palmoplantar ectodermal dysplasia type III," "palmoplantar keratoderma associated with esophageal cancer," "tylosis" and "tylosis–esophageal cancer"

== See also ==
- Palmoplantar keratoderma
- List of cutaneous conditions
