= Tylosis =

Tylosis may refer to:

In medicine

- Diffuse nonepidermolytic palmoplantar keratoderma, a skin condition of the palms and soles
- Howel–Evans syndrome, a skin condition of the palms and soles that is also associated with esophageal cancer

Other uses

- Tylosis (botany), a process in tree decay
- Tylosis (beetle), a genus of longhorn beetle
