= SEMS =

SEMS may refer to:

- Self-expandable metallic stent, a medical tube to hold open the gastrointestinal tract
- A screw with a pre-assembled washer
- A nut with a pre-assembled washer
- Stock Exchange of Malaysia and Singapore (SEMS)
