= Caustic ingestion =

Gastrointestinal damage due to ingesting a corrosive substance

- Specialty: Gastroenterology, Emergency medicine, Pulmonology
- Symptoms: Pain, drooling, vomiting, bleeding, mouth and tongue swelling, eye irritation
- Complications: Esophageal stricture, esophageal cancer, aspiration pneumonia
- Usual onset: Immediate
- Prevention: Safe storage of caustic substances
- Treatment: Surgery, medications, observation

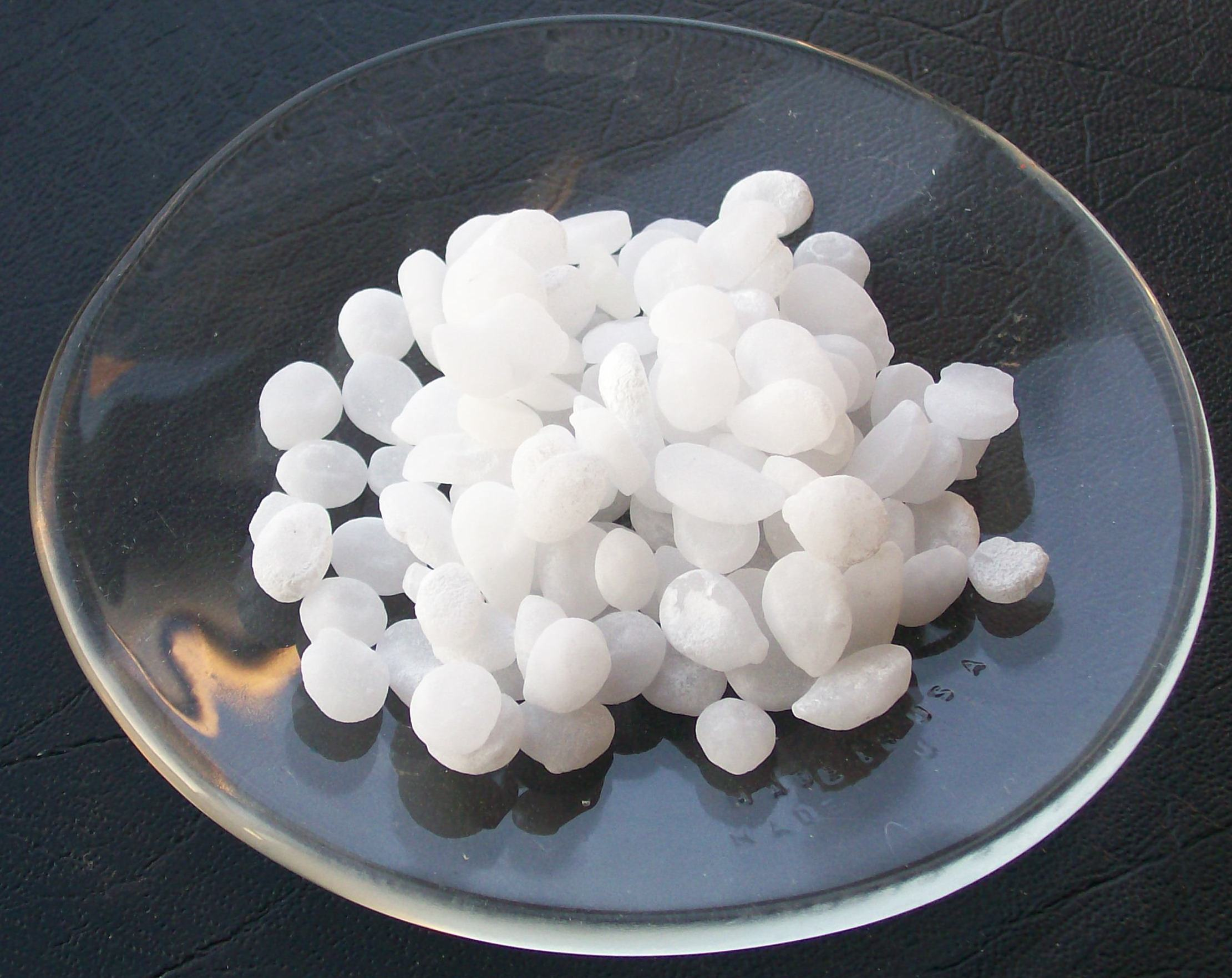
Pellets of sodium hydroxide.

Caustic ingestion occurs when someone accidentally or deliberately ingests a caustic or corrosive substance. Depending on the nature of the substance, the duration of exposure and other factors it can lead to varying degrees of damage to the oral mucosa, the esophagus, and the lining of the stomach.

The severity of the injury can be determined by endoscopy of the upper digestive tract, although CT scanning may be more useful to determine whether surgery may be required.

During the healing process, strictures of the oesophagus may form, which may require therapeutic dilatation and insertion of a stent.

== Signs and symptoms ==
Immediate manifestations of caustic substance ingestions include erosions of mucosal surfaces of the gastrointestinal tract or airway (which can cause bleeding if the erosions extend to a blood vessel), mouth and tongue swelling, drooling or hypersalivation, nausea, vomiting, dyspnea, dysphonia/aphonia, irritation of the eyes and skin. Perforation of the esophagus can lead to mediastinitis or perforation of the stomach or bowel can lead to peritonitis Swelling of the airway or laryngospasm can occur leading to compromised breathing. Injuries affecting the respiratory system include aspiration pneumonia and laryngeal sores. Signs of respiratory compromise include stridor and a change in a person's voice.

Later manifestations of caustic substance ingestions include esophageal strictures or stenosis; which can result in chronic pain and malnutrition. Esophageal strictures more commonly occur after more severe mucosal injury, occurring in to 71% and 100% of grade 2b and 3 mucosal lesions respectively. Remote manifestations of caustic ingestions include esophageal cancer. People who have a history of caustic substance ingestion are 1000-3000 times more likely to develop esophageal cancer with most cases occurring 10–30 years after the ingestion.

== Pathophysiology ==
Acids with a pH of less than 2 or alkalis with a pH above 12 are capable of causing the most extensive injuries in ingestions. Alkalis damage tissue by saponifying fats, leading to liquefaction necrosis which allows the alkalis to reach deeper tissues. Acids denature proteins via coagulation necrosis, this type of necrosis is thought to prevent the acid from reaching deeper tissues. Clinically, the pH, concentration, volume of ingested substance in addition to the duration of time in contact with tissue as well as percentage of body surface area involved determine the severity of the injury.

== Diagnosis ==
=== Classification ===
The severity of injuries to the mucosa of the gastrointestinal tract is commonly rated using the Zargar criteria.

Category	Findings
0	Normal examination
1	Mucosal edema and erythema
2a	Superficial ulcerations or erosions, friability, blister formation, exudates, hemorrhages
2b	Deep ulcerations (either discrete or circumferential) as well as the findings described in 2a
3a	Multiple small, scattered areas of necrosis
3b	Extensive necrosis

== Treatment ==
Common treatments used for toxic substance ingestions are ineffective, or are even harmful, when implemented in ingestions of caustic substances. Clinical attempts to empty the stomach can cause further injuries. Activated charcoal does not neutralize caustics and can also obscure endoscopic visualization. There is no known clinical benefit of neutralization of the caustic substances; neutralization releases heat as well as causing gaseous distention and vomiting, all of which can worsen injuries.

Signs of airway compromise including decreased level of consciousness, stridor, change in voice, inability to control oral secretions necessitate intubation and mechanical ventillation. IV fluids are often needed to maintain hydration and replace insensible water losses.

Endoscopy should be done within the first 24–48 hours of ingestion as subsequent wound softening increases the risk of perforation. Endoscopically inserted nasogastric tubes can serve as a stent to prevent esophageal strictures as well as allow tube feedings. A CT scan, often enhanced with contrast, can also be used to evaluate injuries.

The most common surgical methods of treatment in children include esophageal dilation and esophageal replacement as less commonly implantation of an esophageal stent. When conservative treatment fails, surgical reconstruction can be performed. Over time, the transferred intestinal segment will undergo changes called esophagisation.

== Epidemiology ==
In general, most ingestions in children involve exploratory ingestions of small amounts of caustic substances, with the rare exception being cases of child abuse where larger amounts are often ingested. Caustic ingestions in adults usually involve larger amounts of ingested material during attempts of self harm. Due to the greater amount of material usually ingested; injuries are often more severe in the intentional ingestions of adolescents and adults as compared to those of children. Commonly ingested substances include ammonium hydroxide (found in general cleaner and grease remover), sodium hydroxide or potassium hydroxide (found in drain opener or oven cleaner), sodium hypochlorite (bleach), oxalic acid (metal polish) and hydrochloric acid (toilet bowl cleaner). Storage of caustic substances in water or drink containers is a risk factor for accidental ingestion of these materials, particularly in children. Boys of preschool age are at the greatest risk of accidental caustic ingestion.

== Prevention ==
Preventative measures have been recommended that are intended to decrease the risk of accidental ingestion of caustic substances including:

- Keeping caustic substances in locked cabinets or on upper shelves
- Not storing chemical substances in food or drink containers
- Not keeping large amounts of detergent in the home
- Not mentioning a drug as "candy" when giving it as medication
- Keeping the phone number for poison control in the home
- Keeping caustic substances in labelled containers
