= Joanne Lemieux =

Canadian scientist

- Education: New York University (PhD); Dalhousie University (MSc)
- Scientific career
- Workplaces: University of Alberta
- Thesis: How did the substrate cross the membrane? Structural studies of the human erythrocyte anion exchanger and the Escherichia coli glycerol-3-phosphate transporter. (2003)

M. Joanne Lemieux is a Canadian scientist who is a Professor of Structural Biology at the University of Alberta. She studies the structures of membrane proteins that are critical to disease in an effort to identify novel therapeutic strategies. During the COVID-19 pandemic Lemieux worked to develop an antiviral drug that could protect people from coronavirus disease.

== Early life and education ==
Lemieux studied biochemistry at Dalhousie University. During her undergraduate studies she worked alongside Catherine Mezei, studying membrane proteins within the myelinating peripheral nerve. She remained there for her master's studies, where she continued studying the myelinating peripheral nerve, but instead specialised on lipoproteins. After graduating with her master's degree, Lemieux moved to New York University, where she researched the human erythrocyte anion exchanger.

== Research and career ==
Lemieux directs the University of Alberta Membrane Protein Diseases Research Group. Her research considers proteases – membrane proteins that are involved with breast cancer, Parkinson's disease and urinary tract infections. Lemieux has extensively studied rhomboid intermembrane proteases to better understand how they cleave targets within the membrane. She primarily makes use of X-ray crystallography, which allows her to generate structure-function relationships of these rhomboid proteases. She uncovered the rhomboid protease of Haemophilus influenzae.

During the COVID-19 pandemic Lemieux investigated whether an antiviral drug that was used to treat peritonitis in cats could be used to protect people from coronavirus disease. Peritonitis is an aberrant immune system response that cats experience toward feline coronavirus, and was shown to be almost identical to the SARS virus. The human coronavirus disease is an RNA virus, and makes use of proteases to replicate within a cell. The drug itself is a protease inhibitor, and acts to inhibit this replication process.

== Selected publications ==
- Huang, Y. (2003-08-01). "Structure and Mechanism of the Glycerol-3-Phosphate Transporter from Escherichia coli". Science. 301 (5633): 616–620. Bibcode:2003Sci...301..616H. doi:10.1126/science.1087619. ISSN 0036-8075. PMID 12893936. S2CID 14078813.
- Lemieux, M. Joanne; Mark, Brian L.; Cherney, Maia M.; Withers, Stephen G.; Mahuran, Don J.; James, Michael N.G. (2006). "Crystallographic Structure of Human β-Hexosaminidase A: Interpretation of Tay-Sachs Mutations and Loss of GM2 Ganglioside Hydrolysis". Journal of Molecular Biology. 359 (4): 913–929. doi:10.1016/j.jmb.2006.04.004. ISSN 0022-2836. PMC 2910082. PMID 16698036.
- Lemieux, M. Joanne Fischer, Sarah J. Cherney, Maia M. Bateman, Katherine S. James, Michael N. G. The crystal structure of the rhomboid peptidase from Haemophilus influenzae provides insight into intramembrane proteolysis. National Academy of Sciences. OCLC 678792150.
