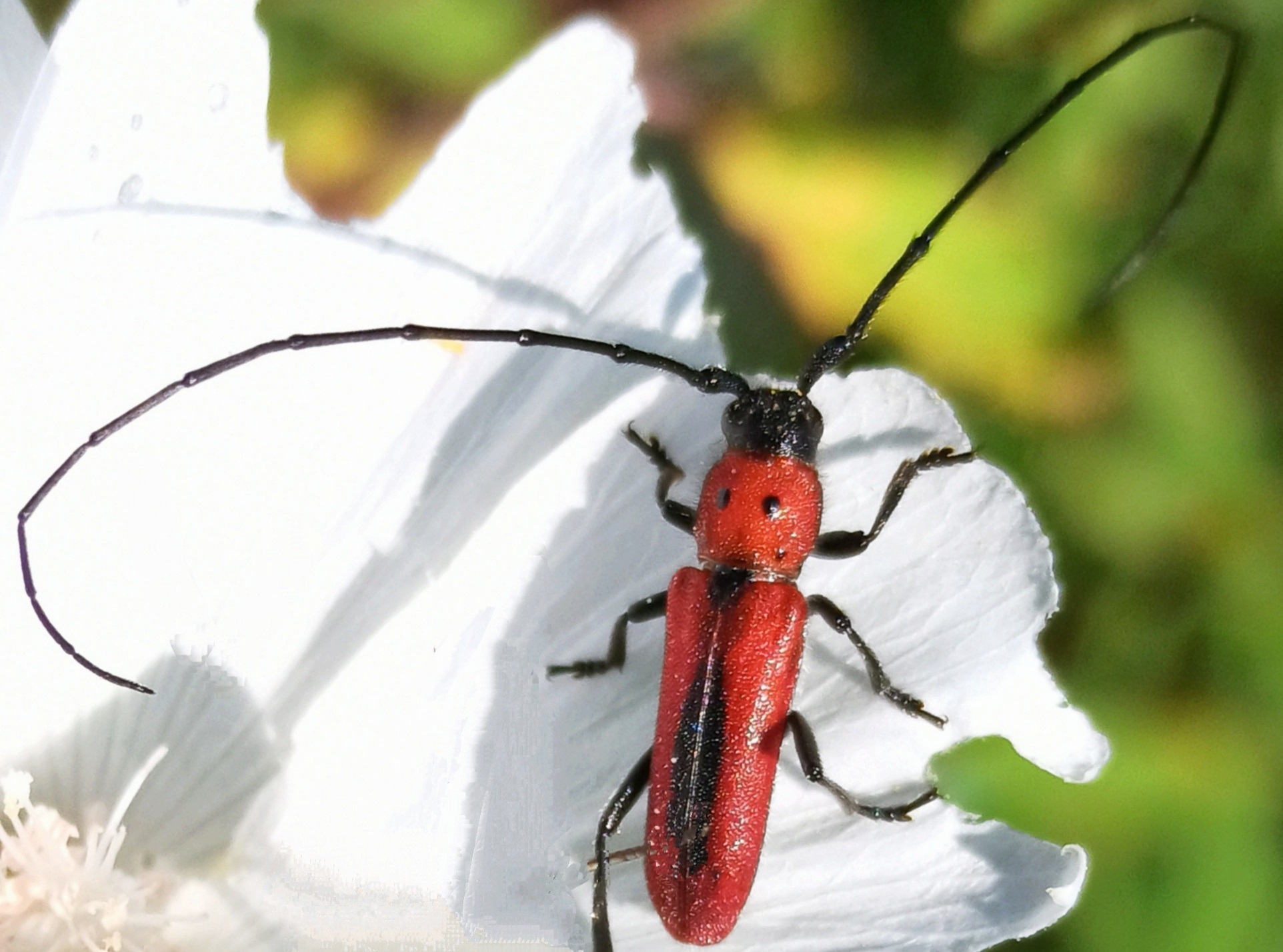

Scientific classification
- Domain: Eukaryota
- Kingdom: Animalia
- Phylum: Arthropoda
- Class: Insecta
- Order: Coleoptera
- Suborder: Polyphaga
- Infraorder: Cucujiformia
- Family: Cerambycidae
- Genus: Tylosis
- Species: T. suturalis

Binomial name
- Tylosis suturalis White, 1853

= Tylosis suturalis =

Species of beetle

Tylosis suturalis is a species of beetle in the family Cerambycidae. It was described by White in 1853.
