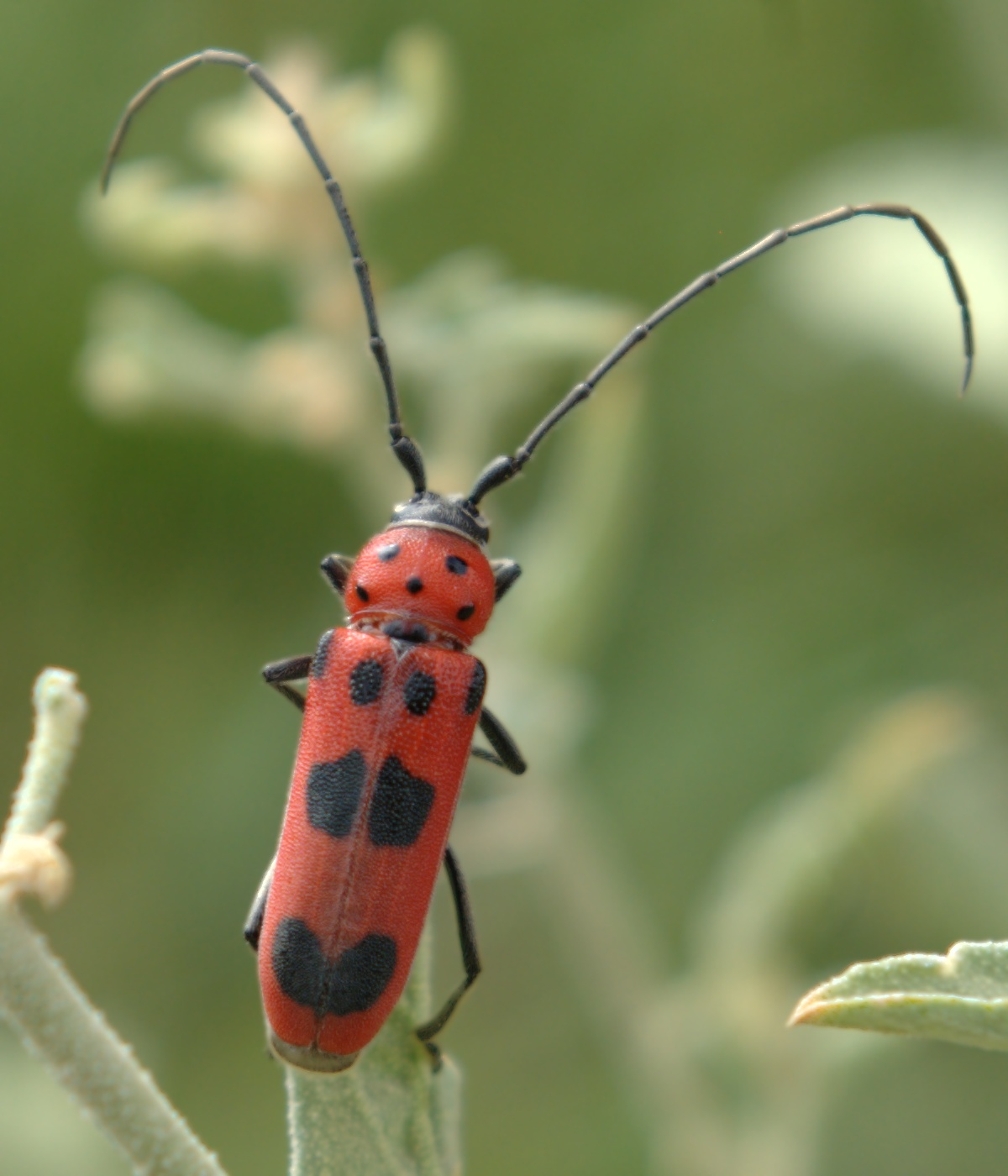
- Adult on globemallow leaf

Scientific classification
- Domain: Eukaryota
- Kingdom: Animalia
- Phylum: Arthropoda
- Class: Insecta
- Order: Coleoptera
- Suborder: Polyphaga
- Infraorder: Cucujiformia
- Family: Cerambycidae
- Genus: Tylosis
- Species: T. maculatus

Binomial name
- Tylosis maculatus LeConte, 1850

= Tylosis maculatus =

Species of beetle

Tylosis maculatus is a species of beetle in the family Cerambycidae. It was described by John Lawrence LeConte in 1850.
