= Rhomboid-related protein 2 =

Protein found in humans

RHBDL2

Identifiers
- Aliases: RHBDL2, RRP2, rhomboid like 2
- External IDs: OMIM: 608962; MGI: 3608413; GeneCards: RHBDL2
Enzyme activity
EC #	BRENDA	ExPASy	KEGG	MetaCyc
3.4.21.105	↗	↗	↗	↗

Gene location (Human)
Chr.	Chromosome 1 (human)
Band	1p34.3	Start	38,885,807 bp
Band	1p34.3	End	38,941,830 bp

Gene location (Mouse)
Chr.	Chromosome 4 (mouse)
Band	4|4 D2.2	Start	123,681,667 bp
Band	4|4 D2.2	End	123,723,697 bp
RNA expression pattern
Bgee	Human / Mouse (ortholog); Top expressed in: mucosa of sigmoid colon; rectum; mucosa of transverse colon; C1 segment; skin of leg; skin of abdomen; oral cavity; corpus callosum; nasal epithelium; palpebral conjunctiva / Top expressed in: lobe of prostate; left colon; membranous bone; calvaria; Dermatocranium; mandible; blastocyst; maxilla; transitional epithelium of urinary bladder; duodenum; More reference expression data
BioGPS	n/a
Gene ontology
Molecular function	peptidase activity; serine-type peptidase activity; serine-type endopeptidase activity; hydrolase activity
Cellular component	integral component of membrane; plasma membrane; membrane
Biological process	protein processing; proteolysis
Sources:Amigo / QuickGO
Orthologs
Databases	NCBI: entry; OMA: entry
Species	Human	Mouse
Entrez	54933	230726
Ensembl	ENSG00000158315	ENSMUSG00000043333
UniProt	Q9NX52	A2AGA4
RefSeq (mRNA)	NM_017821; NM_001304746	NM_183163; NM_001356445
RefSeq (protein)	NP_001291675; NP_060291	NP_898986; NP_001343374
Location (UCSC)	Chr 1: 38.89 – 38.94 Mb	Chr 4: 123.68 – 123.72 Mb
PubMed search
- Wikidata
View/Edit Human	View/Edit Mouse

Rhomboid-related protein 2 is a protein that in humans is encoded by the RHBDL2 gene.

== Function ==
The protein encoded by this gene is a member of the rhomboid protease family of integral membrane proteins. This family contains proteins that are related to Drosophila rhomboid-1. Members of this family are found in both prokaryotes and eukaryotes and are thought to function as intramembrane serine proteases.

RHBDL2 functions as a sheddase and is localized to the plasma membrane. Known substrates of RHBDL2 include thrombomodulin and epidermal growth factor; profiling of the substrate repertoire of RHBDL2 has identified a number of additional type I membrane proteins substrates, including BCAM, SPINT1, and CLCP1.
