= POMP =

Protein-coding gene in the species Homo sapiens

Identifiers
- Aliases: POMP, C13orf12, PNAS-110, UMP1, HSPC014, proteasome maturation protein, PRAAS2
- External IDs: OMIM: 613386; MGI: 1913787; HomoloGene: 41077; GeneCards: POMP; OMA:POMP - orthologs

Gene location (Human)
Chr.	Chromosome 13 (human)
Band	13q12.3	Start	28,659,104 bp
Band	13q12.3	End	28,678,959 bp

Gene location (Mouse)
Chr.	Chromosome 5 (mouse)
Band	5|5 G3	Start	147,797,271 bp
Band	5|5 G3	End	147,813,266 bp
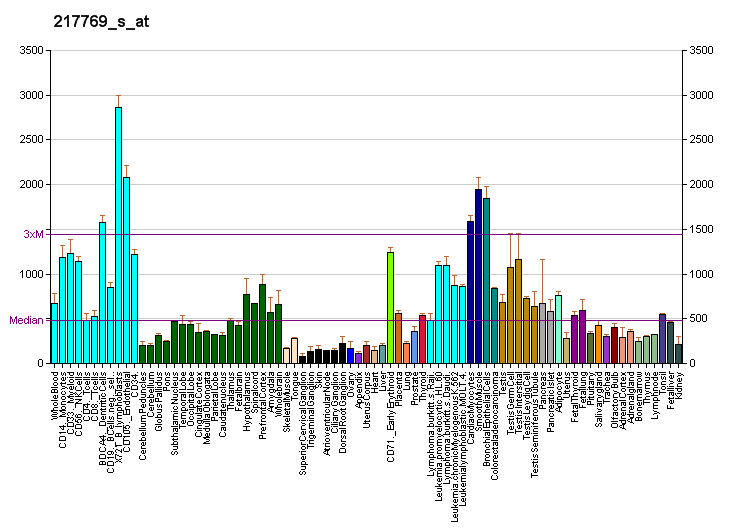
RNA expression pattern
Bgee	Human / Mouse (ortholog); Top expressed in: right ventricle; biceps brachii; mucosa of sigmoid colon; corpus epididymis; Skeletal muscle tissue of biceps brachii; oral cavity; male germ cell; sperm; muscle of trunk; tendon of biceps brachii / Top expressed in: neural tube; morula; yolk sac; ventricular zone; blastocyst; otic placode; epiblast; embryo; ganglionic eminence; embryo; More reference expression data
BioGPS	More reference expression data
Gene ontology
Molecular function	protein binding
Cellular component	cytoplasm; organelle membrane; cytosol; endoplasmic reticulum; membrane; nucleus; intracellular membrane-bounded organelle; nuclear speck
Biological process	proteasome assembly
Sources:Amigo / QuickGO
Orthologs
Species	Human	Mouse
Entrez	51371	66537
Ensembl	ENSG00000132963	ENSMUSG00000029649
UniProt	Q9Y244	Q9CQT5
RefSeq (mRNA)	NM_015932	NM_025624
RefSeq (protein)	NP_057016	NP_079900
Location (UCSC)	Chr 13: 28.66 – 28.68 Mb	Chr 5: 147.8 – 147.81 Mb
PubMed search
- Wikidata
View/Edit Human	View/Edit Mouse

Proteasome maturation protein is a protein that in humans is encoded by the POMP gene. It is a short-lived maturation factor required for 20S proteasome subunit biogenesis.

A single nucleotide deletion in this gene causes an autosomal recessive skin disorder, keratosis linearis with ichthyosis congenita and sclerosing keratoderma (KLICK) syndrome.
