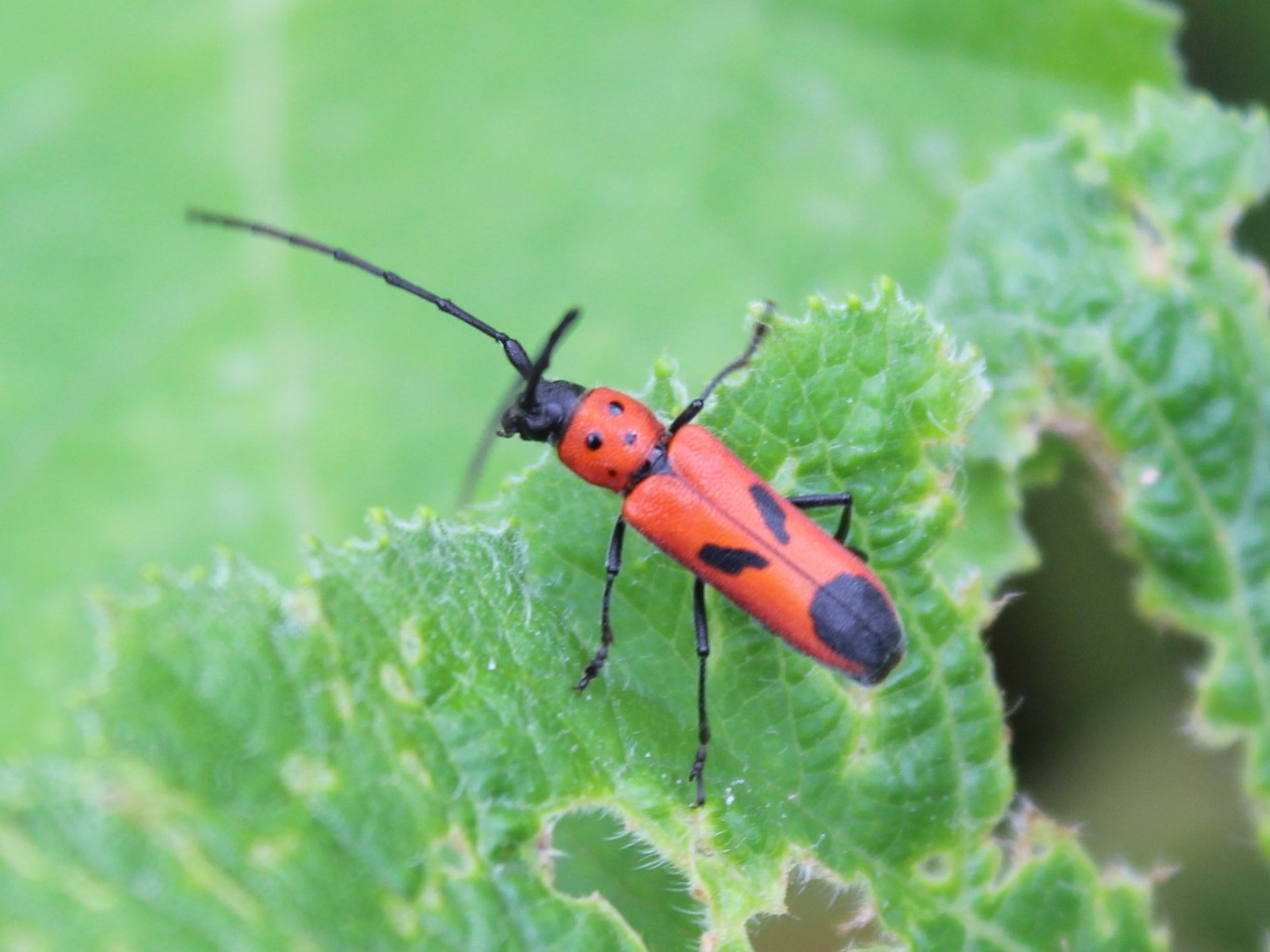

Scientific classification
- Domain: Eukaryota
- Kingdom: Animalia
- Phylum: Arthropoda
- Class: Insecta
- Order: Coleoptera
- Suborder: Polyphaga
- Infraorder: Cucujiformia
- Family: Cerambycidae
- Genus: Tylosis
- Species: T. hilaris

Binomial name
- Tylosis hilaris Linsley, 1957

= Tylosis hilaris =

Species of beetle

Tylosis hilaris is a species of beetle in the family Cerambycidae. It was described by Linsley in 1957.
