= Tylosis triangularis =

Scientific classification
- Domain: Eukaryota
- Kingdom: Animalia
- Phylum: Arthropoda
- Class: Insecta
- Order: Coleoptera
- Suborder: Polyphaga
- Infraorder: Cucujiformia
- Family: Cerambycidae
- Genus: Tylosis
- Species: T. triangularis

Binomial name
- Tylosis triangularis Monné & Martins, 1981

Species of beetle

Tylosis triangularis is a species of beetle in the family Cerambycidae. It was described by Monné & Martins in 1981.
