= Tylosis jimenezii =

Scientific classification
- Domain: Eukaryota
- Kingdom: Animalia
- Phylum: Arthropoda
- Class: Insecta
- Order: Coleoptera
- Suborder: Polyphaga
- Infraorder: Cucujiformia
- Family: Cerambycidae
- Genus: Tylosis
- Species: T. jimenezii

Binomial name
- Tylosis jimenezii Dugès, 1879

Species of beetle

Tylosis jimenezii is a species of beetle in the family Cerambycidae. It was described by Dugès in 1879.
