= Tylosis oculatus =

Scientific classification
- Domain: Eukaryota
- Kingdom: Animalia
- Phylum: Arthropoda
- Class: Insecta
- Order: Coleoptera
- Suborder: Polyphaga
- Infraorder: Cucujiformia
- Family: Cerambycidae
- Genus: Tylosis
- Species: T. oculatus

Binomial name
- Tylosis oculatus LeConte, 1850

Species of beetle

Tylosis oculatus is a species of beetle in the family Cerambycidae. It was described by John Lawrence LeConte in 1850.
