= RHBDF2 =

Protein-coding gene in the species Homo sapiens

Identifiers
- Aliases: RHBDF2, RHBDL5, RHBDL6, TOC, TOCG, TEC, iRhom2, rhomboid 5 homolog 2
- External IDs: OMIM: 614404; MGI: 2442473; GeneCards: RHBDF2

Gene location (Human)
Chr.	Chromosome 17 (human)
Band	17q25.1	Start	76,470,891 bp
Band	17q25.1	End	76,501,790 bp

Gene location (Mouse)
Chr.	Chromosome 11 (mouse)
Band	11|11 E2	Start	116,488,991 bp
Band	11|11 E2	End	116,517,845 bp
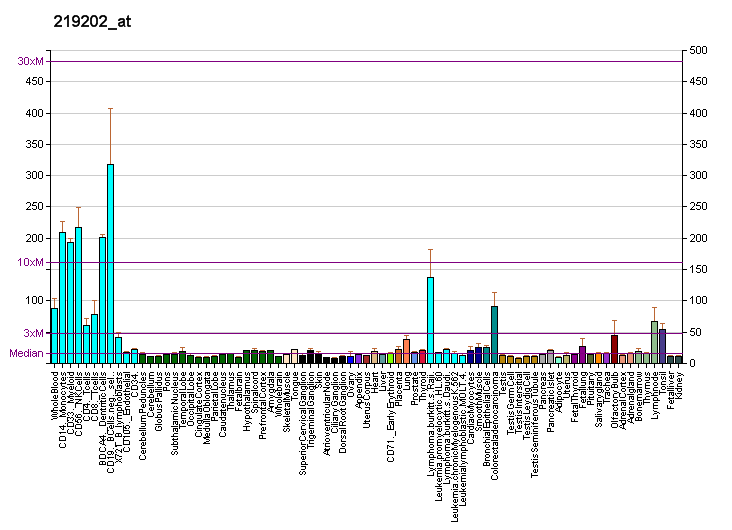
RNA expression pattern
Bgee	Human / Mouse (ortholog); Top expressed in: granulocyte; monocyte; spleen; sural nerve; blood; lymph node; skin of leg; skin of abdomen; upper lobe of left lung; C1 segment / Top expressed in: granulocyte; secondary oocyte; lip; muscle of thigh; bone marrow; mesenteric lymph nodes; spleen; zygote; primary oocyte; left lung lobe; More reference expression data
BioGPS	More reference expression data
Gene ontology
Molecular function	serine-type endopeptidase activity; growth factor binding; protein binding; peptidase activity; hydrolase activity
Cellular component	integral component of membrane; endoplasmic reticulum; membrane; plasma membrane; endoplasmic reticulum membrane
Biological process	protein transport; protein processing; regulation of epidermal growth factor receptor signaling pathway; proteolysis; regulation of protein secretion; negative regulation of protein secretion
Sources:Amigo / QuickGO
Orthologs
Databases	NCBI: entry; OMA: entry
Species	Human	Mouse
Entrez	79651	217344
Ensembl	ENSG00000129667	ENSMUSG00000020806
UniProt	Q6PJF5	Q80WQ6
RefSeq (mRNA)	NM_001005498; NM_024599; NM_001376228; NM_001376229; NM_001376230	NM_001167680; NM_172572
RefSeq (protein)	NP_001005498; NP_078875; NP_001363157; NP_001363158; NP_001363159	NP_001161152; NP_766160; NP_001390556; NP_001390557
Location (UCSC)	Chr 17: 76.47 – 76.5 Mb	Chr 11: 116.49 – 116.52 Mb
PubMed search
- Wikidata
View/Edit Human	View/Edit Mouse

Inactive rhomboid protein 2 is a protein that in humans is encoded by the RHBDF2 gene. The alternative name iRhom2 has been proposed, in order to clarify that it is a catalytically inactive member of the rhomboid family of intramembrane serine proteases.

The RHBDF2 gene is located on the long arm of chromosome 17 (17q25.1) on the Crick (minus) strand. It is 30.534 kilobases in length and encodes a protein of 856 amino acids with a predicted molecular weight of 96.686 kilodaltons.

The RHBDF2 protein plays an important role in the secretion of tumor necrosis factor alpha, and has also been implicated in familial esophageal cancer.

It is involved in the regulation of the secretion of several ligands of the epidermal growth factor receptor.
