= Intestinal metaplasia =

Abnormal transformation of bodily tissue into intestinal tissue

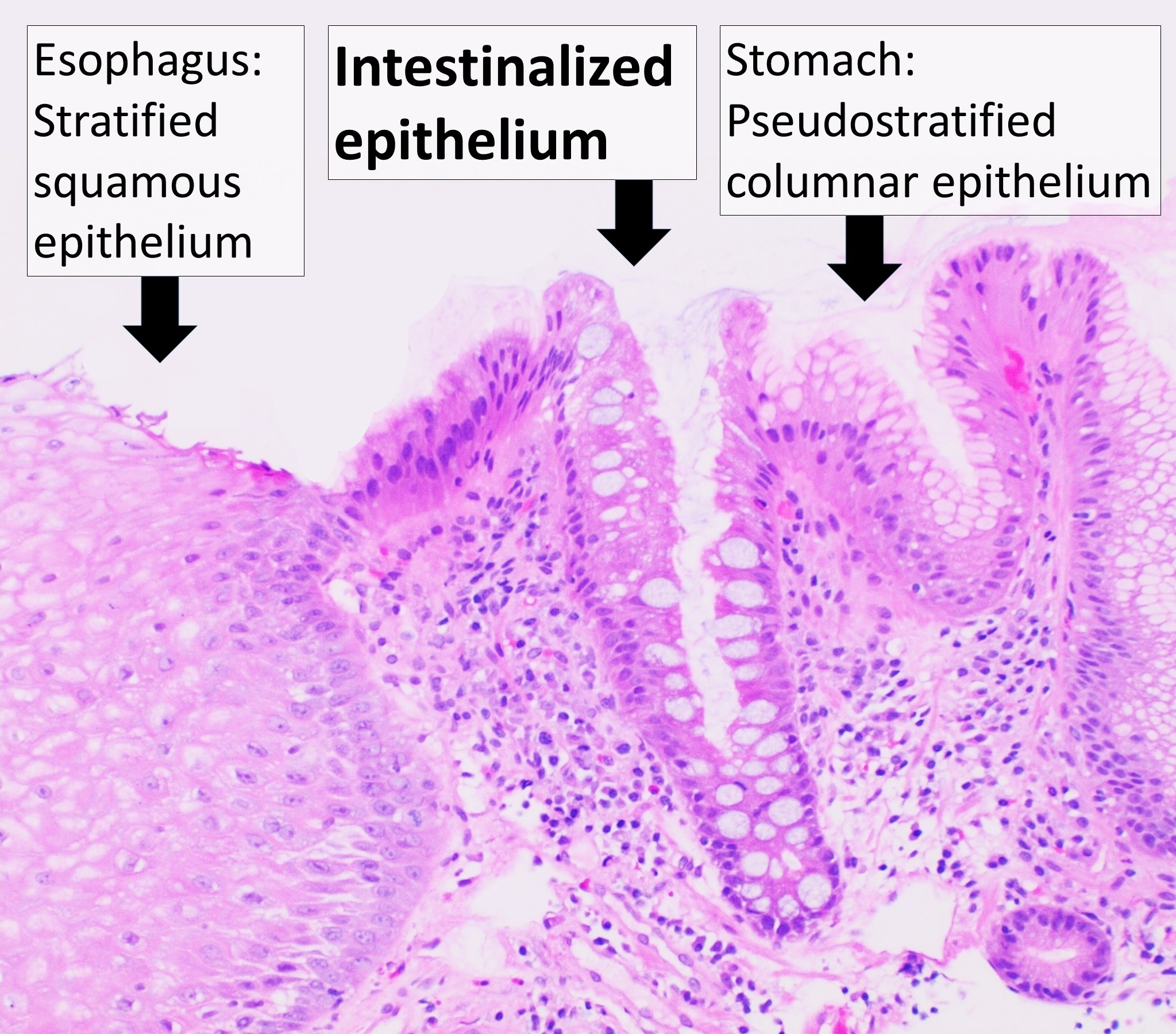
- Histopathology of Barrett's esophagus, showing intestinalized epithelium with Goblet cells, as opposed to normal stratified squamous epithelium of the esophagus, and pseudostratified columnar epithelium of the fundus of the stomach. H&E stain.

Intestinal metaplasia is the transformation (metaplasia) of epithelium (usually of the stomach or the esophagus) into a type of epithelium resembling that found in the intestine. In the esophagus, this is called Barrett's esophagus. Chronic inflammation caused by H. pylori infection in the stomach and GERD in the esophagus are seen as the primary instigators of metaplasia and subsequent adenocarcinoma formation. Initially, the transformed epithelium resembles the small intestine lining; in the later stages it resembles the lining of the colon. It is characterized by the appearance of goblet cells and expression of intestinal cell markers such as the transcription factor, CDX2.

Although H. pylori infection can cause gastrointestinal metaplasia, its eradication does not reverse the process. Bile reflux is an additional pathogenic factor in gastrointestinal metaplasia that can continuously irritate the gastric mucosa. Bile acids in refluxed fluid are widely reported to be associated with gastrointestinal metaplasia.

== Risk factors ==
Although it was originally reported that people of East Asian ethnicity with gastric intestinal metaplasia are at increased risk of stomach cancer, it is now clear that gastric intestinal metaplasia is also a risk factor in low-incidence regions like Europe. Risk factors for progression of gastric intestinal metaplasia to full blown cancer are smoking and family history.

== Latency ==
Intestinal metaplasia lesions that have an active DNA damage response are likely to experience extended latency in the premalignant state until the incidence of damages overrides the DNA damage response leading to clonal expansion and progression to cancer. During the DNA damage response, proteins are expressed that detect DNA damages and activate downstream responses like DNA repair, cell cycle checkpoints or apoptosis.
