= Haber syndrome =

- Specialty: Dermatology

Haber syndrome is a cutaneous disorder of hyperpigmentation characterized by reticulated pigmentation of the person's skin. A rare genodermatosis, its key features include "rosacea-like facial eruption[,] reticulated hyperpigmentation of major flexures, comedones on the back and neck, and pitted facial scars."

== See also ==
- List of cutaneous conditions
