= Keratosis linearis with ichthyosis congenita and sclerosing keratoderma syndrome =

- This condition is inherited in an autosomal recessive manner.
- Specialty: Dermatology
- Causes: Deletion in the POMP gene

Keratosis linearis with ichthyosis congenita and sclerosing keratoderma syndrome (KLICK syndrome) is a rare cutaneous condition characterized by ichthyosis and keratoderma.

It is an autosomal recessive disorder associated with a deletion in the transcription gene POMP, which codes proteasome maturation protein. This prevents the correct formation of filaggrin from profilaggrin.

Sympotmatic treatment with keratolytics and retinoids is successful, but if treatment is stopped, symptoms recur.

== See also ==
- CEDNIK syndrome
- List of cutaneous conditions
