= Curative care =

Healthcare given to cure a medical condition

Curative care or curative medicine is the health care given for medical conditions where a cure is considered achievable, or even possibly so, and directed to this end. Curative care differs from preventive care, which aims at preventing the appearance of diseases through pharmaceuticals and such techniques as immunization, exercise, proper eating habits and other life style issues, and from palliative care, which concentrates on reducing the severity of symptoms, such as pain.
