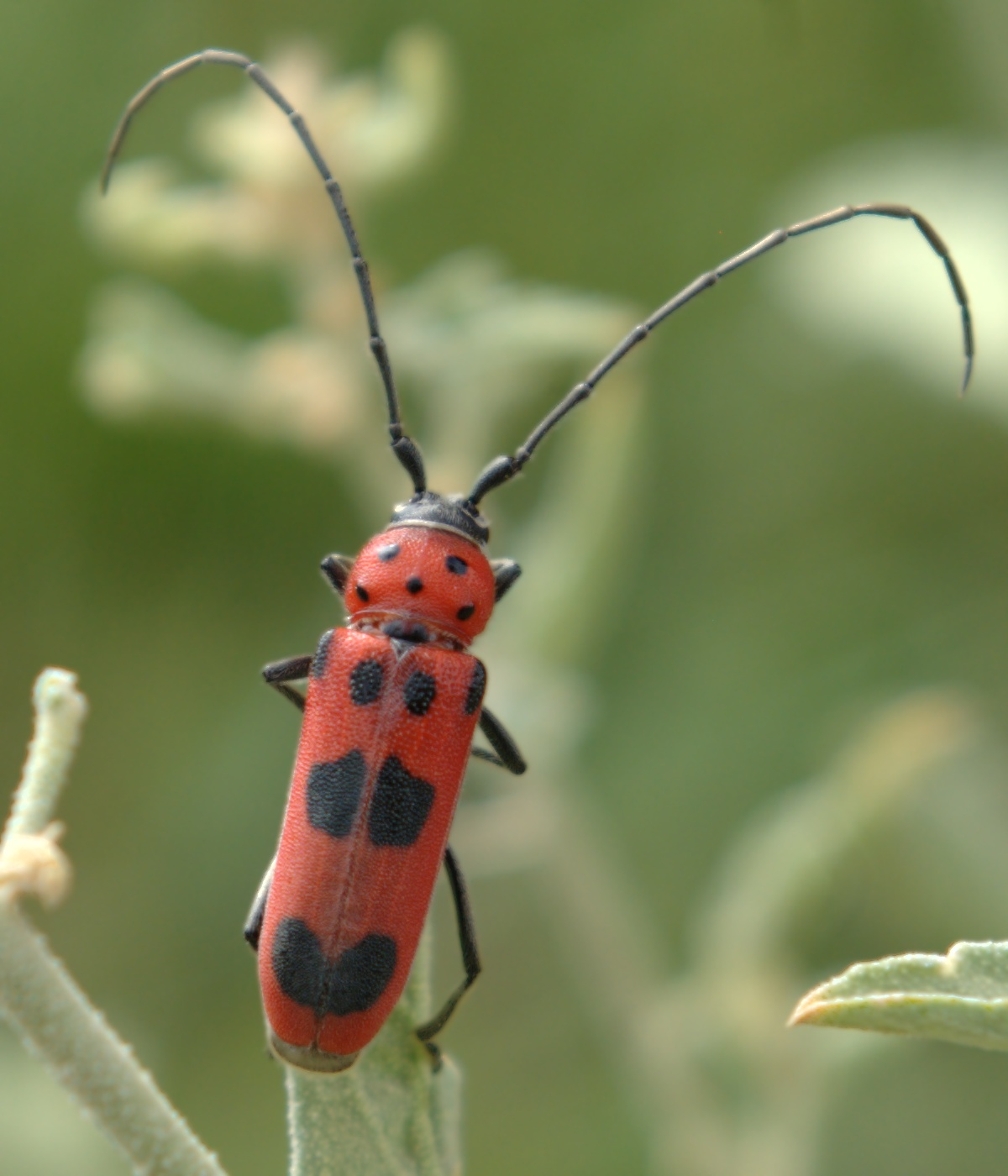
- Tylosis maculatus

Scientific classification
- Kingdom: Animalia
- Phylum: Arthropoda
- Class: Insecta
- Order: Coleoptera
- Suborder: Polyphaga
- Infraorder: Cucujiformia
- Family: Cerambycidae
- Subfamily: Cerambycinae
- Tribe: Trachyderini
- Genus: Tylosis; LeConte, 1850

= Tylosis (beetle) =

Genus of beetles

Tylosis is a genus of beetles in the family Cerambycidae, containing the following species:

- Tylosis dimidiata Bates, 1892
- Tylosis hilaris Linsley, 1957
- Tylosis jimenezii Dugès, 1879
- Tylosis maculatus LeConte, 1850
- Tylosis nigricollis Chemsak & Hovore, in Eya, 2010
- Tylosis oculatus LeConte, 1850
- Tylosis puncticollis Bates, 1885
- Tylosis suturalis White, 1853
- Tylosis triangularis Monné & Martins, 1981
