= Rhomboid protease =

Rhomboid
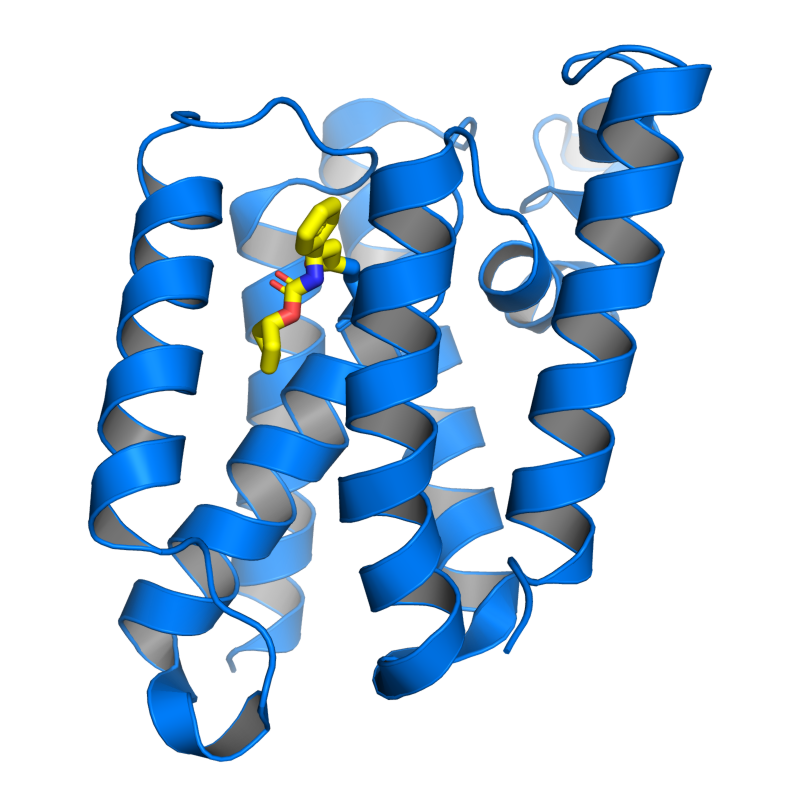
- Escherichia coli rhomboid protease GlpG in complex with a beta-lactam inhibitor (yellow) bound to the catalytic serine residue. From PDB: 3ZMH.

Identifiers
- Symbol: Rhomboid
- Pfam: PF01694
- Pfam clan: CL0207
- InterPro: IPR002610
- MEROPS: S54
- SCOP2: 144092 / SCOPe / SUPFAM
- OPM superfamily: 165
- OPM protein: 2ic8
Available protein structures:
- PDB: IPR002610 PF01694 (ECOD; PDBsum)
- AlphaFold: IPR002610; PF01694

The rhomboid proteases are a family of enzymes that exist in almost all species. They are proteases: they cut the polypeptide chain of other proteins. This proteolytic cleavage is irreversible in cells, and an important type of cellular regulation. Although proteases are one of the earliest and best studied class of enzyme, rhomboids belong to a much more recently discovered type: the intramembrane proteases. What is unique about intramembrane proteases is that their active sites are buried in the lipid bilayer of cell membranes, and they cleave other transmembrane proteins within their transmembrane domains. About 30% of all proteins have transmembrane domains, and their regulated processing often has major biological consequences. Accordingly, rhomboids regulate many important cellular processes, and may be involved in a wide range of human diseases.

== Intramembrane proteases ==
Rhomboids are intramembrane serine proteases. The other types of intramembrane protease are aspartyl- and metallo-proteases, respectively. The presenilins and signal peptide peptidase-like family, which are intramembrane aspartyl proteases, cleave substrates that include the Notch receptor and the amyloid precursor protein, which is implicated in Alzheimer's disease. The site-2 protease family, which are intramembrane metalloproteases, regulate among other things cholesterol biosynthesis and stress responses in bacteria. The different intramembrane protease families are evolutionarily and mechanistically unrelated, but there are clear common functional themes that link them. Rhomboids are perhaps the best characterised class.

== History ==
Rhomboids were first named after a mutation in the fruit fly Drosophila, discovered in a famous genetic screen that led to a Nobel Prize for Christiane Nüsslein-Volhard and Eric Wieschaus. In that screen they found a number of mutants with similar phenotypes: 'pointy' embryonic head skeletons. They named them each with a pointy-themed name – one was rhomboid. At first this was noticed because a mutation disrupted development, genetic analysis later proved that this group of genes were members of the epidermal growth factor (EGF) receptor signalling pathway, and that rhomboid was needed to generate the signal that activates the EGF receptor. The molecular function of rhomboid took a bit longer to unravel but a combination of genetics and molecular techniques led to the discovery that Drosophila rhomboid and other members of the family were the first known intramembrane serine proteases.

== Function ==
Rhomboids were first discovered as proteases that regulate EGF receptor signalling in Drosophila. By releasing the extracellular domain of the growth factor Spitz, from its transmembrane precursor, rhomboid triggers signalling. Since then, many other important biological functions have been proposed.

- Later, Drosophilas' Rhomboid-1 was shown to regulate sleep, through a new function of an already-discovered mechanism.
- Although less well established than in Drosophila, there is some evidence that rhomboids may participate in growth factor signalling in mammals, including humans. They have also been implicated in ephrin signalling, the cleavage of the anticoagulant protein thrombomodulin and wound healing.
- All eukaryotes have a mitochondrial rhomboid. In yeast this has been shown to control mitochondrial function and morphology by regulating membrane fusion via the cleavage of a dynamin-like GTPase called Mgm1p, the orthologue of human OPA1. In Drosophila, the mitochondrial rhomboid (Rhomboid-7) also regulates mitochondrial membrane fusion. Drosophila Opa1 and Rhomboid-7 appear to have the same relationship as in yeast. In mammals too, mitochondrial function is disrupted in mutants of PARL, the mitochondrial rhomboid, but the range of functions is more complex. PARL regulates the remodelling of mitochondrial cristae, is implicated in cell death and metabolism, and there is increasing evidence of an important role in Parkinson's disease;
- Apicomplexan parasites (including Plasmodium, the agent that causes malaria, and Toxoplasma) rhomboids are used to reposition between attachment to a target cell and entry, and most microneme-produced adhesins are released from the microneme by rhomboids. Rhomboids have also been implicated in the pathogenicity of other parasites. In Toxoplasma specifically, some serpins inhibit rhomboids.
- A rhomboid in the Gram-negative bacterium Providencia stuartii is required for the function of the twin-arginine protein translocation (TAT) machinery.
- Rhomboids control EGF receptor signaling in Caenorhabditis elegans as in Drosophila.

== Structure ==
Rhomboids were the first intramembrane proteases for which a high resolution crystal structure was solved. These structures confirmed predictions that rhomboids have a core of six transmembrane domains, and that the catalytic site depends on a serine and histidine catalytic dyad. The structures also explained how a proteolytic reaction, which requires water molecules, can occur in the hydrophobic environment of a lipid bilayer: one of the central mysteries of intramembrane proteases. The active site of rhomboid protease is in a hydrophilic indentation, in principle accessible to water from the bulk solution. However, it has been proposed that there might be an auxiliary mechanism to facilitate access of water molecules to the catalytic dyad at the bottom of the active site to ensure catalytic efficiency.

The active site of rhomboid protease is protected laterally from the lipid bilayer by its six constituent transmembrane helices, suggesting that substrate access to rhomboid active site is regulated. One area of uncertainty has been the route of substrate access. Substrates were initially proposed to enter between transmembrane segments (TMSs) 1 and 3, but current evidence strongly supports an alternative access point, between TMSs 2 and 5. This notion is also supported by the fact that mutations in TMS 5 have only a marginal effect on the thermodynamic stability of rhomboid, unlike other regions of the molecule. Very recently, the first ever co-crystal structure of an intramembrane protease – Escherichia coli's version of the rhomboid protease GlpG – and a substrate-derived peptide bound in the active site confirms and extends this substrate access model and provides implications for the mechanism of other rhomboid-superfamily proteins. E. coli's GlpG is unusual for its low enzyme/substrate binding affinity. The details of how a substrate TMS may be recognized by rhomboid are however still unclear. Some authors propose that substrate access involves a large lateral displacement movement of TMS 5 to open up the core of rhomboid. Other reports instead suggest that large lateral movement of TMS 5 is not required, and propose that the surface of TMSs 2 and 5 rather serves as an "intramembrane exosite" mediating the recognition of substrate TMS. The rhomboid ortholog in D. suzukii is Dsuz\DS10_00004507.

== Enzymatic specificity ==
Rhomboids do not cleave all transmembrane domains. In fact, they are highly specific, with a limited number of substrates. Most natural Rhomboid substrates known so far are type 1 single transmembrane domain proteins, with their amino termini in the luminal/extracellular compartment. However, recent studies suggested that type 2 membrane protein (i.e. with opposite topology: the amino terminus is cytoplasmic), or even multipass membrane proteins could act as rhomboid substrates. The specificity of rhomboids underlies their ability to control functions in a wide range of biological processes and, in turn, understanding what makes a particular transmembrane domain into a rhomboid substrate can shed light on rhomboid function in different contexts.

Initial work indicated that rhomboids recognise instability of the transmembrane alpha-helix at the site of cleavage as the main substrate determinant. More recently, it has been found that rhomboid substrates are defined by two separable elements: the transmembrane domain and a primary sequence motif in or immediately adjacent to it. This recognition motif directs where the substrate is cleaved, which can occur either within, or just outside, the transmembrane domain, in the juxtamembrane region. In the former case helix destabilising residues downstream in substrate TMS are also necessary for efficient cleavage. A detailed enzyme kinetics analysis has in fact shown that the recognition motif interactions with rhomboid active site determine the k_{cat} of substrate cleavage. The principles of substrate TMS recognition by rhomboid remain poorly understood, but numerous lines of evidence indicate that rhomboids (and perhaps also other intramembrane proteases) somehow recognise the structural flexibility or dynamics of transmembrane domain of their substrates. Full appreciation of the biophysical and structural principles involved will require structural characterisation of the complex of rhomboid with the full transmembrane substrate. As a first step towards this goal, a recent co-crystal structure of the enzyme in complex with a substrate-derived peptide containing mechanism-based inhibitor explains the observed recognition motif sequence preferences in rhomboid substrates structurally, and provides a significant advance in the current understanding of rhomboid specificity and mechanism of rhomboid-family proteins.

In some Gram-negative bacteria, including Shewanella and Vibrio, up to thirteen proteins are found with GlyGly-CTERM, a C-terminal homology domain consisting of a glycine-rich motif, a highly hydrophobic transmembrane helix, and a cluster of basic residues. This domain appears to be the recognition sequence for rhombosortase, a branch of the rhomboid protease family limited to just those bacteria with the GlyGly-CTERM domain.

== Medical significance ==
The diversity of biological functions already known to depend on rhomboids is reflected in evidence that rhomboids play a role in a variety of diseases including cancer, parasite infection, and diabetes. There is no case yet established where a precise medical significance is fully validated.

No drugs that modulate rhomboid activity have yet been reported, although a recent study has identified small molecule, mechanism-based inhibitors that could provide a basis for future drug development.

== Rhomboid-like family ==
Rhomboid proteases appear to be conserved in all eukaryotes and the vast majority of prokaryotes. Bioinformatic analysis highlights that some members of the rhomboid family lack the amino acid residues essential for proteolysis, implying that they cannot cleave substrates. These 'pseudoproteases' include a subfamily that have been named the iRhoms (also known as RHBDF1 and RHBDF2). iRhoms can promote the ER associated degradation (ERAD) of EGF receptor ligands in Drosophila, thus providing a mechanism for regulating EGF receptor activity in the brain. This implies that the fundamental cellular quality control mechanism is exploited by multicellular organisms to regulate signalling between cells. In mice, iRhoms are key trafficking chaperones required for the ER export of ADAM17/TACE and its maturation. iRhoms are thus required for the TNF-alpha and EGF receptor signalling, making them medically highly attractive.

Phylogenetic analysis indicates that rhomboids are in fact members of a larger rhomboid-like superfamily or clan, which includes the derlin proteins, also involved in ERAD.

Kinetoplastids have an unusually small rhomboid family repertoire, in Trypanosoma brucei XP 001561764 and XP 001561544, and in T. cruzi XP 805971, XP 802860, and XP 821055.

Various rhomboid family proteins are vital to Toxoplasma gondii virulence and motility, including TgMIC2, TgMIC6, various AMA1 variants including TgAMA1, TgROM1, TgROM4, and TgROM5.

Trypanosome mitochondria have TimRhom I and TimRhom II (two rhomboid family members with proteolytic function deactivated) in their presequence translocases. The difficulty in finding greater similarity either to eukaryotic or bacterial relatives may mean these came as part of the original mitochondrial progenitor. Rhomboid-relatives may be membrane transport proteins in the ERAD and SELMA systems.

=== iRhoms ===
iRhoms are rhomboid-like proteins, that are not proteases. As with rhomboids they were first discovered in Drosophilae. Some iRhoms inhibit EGFr signaling. Knockout mice for iRhom2 are severely immune compromised.
