= Esophageal stent =

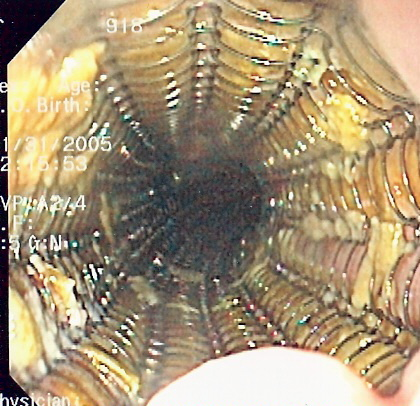
- Esophageal stent

An esophageal stent is a stent (tube) placed in the esophagus to keep a blocked area open so the patient can swallow soft food and liquids. They are effective in the treatment of conditions causing intrinsic esophageal obstruction or external esophageal compression. For the palliative treatment of esophageal cancer most esophageal stents are self-expandable metallic stents. For benign esophageal disease such as refractory esophageal strictures, plastic stents are available. Common complications include chest pain, overgrowth of tissue around the stent and stent migration. Esophageal stents may also be used to staunch the bleeding of esophageal varices.

Esophageal stents are placed using endoscopy when after the tip of the endoscope is positioned above the area to be stented, then guidewire is passed through the obstruction into the stomach. The endoscope is withdrawn and using the guidewire with either fluoroscopic or endoscopic guidance the stent is passed down the guidewire to the affected area of the esophagus and deployed. Finally, the guidewire is removed and the stent is left to fully expand over the next 2–3 days.

In one study of 997 patients who had self-expanding metal stents for malignant esophageal obstruction it was found that esophageal stents were 95% effective.

Pros of Esophageal Stent

There are several potential benefits of an esophageal stent procedure:

1. Symptoms relief: stents can help by alleviating symptoms e.g. swallowing, chest pain, and weight loss caused by a narrowed or blocked esophagus.
2. Fast Results: Normally performed in a day and quick recovery.
3. Minor invasive: When using an endoscope, it makes the procedure less invasive than some other treatments.
4. Palliative care: Stents help patients with advanced esophageal cancer by relieving symptoms and improving the quality of life.
5. Alternative to surgery: For older and less healthy patients, an esophageal stent is a viable alternative to surgery,

Cons of Esophageal Stent

There are also several potential drawbacks to an esophageal stent procedure:

1. Complications: Bleeding, infection, and perforation of the esophagus may occur.
2. Stent migration: Stent may move causing symptoms to recur or lead to other complications.
3. Stent obstruction: Blockage can occur, repeating symptoms or other complications.
4. Stent related pain: Chest or throat pain may occur after the procedure; requiring additional treatment or adjustment of the stent.
5. Stent removal: Check with your doctor on the stent type used for the procedure. Ask if it may need to be removed at a later date and the process and issues that may come about as a result.

== Additional images ==
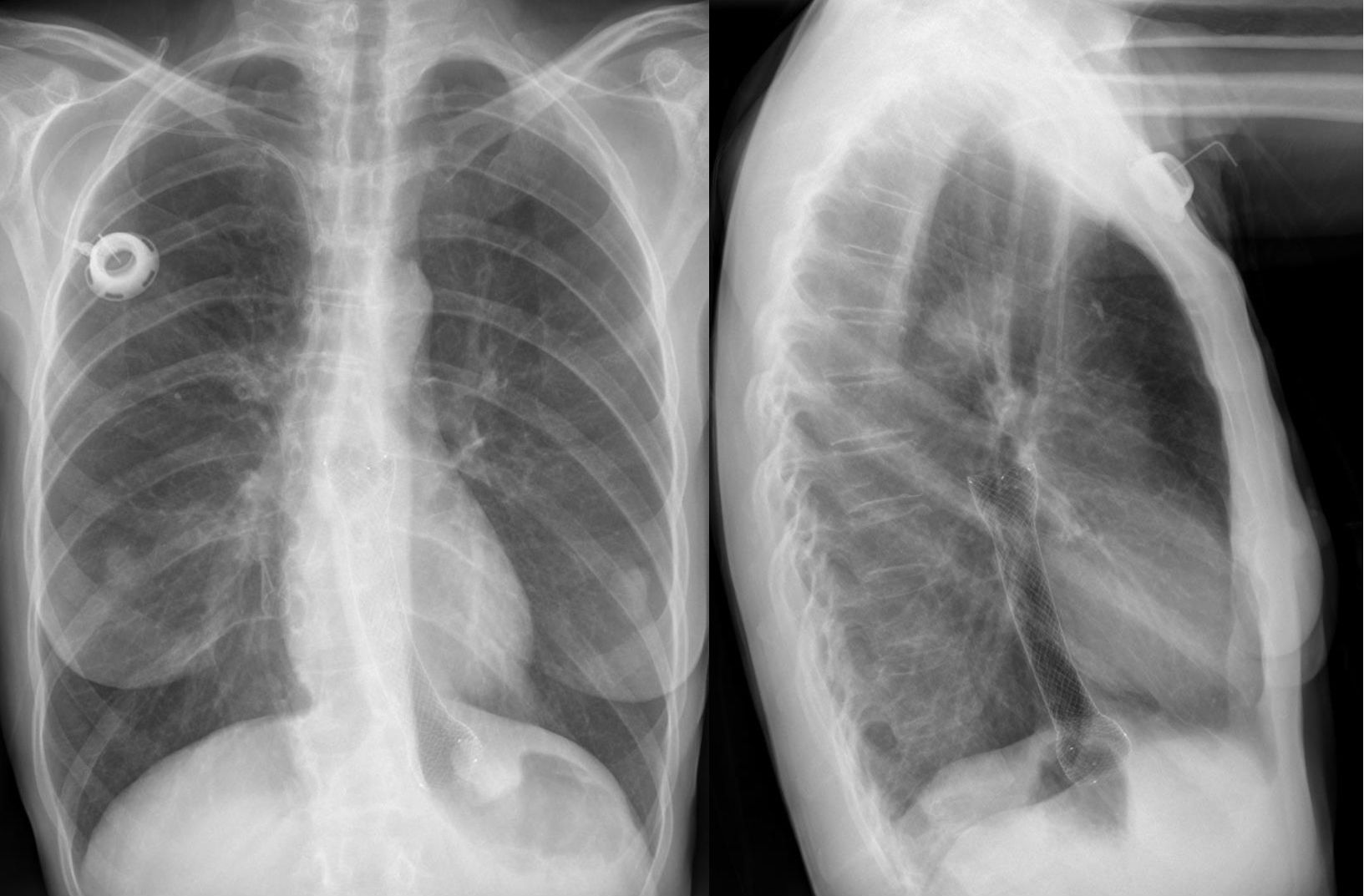
Chest radiograph showing a stent in the distal esophagus
