= Proteolysis =

Breakdown of proteins into smaller polypeptides or amino acids

The hydrolysis of a protein (red) by the nucleophilic attack of water (blue). The uncatalysed half-life is several hundred years.

Proteolysis is the breakdown of proteins into smaller polypeptides or amino acids. Protein degradation is a major regulatory mechanism of gene expression and contributes substantially to shaping mammalian proteomes. Uncatalysed, the hydrolysis of peptide bonds is extremely slow, taking hundreds of years. Proteolysis is typically catalysed by cellular enzymes called proteases, but may also occur by intra-molecular digestion.

Proteolysis in organisms serves many purposes; for example, digestive enzymes break down proteins in food to provide amino acids for the organism, while proteolytic processing of a polypeptide chain after its synthesis may be necessary for the production of an active protein. It is also important in the regulation of some physiological and cellular processes including apoptosis, as well as preventing the accumulation of unwanted or misfolded proteins in cells. Consequently, abnormality in the regulation of proteolysis can cause diseases.

Proteolysis can also be used as an analytical tool for studying proteins in the laboratory, and it may also be used in industry, for example in food processing and stain removal.

== Biological functions ==
=== Post-translational proteolytic processing ===
Limited proteolysis of a polypeptide during or after translation in protein synthesis often occurs for many proteins. This may involve removal of the N-terminal methionine, signal peptide, and/or the conversion of an inactive or non-functional protein to an active one. The precursor to the final functional form of protein is termed proprotein, and these proproteins may be first synthesized as preproprotein. For example, albumin is first synthesized as preproalbumin and contains an uncleaved signal peptide. This forms the proalbumin after the signal peptide is cleaved, and a further processing to remove the N-terminal 6-residue propeptide yields the mature form of the protein.

==== Removal of N-terminal methionine ====
The initiating methionine (and, in bacteria, fMet) may be removed during translation of the nascent protein. For E. coli, fMet is efficiently removed if the second residue is small and uncharged, but not if the second residue is bulky and charged. In both prokaryotes and eukaryotes, the exposed N-terminal residue may determine the half-life of the protein according to the N-end rule.

==== Removal of the signal sequence ====
Proteins that are to be targeted to a particular organelle or for secretion have an N-terminal signal peptide that directs the protein to its final destination. This signal peptide is removed by proteolysis after their transport through a membrane.

==== Cleavage of polyproteins ====
Some proteins and most eukaryotic polypeptide hormones are synthesized as a large precursor polypeptide known as a polyprotein that requires proteolytic cleavage into individual smaller polypeptide chains. The polyprotein pro-opiomelanocortin (POMC) contains many polypeptide hormones. The cleavage pattern of POMC, however, may vary between different tissues, yielding different sets of polypeptide hormones from the same polyprotein.

Many viruses also produce their proteins initially as a single polypeptide chain that were translated from a polycistronic mRNA. This polypeptide is subsequently cleaved into individual polypeptide chains. Common names for the polyprotein include gag (group-specific antigen) in retroviruses and ORF1ab in Nidovirales. The latter name refers to the fact that a slippery sequence in the mRNA that codes for the polypeptide causes ribosomal frameshifting, leading to two different lengths of peptidic chains (a and ab) at an approximately fixed ratio.

==== Cleavage of precursor proteins ====
Many proteins and hormones are synthesized in the form of their precursors - zymogens, proenzymes, and prehormones. These proteins are cleaved to form their final active structures. Insulin, for example, is synthesized as preproinsulin, which yields proinsulin after the signal peptide has been cleaved. The proinsulin is then cleaved at two positions to yield two polypeptide chains linked by two disulfide bonds. Removal of two C-terminal residues from the B-chain then yields the mature insulin. Protein folding occurs in the single-chain proinsulin form which facilitates formation of the ultimate inter-peptide disulfide bonds, and the ultimate intra-peptide disulfide bond, found in the native structure of insulin.

Proteases in particular are synthesized in the inactive form so that they may be safely stored in cells, and ready for release in sufficient quantity when required. This is to ensure that the protease is activated only in the correct location or context, as inappropriate activation of these proteases can be very destructive for an organism. Proteolysis of the zymogen yields an active protein; for example, when trypsinogen is cleaved to form trypsin, a slight rearrangement of the protein structure that completes the active site of the protease occurs, thereby activating the protein.

Proteolysis can, therefore, be a method of regulating biological processes by turning inactive proteins into active ones. A good example is the blood clotting cascade whereby an initial event triggers a cascade of sequential proteolytic activation of many specific proteases, resulting in blood coagulation. The complement system of the immune response also involves a complex sequential proteolytic activation and interaction that result in an attack on invading pathogens.

=== Protein degradation ===
Protein degradation may take place intracellularly or extracellularly. In digestion of food, digestive enzymes may be released into the environment for extracellular digestion whereby proteolytic cleavage breaks proteins into smaller peptides and amino acids so that they may be absorbed and used. In animals the food may be processed extracellularly in specialized organs or guts, but in many bacteria the food may be internalized via phagocytosis. Microbial degradation of protein in the environment can be regulated by nutrient availability. For example, limitation for major elements in proteins (carbon, nitrogen, and sulfur) induces proteolytic activity in the fungus Neurospora crassa as well as in of soil organism communities.

Proteins in cells are broken into amino acids. This intracellular degradation of protein serves multiple functions: It removes damaged and abnormal proteins and prevents their accumulation. It also serves to regulate cellular processes by removing enzymes and regulatory proteins that are no longer needed. The amino acids may then be reused for protein synthesis.

==== Lysosome and proteasome ====
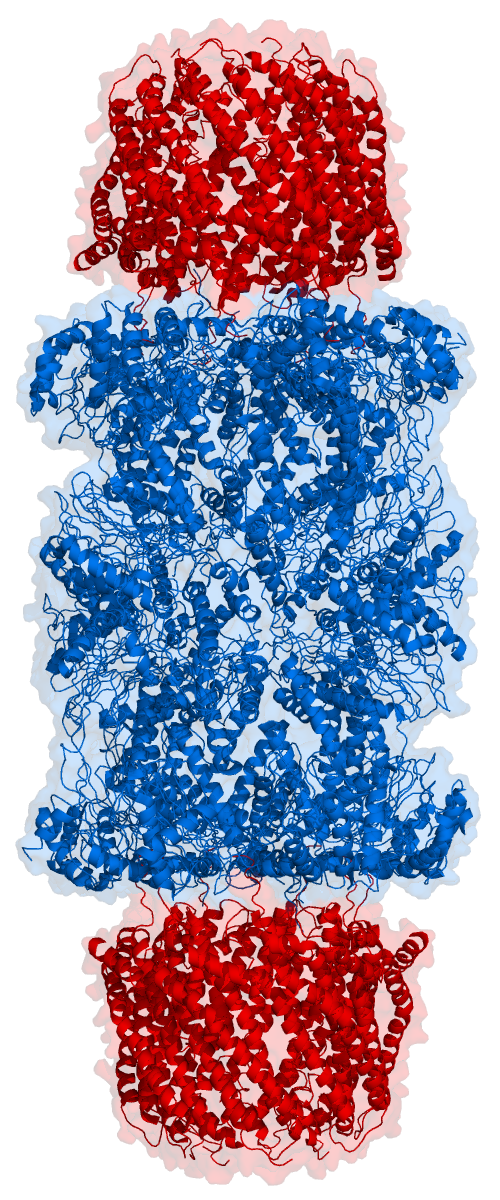
Structure of a proteasome. Its active sites are inside the tube (blue) where proteins are degraded.

The intracellular degradation of protein may be achieved in two ways—proteolysis in lysosome, or a ubiquitin-dependent process that targets unwanted proteins to proteasome. The autophagy-lysosomal pathway is normally a non-selective process, but it may become selective upon starvation whereby proteins with peptide sequence KFERQ or similar are selectively broken down. The lysosome contains a large number of proteases such as cathepsins.

The ubiquitin-mediated process is selective. Proteins marked for degradation are covalently linked to ubiquitin. Many molecules of ubiquitin may be linked in tandem to a protein destined for degradation. The polyubiquinated protein is targeted to an ATP-dependent protease complex, the proteasome. The ubiquitin is released and reused, while the targeted protein is degraded.

==== Rate of intracellular protein degradation ====
Different proteins are degraded at different rates. Abnormal proteins are quickly degraded, whereas the rate of degradation of normal proteins may vary widely depending on their functions. Enzymes at important metabolic control points may be degraded much faster than those enzymes whose activity is largely constant under all physiological conditions. One of the most rapidly degraded proteins is ornithine decarboxylase, which has a half-life of 11 minutes. In contrast, other proteins like actin and myosin have a half-life of a month or more, while, in essence, haemoglobin lasts for the entire life-time of an erythrocyte.

The N-end rule may partially determine the half-life of a protein, and proteins with segments rich in proline, glutamic acid, serine, and threonine (the so-called PEST proteins) have short half-life. Other factors suspected to affect degradation rate include the rate deamination of glutamine and asparagine and oxidation of cystein, histidine, and methionine, the absence of stabilizing ligands, the presence of attached carbohydrate or phosphate groups, the presence of free α-amino group, the negative charge of protein, and the flexibility and stability of the protein. Proteins with larger degrees of intrinsic disorder also tend to have short cellular half-life, with disordered segments having been proposed to facilitate efficient initiation of degradation by the proteasome.

The rate of proteolysis may also depend on the physiological state of the organism, such as its hormonal state as well as nutritional status. In time of starvation, the rate of protein degradation increases.

==== Digestion ====
In human digestion, proteins in food are broken down into smaller peptide chains by digestive enzymes such as pepsin, trypsin, chymotrypsin, and elastase, and into amino acids by various enzymes such as carboxypeptidase, aminopeptidase, and dipeptidase. It is necessary to break down proteins into small peptides (tripeptides and dipeptides) and amino acids so they can be absorbed by the intestines, and the absorbed tripeptides and dipeptides are also further broken into amino acids intracellularly before they enter the bloodstream. Different enzymes have different specificity for their substrate; trypsin, for example, cleaves the peptide bond after a positively charged residue (arginine and lysine); chymotrypsin cleaves the bond after an aromatic residue (phenylalanine, tyrosine, and tryptophan); elastase cleaves the bond after a small non-polar residue such as alanine or glycine.

In order to prevent inappropriate or premature activation of the digestive enzymes (they may, for example, trigger pancreatic self-digestion causing pancreatitis), these enzymes are secreted as inactive zymogen. The precursor of pepsin, pepsinogen, is secreted by the stomach, and is activated only in the acidic environment found in stomach. The pancreas secretes the precursors of a number of proteases such as trypsin and chymotrypsin. The zymogen of trypsin is trypsinogen, which is activated by a very specific protease, enterokinase, secreted by the mucosa of the duodenum. The trypsin, once activated, can also cleave other trypsinogens as well as the precursors of other proteases such as chymotrypsin and carboxypeptidase to activate them.

In bacteria, a similar strategy of employing an inactive zymogen or prezymogen is used. Subtilisin, which is produced by Bacillus subtilis, is produced as preprosubtilisin, and is released only if the signal peptide is cleaved and autocatalytic proteolytic activation has occurred.

=== Cellular regulation ===
Proteolysis is also involved in the regulation of many cellular processes by activating or deactivating enzymes, transcription factors, and receptors, for example in the biosynthesis of cholesterol, or the mediation of thrombin signalling through protease-activated receptors.

Some enzymes at important metabolic control points such as ornithine decarboxylase is regulated entirely by its rate of synthesis and its rate of degradation. Other rapidly degraded proteins include the protein products of proto-oncogenes, which play central roles in the regulation of cell growth.

==== Cell cycle regulation ====
Cyclins are a group of proteins that activate kinases involved in cell division. The degradation of cyclins is the key step that governs the exit from mitosis and progress into the next cell cycle. Cyclins accumulate in the course the cell cycle, then abruptly disappear just before the anaphase of mitosis. The cyclins are removed via a ubiquitin-mediated proteolytic pathway.

==== Apoptosis ====
Caspases are an important group of proteases involved in apoptosis or programmed cell death. The precursors of caspase, procaspase, may be activated by proteolysis through its association with a protein complex that forms apoptosome, or by granzyme B, or via the death receptor pathways.

== Autoproteolysis ==
Autoproteolysis takes place in some proteins, whereby the peptide bond is cleaved in a self-catalyzed intramolecular reaction. Unlike zymogens, these autoproteolytic proteins participate in a "single turnover" reaction and do not catalyze further reactions post-cleavage. Examples include cleavage of the Asp-Pro bond in a subset of von Willebrand factor type D (VWD) domains and Neisseria meningitidis FrpC self-processing domain, cleavage of the Asn-Pro bond in Salmonella FlhB protein, Yersinia YscU protein, as well as cleavage of the Gly-Ser bond in a subset of sea urchin sperm protein, enterokinase, and agrin (SEA) domains. In some cases, the autoproteolytic cleavage is promoted by conformational strain of the peptide bond.

== Proteolysis and diseases ==
Abnormal proteolytic activity is associated with many diseases. In pancreatitis, leakage of proteases and their premature activation in the pancreas results in the self-digestion of the pancreas. People with diabetes mellitus may have increased lysosomal activity and the degradation of some proteins can increase significantly. Chronic inflammatory diseases such as rheumatoid arthritis may involve the release of lysosomal enzymes into extracellular space that break down surrounding tissues. Abnormal proteolysis may result in age-related neurological diseases such as Alzheimer's disease due to the generation and ineffective removal of peptides that aggregate in cells.

Proteases may be regulated by antiproteases or protease inhibitors, and imbalance between proteases and antiproteases can result in diseases, for example, in the destruction of lung tissues in emphysema brought on by smoking tobacco. Smoking is thought to increase the neutrophils and macrophages in the lung which release excessive amount of proteolytic enzymes such as elastase, such that they can no longer be inhibited by serpins such as α_{1}-antitrypsin, thereby resulting in the breaking down of connective tissues in the lung. Other proteases and their inhibitors may also be involved in this disease, for example matrix metalloproteinases (MMPs) and tissue inhibitors of metalloproteinases (TIMPs).

Other diseases linked to aberrant proteolysis include muscular dystrophy, degenerative skin disorders, respiratory and gastrointestinal diseases, and malignancy.

== Non-enzymatic processes ==
Protein backbones are very stable in water at neutral pH and room temperature, although the rate of hydrolysis of different peptide bonds can vary. The half-life of a peptide bond under normal conditions can range from 7 years to 350 years, even higher for peptides protected by modified terminus or within the protein interior. The rate of hydrolysis however can be significantly increased by extremes of pH and heat. Spontaneous cleavage of proteins may also involve catalysis by zinc on serine and threonine.

Strong mineral acids can readily hydrolyse the peptide bonds in a protein (acid hydrolysis). The standard way to hydrolyze a protein or peptide into its constituent amino acids for analysis is to heat it to 105 °C for around 24 hours in 6M hydrochloric acid. However, some proteins are resistant to acid hydrolysis. One well-known example is ribonuclease A, which can be purified by treating crude extracts with hot sulfuric acid so that other proteins become degraded while ribonuclease A is left intact.

Certain chemicals cause proteolysis only after specific residues, and these can be used to selectively break down a protein into smaller polypeptides for laboratory analysis. For example, cyanogen bromide cleaves the peptide bond after a methionine. Similar methods may be used to specifically cleave tryptophanyl, aspartyl, cysteinyl, and asparaginyl peptide bonds. Acids such as trifluoroacetic acid and formic acid may be used for cleavage.

Like other biomolecules, proteins can also be broken down by high heat alone. At 250 °C, the peptide bond may be easily hydrolyzed, with its half-life dropping to about a minute. Protein may also be broken down without hydrolysis through pyrolysis; small heterocyclic compounds may start to form upon degradation. Above 500 °C, polycyclic aromatic hydrocarbons may also form, which is of interest in the study of generation of carcinogens in tobacco smoke and cooking at high heat.

== Laboratory applications ==
Proteolysis is also used in research and diagnostic applications:

- Cleavage of fusion protein so that the fusion partner and protein tag used in protein expression and purification may be removed. The proteases used have high degree of specificity, such as thrombin, enterokinase, and TEV protease, so that only the targeted sequence may be cleaved.
- Complete inactivation of undesirable enzymatic activity or removal of unwanted proteins. For example, proteinase K, a broad-spectrum proteinase stable in urea and SDS, is often used in the preparation of nucleic acids to remove unwanted nuclease contaminants that may otherwise degrade the DNA or RNA.
- Partial inactivation, or changing the functionality, of specific protein. For example, treatment of DNA polymerase I with subtilisin yields the Klenow fragment, which retains its polymerase function but lacks 5'-exonuclease activity.
- Digestion of proteins in solution for proteome analysis by liquid chromatography-mass spectrometry (LC-MS). This may also be done by in-gel digestion of proteins after separation by gel electrophoresis for the identification by mass spectrometry.
- Analysis of the stability of folded domain under a wide range of conditions.
- Increasing success rate of crystallisation projects
- Production of digested protein used in growth media to culture bacteria and other organisms, e.g. tryptone in Lysogeny Broth.

== Protease enzymes ==
Proteases may be classified according to the catalytic group involved in its active site.

- Cysteine protease
- Serine protease
- Threonine protease
- Aspartic protease
- Glutamic protease
- Metalloprotease
- Asparagine peptide lyase

=== Venoms ===
Certain types of venom, such as those produced by venomous snakes, can also cause proteolysis. These venoms are, in fact, complex digestive fluids that begin their work outside of the body. Proteolytic venoms cause a wide range of toxic effects, including effects that are:

- Cytotoxic (cell-destroying)
- Hemotoxic (blood-destroying)
- Myotoxic (muscle-destroying)
- Hemorrhagic (bleeding)

== See also ==
- The Proteolysis Map
- PROTOMAP a proteomic technology for identifying proteolytic substrates
