= Chronic pancreatitis =

- Other names: Pancreatitis – chronic – discharge
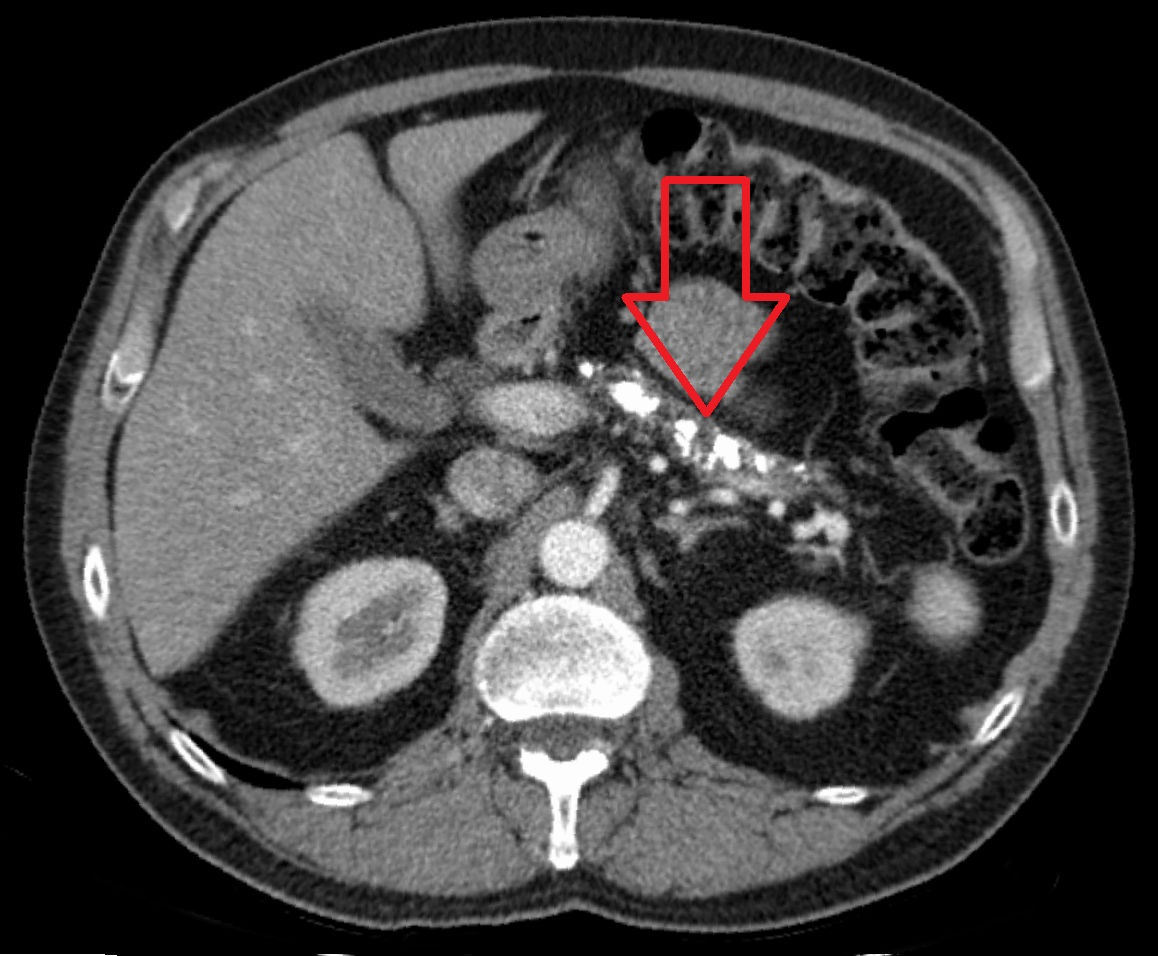
- Axial CT showing multiple calcifications in the pancreas in a patient with chronic pancreatitis
- Specialty: Gastroenterology
- Symptoms: Nausea and vomiting
- Complications: Exocrine pancreatic insufficiency, endocrine pancreatic insufficiency (Type 3c diabetes), pancreatic pseudocyst, pancreatic cancer, vitamin deficiency (fat-soluble vitamins)
- Causes: Alcohol(ism), immune disorder
- Diagnostic method: Serum trypsinogen, fecal fat test
- Treatment: Pain medicines, avoiding alcohol (and smoking), among other possible management efforts
- Frequency: 50 per 100,000 persons (prevalence)

Chronic pancreatitis is a long-standing inflammation of the pancreas that alters the organ's normal structure and functions. It can present as episodes of acute inflammation in a previously injured pancreas, or as chronic damage with persistent pain or malabsorption. It is a disease process characterized by irreversible damage to the pancreas as distinct from reversible changes in acute pancreatitis. Tobacco smoke and alcohol misuse are two of the most frequently implicated causes, and the two risk factors are thought to have a synergistic effect with regard to the development of chronic pancreatitis. Chronic pancreatitis is a risk factor for the development of pancreatic cancer.

== Signs and symptoms ==
Symptoms are as follows:

- Upper abdominal pain: Upper abdominal pain which increases after drinking or eating, lessens when fasting or sitting and leaning forward. Some people may not suffer pain.
- Nausea and vomiting
- Steatorrhea: Frequent, oily, foul-smelling bowel movements. Damage to the pancreas can reduce the production of pancreatic enzymes that aid digestion, causing exocrine pancreatic insufficiency. Fats and nutrients are not absorbed properly, leading to loose, greasy stool. It can also lead to malnutrition.
- Weight loss even when eating habits and amounts are normal.
- Type 3c diabetes (pancreatogenic diabetes): Chronic pancreatitis can affect the ability of the pancreatic islets to produce insulin to regulate glucose levels, leading to diabetes type 3c. Symptoms of diabetes type 3c are due to elevated sugar and may include increased hunger and thirst, frequent urination, weight loss, fatigue, and blurry vision.
- Bone diseases: Chronic pancreatitis is associated with an increased risk of osteopathy, including osteoporosis and osteopenia. Malnutrition, inflammation, and lifestyle factors contribute to the high prevalence of bone disorders in chronic pancreatitis patients.

There have been three pain symptom profiles described in those with chronic pancreatitis. Type A involves intermittent, severe symptom flare-ups with or without objective pancreatitis, separated by pain-free periods. The type A symptom profile is usually more common early in the course of chronic pancreatitis. Type B chronic pancreatitis involves chronic pain accompanied by intermittent severe attacks. The type C symptom profile of chronic pancreatitis involves chronic, long-term, severe pain without interspersed acute flare-ups or symptom exacerbations.

== Causes ==
Among the causes of chronic pancreatitis are the following:

- Alcohol
- Autoimmune disorders
- Intraductal obstruction
- Idiopathic pancreatitis
- Tumors
- Ischemia
- Calcific stones

Chronic alcohol misuse and smoking are well-established risk factors for the development of chronic pancreatitis, and the two are thought to have a synergistic effect with regard to disease development. Alcohol use is present in 42–77% of those who have chronic pancreatitis, and tobacco use is present in greater than 60% of those with chronic pancreatitis. Genetic mutations are thought to be responsible for 10% of cases. This includes mutations of the cystic fibrosis transmembrane conductance regulator (CFTR), serine protease inhibitor Kazal-type 1 (SPINK1), and the chymotrypsin C (CTRC) proteins. 28% of cases of chronic pancreatitis are idiopathic (of an unknown cause). In a small group of patients, chronic pancreatitis has been shown to be hereditary. Hereditary pancreatitis, which causes 1% of chronic pancreatitis, involves a mutation of the trypsin-1 gene that is inherited in an autosomal dominant fashion. Almost all patients with cystic fibrosis have established chronic pancreatitis, usually from birth. Cystic fibrosis gene mutations have also been identified in patients with chronic pancreatitis but in whom there were no other manifestations of cystic fibrosis. Obstruction of the pancreatic duct because of either a benign or malignant process may result in chronic pancreatitis.

== Pathophysiology ==
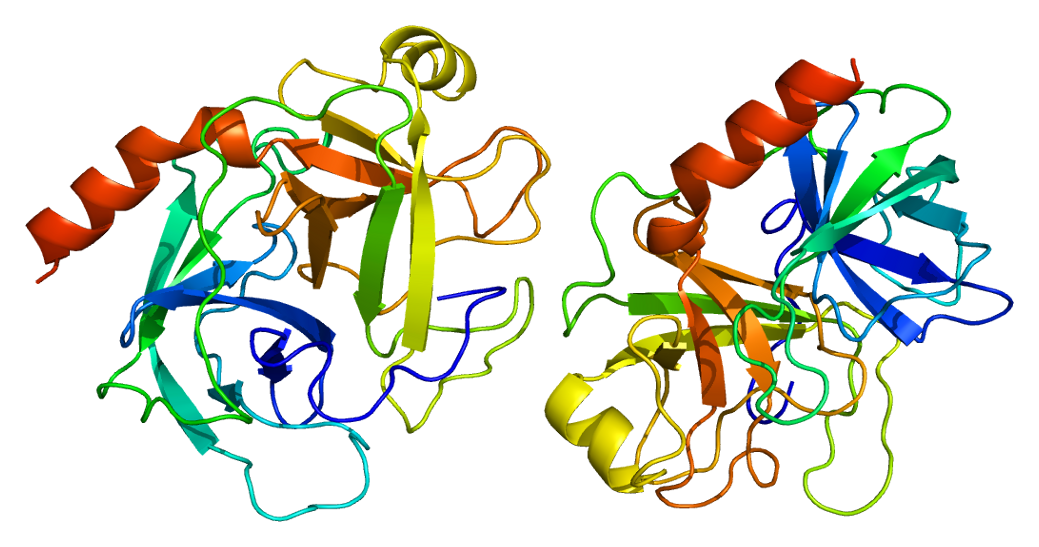
PRSS1

In chronic pancreatitis, there is a progressive destruction and scarring (fibrosis) of pancreatic tissue. This can initiated in a number of ways (such as damage to acinar or ductal cells), but whichever the cause, activation of pancreatic stellate cells has been implicated in producing scar tissue.

Genetically linked chronic pancreatitis is associated with an early onset of severe epigastric pain beginning in childhood. It is an autosomal dominant disease; chronic pancreatitis disease is identified in the cationic trypsinogen gene PRSS1, and mutation, R122H. R122H is the most common mutation for hereditary chronic pancreatitis with replacement of arginine with histidine at amino acid position 122 of the trypsinogen protein. There are, of course, other mechanisms – alcohol, malnutrition, smoking – each exhibiting its own effect on the pancreas.

== Diagnosis ==
The diagnosis of chronic pancreatitis is made based on the history and characteristics of symptoms combined with findings on radiologic imaging. Serum amylase and lipase may be moderately elevated in cases of chronic pancreatitis.

Symptoms of diarrhea, with oily, bulky, and foul-smelling stools indicated steatorrhea or fat malabsorption due to exocrine pancreatic insufficiency. Exocrine pancreatic insufficiency can be confirmed by also checking a fecal elastase level, with low levels specifying exocrine pancreatic insufficiency. A quantitative fecal fat test can also be done to quantify the fat levels in the stool and confirm the presence of exocrine pancreatic insufficiency.When chronic pancreatitis is caused by genetic factors, elevations in ESR, IgG4, rheumatoid factor, ANA and anti-smooth muscle antibody may be detected.

Computed tomography, magnetic resonance cholangiopancreatography (MRCP), and endoscopic ultrasound (EUS) all have similar sensitivity and specificity for diagnosing chronic pancreatitis. MRCP is particularly utilized for its sensitivity in imaging the pancreatic ducts and bile ducts for associated changes such as stones or strictures. A biopsy of the pancreas is not required for the diagnosis. On imaging, pancreatic and bile duct dilatation, atrophy of the pancreas, multiple calcifications of the pancreas, and enlargement of pancreatic glands can be found.

On MRI scan, there is a low T1 signal due to inflammation, fibrosis, focal lesions, and calcifications. In those who are given a contrast agent, there would be a higher T1 signal with late gadolinium enhancement due to compression from the fibrotic areas. The overall thickness of the pancreas will be reduced.

== Treatment ==
The different treatment options for the management of chronic pancreatitis are medical measures, therapeutic endoscopy, and surgery. Treatment is directed, when possible, to the underlying cause, and to relieve pain and malabsorption. Insulin-dependent diabetes mellitus may occur and need long-term insulin therapy. The abdominal pain can be very severe and require high doses of analgesics, sometimes including opiates. Medications such as pregabalin, gabapentin, tricyclic antidepressants and serotonin–norepinephrine reuptake inhibitors (SNRIs) are commonly used to treat pain in chronic pancreatitis. Alcohol cessation is important to manage pain and slow the calcific process, possibly reducing the future risk of flare-ups. Antioxidants may help, but it is unclear if the benefits are meaningful.

Endoscopic treatments, including removal of stones in the pancreatic duct, and dilation of strictures may be done. Extracorporeal shockwave lithotripsy can also be done, in which external acoustic waves are administered to break the stones. This may be combined with endoscopic retrograde cholangiopancreatography to collect larger stones.

Behavioral treatments such as cognitive behavioral therapy including resilience training, stress management, chronic pain rehabilitation programs and addiction treatment may also be used as adjunct treatments.

=== Pancreatic enzymes ===
Pancreatic enzyme replacement is often effective in treating the malabsorption and steatorrhea associated with chronic pancreatitis. Treatment of CP consists of the administration of a solution of pancreatic enzymes with meals. Some patients do have pain reduction with enzyme replacement, and since they are relatively safe, giving enzyme replacement to a chronic pancreatitis patient is an acceptable step in treatment for most patients. Treatment may be more likely to be successful in those without the involvement of large ducts and those with idiopathic pancreatitis.

=== Surgery ===
Surgery to treat chronic pancreatitis tends to be divided into two areas – resectional and drainage procedures. Among the reasons to opt for surgery is if there is a pseudocyst, fistula, ascites, or a fixed obstruction. The Puestow procedure (anastomosis of the pancreatic duct to the jejunum to allow drainage of the obstructed duct), pancreaticoduodenectomy (partial pancreatic resection), or total pancreatectomy with or without autologous islet cell transplantation (removal of the whole pancreas, which is usually reserved for cases refractory to other surgical and medical interventions) may be used for treatment of chronic pancreatitis.

== Epidemiology ==
The annual incidence of chronic pancreatitis is 5 to 12 per 100,000 persons. The prevalence of chronic pancreatitis in the U.S. is 90–100 per 100,000 adults. Chronic pancreatitis affects people in countries around the world.

== See also ==
- Exocrine pancreatic insufficiency
- Type 3c diabetes
- Acute pancreatitis
