= Trypsin-3 =

Enzyme found in humans

PRSS3

Identifiers
- Aliases: PRSS3, MTG, PRSS4, T9, TRY3, TRY4, protease, serine 3, serine protease 3
- External IDs: OMIM: 613578; MGI: 102757; GeneCards: PRSS3
Available structures
PDB	Ortholog search: PDBe RCSB
PDB	List of PDB id codes 1H4W, 2R9P, 3L33, 3L3T, 3P92, 3P95, 4DG4, 4U30, 4U32, 5C67
Enzyme activity
EC #	BRENDA	ExPASy	KEGG	MetaCyc
3.4.21.4	↗	↗	↗	↗

Gene location (Human)
Chr.	Chromosome 9 (human)
Band	9p13.3	Start	33,750,679 bp
Band	9p13.3	End	33,799,231 bp

Gene location (Mouse)
Chr.	Chromosome 6 (mouse)
Band	6|6 B1	Start	41,279,203 bp
Band	6|6 B1	End	41,282,466 bp
RNA expression pattern
Bgee	Human / Mouse (ortholog); Top expressed in: body of pancreas; mucosa of ileum; mucosa of transverse colon; jejunal mucosa; duodenum; mucosa of sigmoid colon; islet of Langerhans; rectum; beta cell; gums / Top expressed in: pancreas; islet of Langerhans; stomach; embryo; colon; quadriceps femoris muscle; duodenum; esophagus; jejunum; primary oocyte; More reference expression data
BioGPS	n/a
Gene ontology
Molecular function	calcium ion binding; peptidase activity; serine-type endopeptidase activity; protein binding; hydrolase activity; metal ion binding; serine-type peptidase activity
Cellular component	extracellular region; extracellular space; tertiary granule lumen
Biological process	digestion; cobalamin metabolic process; zymogen activation; endothelial cell migration; proteolysis; antimicrobial humoral response; neutrophil degranulation
Sources:Amigo / QuickGO
Orthologs
Databases	NCBI: entry; OMA: entry
Species	Human	Mouse
Entrez	5646	22074
Ensembl	ENSG00000010438	ENSMUSG00000054106
UniProt	P35030	Q9R0T7
RefSeq (mRNA)	NM_001197097; NM_001197098; NM_002771; NM_007343	NM_011646
RefSeq (protein)	NP_001184026; NP_001184027; NP_002762; NP_031369	NP_035776
Location (UCSC)	Chr 9: 33.75 – 33.8 Mb	Chr 6: 41.28 – 41.28 Mb
PubMed search
- Wikidata
View/Edit Human	View/Edit Mouse

Trypsin-3 (also called Mesotrypsin or Serine protease 3) is an enzyme that in humans is encoded by the PRSS3 gene. Like other trypsins, trypsin-3 is a digestive enzyme which is secreted in an inactive form as part of pancreatic juice. Trypsin-3 is distinctive in its resistance to common trypsin inhibitors and expression in the brain in addition to the pancreas.

== Function ==
This gene encodes a trypsinogen, which is a member of the trypsin family of serine proteases. This enzyme is expressed in the brain and the acinar cells of the pancreas and is resistant to common trypsin inhibitors. It is active on peptide linkages involving the carboxyl group of lysine or arginine. This gene is localized to the locus of T cell receptor beta variable orphans on chromosome 9. Four transcript variants encoding different isoforms have been described for this gene.

== See also ==
- Trypsin 1
- Trypsin-2
