= SPINK1 =

Protein-coding gene found in humans

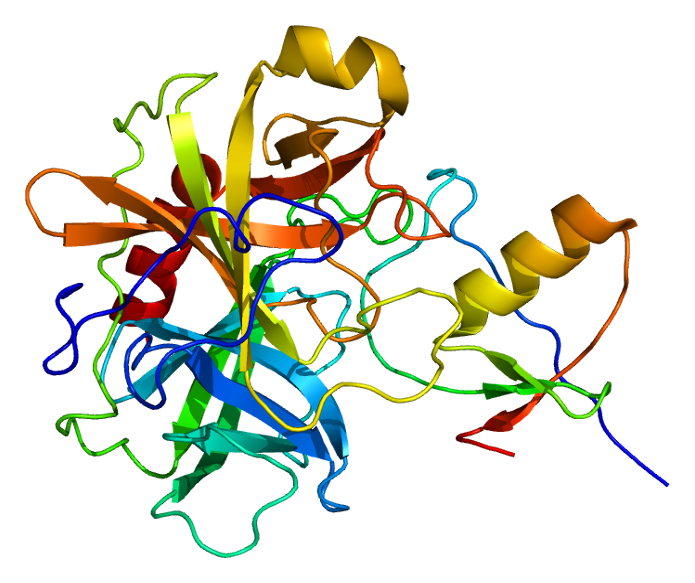

Identifiers
- Aliases: SPINK1, PCTT, PSTI, Spink3, TATI, TCP, serine peptidase inhibitor, Kazal type 1, serine peptidase inhibitor Kazal type 1
- External IDs: OMIM: 167790; MGI: 106202; GeneCards: SPINK1
Available structures
PDB	Ortholog search: PDBe RCSB
PDB	List of PDB id codes 1CGI, 1CGJ, 1HPT

Gene location (Human)
Chr.	Chromosome 5 (human)
Band	5q32	Start	147,824,572 bp
Band	5q32	End	147,831,671 bp

Gene location (Mouse)
Chr.	Chromosome 18 (mouse)
Band	18|18 B3	Start	43,861,147 bp
Band	18|18 B3	End	43,870,622 bp
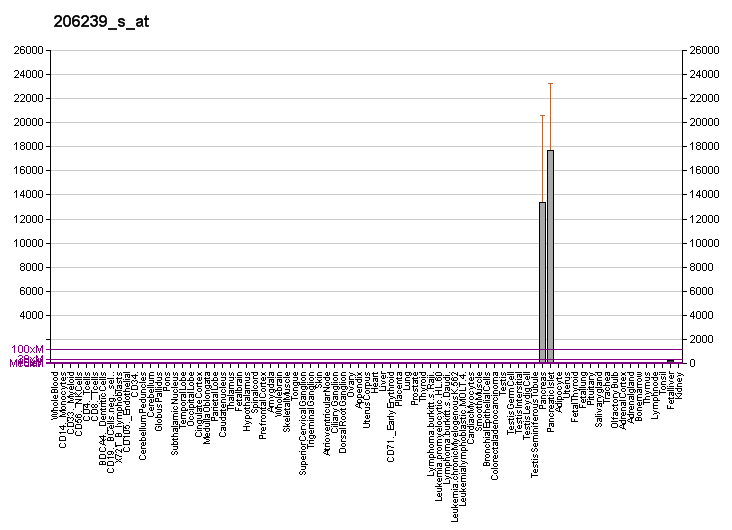
RNA expression pattern
Bgee	Human / Mouse (ortholog); Top expressed in: body of pancreas; islet of Langerhans; pancreatic ductal cell; beta cell; duodenum; jejunal mucosa; rectum; mucosa of transverse colon; mucosa of sigmoid colon; pylorus / Top expressed in: seminal vesicula; intestinal villus; epithelium of small intestine; ileum; right kidney; left colon; human kidney; pyloric antrum; jejunum; duodenum; More reference expression data
BioGPS	More reference expression data
Gene ontology
Molecular function	peptidase inhibitor activity; endopeptidase inhibitor activity; protein binding; serine-type endopeptidase inhibitor activity
Cellular component	extracellular region; acrosomal vesicle; extracellular exosome; extracellular space
Biological process	negative regulation of nitric oxide mediated signal transduction; regulation of acrosome reaction; negative regulation of peptidase activity; negative regulation of peptidyl-tyrosine phosphorylation; negative regulation of serine-type endopeptidase activity; regulation of store-operated calcium entry; negative regulation of calcium ion import; sperm capacitation
Sources:Amigo / QuickGO
Orthologs
Databases	NCBI: entry; OMA: entry
Species	Human	Mouse
Entrez	6690	20730
Ensembl	ENSG00000164266	ENSMUSG00000024503
UniProt	P00995	P09036
RefSeq (mRNA)	NM_003122; NM_001354966; NM_001379610	NM_009258
RefSeq (protein)	NP_003113; NP_001341895; NP_001366539	NP_033284
Location (UCSC)	Chr 5: 147.82 – 147.83 Mb	Chr 18: 43.86 – 43.87 Mb
PubMed search
- Wikidata
View/Edit Human	View/Edit Mouse

Pancreatic secretory trypsin inhibitor (PSTI) also known as serine protease inhibitor Kazal-type 1 (SPINK1) or tumor-associated trypsin inhibitor (TATI) is a protein that in humans is encoded by the SPINK1 gene. In the context of rat biology, it is also sometimes called monitor peptide.

== Structure ==
Rat monitor peptide is composed of 61 amino acids (compared to 56 in humans) with a molecular weight of approximately 6500 daltons and is basic (PI = 9.0), acid stable, and heat resistant. It is only found in the zymogen granules of pancreatic acinar cells.

== Function ==
SPINK functions as a competitive inhibitor of trypsin, which is a protease that can activate other proteases. It has been shown to prevent premature activation of pancreatic enzymes.

== In rats ==
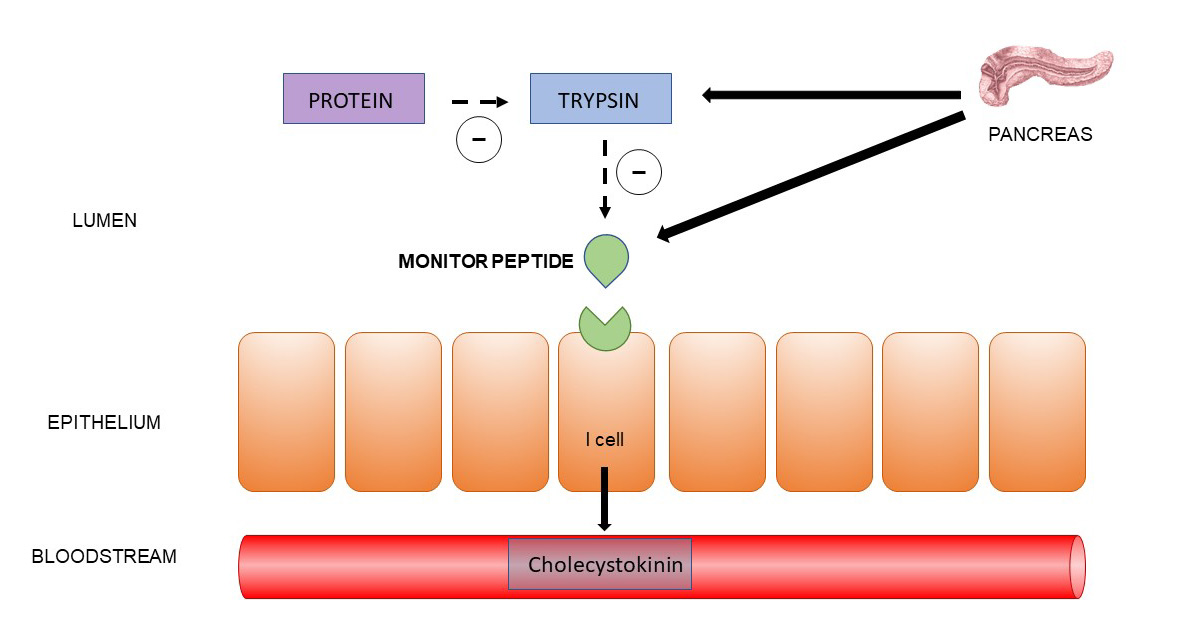
Function of monitor peptide

In addition to its role as a trypsin inhibitor, in rats it has also been found to stimulate the release of CCK from the enteroendocrine cells of the small intestine, and it has been called "monitor peptide" in this context. CCK then acts on the gallbladder to release bile and on the pancreas to release digestive enzymes, which help to further break down the food. This coordinated response helps to ensure efficient digestion and absorption of nutrients.

Monitor peptide binds to intestinal epithelial cells and induces CCK-release, which enhances pancreatic secretion in the presence of nutritional protein in the duodenum. When all nutritional protein is digested, monitor peptide is bound by trypsin and subsequently degraded, resulting in decreasing CCK-release and a reduction of pancreatic secretion.

Similar to CCK-releasing peptide (CCK-RP, homologous to DBI), it is trypsin sensitive and stimulates CCK release. It is possible that it also stimulates the growth of intestinal epithelial cells.

== Clinical significance ==
Mutations in SPINK1 has been associated with hereditary pancreatitis and tropical pancreatitis. Trypsinogen is normally created and stored an inactive zymogen of trypsin in the pancreas, but occasionally will autoactivate itself. PSTI serves to cleave prematurely activated trypsin to prevent the enzyme from causing cellular damage to the organ. Without the function of PSTI, the pancreas is subject to repeated episodes of damage.

It has also been associated with prostate cancer.

== History ==
Monitor peptide was discovered in 1984 when it was purified from rat bile-pancreatic juice and the peptide sequence was elucidated.

== See also ==
- Kazal-type serine protease inhibitor domain
- Pancreatitis
