= Tosyl phenylalanyl chloromethyl ketone =

Chemical compound

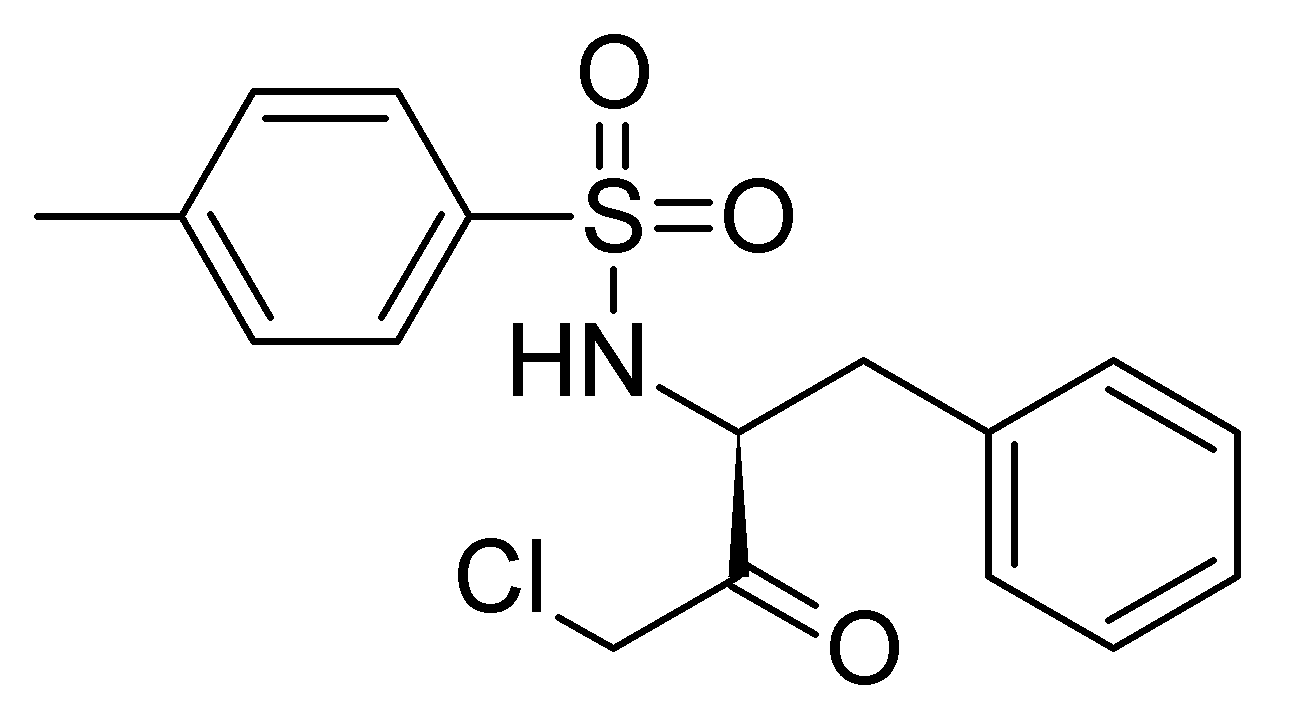

Names
- Preferred IUPAC name N-[(2S)-4-Chloro-3-oxo-1-phenylbutan-2-yl]-4-methylbenzene-1-sulfonamide

Identifiers
CAS Number	402-71-1
3D model (JSmol)	Interactive image
ChemSpider	388718
ECHA InfoCard	100.006.323
MeSH	Tosylphenylalanyl+Chloromethyl+Ketone
PubChem CID	439647
UNII	P598716LJT
CompTox Dashboard (EPA)	DTXSID60883376
- InChI: InChI=1S/C17H18ClNO3S/c1-13-7-9-15(10-8-13)23(21,22)19-16(17(20)12-18)11-14-5-3-2-4-6-14/h2-10,16,19H,11-12H2,1H3/t16-/m0/s1 Key: MQUQNUAYKLCRME-INIZCTEOSA-N; InChI=1/C17H18ClNO3S/c1-13-7-9-15(10-8-13)23(21,22)19-16(17(20)12-18)11-14-5-3-2-4-6-14/h2-10,16,19H,11-12H2,1H3/t16-/m0/s1 Key: MQUQNUAYKLCRME-INIZCTEOBY
- SMILES: Cc1ccc(cc1)S(=O)(=O)N[C@@H](Cc2ccccc2)C(=O)CCl

Properties
Chemical formula	C_{17}H_{18}ClNO_{3}S
Molar mass	351.848 g/mol
- Except where otherwise noted, data are given for materials in their standard state (at 25 °C [77 °F], 100 kPa). verify (what is ?) Infobox references

Tosyl phenylalanyl chloromethyl ketone (TPCK) is a protease inhibitor. Its structural formula is 1-chloro-3-tosylamido-4-phenyl-2-butanone.

== Uses ==
TPCK is an irreversible inhibitor of chymotrypsin. Also inhibits some cysteine proteases such as caspase, papain, bromelain or ficin. It does not inhibit trypsin or zymogens.

TPCK is observed covalently bound in the active site of Caspase 3 in the crystal structure of the complex solved in 2010. The chloromethyl group reacts with the active site cysteine to form a covalent bond with the loss of the chlorine.

TPCK is chosen for the chemical labelling of active histidine in enzyme analysis. The phenylalanine moiety is bound to the enzyme because of specificity for aromatic amino acid residues at the active site (as in chymotrypsin, in which it binds to the histidine-57 residue in the active site).

=== Virology ===
TPCK-treated trypsin is used to improve infection yield in laboratory tissue culture of some wild virus isolates that are not well-adapted to growth in vitro, such as some low-pathogenic avian influenza strains or fresh clinical isolates of SARS-CoV-2. The trypsin performs the maturation cleavage of the viral envelope proteins efficiently.
