= PRSS8 =

Protein-coding gene in the species Homo sapiens

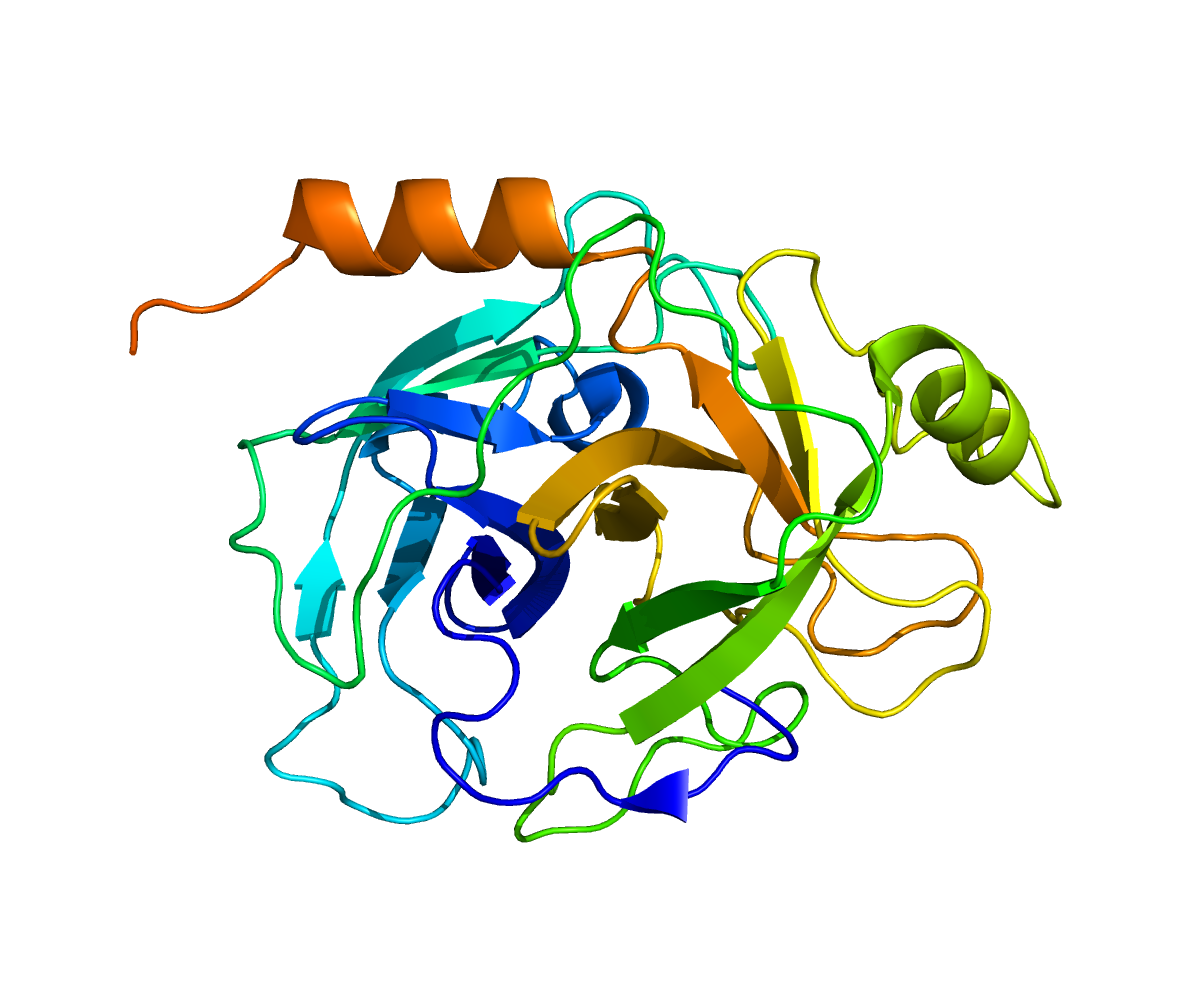

Identifiers
- Aliases: PRSS8, CAP1, PROSTASIN, protease, serine 8, serine protease 8
- External IDs: OMIM: 600823; MGI: 1923810; GeneCards: PRSS8
Available structures
PDB	Ortholog search: PDBe RCSB
PDB	List of PDB id codes 3DFJ, 3DFL, 3E0N, 3E0P, 3E16, 3E1X, 3FVF, 3GYL, 3GYM

Gene location (Human)
Chr.	Chromosome 16 (human)
Band	16p11.2	Start	31,131,433 bp
Band	16p11.2	End	31,135,727 bp

Gene location (Mouse)
Chr.	Chromosome 7 (mouse)
Band	7 F3|7 69.84 cM	Start	127,524,888 bp
Band	7 F3|7 69.84 cM	End	127,529,276 bp
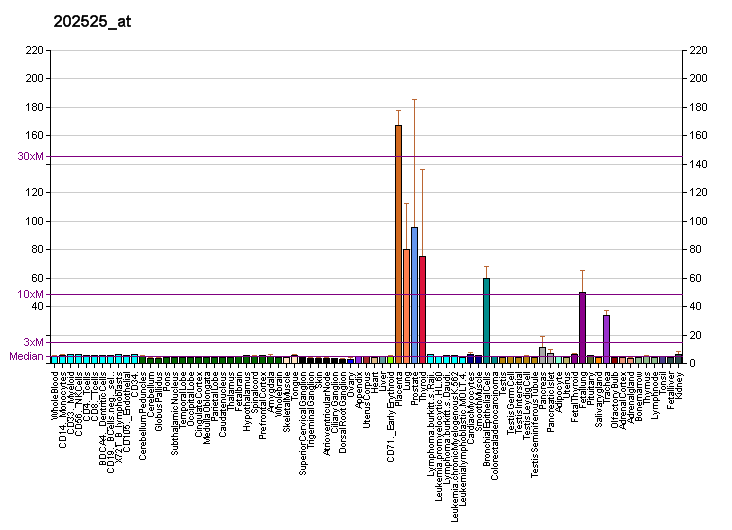
RNA expression pattern
Bgee	Human / Mouse (ortholog); Top expressed in: mucosa of transverse colon; minor salivary glands; mucosa of ileum; body of pancreas; skin of abdomen; skin of leg; olfactory zone of nasal mucosa; corpus epididymis; rectum; duodenum / Top expressed in: right kidney; proximal tubule; trophoblast cell; yolk sac; human kidney; saccule; inner renal medulla; vestibular membrane of cochlear duct; lacrimal gland; otic placode; More reference expression data
BioGPS	More reference expression data
Gene ontology
Molecular function	peptidase activity; serine-type peptidase activity; serine-type endopeptidase activity; protein binding; hydrolase activity; sodium channel regulator activity; endopeptidase activity
Cellular component	integral component of membrane; extracellular region; plasma membrane; extracellular exosome; membrane; extrinsic component of plasma membrane; anchored component of plasma membrane; extracellular space
Biological process	proteolysis; positive regulation of sodium ion transport; cornification; regulation of molecular function
Sources:Amigo / QuickGO
Orthologs
Databases	NCBI: entry; OMA: entry
Species	Human	Mouse
Entrez	5652	76560
Ensembl	ENSG00000052344	ENSMUSG00000030800
UniProt	Q16651	Q9ESD1
RefSeq (mRNA)	NM_002773	NM_133351
RefSeq (protein)	NP_002764	n/a
Location (UCSC)	Chr 16: 31.13 – 31.14 Mb	Chr 7: 127.52 – 127.53 Mb
PubMed search
- Wikidata
View/Edit Human	View/Edit Mouse

Prostasin is a protein that in humans is encoded by the PRSS8 gene.

This gene encodes a trypsinogen, which is a member of the trypsin family of serine proteases. This enzyme is highly expressed in prostate epithelia and is one of several proteolytic enzymes found in seminal fluid. The proprotein is cleaved to produce a light chain and a heavy chain which are associated by a disulfide bond. It is active on peptide linkages involving the carboxyl group of lysine or arginine.

The protein is implicated in epithelial sodium channel regulation and may help regulate a variety of tissue functions that involve a sodium channel.

High prostasin plasma levels may be associated with a higher risk for diabetes and death from cancer, especially in people with high blood sugar.
