= Aspergillopepsin I =

Enzyme found in Aspergillus

Identifiers
- EC no.: 3.4.23.18
- CAS no.: 9025-49-4

Databases
- IntEnz: IntEnz view
- BRENDA: BRENDA entry
- ExPASy: NiceZyme view
- KEGG: KEGG entry
- MetaCyc: metabolic pathway
- PRIAM: profile
- PDB structures: RCSB PDB PDBe PDBsum
Search
- PMC: articles
- PubMed: articles
- NCBI: proteins

Aspergillopepsin I (EC 3.4.23.18, Aspergillus acid protease, Aspergillus acid proteinase, Aspergillus aspartic proteinase, Aspergillus awamori acid proteinase, Aspergillus carboxyl proteinase, carboxyl proteinase, Aspergillus kawachii aspartic proteinase, Aspergillus saitoi acid proteinase, pepsin-type aspartic proteinase, Aspergillus niger acid proteinase, sumizyme AP, proctase P, denapsin, denapsin XP 271, proctase) is an enzyme. This enzyme catalyses the following chemical reaction

Hydrolysis of proteins with broad specificity. Generally favours hydrophobic residues in P1 and P1', but also accepts Lys in P1, which leads to activation of trypsinogen. Does not clot milk

This enzyme is found in a variety of Aspergillus species.

== See also ==
- Trypsinogen
