= MED25 =

Protein-coding gene in the species Homo sapiens

Identifiers
- Aliases: MED25, ACID1, ARC92, CMT2B2, P78, PTOV2, BVSYS, TCBAP0758, mediator complex subunit 25
- External IDs: OMIM: 610197; MGI: 1922863; GeneCards: MED25
Available structures
PDB	Ortholog search: PDBe RCSB
PDB	List of PDB id codes 2KY6, 2L6U, 2XNF, 2L23

Gene location (Human)
Chr.	Chromosome 19 (human)
Band	19q13.33	Start	49,818,282 bp
Band	19q13.33	End	49,840,383 bp

Gene location (Mouse)
Chr.	Chromosome 7 (mouse)
Band	7 B3|7 28.95 cM	Start	44,876,765 bp
Band	7 B3|7 28.95 cM	End	44,892,712 bp
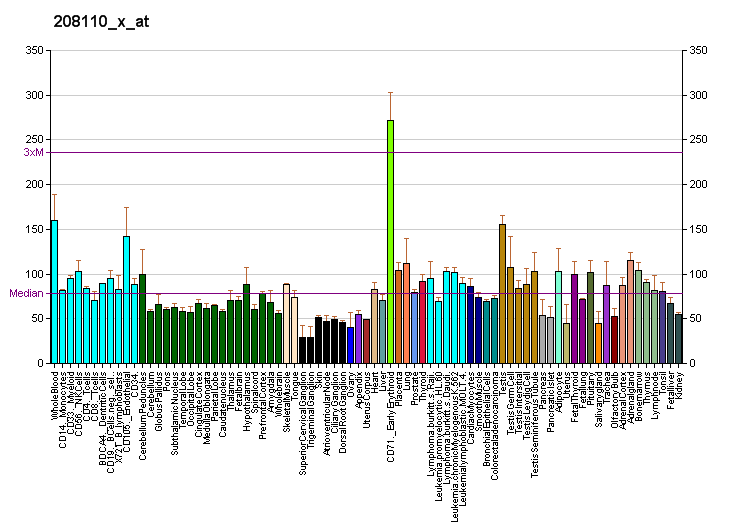

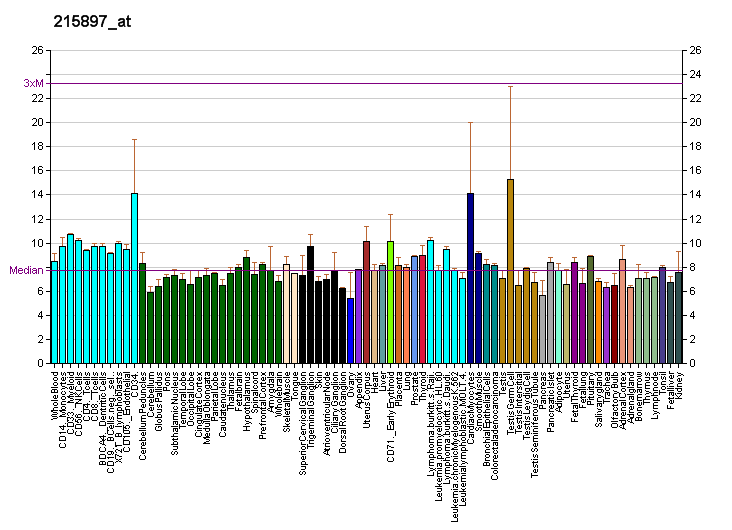
RNA expression pattern
Bgee	Human / Mouse (ortholog); Top expressed in: oocyte; secondary oocyte; right testis; left testis; right adrenal cortex; right uterine tube; left adrenal cortex; blood; muscle of thigh; bronchial epithelial cell / Top expressed in: ventricular zone; muscle of thigh; yolk sac; dentate gyrus of hippocampal formation granule cell; superior frontal gyrus; primary visual cortex; lip; epiblast; spermatid; molar; More reference expression data
BioGPS	More reference expression data
Gene ontology
Molecular function	transcription factor binding; protein binding; retinoic acid receptor binding; retinoid X receptor binding
Cellular component	nucleus; nucleoplasm; mediator complex
Biological process	transcription initiation from RNA polymerase II promoter; regulation of transcription, DNA-templated; negative regulation of transcription by RNA polymerase II; positive regulation of chromatin binding; negative regulation of fibroblast proliferation; positive regulation of mediator complex assembly; positive regulation of transcription by RNA polymerase II; transcription, DNA-templated
Sources:Amigo / QuickGO
Orthologs
Databases	NCBI: entry; OMA: entry
Species	Human	Mouse
Entrez	81857	75613
Ensembl	ENSG00000104973	ENSMUSG00000002968
UniProt	Q71SY5	Q8VCB2
RefSeq (mRNA)	NM_030973; NM_001378355	NM_029365; NM_001331206; NM_001331207; NM_001331208
RefSeq (protein)	NP_112235; NP_001365284	NP_001318135; NP_001318136; NP_001318137; NP_083641
Location (UCSC)	Chr 19: 49.82 – 49.84 Mb	Chr 7: 44.88 – 44.89 Mb
PubMed search
- Wikidata
View/Edit Human	View/Edit Mouse

Mediator of RNA polymerase II transcription subunit 25 is an enzyme that in humans is encoded by the MED25 gene.

== Intellectual developmental disorder ==
A homozygous variant in the MED25 gene, leading to an arginine to trypsin substitution, was identified in seven individuals with impaired intellectual development and characteristic facial features. The genetic variant segregated with the disorder and was not found in control populations. This putative homozygous variant arose 218 years ago in this Brazilian family.

== Interactions ==
MED25 has been shown to interact with MED4.
