= Hereditary pancreatitis =

- This condition is inherited in an autosomal dominant manner

Hereditary pancreatitis (HP) is an inflammation of the pancreas due to genetic causes. It was first described in 1952 by Comfort and Steinberg but it was not until 1996 that Whitcomb et al isolated the first responsible mutation in the trypsinogen gene (PRSS1) on the long arm of chromosome seven (7q35).

The term "hereditary pancreatitis" is used when a genetic biomarker is identified, and "familial pancreatitis" otherwise.

== Presentation ==
HP is characterised by attacks of epigastric pain, which are often associated with nausea and vomiting. Symptoms may start shortly after birth but onset varies periodically, with some patients not exhibiting symptoms until adulthood. There is usually progression to chronic pancreatitis with endocrine and exocrine failure and a mortally increased risk of pancreatic cancer. Lifetime risk of cancer has been variously calculated as 35–54% to the age of 75 years and screening for early pancreatic cancer is being offered to HP sufferers on a scientific basis. Some patients may choose to have their pancreas surgically removed to prevent pancreatic cancer from developing in the future.

The epidemiology of HP follows a similar pattern to alcohol-associated chronic pancreatitis, but there are important differences. For example, HP typically has an earlier age of pancreatitis onset; although malabsorption and diabetes mellitus occur at a later stage in the disease progression.

== Genetics ==
The vast majority of the cases of HP are caused by substitutions, at base 365 (c.365G>A) and base 86 of the cDNA (c.86A>T) on the PRSS1 gene. The nucleotide substitutions were discovered in the late 1990s by classical linkage analysis and are now known as p.R122H and p.N29I respectively, according to the amino acid substitution and position in the protein sequence.

These mutations are rarely identified in general screens of patients with idiopathic disease and the phenotype of p.R122H and p.N29I is now well characterised with the p.A16V mutation recently characterised for the first time. There are many other rare mutations or polymorphisms of PRSS1 which remain less well understood and not all HP families have had the responsible genetic mutation identified.

The mechanism by which these genetic mutations cause pancreatitis is not yet known; but is likely to be the result of increased autoactivation or reduced deactivation of trypsinogen. However, a novel mechanism has recently been identified in a p.R116C kindred.

== Diagnosis ==
Families are defined as having HP, if the phenotype is consistent with highly penetrant autosomal dominant inheritance. In simple terms, this would require two or more first degree relatives (or three or more second degree relatives) to have unexplained recurrent-acute or chronic pancreatitis in two or more generations. It is an autosomal dominant disease with penetrance that is generally accepted to be ≈80%.

== Management ==
Treatment of HP resemble that of chronic pancreatitis of other causes. Treatment focuses on enzyme and nutritional supplementation, pain management, pancreatic diabetes, and local organ complications, such as pseudocysts, bile duct or duodenal obstruction.(PMC1774562)

== Prognosis ==
A 2009 study which followed 189 patients found no excess mortality despite the increased risk of pancreatic cancer.
