= Trypsin 1 =

Protein-coding gene in the species Homo sapiens

PRSS1
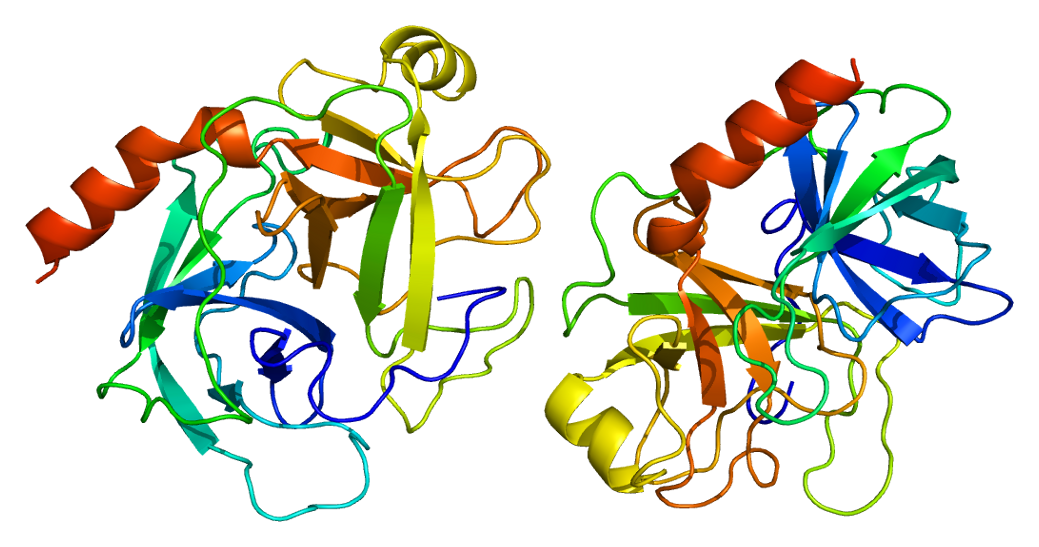

Identifiers
- Aliases: PRSS1, TRP1, TRY1, TRY4, TRYP1, Trypsin 1, protease, serine 1, serine protease 1
- External IDs: OMIM: 276000; MGI: 3687012; GeneCards: PRSS1
Available structures
PDB	Ortholog search: PDBe RCSB
PDB	List of PDB id codes 1FXY, 1TRN, 2RA3, 4WWY, 4WXV
Enzyme activity
EC #	BRENDA	ExPASy	KEGG	MetaCyc
3.4.21.4	↗	↗	↗	↗

Gene location (Human)
Chr.	Chromosome 7 (human)
Band	7q34	Start	142,749,468 bp
Band	7q34	End	142,753,076 bp

Gene location (Mouse)
Chr.	Chromosome 6 (mouse)
Band	6|6 B1	Start	41,331,039 bp
Band	6|6 B1	End	41,334,848 bp
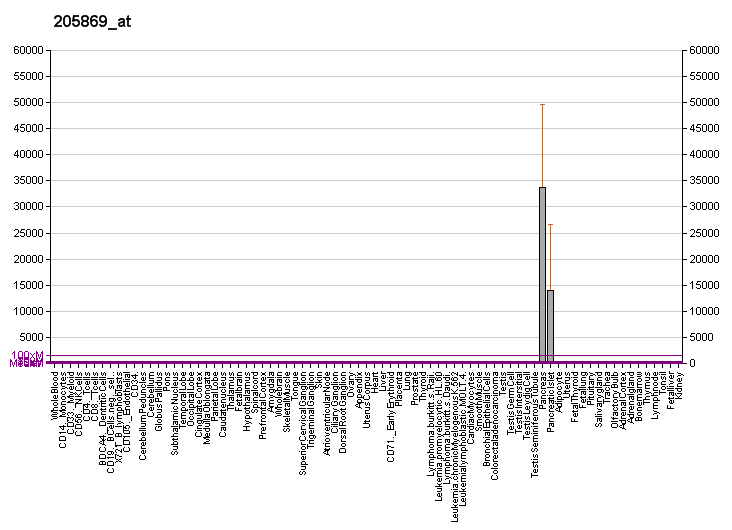
RNA expression pattern
Bgee	Human / Mouse (ortholog); Top expressed in: body of pancreas; islet of Langerhans; duodenum; body of stomach; fundus; ectocervix; right coronary artery; testicle; left uterine tube; right lobe of liver / Top expressed in: pancreas; islet of Langerhans; stomach; granulocyte; colon; duodenum; esophagus; jejunum; quadriceps femoris muscle; liver; More reference expression data
BioGPS	More reference expression data
Gene ontology
Molecular function	peptidase activity; serine-type endopeptidase activity; hydrolase activity; metal ion binding; serine-type peptidase activity
Cellular component	extracellular region; blood microparticle; extracellular exosome; extracellular space; collagen-containing extracellular matrix
Biological process	digestion; cobalamin metabolic process; extracellular matrix disassembly; proteolysis
Sources:Amigo / QuickGO
Orthologs
Databases	NCBI: entry; OMA: entry
Species	Human	Mouse
Entrez	5644	436522
Ensembl	ENSG00000274247; ENSG00000204983	ENSMUSG00000071521
UniProt	P07477	Q792Z1
RefSeq (mRNA)	NM_002769	NM_001038996
RefSeq (protein)	NP_002760	NP_001034085
Location (UCSC)	Chr 7: 142.75 – 142.75 Mb	Chr 6: 41.33 – 41.33 Mb
PubMed search
- Wikidata
View/Edit Human	View/Edit Mouse

Trypsin-1 is an enzyme that in humans is encoded by the PRSS1 gene. It is first produced in an inactive form which is often referred to as a trypsinogen. It must be later activated to the active form by another enzyme (either enteropeptidase or another trypsin) at which point it is referred to as a trypsin. This is one of the three isoforms of trypsin/trypsinogen found in pancreatic juice, the others being trypsin-2 and trypsin-3 (sometimes called mesotrypsin).

== Function ==
This gene encodes a trypsinogen, which is a member of the trypsin family of serine proteases. This enzyme is secreted by acinar cells of the pancreas and cleaved to its active form in the small intestine. It is active on peptide linkages involving the carboxyl group of lysine or arginine. Mutations in this gene are associated with hereditary pancreatitis. This gene and several other trypsinogen genes are localized to the T cell receptor beta locus on chromosome 7.

== Clinical significance ==
Its malfunction acts in an autosomal dominant manner to cause pancreatitis. Many mutations that can lead to pancreatitis have been found. An example is a mutation at Arg 117. Arg 117 is a trypsin-sensitive site which can be cleaved by another trypsin and becomes inactivated. This site may be a fail-safe mechanism by which trypsin, when activated within the pancreas, may become inactivated. Mutation at this cleavage site would result in a loss of control and preclude autodigestion, causing pancreatitis.

== See also ==
- Trypsin
