= Chymotrypsinogen =

Inactive precursor of digestive enzyme chymotrypsin

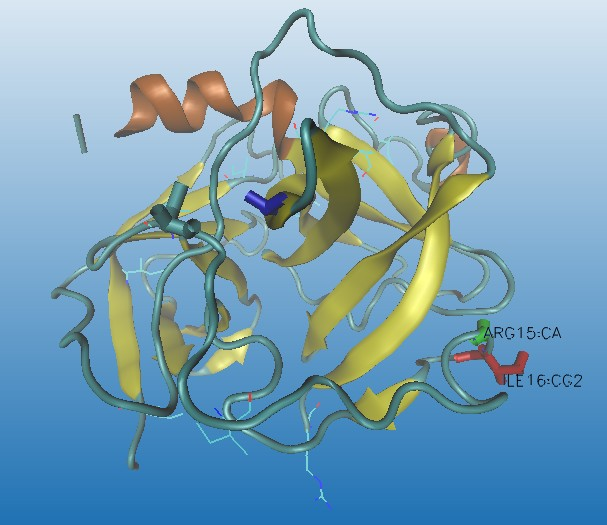
Chymotrypsinogen

Chymotrypsinogen is an inactive precursor (zymogen) of chymotrypsin, a digestive enzyme which breaks proteins down into smaller peptides. Chymotrypsinogen is a single polypeptide chain consisting of 245 amino acid residues. It is synthesized in the acinar cells of the pancreas and stored inside membrane-bounded granules at the apex of the acinar cell. Release of the granules from the cell is stimulated by either a hormonal signal or a nerve impulse, and the granules spill into a duct leading into the duodenum.

== Activation ==
Chymotrypsinogen must be inactive until it gets to the digestive tract, in order to prevent damage to the pancreas or any other organs. It is activated by another enzyme called trypsin. The active form is called π-chymotrypsin and is used to create α-chymotrypsin. Trypsin cleaves the peptide bond in chymotrypsinogen between arginine-15 and isoleucine-16. This creates two peptides within the π-chymotrypsin molecule, held together by a disulfide bond. One π-chymotrypsin acts on another by breaking a leucine and serine peptide bond. The activated π-chymotrypsin reacts with other π-chymotrypsin molecules to cleave and remove two dipeptides: serine-14–arginine-15 and threonine-147–asparagine-148. This reaction produces α-chymotrypsin. The yield of α-chymotrypsin can be affected by inhibitors such as hydrocinnate and also by pH, temperature and calcium chloride.

The activation process can be studied using fluorescence probe 2-p-toluidinylnaphthalene-6-sulfonate (TNS). TNS forms covalent bonds with chymotrypsinogen and as the bonds break to form chymotrypsin in the presence of trypsin, the fluorescence increases.
