= Trypsin =

Family of digestive enzymes

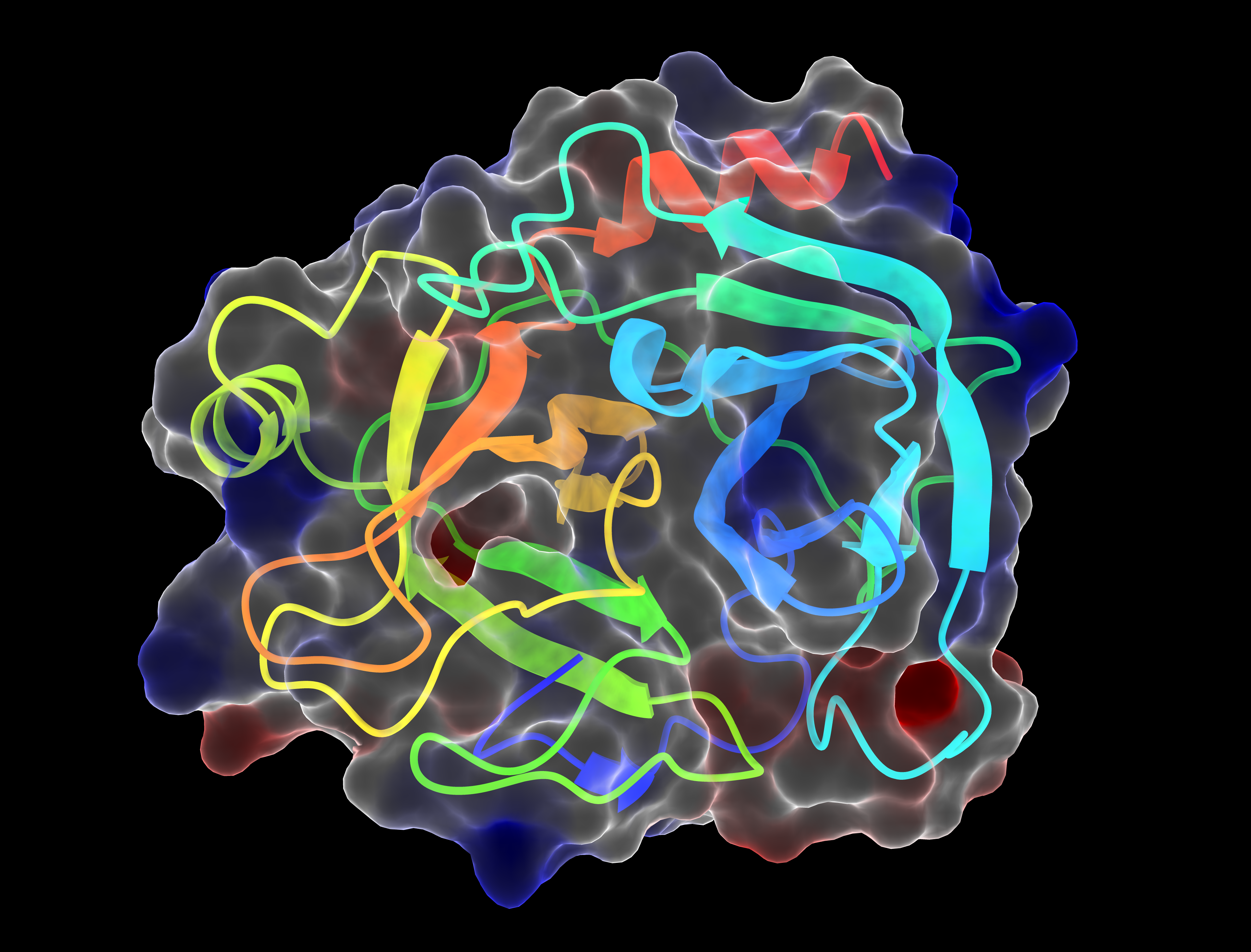
- Crystal structure of bovine trypsin.

Identifiers
- EC no.: 3.4.21.4
- CAS no.: 9002-07-7

Databases
- BRENDA: enzyme data
- ExPASy: NiceZyme view
- KEGG: enzyme entry
- MetaCyc: metabolic pathway
- Rhea: reactions
- PDB structures: RCSB PDB PDBe PDBsum
- Gene Ontology: AmiGO / QuickGO
Search
- PMC: articles
- PubMed: articles
- NCBI: proteins

Trypsin

Identifiers
- Symbol: Trypsin
- Pfam: PF00089
- InterPro: IPR001254
- SMART: SM00020
- PROSITE: PDOC00124
- MEROPS: S1
- SCOP2: 1c2g / SCOPe / SUPFAM
- CDD: cd00190
Available protein structures:
- PDB: IPR001254 PF00089 (ECOD; PDBsum)
- AlphaFold: IPR001254; PF00089

Trypsins are a type of enzyme that often function as digestive enzymes in humans and other vertebrates. They are a type of protease which means they act by helping to break bonds between amino acids in proteins. Digestive trypsins are part of an intermediate stage of protein digestion, where they cut long chains of amino acids into smaller pieces near the start of the small intestines. More generally, trypsins are serine protease enzymes from the PA clan superfamily, and in humans there are three classical varieties: trypsin 1, 2, and 3.

Trypsins are formed in the small intestines when their pancreas-produced proenzymes, known as trypsinogens, are activated with the help of enteropeptidase, a protease found in the intestines. Trypsin cuts peptide chains mainly at the carboxyl side of the amino acids lysine and arginine. It is widely used in numerous biotechnology applications in clinical and research laboratories. The enzymatic action of trypsin is commonly referred to as trypsinogen proteolysis or trypsinization, and proteins that have been digested or treated with trypsin are said to have been trypsinized.

Trypsin was discovered in 1876 by Wilhelm Kühne. Many sources incorrectly claim that Kühne derived the name trypsin from the Ancient Greek word for rubbing, tripsis, because the enzyme was first isolated by rubbing the pancreas with glass powder and alcohol; in fact Kühne named trypsin from the Ancient Greek word thrýpto, meaning "I break" or "I break apart".

== Function ==
In the duodenum, trypsin catalyzes the hydrolysis of peptide bonds, breaking down proteins into smaller peptides. The peptide products are then further hydrolyzed into amino acids via other proteases, rendering them available for absorption into the blood stream. Tryptic digestion is a necessary step in protein absorption, as proteins are generally too large to be absorbed through the lining of the small intestine.

Trypsin is produced as the inactive zymogen trypsinogen in the pancreas. When the pancreas is stimulated by cholecystokinin, it is then secreted into the first part of the small intestine (the duodenum) via the pancreatic duct. Once in the small intestine, the enzyme enterokinase (also called enteropeptidase) activates trypsinogen into trypsin by proteolytic cleavage. The trypsin then activates additional trypsin, chymotrypsin and carboxypeptidase.

== Mechanism ==
The enzymatic mechanism is similar to that of other serine proteases. These enzymes contain a catalytic triad consisting of histidine-57, aspartate-102, and serine-195. This catalytic triad was formerly called a charge relay system, implying the abstraction of protons from serine to histidine and from histidine to aspartate, but owing to evidence provided by NMR that the resultant alkoxide form of serine would have a much stronger pull on the proton than does the imidazole ring of histidine, current thinking holds instead that serine and histidine each have effectively equal share of the proton, forming short low-barrier hydrogen bonds therewith. By these means, the nucleophilicity of the active site serine is increased, facilitating its attack on the amide carbon during proteolysis. The enzymatic reaction that trypsin catalyzes is thermodynamically favorable, but requires significant activation energy (it is "kinetically unfavorable"). In addition, trypsin contains an "oxyanion hole" formed by the backbone amide hydrogen atoms of Gly-193 and Ser-195, which through hydrogen bonding stabilize the negative charge which accumulates on the amide oxygen after nucleophilic attack on the planar amide carbon by the serine oxygen causes that carbon to assume a tetrahedral geometry. Such stabilization of this tetrahedral intermediate helps to reduce the energy barrier of its formation and is concomitant with a lowering of the free energy of the transition state. Preferential binding of the transition state is a key feature of enzyme chemistry.

The negative aspartate residue (Asp 189) located in the catalytic pocket (S1) of trypsin is responsible for attracting and stabilizing positively charged lysine and/or arginine, and is, thus, responsible for the specificity of the enzyme. This means that trypsin predominantly cleaves proteins at the carboxyl side (or "C-terminal side") of the amino acids lysine and arginine except when either is bound to a C-terminal proline, although large-scale mass spectrometry data suggest cleavage occurs even with proline. Trypsin is considered an endopeptidase, i.e., the cleavage occurs within the polypeptide chain rather than at the terminal amino acids located at the ends of polypeptides.

== Properties ==
Animal trypsin has an optimal operating temperature of about 37 °C. In contrast, the Atlantic cod has several types of trypsins for the poikilotherm fish to survive at different body temperatures. Cod trypsins include trypsin I with an activity range of 4 to 65 °C (39 to 149 °F) and maximal activity at 55 °C (131 °F), as well as trypsin Y with a range of 2 to 30 °C (36 to 86 °F) and a maximal activity at 21 °C (70 °F).

As a protein, trypsin has various molecular weights depending on the source. For example, a molecular weight of 23.3 kDa is reported for trypsin from bovine and porcine sources.

The activity of trypsin is not affected by the enzyme inhibitor tosyl phenylalanyl chloromethyl ketone, TPCK, which deactivates chymotrypsin.

Trypsin should be stored at very cold temperatures (between −20 and −80 °C) to prevent autolysis, which may also be impeded by storage of trypsin at pH 3 or by using trypsin modified by reductive methylation. When the pH is adjusted back to pH 8, activity returns.

== Isozymes ==
These human genes encode proteins with trypsin enzymatic activity:

protease, serine, 1 (trypsin 1)

Identifiers
- Symbol: PRSS1
- Alt. symbols: TRY1
- NCBI gene: 5644
- HGNC: 9475
- OMIM: 276000
- RefSeq: NM_002769
- UniProt: P07477

Other data
- EC number: 3.4.21.4
- Locus: Chr. 7 q32-qter
Search for
- Structures: Swiss-model
- Domains: InterPro

protease, serine, 2 (trypsin 2)

Identifiers
- Symbol: PRSS2
- Alt. symbols: TRYP2
- NCBI gene: 5645
- HGNC: 9483
- OMIM: 601564
- RefSeq: NM_002770
- UniProt: P07478

Other data
- EC number: 3.4.21.4
- Locus: Chr. 7 q35
Search for
- Structures: Swiss-model
- Domains: InterPro

protease, serine, 3 (mesotrypsin)

Identifiers
- Symbol: PRSS3
- Alt. symbols: PRSS4
- NCBI gene: 5646
- HGNC: 9486
- OMIM: 613578
- RefSeq: NM_002771
- UniProt: P35030

Other data
- EC number: 3.4.21.4
- Locus: Chr. 9 p13
Search for
- Structures: Swiss-model
- Domains: InterPro

Other isoforms of trypsin may also be found in other organisms.

== Clinical significance ==
Activation of trypsin from proteolytic cleavage of trypsinogen in the pancreas can lead to a series of events that cause pancreatic self-digestion, resulting in pancreatitis. One consequence of the autosomal recessive disease cystic fibrosis is a deficiency in transport of trypsin and other digestive enzymes from the pancreas. This leads to the disorder termed meconium ileus, which involves intestinal obstruction (ileus) due to overly thick meconium, which is normally broken down by trypsin and other proteases, then passed in feces.

== Applications ==
Trypsin is available in high quantity in pancreases, and can be purified rather easily. Hence, it has been used widely in various biotechnological processes.

In a tissue culture lab, trypsin is used to resuspend cells adherent to the cell culture dish wall during the process of harvesting cells. Some cell types adhere to the sides and bottom of a dish when cultivated in vitro. Trypsin is used to cleave proteins holding the cultured cells to the dish, so that the cells can be removed from the plates.

Trypsin can also be used to dissociate dissected cells (for example, prior to cell fixing and sorting).

Trypsin can be used to break down casein in breast milk. If trypsin is added to a solution of milk powder, the breakdown of casein causes the milk to become translucent. The rate of reaction can be measured by using the amount of time needed for the milk to turn translucent.

Trypsin is commonly used in biological research during proteomics experiments to digest proteins into peptides for mass spectrometry analysis, e.g. in-gel digestion. Trypsin is particularly suited for this, since it has a very well defined specificity, as it hydrolyzes only the peptide bonds in which the carbonyl group is contributed either by an arginine or lysine residue.

Trypsin can also be used to dissolve blood clots in its microbial form and treat inflammation in its pancreatic form.

In veterinary medicine, trypsin is an ingredient in wound spray products, such as Debrisol, to dissolve dead tissue and pus in wounds in horses, cattle, dogs, and cats.

In India, Trypsin - Chymotrypsin is widely prescribed for inflammation reduction during laryngitis and surgery recovery. Use outside India is not well documented and most papers written on its effectivity in the aforementioned situations have been funded by Torrent Pharmaceuticals which is one major brand that makes these tablets in India.

=== In food ===
Commercial protease preparations usually consist of a mixture of various protease enzymes that often includes trypsin. These preparations are widely used in food processing:

- as a baking enzyme to improve the workability of dough
- in the extraction of seasonings and flavorings from vegetable or animal proteins and in the manufacture of sauces
- to control aroma formation in cheese and milk products
- to improve the texture of fish products
- to tenderize meat
- during cold stabilization of beer
- in the production of hypoallergenic food where proteases break down specific allergenic proteins into nonallergenic peptides, for example, proteases are used to produce hypoallergenic baby food from cow's milk, thereby diminishing the risk of babies developing milk allergies.

== Trypsin inhibitor ==
To prevent the action of active trypsin in the pancreas, which can be highly damaging, inhibitors such as SPINK1 (humans) or BPTI (cows) in the pancreas and α1-antitrypsin in the serum are present as part of the defense against its inappropriate activation. Any trypsin prematurely formed from the inactive trypsinogen is then bound by the inhibitor. The protein-protein interaction between trypsin and its inhibitors is one of the tightest bound, and trypsin is bound by some of its pancreatic inhibitors nearly irreversibly. In contrast with nearly all known protein assemblies, some complexes of trypsin bound by its inhibitors do not readily dissociate after treatment with 8M urea.

Trypsin inhibitors can serve as tools when addressing metabolic and obesity disorders. Metabolic disorders, obesity, and being overweight are known to increase non-communicable chronic disease prevalence. It is of public health policy interest to explore various ways to mitigate this occurrence including use of trypsin inhibitors. These inhibitors have capabilities of reducing colon, breast, skin, and prostate cancer by way of radioprotective and anticarcinogenic activity. Trypsin inhibitors can act as regulatory mechanisms to control release of neutrophil proteases and avoid significant tissue damage. In regards to cardiovascular conditions associated with unproductive serine protease activity, trypsin inhibitors can block their activity in platelet aggregation, fibrinolysis, coagulation, and blood coagulation.

The multifunctionality of trypsin inhibitors includes being potential protease inhibitors for AMP activity. While the antibacterial action mechanisms of trypsin inhibitors are unclear, studies have aimed to study their mechanisms as potential applications in bacterial infection treatments. Research and scanning microscopy showed antibacterial effects on bacterial membranes from Staphylococcus aureus. Trypsin inhibitors from amphibian skin showed bacterial death promotion that affected the cell wall and membrane of Staphylococcus aureus. Studies also analyzed antibacterial actions in trypsin inhibitor peptides, proteins, and E. coli. The results showed sufficient bacterial growth prevention. However, trypsin inhibitors have to meet certain criteria to be utilized in foods and medical treatments.

== Trypsin alternatives ==
Trypsin digestion of extra cellular matrix is a common practice in cell culture. However, this enzymatic degradation of the cells can negatively effect cell viability and surface markers, especially in stem cells. There are gentler alternatives than trypsin such as Accutase which doesn't effect surface markers such as cd14, cd117, cd49f, cd292. However Accutase decreases the surface levels of FasL and Fas receptor on macrophages, these receptors are associated with cell cytotoxicity in the immune system and can also facilitate apoptosis-related cell death.

ProAlanase could also serve as an alternative to Trypsin in proteomic applications. ProAlanase is an Aspergillus niger fungus protease that can achieve high proteolytic activity and specificity for digestion under the correct conditions. ProAlanase, the acidic prolyl-endopeptidase protease, previously studied as An-PEP, has been observed in various experiments to define its specificity. ProAlanase performed optimally in LC-MS applications with short digestion times and highly acidic pH.
