= Pancreatitis =

Inflammation of the pancreas

- The pancreas and surrounding organs
- Specialty: Gastroenterology; general surgery
- Symptoms: Pain in the upper abdomen; nausea; vomiting; fever; fatty stool
- Complications: Infection, bleeding, diabetes mellitus, pancreatic cancer, kidney failure, breathing problems, malnutrition
- Duration: Short or long term
- Causes: Gallstone; heavy alcohol use; direct trauma; certain medications; mumps
- Risk factors: Smoking
- Diagnostic method: Based on symptoms, blood amylase or lipase
- Treatment: Intravenous fluids, pain medication, antibiotics
- Frequency: 8.9 million (2015)
- Deaths: 132,700 (2015)

Pancreatitis is a condition characterized by inflammation of the pancreas. The pancreas is a large organ behind the stomach that produces digestive enzymes and a number of hormones. There are two main types, acute pancreatitis and chronic pancreatitis. Signs and symptoms of pancreatitis include pain in the upper abdomen, nausea, and vomiting. The pain often goes into the back and is usually severe. In acute pancreatitis, a fever may occur; symptoms typically resolve in a few days. In chronic pancreatitis, weight loss, fatty stool, and diarrhea may occur. Complications may include infection, bleeding, diabetes mellitus, or problems with other organs.

The two most common causes of acute pancreatitis are a gallstone blocking the common bile duct after the pancreatic duct has joined; and heavy alcohol use. Other causes include direct trauma, certain medications, infections such as mumps, and tumors. Chronic pancreatitis may develop as a result of acute pancreatitis. It is most commonly due to many years of heavy alcohol use. Other causes include high levels of blood fats, high blood calcium, some medications, and certain genetic disorders, such as cystic fibrosis, among others. Smoking increases the risk of both acute and chronic pancreatitis. Diagnosis of acute pancreatitis is based on a threefold increase in the blood of either amylase or lipase. In chronic pancreatitis, these tests may be normal. Medical imaging such as ultrasound and CT scan may also be useful.

Acute pancreatitis is usually treated with intravenous fluids, pain medication, and sometimes antibiotics. For patients with severe pancreatitis who cannot tolerate normal oral food consumption, a nasogastric tube is placed in the stomach. A procedure known as an endoscopic retrograde cholangiopancreatography (ERCP) may be done to examine the distal common bile duct and remove a gallstone if present. In those with gallstones the gallbladder is often also removed. In chronic pancreatitis, in addition to the above, temporary feeding through a nasogastric tube may be used to provide adequate nutrition. Long-term dietary changes and pancreatic enzyme replacement may be required. Occasionally, surgery is done to remove parts of the pancreas.

Globally, in 2015, about 8.9 million cases of pancreatitis occurred. This resulted in 132,700 deaths, up from 83,000 deaths in 1990. Acute pancreatitis occurs in about 30 per 100,000 people a year. New cases of chronic pancreatitis develop in about 8 per 100,000 people a year and currently affect about 50 per 100,000 people in the United States. It is more common in men than women. Often chronic pancreatitis starts between the ages of 30 and 40 and is rare in children. Acute pancreatitis was first described on autopsy in 1882, while chronic pancreatitis was first described in 1946.

== Signs and symptoms ==
The most common symptoms of pancreatitis are severe upper abdominal or left upper quadrant burning pain radiating to the back, nausea, and vomiting that is worse with eating. The physical examination will vary depending on severity and presence of internal bleeding. Blood pressure may be elevated by pain or decreased by dehydration or bleeding. Heart and respiratory rates are often elevated. The abdomen is usually tender but to a lesser degree than the pain itself. As is common in abdominal disease, bowel sounds may be reduced from reflex bowel paralysis. Fever or jaundice may be present. Chronic pancreatitis can lead to diabetes or pancreatic cancer. Unexplained weight loss may occur from a lack of pancreatic enzymes hindering digestion.

=== Complications ===
Early complications include shock, infection, systemic inflammatory response syndrome, low blood calcium, high blood glucose, and dehydration. Blood loss, dehydration, and fluid leaking into the abdominal cavity (ascites) can lead to kidney failure. Respiratory complications are often severe. Pleural effusion is usually present. Shallow breathing from pain can lead to lung collapse. Pancreatic enzymes may attack the lungs, causing inflammation. Severe inflammation can lead to intra-abdominal hypertension and abdominal compartment syndrome, further impairing renal and respiratory function and potentially requiring management with an open abdomen to relieve the pressure.

Late complications include recurrent pancreatitis and the development of pancreatic pseudocysts—collections of pancreatic secretions that have been walled off by scar tissue. These may cause pain, become infected, rupture and bleed, block the bile duct and cause jaundice, or migrate around the abdomen. Acute necrotizing pancreatitis can lead to a pancreatic abscess, a collection of pus caused by necrosis, liquefaction, and infection. This happens in approximately 3% of cases or almost 60% of cases involving more than two pseudocysts and gas in the pancreas.

== Causes ==
About 80 percent of pancreatitis cases are caused by gallstones or alcohol. Choledocholithiasis (gallstones in the bile duct) are the single most common cause of acute pancreatitis, and alcoholism is the single most common cause of chronic pancreatitis. Serum triglyceride levels greater than 1000 mg/dL (11.29 mmol/L, i.e., hyperlipidemia) is another cause.

The mnemonic "GET SMASHED" is often used to help clinicians and medical students remember the common causes of pancreatitis: Gallstones, Ethanol, Trauma, Steroids, Mumps, Autoimmune, Scorpion sting, Hyperlipidemia, hypothermia or hyperparathyroidism, ERCP, Drugs (commonly azathioprine, valproic acid, liraglutide).

=== Medications ===
There are seven classes of medications associated with acute pancreatitis: statins, ACE inhibitors, oral contraceptives/hormone replacement therapy (HRT), diuretics, antiretroviral therapy, valproic acid, and oral hypoglycemic agents. The mechanisms by which these drugs cause pancreatitis are not known. Statins may have a direct toxic effect on the pancreas or cause it through the long-term accumulation of toxic metabolites. Meanwhile, ACE inhibitors cause angioedema of the pancreas through the accumulation of bradykinin. Birth control pills and HRT cause arterial thrombosis of the pancreas through the accumulation of fat (hypertriglyceridemia). Diuretics such as furosemide have a direct toxic effect on the pancreas. Meanwhile, thiazide diuretics cause hypertriglyceridemia and hypercalcemia, where the latter is the risk factor for pancreatic stones.

HIV infection itself can cause a person to be more likely to get pancreatitis. Meanwhile, antiretroviral drugs may cause metabolic disturbances such as hyperglycemia and hypercholesterolemia, which predispose to pancreatitis. Valproic acid may have a direct toxic effect on the pancreas. Various oral hypoglycemic agents are associated with pancreatitis including metformin, but glucagon-like peptide-1 mimetics such as exenatide are more strongly associated with pancreatitis by promoting inflammation in combination with a high-fat diet.

Atypical antipsychotics such as clozapine, risperidone, and olanzapine can also cause pancreatitis.

=== Infection ===
A number of infectious agents have been recognized as causes of pancreatitis including:

- Viruses
  - Coxsackie virus
  - Cytomegalovirus
  - Hepatitis B
  - Herpes simplex virus
  - Mumps
  - Varicella-zoster virus
- Bacteria
  - Legionella
  - Leptospira
  - Mycoplasma
  - Salmonella
- Fungi
  - Aspergillus
- Parasites
  - Ascaris
  - Cryptosporidium
  - Toxoplasma

=== Other ===
Other common causes include trauma, autoimmune disease, high blood calcium, hypothermia, and endoscopic retrograde cholangiopancreatography (ERCP). Pancreas divisum is a common congenital malformation of the pancreas that may underlie some recurrent cases. Diabetes mellitus type 2 is associated with a 2.8-fold higher risk.

Less common causes include pancreatic cancer, pancreatic duct stones, vasculitis (inflammation of the small blood vessels in the pancreas), and porphyria—particularly acute intermittent porphyria and erythropoietic protoporphyria.

There is an inherited form that results in the activation of trypsinogen within the pancreas, leading to autodigestion. Involved genes may include trypsin 1, which codes for trypsinogen, SPINK1, which codes for a trypsin inhibitor, or cystic fibrosis transmembrane conductance regulator.

== Diagnosis ==
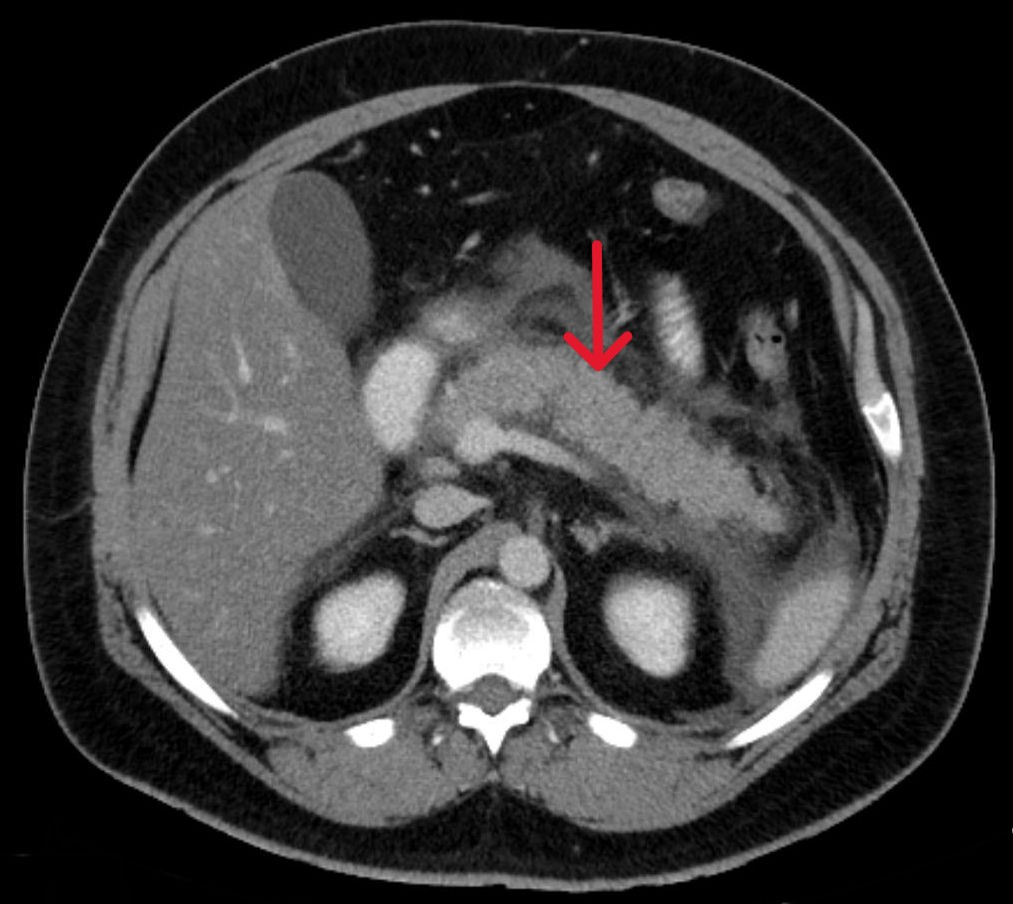
Acute exudative pancreatitis on CT scan

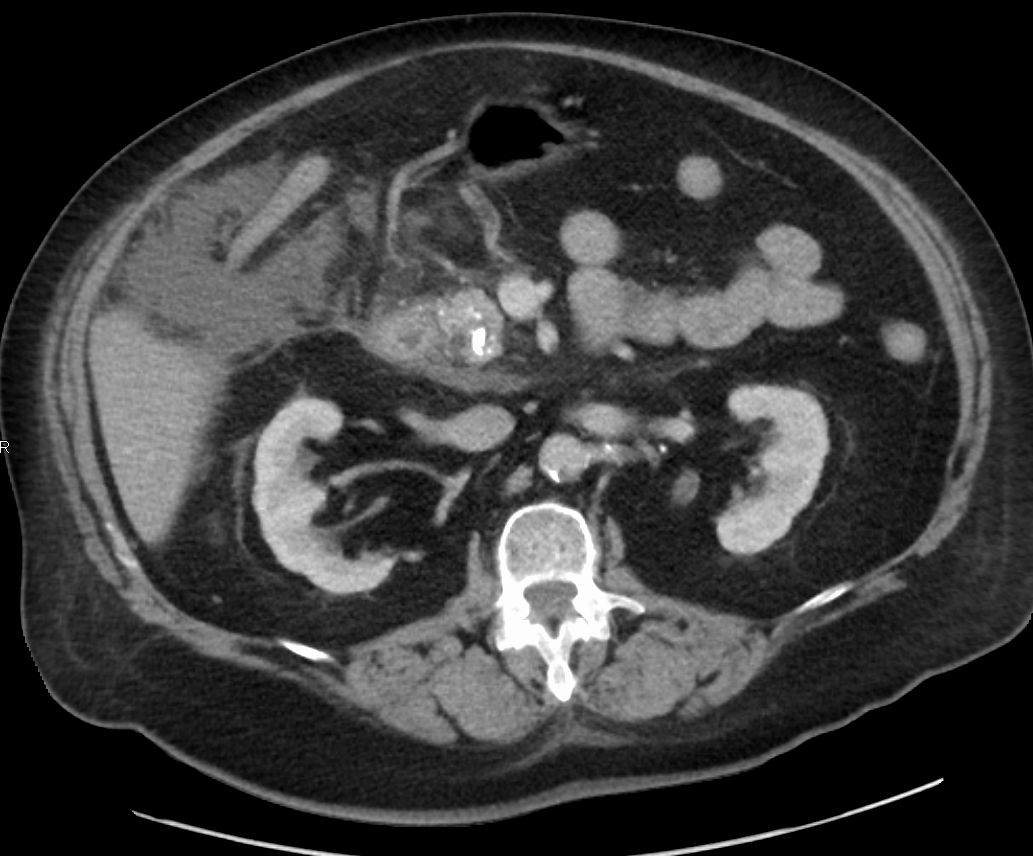
Calcified pancreatic duct stones with some free intra-abdominal fluid

The differential diagnosis for pancreatitis includes but is not limited to cholecystitis, choledocholithiasis, perforated peptic ulcer, bowel infarction, small bowel obstruction, hepatitis, and mesenteric ischemia.

Diagnosis requires 2 of the 3 following criteria:

- Characteristic acute onset of epigastric or vague abdominal pain that may radiate to the back (see signs and symptoms above)
- Serum amylase or lipase levels ≥ 3 times the upper limit of normal
- An imaging study with characteristic changes. CT, MRI, abdominal ultrasound, or endoscopic ultrasound can be used for diagnosis.

Amylase and lipase are 2 enzymes produced by the pancreas. Elevations in lipase are generally considered a better indicator for pancreatitis as it has greater specificity and a longer half-life. However, both enzymes can be elevated in other disease states. In chronic pancreatitis, the fecal pancreatic elastase-1 (FPE-1) test is a marker of exocrine pancreatic function. Additional tests that may be useful in evaluating chronic pancreatitis include hemoglobin A1C, immunoglobulin G4, rheumatoid factor, and anti-nuclear antibody.

For imaging, abdominal ultrasound is convenient, simple, non-invasive, and inexpensive. It is more sensitive and specific for pancreatitis from gallstones than other imaging modalities. However, in 25–35% of patients the view of the pancreas can be obstructed by bowel gas making it difficult to evaluate.

A contrast-enhanced CT scan is usually performed more than 48 hours after the onset of pain to evaluate for pancreatic necrosis and extrapancreatic fluid as well as predict the severity of the disease. CT scanning earlier can be falsely reassuring.

ERCP or an endoscopic ultrasound can also be used if a biliary cause for pancreatitis is suspected.

== Treatment ==
The treatment for acute pancreatitis will depend on whether the diagnosis is mild pancreatitis, which typically resolves without treatment, or the severe form, which can cause serious complications. Patients with mild AP should still be hospitalized, at least briefly, to receive IV fluids and clinical monitoring.

=== Pain management ===
Acute pancreatitis typically presents with severe to extreme abdominal pain. While the mildest cases of pancreatitis may be managed exclusively with NSAIDs (which are preferred in such scenarios due to the anti-inflammatory effects and the better safety profile), most patients with pancreatitis require heavy opioid regimens for pain therapy. Severe cases often require continuous IV infusions of opioid medications. It is appropriate for emergent cases of pancreatitis to be treated with these medications immediately, rather than attempting to control the pain with lesser medications first.

The early use of strong pain management therapies does not affect the ability of the physician to diagnose the cause of severe abdominal pain. Thus, pain management should not be reduced or withheld for diagnosis in cases of suspected pancreatitis.

=== Fluid resuscitation ===
Regardless of disease severity, moderately aggressive fluid resuscitation is advisable for all patients with acute pancreatitis, especially if they can be diagnosed and treated early in the course of the disease. The preferred fluid for administration is lactated Ringer solution, but saline may also be used. Patients with acute pancreatitis of any severity are typically hypovolemic (decreased blood volume), and this hypovolemia can result in hypoperfusion of pancreatic cells. Without an adequate blood supply, pancreatic cells can become necrotic, resulting in tissue death, which can be further worsened by the strong inflammatory response that occurs following necrosis.

=== Managing infection ===
Infection is a major cause of mortality in patients with pancreatitis, and these patients are prone to infections in a variety of organ systems. The majority of patients with pancreatitis have damage to the gut barrier, allowing gut bacteria to bypass this barrier and cause infection. Some species of gut bacteria are also known to detect pancreatitis and respond by releasing their own pro-inflammatory molecules. Conversely, a healthy microbiome is beneficial for preventing infection, and several gut bacteria are known to augment human immune defenses and reduce systemic inflammation.

=== Mild acute pancreatitis ===
The treatment of mild acute pancreatitis is admission to a general hospital ward for fluid resuscitation and patient monitoring. Traditionally, people were not allowed to eat until the inflammation resolved, but more recent evidence suggests early feeding is safe and improves outcomes and may result in an ability to leave the hospital sooner, and guidelines have been updated to recommend early feeding for patients able to tolerate it.

Opioids may be used for pain. When the pancreatitis is due to gallstones, or even for patients without gallstones and no other identifiable cause, early gallbladder removal also appears to improve outcomes.

=== Severe acute pancreatitis ===
Severe pancreatitis can cause organ failure, necrosis, infected necrosis, pseudocyst, and abscess. If diagnosed with severe acute pancreatitis, people will need to be admitted to a high-dependency unit or intensive care unit. The levels of fluids inside the body will likely have dropped significantly as it diverts bodily fluids and nutrients to repair the pancreas. A drop in fluid levels can lead to a rapid and severe reduction in blood volume, which is known as hypovolemic shock. This condition represents a major life threat and may be prevented in some cases by prompt and aggressive fluid resuscitation.

Patients with severe AP are often unable to receive oral nutrition, and so nasogastric feeding tubes are commonly used for these patients. Feeding tubes may be used to provide calories and nutrients, combined with appropriate analgesia. Early enteral feeding within 48 hours of admission to the hospital has been associated with better outcomes.

The systemic inflammatory response may inflame the lungs and manifest as acute respiratory distress syndrome (ARDS). Supplemental oxygen is frequently required in the treatment of severe AP. A patient may require respiratory support ranging from supplemental oxygen via nasal cannula to full mechanical ventilation. In many cases, even the most intensive respiratory therapies are not enough, and many patients with severe pancreatitis die as a result of respiratory failure.

As with mild pancreatitis, it will be necessary to treat the underlying cause—gallstones, discontinuing medications, cessation of alcohol, etc. If the cause is gallstones, an ERCP procedure or removal of the gallbladder will likely be recommended. There is also evidence that, even for patients without gallstones, surgical removal of the gallbladder may reduce the risk of recurrence. As of 2024, guidelines recommend the procedure for any patient with severe pancreatitis with no clear cause.

If the cause of pancreatitis is alcohol, cessation of alcohol consumption and treatment for alcohol dependency may improve pancreatitis. Even if the underlying cause is not related to alcohol consumption, many doctors recommend avoiding it for at least six months as this can cause further damage to the pancreas during the recovery process. Patients whose pancreatitis can be linked to alcoholism are known to have a much higher risk of recurrence.

== Prognosis ==
Severe acute pancreatitis has mortality rates around 2–9%, higher where necrosis of the pancreas has occurred.

Several scoring systems are used to predict the severity of pancreatitis. They each combine demographic and laboratory data to estimate severity or probability of death. Examples include APACHE II, Ranson, BISAP, and Glasgow. The Modified Glasgow criteria suggests that a case be considered severe if at least three of the following are true:

- Age > 55 years
- Blood levels:
  - PO2 oxygen < 60 mmHg or 7.9 kPa
  - White blood cells > 15,000/μL
  - Calcium < 2 mmol/L
  - Blood urea nitrogen > 16 mmol/L
  - Lactate dehydrogenase (LDH) > 600iu/L
  - Aspartate transaminase (AST) > 200iu/L
  - Albumin < 3.2g/L
  - Glucose > 10 mmol/L

This can be remembered using the mnemonic PANCREAS:

- PO2 oxygen < 60 mmHg or 7.9 kPa
- Age > 55
- Neutrophilia white blood cells > 15,000/μL
- Calcium < 2 mmol/L
- Renal function (BUN) > 16 mmol/L
- Enzymes lactate dehydrogenase (LDH) > 600iu/L aspartate transaminase (AST) > 200iu/L
- Albumin < 3.2g/L
- Sugar glucose > 10 mmol/L

The BISAP score (blood urea nitrogen level >25 mg/dL (8.9 mmol/L), impaired mental status, systemic inflammatory response syndrome, age over 60 years, pleural effusion) has been validated as similar to other prognostic scoring systems.

== Epidemiology ==
Globally, the incidence of acute pancreatitis is 5 to 35 cases per 100,000 people. The incidence of chronic pancreatitis is 4–8 per 100,000, with a prevalence of 26–42 cases per 100,000. In 2013 pancreatitis resulted in 123,000 deaths up from 83,000 deaths in 1990.

== Costs ==
In adults in the United Kingdom, the estimated average total direct and indirect costs from chronic pancreatitis is roughly £79,000 per person annually. Acute recurrent pancreatitis and chronic pancreatitis occur infrequently in children, but are associated with high healthcare costs due to substantial disease burden. Globally, the estimated average total cost of treatment for children with these conditions is approximately $40,500/person/year.

== Other animals ==
Fatty foods may cause canine pancreatitis in dogs.

== See also ==
- Exocrine pancreatic insufficiency
- Chronic pancreatitis
