= Enteropeptidase =

Enzyme found in humans

TMPRSS15

Identifiers
- Aliases: TMPRSS15, ENTK, PRSS7, transmembrane protease, serine 15, transmembrane serine protease 15, Enteropeptidase, Proenterokinase
- External IDs: OMIM: 606635; MGI: 1197523; GeneCards: TMPRSS15
Available structures
| PDB | Ortholog search: PDBe RCSB |
| PDB | List of PDB id codes 4DGJ |
Enzyme activity
| EC # | BRENDA | ExPASy | KEGG | MetaCyc |
|---|---|---|---|---|
| 3.4.21.9 | ↗ | ↗ | ↗ | ↗ |

Gene location (Human)
| Chr. | Chromosome 21 (human) |
| Band | 21q21.1 | Start | 18,269,116 bp |
| Band | 21q21.1 | End | 18,485,879 bp |

Gene location (Mouse)
| Chr. | Chromosome 16 (mouse) |
| Band | 16|16 C3.1- C3.2 | Start | 78,749,896 bp |
| Band | 16|16 C3.1- C3.2 | End | 78,887,985 bp |
RNA expression pattern
| Bgee | Human / Mouse (ortholog); Top expressed in: jejunal mucosa; duodenum; olfactory bulb; beta cell; pancreatic ductal cell; buccal mucosa cell; testicle; mucosa of ileum; tibialis anterior muscle; deltoid muscle / Top expressed in: duodenum; duodenal epithelium; parasympathetic nervous system; thyroid gland; pharynx; tongue; jejunum; choroid plexus of fourth ventricle; spermatid; colon; More reference expression data |
| BioGPS | n/a |
Gene ontology
| Molecular function | scavenger receptor activity; peptidase activity; serine-type peptidase activity; protein binding; hydrolase activity; serine-type endopeptidase activity |
| Cellular component | integral component of membrane; membrane; brush border |
| Biological process | receptor-mediated endocytosis; proteolysis; vesicle-mediated transport; endocytosis |
Sources:Amigo / QuickGO
Orthologs
| Databases | NCBI: entry; OMA: entry |
| Species | Human | Mouse |
| Entrez | 5651 | 19146 |
| Ensembl | ENSG00000154646 | ENSMUSG00000022857 |
| UniProt | P98073 | P97435 |
| RefSeq (mRNA) | NM_002772 | NM_008941; NM_178855 |
| RefSeq (protein) | NP_002763 | NP_032967; NP_849186 |
| Location (UCSC) | Chr 21: 18.27 – 18.49 Mb | Chr 16: 78.75 – 78.89 Mb |
| PubMed search |
- Wikidata
| View/Edit Human | View/Edit Mouse |

enteropeptidase
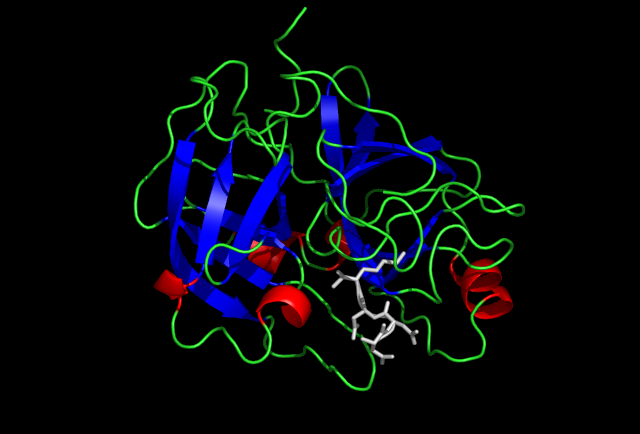
- Crystal structure of Enteropeptidase with an inhibitor

Identifiers
- EC no.: 3.4.21.9
- CAS no.: 9014-74-8

Databases
- BRENDA: enzyme data
- ExPASy: NiceZyme view
- KEGG: enzyme entry
- MetaCyc: metabolic pathway
- Rhea: reactions
- PDB structures: RCSB PDB PDBe PDBsum
- Gene Ontology: AmiGO / QuickGO
Search
- PMC: articles
- PubMed: articles
- NCBI: proteins

Enteropeptidase (also called enterokinase) is an enzyme that in humans is encoded by the gene TMPRSS15. It is produced by cells of the duodenum and is involved in digestion in humans and other animals. Enteropeptidase converts trypsinogen (a zymogen) into its active form trypsin, resulting in the subsequent activation of digestive enzymes from the pancreas. Absence of enteropeptidase results in intestinal digestion impairment.

Enteropeptidase is a serine protease (EC 3.4.21.9) consisting of a disulfide-linked heavy-chain of 82-140 kDa that anchors enterokinase in the intestinal brush border membrane and a light-chain of 35–62 kDa that contains the catalytic subunit. Enteropeptidase is a part of the chymotrypsin-clan of serine proteases, and is structurally similar to these proteins.

== Gene ==
In humans, enteropeptidase is encoded by the TMPRSS15 gene (also known as ENTK, and previously as PRSS7) on chromosome 21q21.

== Structure ==
Enteropeptidase is a type II transmembrane serine protease (TTSP) localized to the brush border of the duodenal and jejunal mucosa and synthesized as a zymogen, proenteropeptidase, which requires activation by duodenase or trypsin. TTSPs are synthesized as single chain zymogens with N-terminal propeptide sequences of different lengths. These enzymes are activated by cleavage at the carboxyl side of lysine or arginine residues present in a highly conserved activation motif. Once activated, TTSPs are predicted to remain membrane-bound through a conserved disulfide bond linking the pro- and catalytic domains.

In the case of cattle enteropeptidase the primary translation product comprises 1035 residues with an expected mass of 114.9 kDa. The detected apparent mass of about 160 kDa is consistent with the specified carbohydrate content of 30 - 40%, with equal amounts of neutral and amino sugars. The activation cleavage site after Lys800 splits the heavy and light chains of mature cattle enteropeptidase. There are 17 potential N-linked glycosylation sites in the heavy chain and three in the light chain; most of these are conserved in other species.

The heavy chain has a hydrophobic section near the N-terminus that supports the transmembrane anchor. The heavy chain influences the specificity of enteropeptidase. Native enteropeptidase is resistant to soybean trypsin inhibitor. However, the isolated light chain is subtle whether prepared by limited reduction of the natural protein or by mutagenesis and expression in COS cells. Native enteropeptidase and the isolated light chain have similar activity toward Gly-(Asp)4-Lys-NHNap, but the secluded light chain has distinctly decreased activity toward trypsinogen . An analogous selective defect in the recognition of trypsinogen can be produced in two-chain enteropeptidase by heating or by acetylation. This behavior implies that the catalytic center and one or more secondary substrate-binding sites are essential for optimal recognition of trypsinogen.

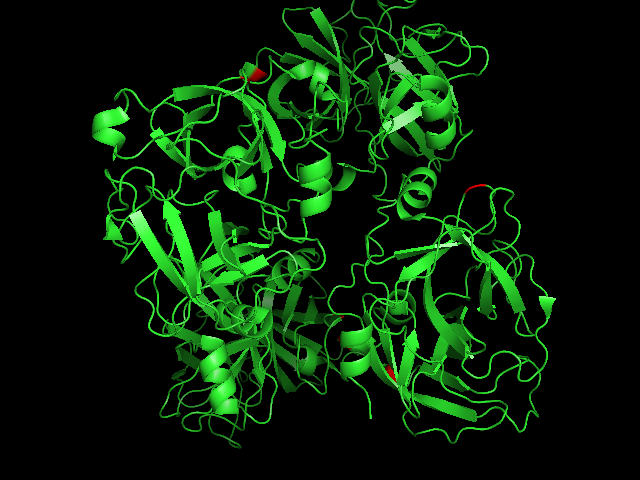
Human enteropeptidase - light chain

== Function ==
Despite its alternative name (enterokinase), enteropeptidase is a serine protease that catalyses the hydrolysis of peptide bonds in proteins and, unlike other kinases, does not catalyze transfer of phosphate groups. Enteropeptidase exhibits trypsin-like activity, cleaving proteins following a lysine at a specific cleavage site (Asp-Asp-Asp-Asp-Lys). This cleavage results in trypsindependent activation of other pancreatic zymogens, such as chymotrypsinogen, proelastase, procarboxypeptidase and prolipase in the lumen of the gut. As the pro-region of trypsinogen contains this sequence, enteropeptidase catalyses its activation in vivo:

trypsinogen → trypsin + pro-region (Val-Asp-Asp-Asp-Asp-Lys)

== Clinical significance ==
Some nonsense and frameshift mutations in TMPRSS15 lead to a rare recessive disorder characterised by severe failure to thrive in affected infants, due to enteropeptidase deficiency. Enteropeptidase mRNA expression is limited to the proximal small intestine, and the protein is found in enterocytes of duodenum and proximal jejunum. Upon secretion from the pancreas into the duodenum, trypsinogen encounters enteropeptidase and is activated. Trypsin then cleaves and activates other pancreatic serine protease zymogens (chymotrypsinogen and proelastases), metalloprotease zymogens (procarboxypeptidases) and prolipases. By means of this simple two-step cascade, the destructive activity of these digestive hydrolases is confined to the lumen of the intestine. The physiological importance of this pathway is demonstrated by the severe intestinal malabsorption caused by congenital deficiency of enteropeptidase. This condition can be life-threatening, but responds to oral supplementation with pancreatic extract.

== Applications ==
Enteropeptidase's specificity makes it an ideal tool in biochemical applications; a fusion protein containing a C-terminal affinity tag (such as poly-His) linked by this sequence can be cleaved by enteropeptidase to obtain the target protein following protein purification. On the converse, the N-terminal pro-sequence of proteases that must be cleaved prior to activation can be mutated to enable activation with enteropeptidase.

== Historical significance ==
Enteropeptidase was discovered by Ivan Pavlov, who was awarded the 1904 Nobel Prize in Physiology or Medicine for his studies of gastrointestinal physiology. It is the first known enzyme to activate other enzymes, and it remains a remarkable example of how serine proteases have been crafted to regulate metabolic pathways. The inert function of digestive enzymes within the pancreas was known, as compared to their potent activity within the intestine, but the basis of this difference was unknown. In 1899, Pavlov's student, N. P. Schepowalnikov, demonstrated that canine duodenal secretions dramatically stimulated the digestive activity of pancreatic enzymes, especially trypsinogen. The active principle was recognized as a special enzyme in the intestine that could activate other enzymes. Pavlov named it enterokinase. The debate of whether enterokinase was a cofactor or enzyme was resolved by Kunitz, who showed that the activation of trypsinogen by enterokinase was catalytic. In the 1950s, cattle trypsinogen was shown to be activated autocatalytically by cleavage of an N-terminal hexapeptide. The more precise IUBMB name enteropeptidase has been in existence since 1970. However, the original name ‘enterokinase’ has a long history and remains in common use.
