= Trypsin-2 =

Protein-coding gene in the species Homo sapiens

PRSS2

Identifiers
- Aliases: PRSS2, TRY2, TRY8, TRYP2, protease, serine 2, serine protease 2
- External IDs: OMIM: 601564; MGI: 102759; GeneCards: PRSS2
Enzyme activity
EC #	BRENDA	ExPASy	KEGG	MetaCyc
3.4.21.4	↗	↗	↗	↗

Gene location (Human)
Chr.	Chromosome 7 (human)
Band	7q34	Start	142,760,398 bp
Band	7q34	End	142,774,564 bp

Gene location (Mouse)
Chr.	Chromosome 6 (mouse)
Band	6|6 B1	Start	41,498,721 bp
Band	6|6 B1	End	41,502,013 bp
RNA expression pattern
Bgee	Human / Mouse (ortholog); Top expressed in: body of pancreas; islet of Langerhans; duodenum; testicle; fundus; ectocervix; right coronary artery; body of stomach; canal of the cervix; right uterine tube / Top expressed in: pyloric antrum; islet of Langerhans; pancreatic acinus; duodenum; sexually immature organism; mucous cell of stomach; masseter muscle; intercostal muscle; brown adipose tissue; quadriceps femoris muscle; More reference expression data
BioGPS	n/a
Gene ontology
Molecular function	calcium ion binding; peptidase activity; protein binding; hydrolase activity; metal ion binding; serine-type endopeptidase activity; serine-type peptidase activity; metalloendopeptidase activity
Cellular component	extracellular matrix; extracellular region; extracellular space; azurophil granule lumen
Biological process	collagen catabolic process; digestion; positive regulation of cell growth; extracellular matrix disassembly; proteolysis; positive regulation of cell adhesion; antimicrobial humoral response; neutrophil degranulation
Sources:Amigo / QuickGO
Orthologs
Databases	NCBI: entry; OMA: entry
Species	Human	Mouse
Entrez	5645	22072
Ensembl	ENSG00000282049; ENSG00000275896	ENSMUSG00000057163
UniProt	P07478	P07146
RefSeq (mRNA)	NM_001303414; NM_002770	NM_009430
RefSeq (protein)	NP_001290343; NP_002761	NP_033456
Location (UCSC)	Chr 7: 142.76 – 142.77 Mb	Chr 6: 41.5 – 41.5 Mb
PubMed search
- Wikidata
View/Edit Human	View/Edit Mouse

Trypsin-2 (also called serine protease 2) is an enzyme that in humans is encoded by the PRSS2 gene. Trypsin-2 is a digestive enzyme which functions to break down proteins as a protease. Like other trypsins it is secreted in its inactive, trypsinogen form by the acinar cells of the pancreas into the small intestines as part of pancreatic juice. It is distinctive in its potential ability to degrade type II collagen, which may be connected to rheumatoid arthritis.

== Function ==
This gene encodes a trypsinogen, which is a member of the trypsin family of serine proteases. This enzyme is secreted by the pancreas and cleaved to its active form in the small intestine. It is active on peptide linkages involving the carboxyl group of lysine or arginine. This gene and several other trypsinogen genes are localized to the T cell receptor beta locus on chromosome 7. [provided by RefSeq, Jul 2008].
