= Trypsinogen =

Precursor form of trypsin, a digestive enzyme

Trypsinogen (/ˌtrɪpˈsɪnədʒən, -ˌdʒɛn/) is the precursor form (or zymogen) of trypsin, a digestive enzyme. It is produced by the pancreas and found in pancreatic juice, along with amylase, lipase, and chymotrypsinogen. It is cleaved to its active form, trypsin, by enteropeptidase, which is found in the intestinal mucosa. Once activated, the trypsin can cleave more trypsinogen into trypsin, a process called autoactivation. Trypsin cleaves the peptide bond on the carboxyl side of basic amino acids such as arginine and lysine.

== Function ==
Trypsinogen is the proenzyme precursor of trypsin. Trypsinogen (the inactive form) is stored in the pancreas so that it may be released when required for protein digestion. The pancreas stores the inactive form trypsinogen because the active trypsin would cause severe damage to the tissue of the pancreas. Trypsinogen is released by the pancreas into the second part of the duodenum, via the pancreatic duct, along with other digestive enzymes.

== Activation of trypsinogen ==
Trypsinogen is activated by enteropeptidase (also known as enterokinase). Enteropeptidase is produced by the mucosa of duodenum and it cleaves the peptide bond of trypsinogen after residue 15, which is a lysine. The N-terminal peptide is discarded, and a slight rearrangement of the folded protein occurs. The newly formed N-terminal residue (residue 16) inserts into a cleft, where its α-amino group forms an ion pair with the aspartate near the active site serine, and results in the conformational rearrangement of other residues. The amino group of Gly 193 orientates itself into the correct position, which completes the oxyanion hole in active site, thereby activating the protein. Since trypsin also cleaves the peptide bond after an arginine or a lysine, it can cleave other trypsinogen, and the activation process therefore becomes autocatalytic.

== Safeguards against trypsinogen activation ==
Trypsin is produced, stored and released as the inactive trypsinogen to ensure that the protein is only activated in the appropriate location. Premature trypsin activation can be destructive and may trigger a series of events that lead to pancreatic self-digestion. In normal pancreas, around 5% of trypsinogens are thought to get activated, therefore there are a number of defenses against such inappropriate activation. Trypsinogen is produced by the acinar cells of the pancreas and stored in intracellular vesicles called zymogen granules. The membranous walls of these vesicles are thought to be resistant to enzymatic degradation. A further safeguard against inappropriate trypsin activation is the presence of inhibitors such as bovine pancreatic trypsin inhibitor (BPTI) and serine protease inhibitor Kazal-type 1 (SPINK1), which binds to any trypsin formed. Trypsin autocatalytic activation of trypsinogen is also a slow process due to the presence of a large negative charge on the conserved N-terminal hexapeptide of trypsinogen, which repels the aspartate on the back of trypsin's specificity pocket. Trypsin may also inactivate other trypsin by cleavage.

== Serum trypsinogen ==
Serum trypsinogen is measured using a blood test. High levels are seen in acute pancreatitis and cystic fibrosis.

== Trypsinogen isoforms ==
Three isoforms of trypsinogens may be found in human pancreatic juice. These are the cationic (trypsin-1), anionic (trypsin-2), and meso (trypsin-3) trypsinogen, and they account for 23.1%, 16%, and 0.5% of total pancreatic secretory proteins, respectively. Other forms of trypsinogen have been found in other organisms.

== Diseases ==
The inappropriate activation of trypsinogen in the pancreas can lead to pancreatitis. Some type of pancreatitis may be associated with mutant forms of trypsinogen. A mutation at Arg 117, a trypsin-sensitive site, in cationic trypsinogen has been implicated in hereditary pancreatitis, a rare form of early-onset genetic disorder. Arg 117 may be a fail-safe mechanism by which trypsin, when activated within the pancreas, may become inactivated, and loss of this cleavage site would result in a loss of control and permit autodigestion resulting in pancreatitis. Other mutations have also been found that are linked to pancreatitis.
