= Digestive enzyme =

Class of enzymes

Digestive enzymes take part in the chemical process of digestion, which follows the mechanical process of digestion. Food consists of macromolecules of proteins, carbohydrates, and fats that need to be broken down chemically by digestive enzymes in the mouth, stomach, pancreas, and duodenum, before being able to be absorbed into the bloodstream. Initial breakdown is achieved by chewing (mastication) and the use of digestive enzymes of saliva. Once in the stomach further mechanical churning takes place mixing the food with secreted gastric juice. Digestive gastric enzymes take part in some of the chemical process needed for absorption. Most of the enzymatic activity, and hence absorption takes place in the duodenum.

Digestive enzymes are found in the digestive tracts of animals (including humans) and in the tracts of carnivorous plants, where they aid in the digestion of food, as well as inside cells, especially in their lysosomes, where they function to maintain cellular survival.

Digestive enzymes are classified based on their target substrates: lipases split fatty acids into fats and oils; proteases and peptidases split proteins into small peptides and amino acids; amylases split carbohydrates such as starch and sugars into simple sugars such as glucose, and nucleases split nucleic acids into nucleotides.

== Types ==
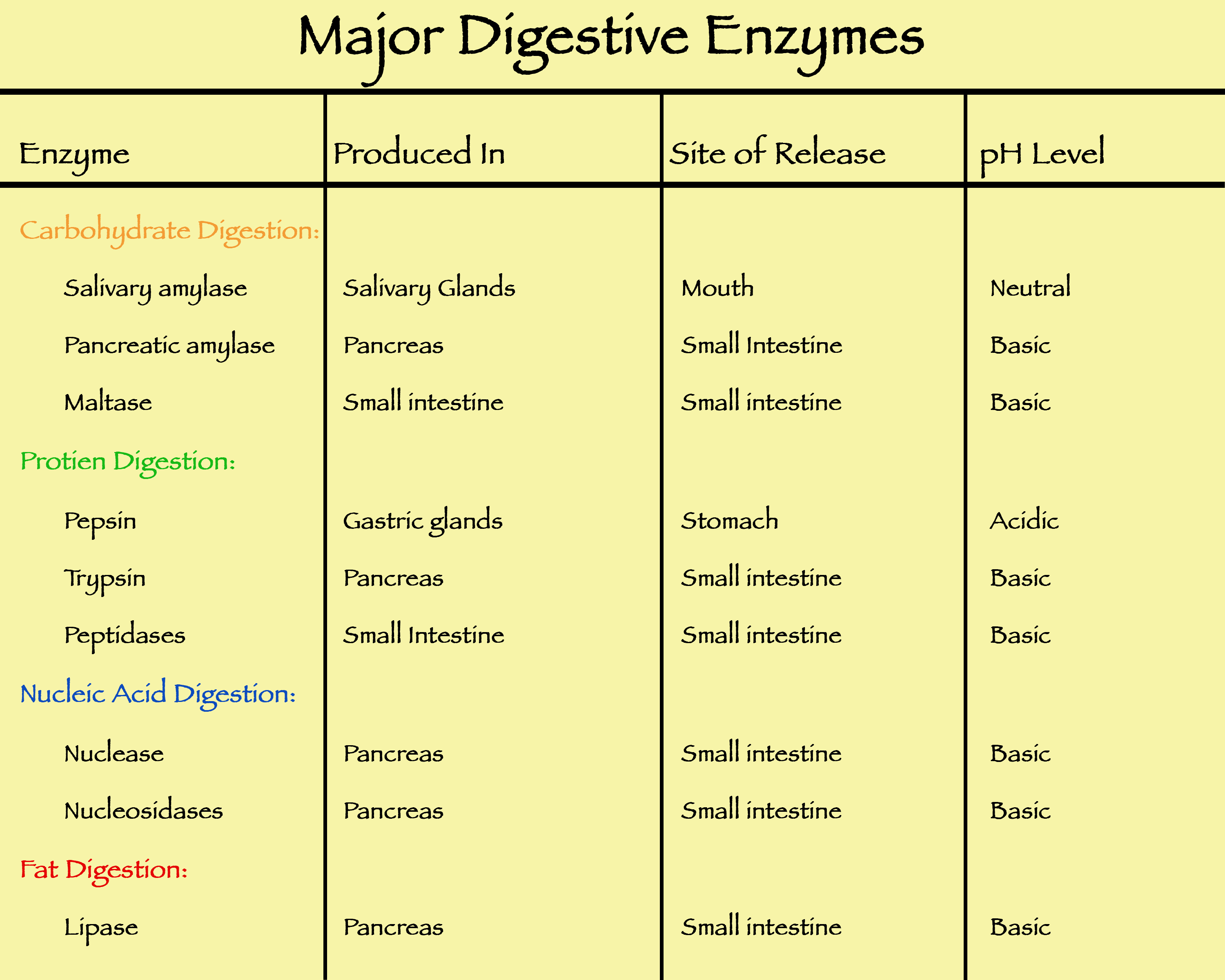
Table of the different major digestive enzymes

Digestive enzymes are found throughout much of the gastrointestinal tract. In the human digestive system, the main sites of digestion are the mouth, stomach, and small intestine. Digestive enzymes are secreted by different exocrine glands including salivary glands, gastric glands, secretory cells in the pancreas, and secretory glands in the small intestine. In some carnivorous plants plant-specific digestive enzymes are used to break down their captured organisms.

=== Mouth ===
Complex food substances that are eaten must be broken down into simple, soluble, and diffusible substances before they can be absorbed. In the oral cavity, salivary glands secrete an array of enzymes and substances that aid in digestion and also disinfection. They include the following:

- Lingual lipase: in certain non-human animals like mice and rats, lipid digestion initiates in the mouth. Lingual lipase (homologous to human Gastric lipase) starts the digestion of the lipids/fats.
- Salivary amylase: Carbohydrate digestion also initiates in the mouth. Amylase, produced by the salivary glands, breaks complex carbohydrates, mainly cooked starch, to smaller chains, or even simple sugars. It is sometimes referred to as ptyalin.
- Lysozyme: Considering that food contains more than just essential nutrients, e.g. bacteria or viruses, the lysozyme offers a limited and non-specific, yet beneficial antiseptic function in digestion.

There are two types of salivary glands:

- Serous glands: These glands produce a secretion rich in water, electrolytes, and enzymes. A great example of a serous oral gland is the parotid gland.
- Mixed glands: These glands have both serous cells and mucous cells, and include sublinguinal and submandibular glands. Their secretion is mucinous and highly viscous.

=== Stomach ===
The enzymes that are secreted in the stomach are gastric enzymes. The stomach plays a major role in digestion, both in a mechanical sense by mixing and crushing the food, and also in an enzymatic sense, by digesting it. The following are enzymes produced by the stomach and their respective function:

- Pepsin is the main gastric enzyme. It is produced in the stomach by gastric chief cells in its inactive form pepsinogen, which is a zymogen. Pepsinogen is then activated by the stomach acid into its active form, pepsin. Pepsin breaks down the protein in the food into smaller particles, such as peptide fragments and amino acids. Protein digestion, therefore, primarily starts in the stomach, unlike carbohydrate and lipids, which start their digestion in the mouth (however, trace amounts of the enzyme kallikrein, which catabolises certain protein, is found in saliva in the mouth).
- Gastric lipase: Gastric lipase is an acidic lipase secreted by the gastric chief cells in the fundic mucosa of the stomach. It has a pH level of 3–6. Gastric lipase, together with lingual lipase, comprise the two acidic lipases. These lipases, unlike alkaline lipases (such as pancreatic lipase), do not require bile acid or colipase for optimal enzymatic activity. Acidic lipases make up 30% of lipid hydrolysis occurring during digestion in the human adult, with gastric lipase contributing the most of the two acidic lipases. In neonates, acidic lipases are much more important, providing up to 50% of total lipolytic activity.
- Cathepsin F: is a cysteine protease.

=== Pancreas ===
The pancreas is both an endocrine, and an exocrine gland, in that it functions to produce endocrinic hormones released into the circulatory system (such as insulin, and glucagon), to control glucose metabolism, and also to secrete digestive / exocrinic pancreatic juice, which is secreted eventually via the pancreatic duct into the duodenum. Digestive or exocrine function of pancreas is as significant to the maintenance of health as its endocrine function.

Two of the population of cells in the pancreatic tissue make up its digestive enzymes:

- Ductal cells: Mainly responsible for production of bicarbonate (HCO_{3}), which acts to neutralize the acidity of the stomach chyme entering duodenum through the pylorus. Ductal cells of the pancreas are stimulated by the hormone secretin to produce their bicarbonate-rich secretions, in what is in essence a bio-feedback mechanism; highly acidic stomach chyme entering the duodenum stimulates duodenal cells called "S cells" to produce the hormone secretin and release to the bloodstream. Secretin having entered the blood eventually comes into contact with the pancreatic ductal cells, stimulating them to produce their bicarbonate-rich juice. Secretin also inhibits production of gastrin by "G cells", and also stimulates acinar cells of the pancreas to produce their pancreatic enzyme.
- Acinar cells: Mainly responsible for production of both active and inactive pancreatic enzymes (zymogens) that, once present in the small bowel, become activated and perform their major digestive functions by breaking down proteins, fat, and DNA/RNA. Acinar cells are stimulated by cholecystokinin (CCK), which is a hormone/neurotransmitter produced by the intestinal cells (I cells) in the duodenum. CCK stimulates production of the pancreatic zymogens.

Pancreatic juice, composed of the secretions of both ductal and acinar cells, contains the following digestive enzymes:

- Trypsinogen, which is an inactive (zymogenic) protease that, once activated in the duodenum into trypsin, breaks down proteins at the basic amino acids. Trypsinogen is activated via the duodenal enzyme enterokinase into its active form trypsin.
- Chymotrypsinogen, which is an inactive (zymogenic) protease that, once activated by activated by trypsin, turns into chymotrypsin and breaks down proteins at their aromatic amino acids.
- Carboxypeptidase, which is a protease that takes off the terminal amino acid group from a protein
- Several elastases that degrade the protein elastin and some other proteins
- Pancreatic lipase that degrades triglycerides into two fatty acids and a monoglyceride
- Sterol esterase
- Phospholipase
- Several nucleases that degrade nucleic acids, like DNAase and RNAase
- Pancreatic amylase that breaks down starch and glycogen which are alpha-linked glucose polymers. Humans lack the cellulases to digest the carbohydrate cellulose which is a beta-linked glucose polymer.

Some of the preceding endogenous enzymes have pharmaceutical counterparts (pancreatic enzymes) that are administered to people with exocrine pancreatic insufficiency.

The pancreas's exocrine function owes part of its notable reliability to biofeedback mechanisms controlling secretion of the juice. The following significant pancreatic biofeedback mechanisms are essential to the maintenance of pancreatic juice balance/production:

- Secretin, a hormone produced by the duodenal "S cells" in response to the stomach chyme containing high hydrogen atom concentration (high acidity), is released into the blood stream; upon return to the digestive tract, secretion decreases gastric emptying, increases secretion of the pancreatic ductal cells, as well as stimulating pancreatic acinar cells to release their zymogenic juice.
- Cholecystokinin (CCK) is a unique peptide released by the duodenal "I cells" in response to chyme containing high fat or protein content. Unlike secretin, which is an endocrine hormone, CCK actually works via stimulation of a neuronal circuit, the end-result of which is stimulation of the acinar cells to release their content. CCK also increases gallbladder contraction, resulting in bile squeezed into the cystic duct, common bile duct and eventually the duodenum. Bile of course helps absorption of the fat by emulsifying it, increasing its absorptive surface. Bile is made by the liver, but is stored in the gallbladder.
- Gastric inhibitory peptide (GIP) is produced by the mucosal duodenal cells in response to chyme containing high amounts of carbohydrate, proteins, and fatty acids. Main function of GIP is to decrease gastric emptying.
- Somatostatin is a hormone produced by the mucosal cells of the duodenum and also the "delta cells" of the pancreas. Somatostatin has a major inhibitory effect, including on pancreatic production.

=== Duodenum ===
The following enzymes/hormones are produced in the duodenum:

- secretin: This is an endocrine hormone produced by the duodenal "S cells" in response to the acidity of the gastric chyme.
- cholecystokinin (CCK) is a unique released by the duodenal "I cells" in response to chyme containing high fat or protein content. Unlike secretin, which is an endocrine hormone, CCK actually works via stimulation of a neuronal circuit, the end-result of which is stimulation of the acinar cells to release their content. CCK also increases gallbladder contraction, causing release of pre-stored bile into the cystic duct, and eventually into the common bile duct and via the ampulla of Vater into the second anatomic position of the duodenum. CCK also decreases the tone of the sphincter of Oddi, which is the sphincter that regulates flow through the ampulla of Vater. CCK also decreases gastric activity and decreases gastric emptying, thereby giving more time to the pancreatic juices to neutralize the acidity of the gastric chyme.
- Gastric inhibitory peptide (GIP): This peptide decreases gastric motility and is produced by duodenal mucosal cells.
- motilin: This substance increases gastro-intestinal motility via specialized receptors called "motilin receptors".
- somatostatin: This hormone is produced by duodenal mucosa and also by the delta cells of the pancreas. Its main function is to inhibit a variety of secretory mechanisms.

Throughout the lining of the small intestine there are numerous brush border enzymes whose function is to further break down the chyme released from the stomach into absorbable particles. These enzymes are absorbed whilst peristalsis occurs. Some of these enzymes include:

- Various exopeptidases and endopeptidases including dipeptidase and aminopeptidases that convert peptones and polypeptides into amino acids.
- Maltase: converts maltose into glucose.
- Lactase: This is a significant enzyme that converts lactose into glucose and galactose. A majority of Middle-Eastern and Asian populations lack this enzyme. This enzyme also decreases with age. As such lactose intolerance is often a common abdominal complaint in the Middle-Eastern, Asian, and older populations, manifesting with bloating, abdominal pain, and osmotic diarrhea.
- Sucrase: converts sucrose into glucose and fructose.
- Other disaccharidases

=== Plants ===
In carnivorous plants, digestive enzymes and acids break down insects and in some plants small animals. In some plants, the leaf collapses on the prey to increase contact, others have a small vessel of digestive liquid. Then digestion fluids are used to digest the prey to get at the needed nitrates and phosphorus. The absorption of the needed nutrients are usually more efficient than in other plants. Digestive enzymes independently came about in carnivorous plants and animals.

Some carnivorous plants like the Heliamphora do not use digestive enzymes, but use bacteria to break down the food. These plants do not have digestive juices, but use the rot of the prey.

Some carnivorous plants digestive enzymes:

- Hydrolytic process
- Esterase a hydrolase enzyme
- Proteases enzyme
- Nucleases enzyme
- Phosphatases enzyme
- Glucanases enzyme
- Peroxidases enzyme
- Ureas an organic compounds
- Chitinase enzyme

== Clinical significance ==
Alpha-glucosidase inhibitors and alpha amylase inhibitors are found in several raw plants such as cinnamon. They are used as anti-diabetic drugs. Studies have shown that the use of raw cinnamon offers potential anti-diabetic therapeutic use.

Digestive enzymes are marketed as supplements intended to reduce symptoms like bloating. These can be efficacious as treatments when individuals have specific conditions leading to a lack of endogenous productions, as with lactase for individuals who are lactose intolerant and with pancreatic exocrine insufficiency. However, there is little evidence that they are effective more generally.

== See also ==
- Acarbose
- Alpha-glucosidase
- Erepsin
