= Zinc carboxypeptidase =

Identifiers
- Symbol: Peptidase_M14
- Pfam: PF00246
- InterPro: IPR000834
- PROSITE: PDOC00123
- SCOP2: 1cbx / SCOPe / SUPFAM
- CDD: cd00596
Available protein structures:
- PDB: 1jqgA:127-412 2c1cA:128-415 1heeE:128-406 2abzA:128-406 1ellP:128-406 1cps :128-406 1bavD:128-406 1m4lA:128-406 1zlhA:128-406 4cpaB:128-406 1hduD:128-406 7cpa :128-406 1cpxA:128-406 1f57A:128-406 2ctb :128-406 1arm :128-406 5cpa :128-406 3cpaA:128-406 1ee3P:128-406 1yme :128-406 1cbx :128-406 1hdqA:128-406 1pytB:128-406 8cpa :128-406 6cpa :128-406 1iy7A:128-406 2ctc :128-406 1elmP:128-406 1arl :128-406 2boaB:129-408 1ayeA:127-404 1dtdA:127-404 1zg9C:125-404 1zg8A:125-404 1z5rA:125-404 1nsa :125-404 1zliA:125-404 1kwmA:125-404 1obr :113-402 1uwyA:28-303 1h8lA:16-291 IPR000834 PF00246 (ECOD; PDBsum)
- AlphaFold: IPR000834; PF00246

The carboxypeptidase A family can be divided into two subfamilies: carboxypeptidase H (regulatory) and carboxypeptidase A (digestive). Members of the H family have longer C-termini than those of family A, and carboxypeptidase M (a member of the H family) is bound to the membrane by a glycosylphosphatidylinositol anchor, unlike the majority of the M14 family, which are soluble.

The zinc ligands have been determined as two histidines and a glutamate, and the catalytic residue has been identified as a C-terminal glutamate, but these do not form the characteristic metalloprotease HEXXH motif. Members of the carboxypeptidase A family are synthesised as inactive molecules with propeptides that must be cleaved to activate the enzyme. Structural studies of carboxypeptidases A and B reveal the propeptide to exist as a globular domain, followed by an extended alpha-helix; this shields the catalytic site, without specifically binding to it, while the substrate-binding site is blocked by making specific contacts.

Other examples of protein families in this entry include:

- Intron maturase
- Putative mitochondrial processing peptidase alpha subunit
- Superoxide dismutase [Mn] (EC 1.15.1.1)
- Asparagine synthetase [glutamine-hydrolysing] 3 (EC 6.3.5.4)
- Glucose-6-phosphate isomerase (EC 5.3.1.9)

== Human proteins containing this domain ==
AEBP1; AGBL1; AGBL2; AGBL3; AGBL4; AGBL5; AGTPBP1; CPA1; CPA2; CPA3; CPA4; CPA5; CPA6; CPB1; CPB2; CPD; CPE; CPM; CPN1; CPO; CPXM1; CPXM2; CPZ;
