= Carboxypeptidase A =

Protein family

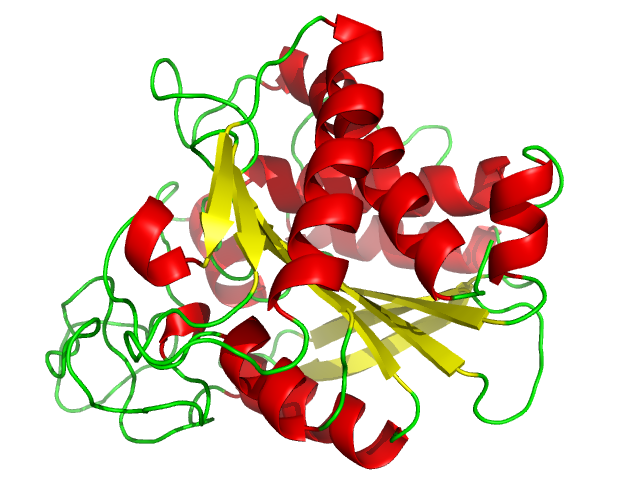
- Carboxypeptidase A, from bovine pancreas

Identifiers
- EC no.: 3.4.17.1
- CAS no.: 9031-98-5

Databases
- BRENDA: enzyme data
- ExPASy: NiceZyme view
- KEGG: enzyme entry
- MetaCyc: metabolic pathway
- Rhea: reactions
- PDB structures: RCSB PDB PDBe PDBsum
- Gene Ontology: AmiGO / QuickGO
Search
- PMC: articles
- PubMed: articles
- NCBI: proteins

Carboxypeptidase A usually refers to the pancreatic exopeptidase that hydrolyzes peptide bonds of C-terminal residues with aromatic or aliphatic side-chains. Most scientists in the field now refer to this enzyme as CPA1, and to a related pancreatic carboxypeptidase as CPA2.

== Types ==
In addition, there are 4 other mammalian enzymes named CPA-3 through CPA-6, and none of these are expressed in the pancreas. Instead, these other CPA-like enzymes have diverse functions.

- CPA3 (also known as mast-cell CPA) is involved in the digestion of proteins by mast cells.
- CPA4 (previously known as CPA-3, but renumbered when mast-cell CPA was designated CPA-3) may be involved in tumor progression, but this enzyme has not been well studied.
- CPA5 has not been well studied.
- CPA6 is expressed in many tissues during mouse development, and in adult shows a more limited distribution in brain and several other tissues. CPA6 is present in the extracellular matrix where it is enzymatically active. A human mutation of CPA-6 has been linked to Duane's syndrome (abnormal eye movement). Recently, mutations in CPA6 were found to be linked to epilepsy. CPA6 is also one of several enzymes which degrade enkephalins.

== Function ==
CPA-1 and CPA-2 (and, it is presumed, all other CPAs) employ a zinc ion within the protein for hydrolysis of the peptide bond at the C-terminal end of an amino acid residue. Loss of the zinc leads to loss of activity, which can be replaced easily by zinc, and also by some other divalent metals (cobalt, nickel). Carboxypeptidase A is produced in the pancreas and is crucial to many processes in the human body to include digestion, post-translational modification of proteins, blood clotting, and reproduction.

== Applications ==
This vast scope of functionality for a single protein makes it the ideal model for research regarding other zinc proteases of unknown structure. Recent biomedical research on collagenase, enkephalinase, and angiotensin-converting enzyme used carboxypeptidase A for inhibitor synthesis and kinetic testing. For example, a drug that treats high blood pressure, Captopril, was designed based on a carboxypeptidase A inhibitor. Carboxypeptidase A and the target enzyme of Captopril, angiotensin-converting enzyme, have very similar structures, as they both contain a zinc ion within the active site. This allowed for a potent carboxypeptidase A inhibitor to be used to inhibit the enzyme and, thus, lower blood pressure through the renin-angiotensin-aldosterone system.

== Structure ==
Carboxypeptidase A (CPA) contains a zinc (Zn^{2+}) metal center in a tetrahedral geometry with amino acid residues in close proximity around zinc to facilitate catalysis and binding. Out of the 307 amino acids bonded in a peptide chain, the following amino acid residues are important for catalysis and binding; Glu-270, Arg-71, Arg-127, Asn-144, Arg-145, and Tyr-248. Figure 1 illustrates the tetrahedral zinc complex active site with the important amino acid residues that surround the complex.

The zinc metal is a strong electrophilic Lewis acid catalyst which stabilizes a coordinated water molecule as well as stabilizes the negative intermediates that occur throughout the hydrolytic reaction. Stabilization of both the coordinated water molecule and negative intermediates are assisted by polar residues in the active site which are in close proximity to facilitate hydrogen bonding.

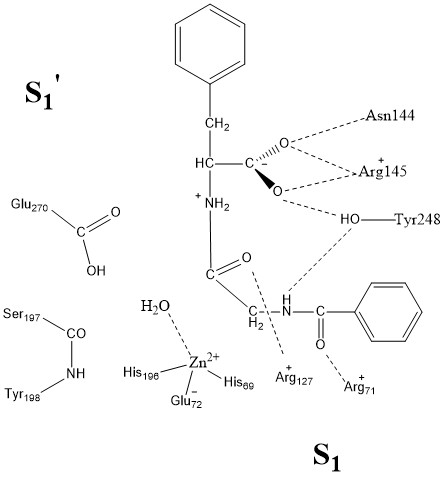
Figure 1. CPA Active Site

The active site can be characterized into two sub-sites denoted as S_{1}’ and S_{1}. The S_{1}’ sub-site is the hydrophobic pocket of the enzyme, and Tyr-248 acts to ‘cap’ the hydrophobic pocket after substrate or inhibitor is bound (SITE). The hydrogen bonding from the hydroxyl group in Tyr-248 facilitates this conformation due to interaction with the terminal carboxylates of substrates that bind. Substantial movement is required for this enzyme and induced fit model explains how this interaction occurs.

A triad of residues interact to the C-terminal carboxylate through hydrogen bonding:

- Salt linkage with positively charged Arg-145
- Hydrogen bond from Tyr-248
- Hydrogen bond from the nitrogen of the Asn-144 amide

== Mechanism ==
Classified as a metalloexopeptidase, carboxypeptidase A consists of a single polypeptide chain bound to a zinc ion. This characteristic metal ion is located within the active site of the enzyme, along with five amino acid residues that are involved in substrate binding: Arg-71, Arg-127, Asn-144, Arg-145, Tyr-248, and Glu-270. X-ray crystallographic studies have revealed five subsites on the protein. These allosteric sites are involved in creating the ligand-enzyme specificity seen in most bioactive enzymes. One of these subsites induces a conformational change at Tyr-248 upon binding of a substrate molecule at the primary active site. The phenolic hydroxyl of tyrosine forms a hydrogen bond with the terminal carboxylate of the ligand. In addition, a second hydrogen bond is formed between the tyrosine and a peptide linkage of longer peptide substrates. These changes make the bond between the enzyme and ligand, whether it is substrate or inhibitor, much stronger. This property of carboxypeptidase A led to the first clause of Daniel E. Koshland, Jr.’s “induced fit” hypothesis.

The S_{1} sub-site is where catalysis occurs in CPA, and the zinc ion is coordinated by Glu-72, His-69, and His-196 enzyme residues. A plane exists that bisects the active-site groove where residues Glu-270 and Arg-127 are on opposite sides of the zinc-water coupled complex. The zinc is electron rich due to glutamine ligands coordinating the zinc because before substrate binds, Glu-72 coordinates bidentate but shifts to monodentate after substrate binds. As a result, the zinc metal is not able to deprotonate the coordinated water molecule to make a hydroxyl nucleophile.

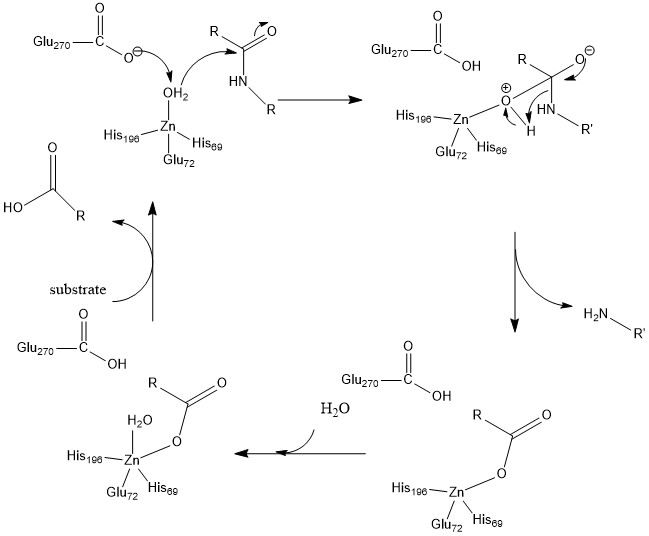
Figure 2. CPA-Catalyzed proteolysis promoted by coordinated water molecule.

Glu-270 and Arg-127 play an important role in catalysis shown in Figure 2. Arg-127 acts to stabilize the carbonyl of the substrate that is bound to amino group of phenylalanine. Simultaneously, the water molecule coordinated to zinc is deprotonated by Glu-270 and interacts with the carbonyl stabilized by Arg-127. This creates an intermediate, shown in Figure 2, where the negatively charged oxygen is coordinated to zinc, and through unfavorable electrostatic interactions between Glu-270 and the ionized product facilitates the release of the product at the end of catalysis.

In recent computational studies, the mechanism of catalysis is similar but the difference in mechanism is that deprotonated water molecule binds to the carbon of the carbonyl, whereas Figure 2 shows the hydroxyl group stays coordinated to zinc. Then proteolysis occurs and the water molecule is then introduced back into the active site to coordinate to zinc.

Several studies have been conducted exploring the details of the bond between carboxypeptidase A and substrate and how this affects the rate of hydrolysis. In 1934, it was first discovered through kinetic experiments that, in order for substrate to bind, the peptide that is to be hydrolyzed must be adjacent to a terminal free hydroxyl group. Also, the rate of hydrolysis can be enhanced if the C-terminal residue is branched aliphatic or aromatic. However, if the substrate is a dipeptide with a free amino group, it undergoes hydrolysis slowly; this, however, can be avoided if the amino group is blocked by N-acylation.

It is quite clear that the structure of the enzyme, to be specific the active site, is very important in understanding the mechanism of reaction. For this reason, Rees and colleagues studied the enzyme-ligand complex to get a clear answer for the role of the zinc ion. These studies found that, in free enzyme, the zinc coordination number is five; the metal center is coordinated with two imidazole Nδ1 nitrogens, the two carboxylate oxygens of glutamate-72, and a water molecule to form a distorted tetrahedral. However, once ligand binds at the active site of carboxypeptidase A, this coordination number can vary from five to six. When bound to dipeptide glycyl-L-tyrosine, the amino nitrogen of the dipeptide and the carbonyl oxygen replaced the water ligand. This would yield a coordination number of six for the zinc in the carboxypeptidase A- dipeptide glycyl-L-tyrosine complex. Electron density maps gave evidence that the amino nitrogen occupies a second position near glutamate-270. The closeness of these two residues would result in a steric hindrance preventing the water ligand from coordinating with zinc. This would result in a coordination number of five. Data for both are substantial, indicating that both situations occur naturally.

There are two proposed mechanisms for the catalytic function of carboxypeptidase A. The first is a nucleophilic pathway involving a covalent acyl enzyme intermediate containing active site base Glu-270. Evidence for this anhydride intermediate is mixed; Suh and colleagues isolated what is assumed to by the acyl intermediate. However, confirmation of the acyl enzyme was done without trapping experiments, making the conclusions weak.

The second proposed mechanism is a promoted water pathway. This mechanism involves attack of a water molecule at the scissile peptide linkage of the substrate. This process is promoted by the zinc ion and assisted by residue Glu-270.

== See also ==
- Carboxypeptidase A inhibitor
- Carboxypeptidase B
- Carboxypeptidase
- Carboxypeptidase E
