= Latexin family =

Family of proteins

Latexin
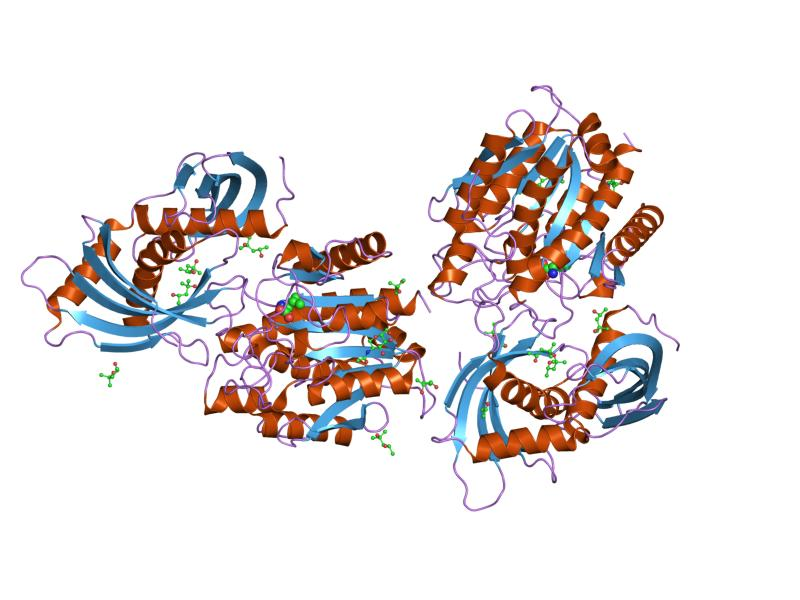
- human carboxypeptidase a4 in complex with human latexin.

Identifiers
- Symbol: Latexin
- Pfam: PF06907
- InterPro: IPR009684
- MEROPS: I47
Available protein structures:
- PDB: IPR009684 PF06907 (ECOD; PDBsum)
- AlphaFold: IPR009684; PF06907

In molecular biology, the latexin family is a family of proteins which consists of several animal specific latexin and proteins related to latexin that belong to MEROPS proteinase inhibitor family I47, clan IH. In humans, it consists of the proteins Latexin (LXN) and Retinoic acid receptor responder protein 1 (RARRES1).

Latexin, a protein possessing inhibitory activity against rat carboxypeptidase A1 (CPA1) and CPA2 (MEROPS peptidase family M14A), is expressed in a neuronal subset in the cerebral cortex and cells in other neural and non-neural tissues of rat. OCX-32, the 32 kDa eggshell matrix protein, is present at high levels in the uterine fluid during the terminal phase of eggshell formation, and is localised predominantly in the outer eggshell. The timing of OCX-32 secretion into the uterine fluid suggests that it may play a role in the termination of mineral deposition. OCX-32 protein possesses limited identity (32%) to two unrelated proteins: latexin and to a skin protein that is encoded by a retinoic acid receptor-responsive gene, TIG1. Tazarotene Induced Gene 1 (TIG1) is a putative transmembrane protein with a small N-terminal intracellular region, a single membrane-spanning hydrophobic region, and a large C-terminal extracellular region containing a glycosylation signal. TIG1 is up-regulated by retinoic acid receptor but not by retinoid X receptor-specific synthetic retinoids. TIG1 may be a tumour suppressor gene whose diminished expression is involved in the malignant progression of prostate cancer.
