= Pro X (disambiguation) =

Pro X or Pro-X may refer to:

== Television ==
- Pro Arena, a Romanian TV channel formerly named Pro X
- Pro X, a Kohavision TV show

== Biology ==
- Cytosol nonspecific dipeptidase, an enzyme also known as Pro-X dipeptidase
- Lysosomal Pro-X carboxypeptidase, an enzyme
- Membrane Pro-X carboxypeptidase, an enzyme
- Prolyl aminopeptidase, an enzyme also known as Pro-X aminopeptidase

== Software ==
- Modbook Pro X, a type of tablet computer
- Final Cut Pro X, a non-linear video editing application
- Logic Pro X, a digital audio workstation
- Samplitude Pro X, a version of the Magix Samplitude digital audio workstation
- Video Pro X, a video editor by Magix
- Snapz Pro X, a utility computer application
- Xara Designer Pro X, a version of the Xara Photo & Graphic Designer image editing program

== Technology ==
- Korg Triton Pro X, a version of the Korg Triton music workstation synthesizer
- Razor Pro X, a RazorUSA kick scooter model
- Telstra Wi-Fi 4G Advanced Pro X, a mobile broadband device
