= Carboxypeptidase D (disambiguation) =

Term carboxypeptidase D may refer to:

- Carboxypeptidase, a generic enzyme class
- Carboxypeptidase D, the EC 3.4.16.6 enzyme class
- Metallocarboxypeptidase D, the EC 3.4.17.22 enzyme class
