= CPA3 =

Enzyme found in humans

Identifiers
- Aliases: CPA3, MC-CPA, carboxypeptidase A3
- External IDs: OMIM: 114851; MGI: 88479; GeneCards: CPA3
Enzyme activity
EC #	BRENDA	ExPASy	KEGG	MetaCyc
3.4.17.1	↗	↗	↗	↗

Gene location (Human)
Chr.	Chromosome 3 (human)
Band	3q24	Start	148,865,296 bp
Band	3q24	End	148,897,203 bp

Gene location (Mouse)
Chr.	Chromosome 3 (mouse)
Band	3 A2|3 6.25 cM	Start	20,269,784 bp
Band	3 A2|3 6.25 cM	End	20,296,345 bp
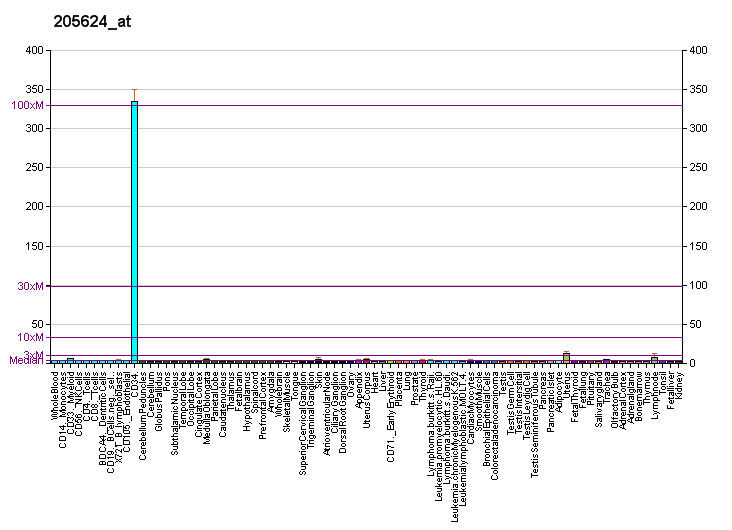
RNA expression pattern
Bgee	Human / Mouse (ortholog); Top expressed in: gallbladder; skin of hip; skin of thigh; rectum; visceral pleura; right lung; mucosa of ileum; upper lobe of left lung; right coronary artery; lower lobe of lung / Top expressed in: dermis; umbilical cord; tunica adventitia of aorta; skin of abdomen; skin of external ear; ankle; vas deferens; skin of back; lip; human fetus; More reference expression data
BioGPS	More reference expression data
Gene ontology
Molecular function	metal ion binding; carboxypeptidase activity; zinc ion binding; peptidase activity; hydrolase activity; metallopeptidase activity; metallocarboxypeptidase activity
Cellular component	transport vesicle; secretory granule; cytoplasmic vesicle; extracellular space; extracellular matrix; extracellular region; collagen-containing extracellular matrix
Biological process	regulation of angiotensin levels in blood; angiotensin maturation; proteolysis
Sources:Amigo / QuickGO
Orthologs
Databases	NCBI: entry; OMA: entry
Species	Human	Mouse
Entrez	1359	12873
Ensembl	ENSG00000163751	ENSMUSG00000001865
UniProt	P15088	P15089
RefSeq (mRNA)	NM_001870	NM_007753
RefSeq (protein)	NP_001861	NP_031779
Location (UCSC)	Chr 3: 148.87 – 148.9 Mb	Chr 3: 20.27 – 20.3 Mb
PubMed search
- Wikidata
View/Edit Human	View/Edit Mouse

Carboxypeptidase A3 (mast cell carboxypeptidase A), also known as CPA3, is an enzyme which in humans is encoded by the CPA3 gene. The "CPA3" gene expression has only been detected in mast cells and mast-cell-like lines, and CPA3 is located in secretory granules. CPA3 is one of 8-9 members of the A/B subfamily that includes the well-studied pancreatic enzymes carboxypeptidase A1 (CPA1), carboxypeptidase A2 (CPA2), and carboxypeptidase B. This subfamily includes 6 carboxypeptidase A-like enzymes, numbered 1-6. The enzyme now called CPA3 was originally named mast cell carboxypeptidase A, and another protein was initially called CPA3. A gene nomenclature committee renamed mast cell carboxypeptidase A as CPA3, and the original CPA3 reported by Huang et al. became CPA4 to reflect the order of their discovery.

== Structure ==
=== Gene ===
The "CPA3" gene is a 32kb-gene located at chromosome 3q24, consisting of 11 exons.

=== Protein ===
CPA3 shares significant homology with the CPA subfamily of metalloprecarboxypeptidases and all the residues essential for the coordination of the Zn^{2+} active site, substrate peptide anchoring, and CP activity are preserved in the putative CPA3 protein. It resembles pancreatic CPA1 in cleaving C-terminal aromatic and aliphatic amino acid residues.CPA3 contains an N-terminal sequence of 16 amino acids and a pro-peptide between the NH2-terminal signal peptide sequence and COOH-terminal CP moiety.

== Function ==
CPA3 has a pH optimum in the neutral to basic range. CPA3 functions together with endopeptidases secreted from mast cells such as chymases and tryptases to degrade proteins and peptides, including the apolipoprotein B component of LDL particles and angiotensin I. Upon mast cell activation and degranulation, CPA3, the chymases, and tryptases are released in complexes with heparin proteoglycan. The parasitic nematode Ascaris produces CPA3 inhibitors, which increase its survival during infection. This finding implies that CPA3 might be involved in host defense against certain parasites. CPA3 is also reported to have an important role in the protection towards snake venom toxins and vasoconstricting peptide endothelin 1(ET1).

== Clinical significance ==
CPA3 provides protection from ET-1-induced damage, suggesting CPA3 could have a role in regulating sepsis. The involvement of CPA3 in autoimmune disease models makes it a potential diagnostic parameter of related diseases. The significantly increased concentration of CPA3 in drug-induced anaphylaxis also implies that CPA3 could serve as a diagnostic parameter and detection of it could improve the forensic identification. A new mast cell subtype reported to appear in mucosa is implicated in allergic inflammation and these mast cells have high levels of CPA3. The highly upregulated transcript of CPA3 is readily detected in luminal brushings and biopsies, making it a useful biomarker of allergic inflammation.

== Interactions ==
CPA3 has been known to interact with:

- Heparin
- PCI
- SR48692
- Tissue carboxypeptidase inhibitor
- Neurotensin
