= Potato carboxypeptidase inhibitor =

Potato carboxypeptidase inhibitor (PCI) is a naturally occurring protease inhibitor peptide in potatoes that can form complexes with several metallo-carboxypeptidases, inhibiting them in a strong competitive way with a Ki in the nanomolar range.^{a}
PCI consists of 39 amino acids (MW 4295 Da) forming a 27-residue globular core stabilized by three disulfide bridges and a C-terminal tail with residues 35–39. PCI contains a small cysteine-rich module, called a T-knot scaffold, that is shared by several different protein families, including the EGF family.^{a}

== Medicinal properties ==
Because of the structural similarities with EGF, PCI inhibits tumor cell growth.^{a} Mechanism of action is inhibition of receptor dimerization and receptor trans-autophosphorylation induced by epidermal growth factor (EGF). PCI blocks the formation and activation of ErbB1/ErbB-2 (EGFR and HER2) heterodimers that have a prominent role in carcinoma development.^{a}
PCI also inhibits transforming growth factor alpha (TGF-alpha). In addition for pancreatic enzymes carboxypeptidase A and B, PCI also inhibits carboxypeptidase R without affecting the activity of carboxypeptidase N in the circulation and have therefore use in thrombolytic therapy (blood clot lysis).^{a}

== See also ==
Scaffold (disambiguation)
Protein kinase
Chemotherapy
Thrombolysis
Cancer research
