= Carboxypeptidase P =

The term carboxypeptidase P may refer to:

- Lysosomal Pro-X carboxypeptidase
- Membrane Pro-X carboxypeptidase
