= AMZ1 =

Protein-coding gene in the species Homo sapiens

Identifiers
- Aliases: AMZ1, archaelysin family metallopeptidase 1
- External IDs: OMIM: 615168; MGI: 2442258; GeneCards: AMZ1

Gene location (Human)
Chr.	Chromosome 7 (human)
Band	7p22.3	Start	2,679,522 bp
Band	7p22.3	End	2,775,500 bp

Gene location (Mouse)
Chr.	Chromosome 5 (mouse)
Band	5|5 G2	Start	140,709,882 bp
Band	5|5 G2	End	140,747,194 bp
RNA expression pattern
Bgee	Human / Mouse (ortholog); Top expressed in: testicle; amygdala; stromal cell of endometrium; gonad; prefrontal cortex; nucleus accumbens; sural nerve; anterior cingulate cortex; mesencephalon; substantia nigra / Top expressed in: dentate gyrus of hippocampal formation granule cell; granulocyte; superior frontal gyrus; right kidney; ventricular zone; morula; spleen; embryo; embryo; primary visual cortex; More reference expression data
BioGPS	n/a
Gene ontology
Molecular function	metal ion binding; metallopeptidase activity; hydrolase activity; zinc ion binding; peptidase activity
Cellular component	cellular component
Biological process	proteolysis
Sources:Amigo / QuickGO
Orthologs
Databases	NCBI: entry; OMA: entry
Species	Human	Mouse
Entrez	155185	231842
Ensembl	ENSG00000174945	ENSMUSG00000050022
UniProt	Q400G9	Q8BVF9
RefSeq (mRNA)	NM_001284355; NM_133463; NM_001321766; NM_001384739; NM_001384740 NM_001384741; NM_001384742; NM_001384743	NM_173405
RefSeq (protein)	NP_001271284; NP_001308695; NP_597720	NP_775581
Location (UCSC)	Chr 7: 2.68 – 2.78 Mb	Chr 5: 140.71 – 140.75 Mb
PubMed search
- Wikidata
View/Edit Human	View/Edit Mouse

AMZ1, also known as archaelysin family metallopeptidase 1, is a metallopeptidase that in humans is encoded by the AMZ1 gene. AMZ1 is one of two members of the M54 metallopeptidase family.
