= ATP23 =

Protein-coding gene in the species Homo sapiens

Identifiers
- Aliases: ATP23, KUB3, XRCC6BP1, ATP23 metallopeptidase and ATP synthase assembly factor homolog (S. cerevisiae), ATP23 metallopeptidase and ATP synthase assembly factor homolog
- External IDs: MGI: 1916984; GeneCards: ATP23

Gene location (Human)
Chr.	Chromosome 12 (human)
Band	12q14.1	Start	57,906,039 bp
Band	12q14.1	End	57,959,148 bp

Gene location (Mouse)
Chr.	Chromosome 10 (mouse)
Band	10|10 D3	Start	126,704,296 bp
Band	10|10 D3	End	126,737,224 bp
RNA expression pattern
Bgee	Human / Mouse (ortholog); Top expressed in: right testis; left testis; mucosa of transverse colon; gonad; muscle of thigh; gastrocnemius muscle; skeletal muscle tissue; bone marrow; granulocyte; monocyte / Top expressed in: embryo; embryo; yolk sac; spermatid; right kidney; primary oocyte; endocardial cushion; spermatocyte; epiblast; neural tube; More reference expression data
BioGPS	n/a
Gene ontology
Molecular function	peptidase activity; metalloendopeptidase activity; DNA-dependent protein kinase activity; hydrolase activity; metallopeptidase activity; metal ion binding
Cellular component	DNA-dependent protein kinase-DNA ligase 4 complex; plasma membrane; intracellular membrane-bounded organelle; cytosol; cell junction; extrinsic component of mitochondrial inner membrane
Biological process	double-strand break repair via nonhomologous end joining; proteolysis; protein phosphorylation; mitochondrial proton-transporting ATP synthase complex assembly; mitochondrial protein processing
Sources:Amigo / QuickGO
Orthologs
Databases	NCBI: entry; OMA: entry
Species	Human	Mouse
Entrez	91419	68876
Ensembl	ENSG00000262145; ENSG00000166896	ENSMUSG00000025436
UniProt	Q9Y6H3	Q9CWQ3
RefSeq (mRNA)	NM_033276; NM_001320408; NM_001320409; NM_001320410	NM_001159559; NM_026858; NM_001358969; NM_001358970
RefSeq (protein)	NP_001307337; NP_001307338; NP_001307339; NP_150592	NP_001153031; NP_081134; NP_001345898; NP_001345899
Location (UCSC)	Chr 12: 57.91 – 57.96 Mb	Chr 10: 126.7 – 126.74 Mb
PubMed search
- Wikidata
View/Edit Human	View/Edit Mouse

ATP23, also known as ATP23 metallopeptidase and ATP synthase assembly factor homolog, is a DNA-dependent protein kinase and metalloendopeptidase that in humans is encoded by the ATP23 gene.

ATP23 is the only member of the M76 metallopeptidase family. ATP23 is involved in double-strand break repair (DSB), with higher ATP23 expression increasing the efficiency of the repair. ATP23 has been characterized in yeast, where it is reportedly found in the mitochondrial intermembrane space and is known to associate with the mitochondrial inner membrane. ATP23 acts as a molecular chaperone during the assembly of ATP synthase, and is known to process the N-terminal propeptide of ATP synthase. ATP23 is also known to act alongside Yme1 to degrade Ups1.
