= CPXM1 =

Protein-coding gene in humans

Identifiers
- Aliases: CPXM1, CPX1, CPXM, carboxypeptidase X (M14 family), member 1, carboxypeptidase X, M14 family member 1
- External IDs: OMIM: 609555; MGI: 1934569; GeneCards: CPXM1

Gene location (Human)
Chr.	Chromosome 20 (human)
Band	20p13	Start	2,794,074 bp
Band	20p13	End	2,800,627 bp

Gene location (Mouse)
Chr.	Chromosome 2 (mouse)
Band	2|2 F1	Start	130,232,695 bp
Band	2|2 F1	End	130,239,494 bp
RNA expression pattern
Bgee	Human / Mouse (ortholog); Top expressed in: decidua; gallbladder; cartilage tissue; canal of the cervix; ectocervix; smooth muscle tissue; body of uterus; parietal pleura; left uterine tube; ganglionic eminence / Top expressed in: calvaria; epithelium of lens; external carotid artery; mesenteric lymph nodes; efferent ductule; dermis; body of femur; sciatic nerve; Gonadal ridge; vestibular sensory epithelium; More reference expression data
BioGPS	n/a
Gene ontology
Molecular function	carboxypeptidase activity; zinc ion binding; peptidase activity; hydrolase activity; metallopeptidase activity; metal ion binding; metallocarboxypeptidase activity; serine-type carboxypeptidase activity
Cellular component	extracellular region; extracellular space
Biological process	protein processing; peptide metabolic process; proteolysis
Sources:Amigo / QuickGO
Orthologs
Databases	NCBI: entry; OMA: entry
Species	Human	Mouse
Entrez	56265	56264
Ensembl	ENSG00000088882	ENSMUSG00000027408
UniProt	Q96SM3	Q9Z100
RefSeq (mRNA)	NM_019609; NM_001184699	NM_019696
RefSeq (protein)	NP_001171628; NP_062555	NP_062670
Location (UCSC)	Chr 20: 2.79 – 2.8 Mb	Chr 2: 130.23 – 130.24 Mb
PubMed search
- Wikidata
View/Edit Human	View/Edit Mouse

Probable carboxypeptidase X1 is an enzyme that in humans is encoded by the CPXM1 gene.

The protein encoded by this gene is a member of the M14 family of zinc carboxypeptidases; however, the protein has no detectable carboxypeptidase activity. The encoded protein is thought to be an extracellular and/or membrane protein, and may be involved in cell-cell interactions.
