= Streptomyces roseoviridis =

Scientific classification
- Domain: Bacteria
- Kingdom: Bacillati
- Phylum: Actinomycetota
- Class: Actinomycetes
- Order: Streptomycetales
- Family: Streptomycetaceae
- Genus: Streptomyces
- Species: S. roseoviridis

Binomial name
- Streptomyces roseoviridis Pridham et al. 1958

Type strain
- ATCC 23959, BCRC 13779, CBS 942.68, CCRC 13779, CGMCC 4.1803, CGMCC 4.1922, DSM 40175, ETH 24184, IFO 12911, INA 3617, ISP 5175, ISP 5715, JCM 4414, KCC S-0414, KCCS-0414, LMG 20266, NBRC 12911, NCIMB 13012, NCIMB B-2730, NRRL B-2730, NRRL-ISP 5175, RIA 1135, VKM Ac-943

Synonyms
- Actinomyces roseoviridis

Species of bacterium

Streptomyces roseoviridis is a bacterium species from the genus of Streptomyces which has been isolated from soil. Streptomyces roseoviridis produces histargin, an inhibitor of carboxypeptidase B.

== See also ==
- List of Streptomyces species
