= Carboxypeptidase A6 =

Protein-coding gene in the species Homo sapiens

CPA6

Identifiers
- Aliases: CPA6, CPAH, ETL5, FEB11, carboxypeptidase A6
- External IDs: OMIM: 609562; MGI: 3045348; GeneCards: CPA6

Gene location (Human)
Chr.	Chromosome 8 (human)
Band	8q13.2	Start	67,422,038 bp
Band	8q13.2	End	67,746,378 bp

Gene location (Mouse)
Chr.	Chromosome 1 (mouse)
Band	1|1 A2	Start	10,394,945 bp
Band	1|1 A2	End	10,790,170 bp
RNA expression pattern
Bgee	Human / Mouse (ortholog); Top expressed in: buccal mucosa cell; mucosa of transverse colon; urethra; rectum; epithelium of colon; prostate; vagina; tibia; mucosa of sigmoid colon; smooth muscle tissue / Top expressed in: otolith organ; utricle; calvaria; lumbar subsegment of spinal cord; tail of embryo; spermatid; inferior olivary nucleus; umbilical cord; seminiferous tubule; stroma of bone marrow; More reference expression data
BioGPS	n/a
Gene ontology
Molecular function	carboxypeptidase activity; zinc ion binding; peptidase activity; hydrolase activity; metallopeptidase activity; metal ion binding; metallocarboxypeptidase activity
Cellular component	extracellular region; extracellular space
Biological process	proteolysis
Sources:Amigo / QuickGO
Orthologs
Databases	NCBI: entry; OMA: entry
Species	Human	Mouse
Entrez	57094	329093
Ensembl	ENSG00000165078	ENSMUSG00000042501
UniProt	Q8N4T0	Q5U901
RefSeq (mRNA)	NM_001127445; NM_020361	NM_001289497; NM_177834
RefSeq (protein)	NP_065094	NP_001276426; NP_808502
Location (UCSC)	Chr 8: 67.42 – 67.75 Mb	Chr 1: 10.39 – 10.79 Mb
PubMed search
- Wikidata
View/Edit Human	View/Edit Mouse

Carboxypeptidase A6 (CPA6) is a metallocarboxypeptidase enzyme that in humans is encoded by the CPA6 gene.

== Tissue distribution ==
It is highly expressed in the adult mouse olfactory bulb and is broadly expressed in the embryonic brain and other tissues.

== Function ==
The protein encoded by this gene belongs to the family of carboxypeptidases, which catalyze the release of C-terminal amino acid, and have functions ranging from digestion of food to selective biosynthesis of neuroendocrine peptides.

CPA6 processes several neuropeptides, including [Met]- and [Leu]-enkephalin, angiotensin I, and neurotensin in vitro. Whereas CPA6 is capable of converting the enkephalins and neurotensin into inactive forms, it can convert the inactive angiotensin I into the active angiotensin II. CPA6 may have additional roles in processing peptides and proteins in vivo, but the nature of these substrates and the effects of these cleavages are currently unknown.

== Clinical significance ==
Polymorphic variants and a reciprocal translocation t(6;8)(q26;q13) involving this gene, have been associated with Duane retraction syndrome.

== See also ==
- Carboxypeptidase A inhibitor
- Carboxypeptidase
