= Carboxypeptidase E =

Enzyme found in humans

CPE

Identifiers
- Aliases: CPE, CPH, carboxypeptidase E, IDDHH, BDVS
- External IDs: OMIM: 114855; MGI: 101932; GeneCards: CPE
Enzyme activity
EC #	BRENDA	ExPASy	KEGG	MetaCyc
3.4.17.10	↗	↗	↗	↗

Gene location (Human)
Chr.	Chromosome 4 (human)
Band	4q32.3	Start	165,361,194 bp
Band	4q32.3	End	165,498,547 bp

Gene location (Mouse)
Chr.	Chromosome 8 (mouse)
Band	8 B3.1|8 32.3 cM	Start	65,045,576 bp
Band	8 B3.1|8 32.3 cM	End	65,146,088 bp
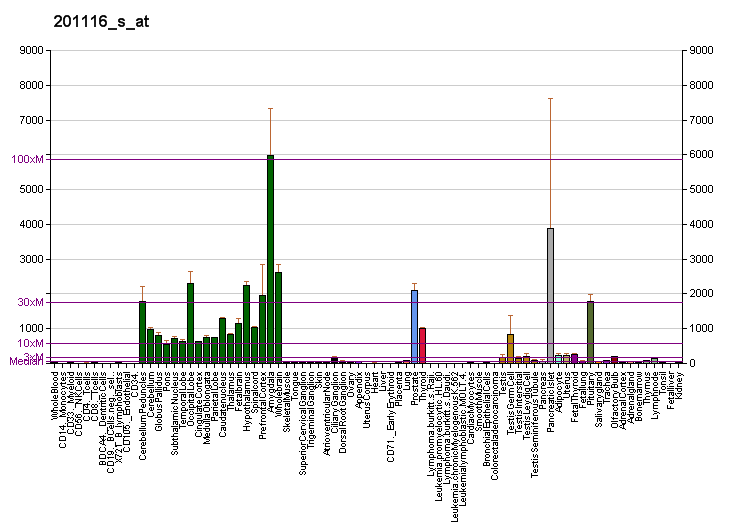

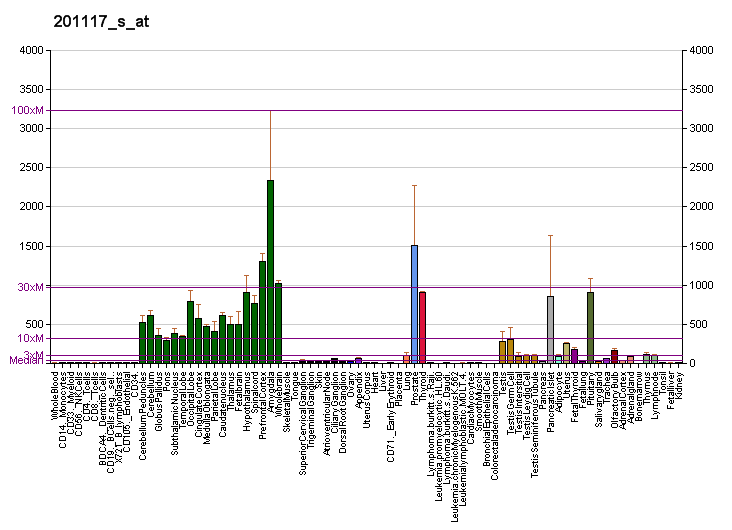
RNA expression pattern
Bgee	Human / Mouse (ortholog); Top expressed in: beta cell; caudate nucleus; paraflocculus of cerebellum; nucleus accumbens; amygdala; putamen; external globus pallidus; prefrontal cortex; dorsolateral prefrontal cortex; cerebellar vermis / Top expressed in: anterior amygdaloid area; cingulate gyrus; lateral septal nucleus; ventral tegmental area; nucleus of stria terminalis; subiculum; nucleus accumbens; habenula; paraventricular nucleus of hypothalamus; medial geniculate nucleus; More reference expression data
BioGPS	More reference expression data
Gene ontology
Molecular function	zinc ion binding; metal ion binding; neurexin family protein binding; peptidase activity; carboxypeptidase activity; hydrolase activity; metallopeptidase activity; cell adhesion molecule binding; metallocarboxypeptidase activity; serine-type carboxypeptidase activity
Cellular component	synaptic membrane; Golgi apparatus; secretory granule membrane; membrane; plasma membrane; transport vesicle membrane; secretory granule; extracellular region; soma; extracellular exosome; cytoplasmic vesicle; nucleus; extracellular space; transport vesicle
Biological process	protein localization to membrane; insulin processing; cardiac left ventricle morphogenesis; Wnt signaling pathway; proteolysis; metabolism; neuropeptide signaling pathway; peptide metabolic process; protein processing; peptide hormone secretion; protein localization to secretory granule
Sources:Amigo / QuickGO
Orthologs
Databases	NCBI: entry; OMA: entry
Species	Human	Mouse
Entrez	1363	12876
Ensembl	ENSG00000109472	ENSMUSG00000037852
UniProt	P16870	Q00493
RefSeq (mRNA)	NM_001873	NM_013494
RefSeq (protein)	NP_001864	NP_038522
Location (UCSC)	Chr 4: 165.36 – 165.5 Mb	Chr 8: 65.05 – 65.15 Mb
PubMed search
- Wikidata
View/Edit Human	View/Edit Mouse

Carboxypeptidase E (CPE), also known as carboxypeptidase H (CPH) and enkephalin convertase, is an enzyme that in humans is encoded by the CPE gene. This enzyme catalyzes the release of C-terminal arginine or lysine residues from polypeptides.

CPE is involved in the biosynthesis of most neuropeptides and peptide hormones. The production of neuropeptides and peptide hormones typically requires two sets of enzymes that cleave the peptide precursors, which are small proteins. First, proprotein convertases cut the precursor at specific sites to generate intermediates containing C-terminal basic residues (lysine and/or arginine). These intermediates are then cleaved by CPE to remove the basic residues. For some peptides, additional processing steps, such as C-terminal amidation, are subsequently required to generate the bioactive peptide, although for many peptides the action of the proprotein convertases and CPE is sufficient to produce the bioactive peptide.

== Tissue distribution ==
Carboxypeptidase E is found in brain and throughout the neuroendocrine system, including the endocrine pancreas, pituitary, and adrenal gland chromaffin cells. Within cells, carboxypeptidase E is present in the secretory granules along with its peptide substrates and products. Carboxypeptidase E is a glycoprotein that exists in both membrane-associated and soluble forms. The membrane-binding is due to an amphiphilic α-helix within the C-terminal region of the protein.

== Species distribution ==
Carboxypeptidase E is found in all species of vertebrates that have been examined, and is also present in many other organisms that have been studied (nematode, sea slug). Carboxypeptidase E is not found in the fruit fly (Drosophila), and another enzyme (presumably carboxypeptidase D) fills in for carboxypeptidase E in this organism. In humans, CPE is encoded by the CPE gene.

== Function ==
Carboxypeptidase E

Identifiers
- EC no.: 3.4.17.10
- CAS no.: 81876-95-1

Databases
- BRENDA: enzyme data
- ExPASy: NiceZyme view
- KEGG: enzyme entry
- MetaCyc: metabolic pathway
- Rhea: reactions
- PDB structures: RCSB PDB PDBe PDBsum
- Gene Ontology: AmiGO / QuickGO
Search
- PMC: articles
- PubMed: articles
- NCBI: proteins

Carboxypeptidase E functions in the production of nearly all neuropeptides and peptide hormones. The enzyme acts as an exopeptidase to activate neuropeptides. It does that by cleaving off basic C-terminal amino acids, producing the active form of the peptide. Products of carboxypeptidase E include insulin, the enkephalins, vasopressin, oxytocin, and most other neuroendocrine peptide hormones and neuropeptides.

It has been proposed that membrane-associated carboxypeptidase E acts as a sorting signal for regulated secretory proteins in the trans-Golgi network of the pituitary and in secretory granules; regulated secretory proteins are mostly hormones and neuropeptides. However, this role for carboxypeptidase E remains controversial, and evidence shows that this enzyme is not necessary for the sorting of regulated secretory proteins.

== Clinical significance ==
Mice with mutant carboxypeptidase E, Cpe^{fat}, display endocrine disorders like obesity and infertility. In some strains of mice, the fat mutation also causes hyperproinsulinemia in adult male mice, but this is not found in all strains of mice. The obesity and infertility in the Cpe^{fat} mice develop with age; young mice (<8 weeks of age) are fertile and have normal body weight. Peptide processing in Cpe^{fat} mice is impaired, with a large accumulation of peptides with C-terminal lysine and/or arginine extensions. Levels of the mature forms of peptides are generally reduced in these mice, but not eliminated. It is thought that a related enzyme (carboxypeptidase D) also contributes to neuropeptide processing and gives rise to the mature peptides in the Cpe^{fat} mice.

Mutations in the CPE gene are not common within the human population, but have been identified. One patient with extreme obesity (Body Mass Index >50) was found to have a mutation that deleted nearly the entire CPE gene. This patient had intellectual disability (inability to read or write) and had abnormal glucose homeostasis, similar to mice lacking CPE activity.

In obesity, high levels of circulating free fatty acids have been reported to cause a decrease in the amount of carboxypeptidase E protein in pancreatic beta-cells, leading to beta-cell dysfunction (hyperproinsulinemia) and increased beta-cell apoptosis (via an increase in ER stress). However, because CPE is not a rate-limiting enzyme for the production of most neuropeptides and peptide hormones, it is not clear how relatively modest decreases in CPE activity can cause physiological effects.

== See also ==
- Carboxypeptidase
- Carboxypeptidase A
