= Tubulinyl-Tyr carboxypeptidase =

Identifiers
- EC no.: 3.4.17.17
- CAS no.: 73050-23-4

Databases
- IntEnz: IntEnz view
- BRENDA: BRENDA entry
- ExPASy: NiceZyme view
- KEGG: KEGG entry
- MetaCyc: metabolic pathway
- PRIAM: profile
- PDB structures: RCSB PDB PDBe PDBsum
Search
- PMC: articles
- PubMed: articles
- NCBI: proteins

Tubulinyl-Tyr carboxypeptidase (EC 3.4.17.17, carboxypeptidase-tubulin, soluble carboxypeptidase, tubulin-tyrosine carboxypeptidase, tubulin carboxypeptidase, tubulinyltyrosine carboxypeptidase, tyrosinotubulin carboxypeptidase, tyrosyltubulin carboxypeptidase, TTCPase, brain I carboxypeptidase) is an enzyme. This enzyme catalyses the following chemical reaction

Cleavage of the -Glu--Tyr bond to release the C-terminal tyrosine residue from the native tyrosinated tubulin. Inactive on Z-Glu-Tyr

This enzyme is active at neutral pH.

This activity has been linked to proteins such as AGTPBP1 in human.
