= Saccharolysin =

Identifiers
- EC no.: 3.4.24.37
- CAS no.: 96779-48-5

Databases
- IntEnz: IntEnz view
- BRENDA: BRENDA entry
- ExPASy: NiceZyme view
- KEGG: KEGG entry
- MetaCyc: metabolic pathway
- PRIAM: profile
- PDB structures: RCSB PDB PDBe PDBsum
Search
- PMC: articles
- PubMed: articles
- NCBI: proteins

Saccharolysin (EC 3.4.24.37, proteinase yscD, yeast cysteine proteinase D, Saccharomyces cerevisiae proteinase yscD) is an enzyme. This enzyme catalyses the following chemical reaction

Cleavage of Pro-Phe and Ala-Ala bonds

This cytoplasmic metalloendopeptidase is present in Saccharomyces cerevisiae.
