= ADAMDEC1 =

Protein

Identifiers
- Aliases: ADAMDEC1, M12.219, ADAM like decysin 1
- External IDs: OMIM: 606393; MGI: 1917650; GeneCards: ADAMDEC1

Gene location (Human)
Chr.	Chromosome 8 (human)
Band	8p21.2	Start	24,384,285 bp
Band	8p21.2	End	24,406,013 bp

Gene location (Mouse)
Chr.	Chromosome 14 (mouse)
Band	14|14 D1	Start	68,800,829 bp
Band	14|14 D1	End	68,819,544 bp
RNA expression pattern
Bgee	Human / Mouse (ortholog); Top expressed in: jejunal mucosa; mucosa of sigmoid colon; rectum; mucosa of ileum; mucosa of transverse colon; duodenum; cecum; appendix; epithelium of colon; lymph node / Top expressed in: migratory enteric neural crest cell; Paneth cell; ileum; left colon; jejunum; left lung lobe; olfactory epithelium; stomach; transitional epithelium of urinary bladder; pyloric antrum; More reference expression data
BioGPS	n/a
Gene ontology
Molecular function	peptidase activity; metalloendopeptidase activity; hydrolase activity; metallopeptidase activity; metal ion binding; zinc ion binding
Cellular component	extracellular region; cellular component; collagen-containing extracellular matrix
Biological process	negative regulation of cell adhesion; immune response; proteolysis
Sources:Amigo / QuickGO
Orthologs
Databases	NCBI: entry; OMA: entry
Species	Human	Mouse
Entrez	27299	58860
Ensembl	ENSG00000134028	ENSMUSG00000022057
UniProt	O15204	Q9R0X2
RefSeq (mRNA)	NM_001145271; NM_001145272; NM_014479	NM_021475
RefSeq (protein)	NP_001138743; NP_001138744; NP_055294	NP_067450
Location (UCSC)	Chr 8: 24.38 – 24.41 Mb	Chr 14: 68.8 – 68.82 Mb
PubMed search
- Wikidata
View/Edit Human	View/Edit Mouse

ADAM-like, decysin 1 is a protein that in humans is encoded by the ADAMDEC1 gene.

== Function ==
This encoded protein is thought to be a secreted protein belonging to the disintegrin metalloproteinase family. Its expression is upregulated during the maturation of dendritic cells. This protein may play an important role in dendritic cell function and their interactions with germinal center T cells. [provided by RefSeq, Jul 2008].
