= CPZ =

CPZ may refer to:

- Carboxypeptidase Z, an enzyme encoded by the gene CPZ
- CPZ: an EEG electrode site according to the 10-20 system
- Circuit Park Zandvoort, a motorsport track near Zandvoort, the Netherlands
- Continuous permafrost zone, an area where permafrost cannot thaw
- Controlled parking zone, a type of UK parking restriction
- Chlorpromazine, an antipsychotic drug
- Compass Airlines (North America) (ICAO designator), a U.S. airline
- Corner Patrol Zone, a type of hazard in the Robot Wars Arena

Zoos

- Capron Park Zoo, Attleboro, Massachusetts
- Central Park Zoo, Manhattan, New York City
- Charles Paddock Zoo, San Luis Obispo County, California
