= Gp180 =

Term Gp180 may refer to:

- PTPRC, an enzyme that is in humans encoded by the PTPRC gene
- Metallocarboxypeptidase D, an enzyme class
