= Meprin B =

Identifiers
- EC no.: 3.4.24.63
- CAS no.: 150679-52-0

Databases
- IntEnz: IntEnz view
- BRENDA: BRENDA entry
- ExPASy: NiceZyme view
- KEGG: KEGG entry
- MetaCyc: metabolic pathway
- PRIAM: profile
- PDB structures: RCSB PDB PDBe PDBsum
Search
- PMC: articles
- PubMed: articles
- NCBI: proteins

Meprin B (EC 3.4.24.63, meprin-b) is an enzyme. This enzyme catalyses the following chemical reaction

Hydrolysis of proteins, including azocasein, and peptides. Hydrolysis of -His^{5}-Leu-, -Leu^{6}-Cys-, -Ala^{14}-Leu- and -Cys^{19}-Gly- bonds in insulin B chain

Even though it is primarily found and embedded into the cell membrane it can also be found in the extracellular space. Like other meprins it can hydrolyze different molecules.

This membrane-bound metalloendopeptidase is present in mouse intestines.
