= Carboxypeptidase A4 =

Enzyme found in humans

CPA4
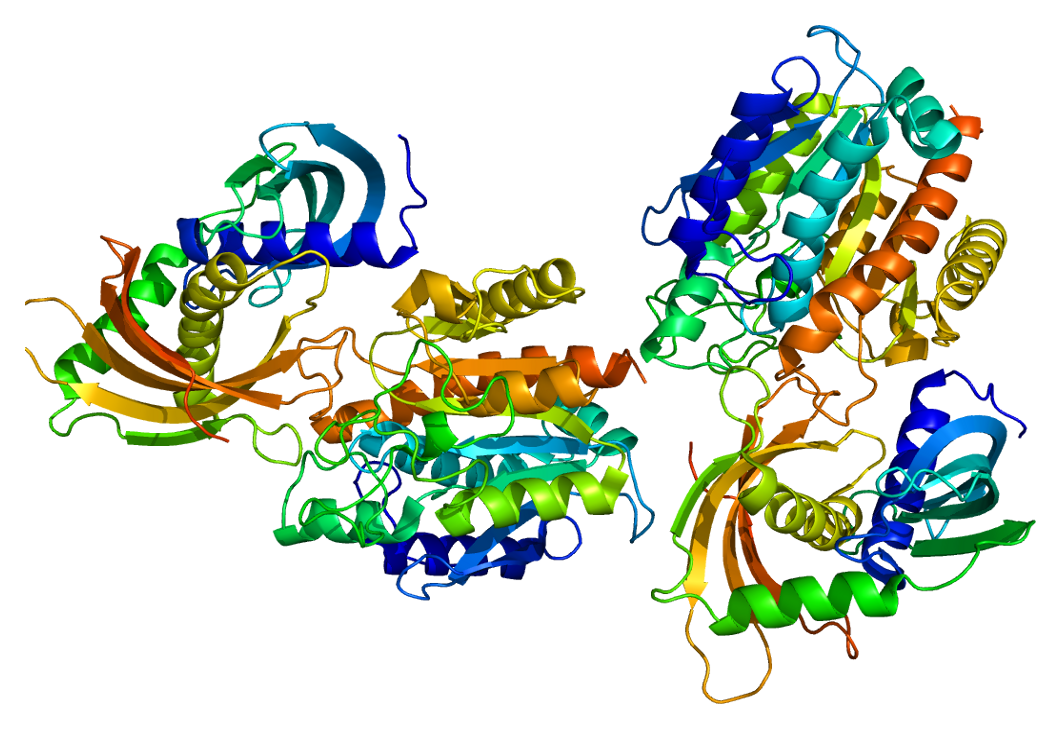

Identifiers
- Aliases: CPA4, CPA3, carboxypeptidase A4
- External IDs: OMIM: 607635; MGI: 1919041; GeneCards: CPA4
Available structures
PDB	Ortholog search: PDBe RCSB
PDB	List of PDB id codes 2BO9, 2BOA, 2PCU, 4A94, 4BD9

Gene location (Mouse)
Chr.	Chromosome 6 (mouse)
Band	6|6 A3.3	Start	30,568,368 bp
Band	6|6 A3.3	End	30,592,417 bp
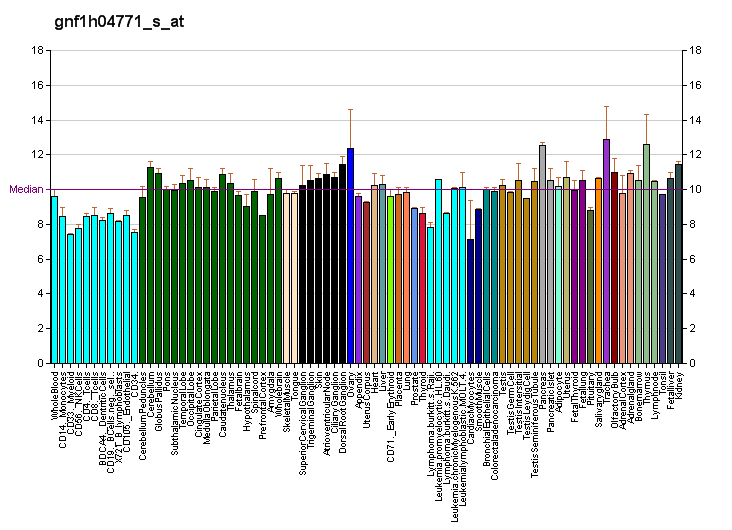

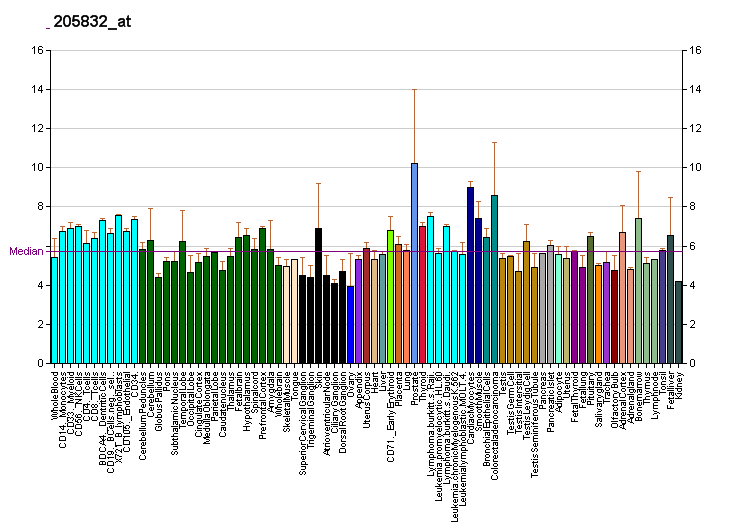
RNA expression pattern
Bgee	Human / Mouse (ortholog); Top expressed in: skin of abdomen; body of pancreas; islet of Langerhans; right adrenal gland; left adrenal gland; vagina; placenta; spleen; minor salivary glands; spinal cord / Top expressed in: lip; esophagus; skin of external ear; skin of back; embryo; skin of abdomen; ventricular zone; umbilical cord; morula; epidermis; More reference expression data
BioGPS	More reference expression data
Gene ontology
Molecular function	carboxypeptidase activity; peptidase activity; zinc ion binding; hydrolase activity; metallopeptidase activity; metal ion binding; metallocarboxypeptidase activity; protein binding
Cellular component	extracellular region; extracellular space; cellular component
Biological process	histone acetylation; proteolysis
Sources:Amigo / QuickGO
Orthologs
Databases	NCBI: entry
Species	Human	Mouse
Entrez	51200	71791
Ensembl	n/a	ENSMUSG00000039070
UniProt	Q9UI42	Q6P8K8
RefSeq (mRNA)	NM_016352; NM_001163446	NM_027926
RefSeq (protein)	NP_001156918; NP_057436	NP_082202
Location (UCSC)	n/a	Chr 6: 30.57 – 30.59 Mb
PubMed search
- Wikidata
View/Edit Human	View/Edit Mouse

Carboxypeptidase A4 is an enzyme that in humans is encoded by the CPA4 gene.

This gene is a member of the carboxypeptidase A/B subfamily, and it is located in a cluster with three other family members on chromosome 7. Carboxypeptidases are zinc-containing exopeptidases that catalyze the release of carboxy-terminal amino acids, and are synthesized as zymogens that are activated by proteolytic cleavage. This gene could be involved in the histone hyperacetylation pathway. It is imprinted and may be a strong candidate gene for prostate cancer aggressiveness.
