= Carboxypeptidase A inhibitor =

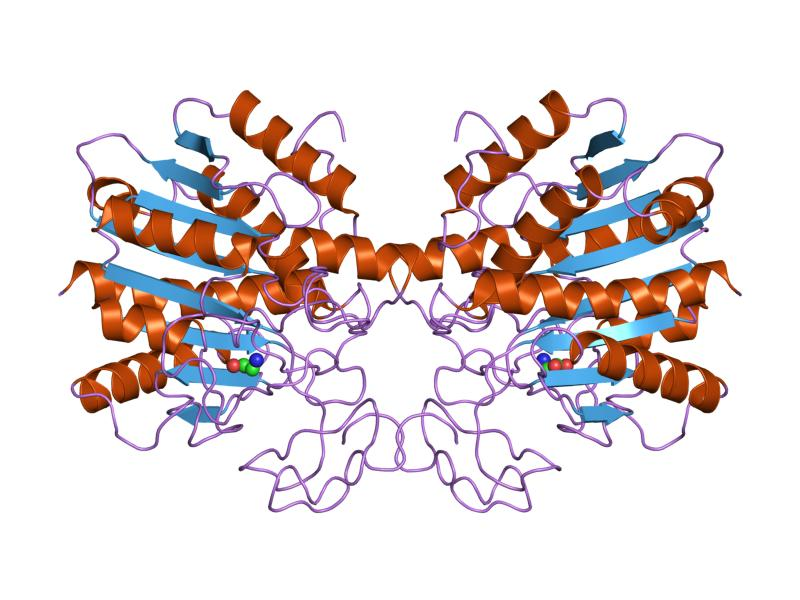
- refined crystal structure of the potato inhibitor complex of carboxypeptidase a at 2.5 angstroms resolution

Identifiers
- Symbol: ?
- Pfam: PF02977
- Pfam clan: CL0096
- InterPro: IPR004231
- SCOP2: 4cpa / SCOPe / SUPFAM
Available protein structures:
- PDB: IPR004231 PF02977 (ECOD; PDBsum)
- AlphaFold: IPR004231; PF02977

In molecular biology, the carboxypeptidase A inhibitor family is a family of proteins which is represented by the well-characterised metallocarboxypeptidase A inhibitor (MCPI) from potatoes, which belongs to the MEROPS inhibitor family I37, clan IE. It inhibits metallopeptidases belonging to MEROPS peptidase family M14, carboxypeptidase A. In Russet Burbank potatoes, it is a mixture of approximately equal amounts of two polypeptide chains containing 38 or 39 amino acid residues. The chains differ in their amino terminal sequence only and are resistant to fragmentation by proteases. The structure of the complex between bovine carboxypeptidase A and the 39-amino-acid carboxypeptidase A inhibitor from potatoes has been determined at 2.5-Angstrom resolution.

The potato inhibitor is synthesised as a precursor, having a 29 amino acid N-terminal signal peptide, a 27 amino acid pro-peptide, the 39 amino acid mature inhibitor region and a 7 amino acid C-terminal extension. The 7 amino acid C-terminal extension is involved in inhibitor inactivation and may be required for targeting to the vacuole where the mature active inhibitor accumulates.

The N-terminal region and the mature inhibitor are weakly related to other solananaceous proteins found in this family, from potato, tomato and henbane, which have been incorrectly described as metallocarboxypeptidase inhibitors.
