= Carboxypeptidase Z =

Enzyme found in humans

CPZ

Identifiers
- Aliases: CPZ, carboxypeptidase Z
- External IDs: OMIM: 603105; MGI: 88487; GeneCards: CPZ

Gene location (Human)
Chr.	Chromosome 4 (human)
Band	4p16.1	Start	8,592,660 bp
Band	4p16.1	End	8,619,759 bp

Gene location (Mouse)
Chr.	Chromosome 5 (mouse)
Band	5|5 B3	Start	35,659,562 bp
Band	5|5 B3	End	35,683,042 bp
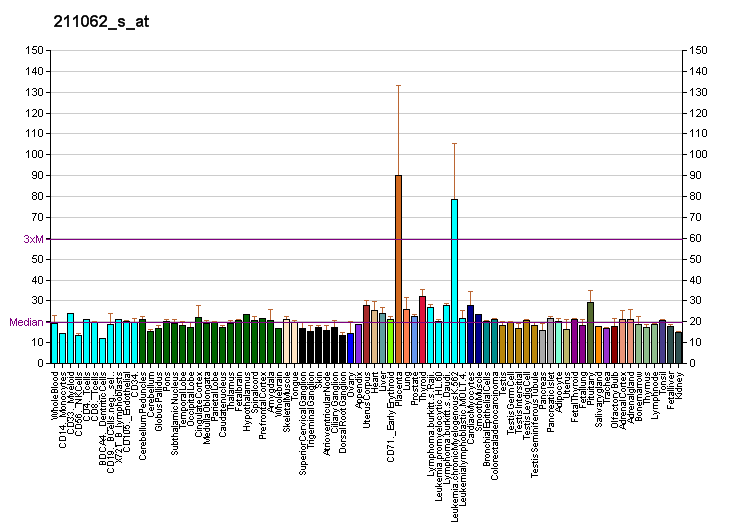
RNA expression pattern
Bgee	Human / Mouse (ortholog); Top expressed in: left ovary; right ovary; placenta; gallbladder; canal of the cervix; ectocervix; stromal cell of endometrium; vagina; fallopian tube; right uterine tube / Top expressed in: body of femur; calvaria; molar; skin of back; lens; urethra; vestibular sensory epithelium; cornea; skin of abdomen; embryo; More reference expression data
BioGPS	More reference expression data
Gene ontology
Molecular function	carboxypeptidase activity; zinc ion binding; peptidase activity; hydrolase activity; metallopeptidase activity; metal ion binding; metallocarboxypeptidase activity; serine-type carboxypeptidase activity
Cellular component	extracellular region; extracellular space
Biological process	protein processing; Wnt signaling pathway; proteolysis; peptide metabolic process
Sources:Amigo / QuickGO
Orthologs
Databases	NCBI: entry; OMA: entry
Species	Human	Mouse
Entrez	8532	242939
Ensembl	ENSG00000109625	ENSMUSG00000036596
UniProt	Q66K79	Q8R4V4
RefSeq (mRNA)	NM_003652; NM_001014447; NM_001014448	NM_153107
RefSeq (protein)	NP_001014447; NP_001014448; NP_003643	NP_694747
Location (UCSC)	Chr 4: 8.59 – 8.62 Mb	Chr 5: 35.66 – 35.68 Mb
PubMed search
- Wikidata
View/Edit Human	View/Edit Mouse

Carboxypeptidase Z is an enzyme that in humans is encoded by the CPZ gene.

This gene encodes a member of the metallocarboxypeptidase family. This enzyme displays carboxypeptidase activity towards substrates with basic C-terminal residues. It is most active at neutral pH and is inhibited by active site-directed inhibitors of metallocarboxypeptidases. Alternative splicing in the coding region results in multiple transcript variants encoding different isoforms.
