= AE binding protein 1 =

Protein-coding gene in the species Homo sapiens

AEBP1

Identifiers
- Aliases: AEBP1, ACLP, AE binding protein 1
- External IDs: OMIM: 602981; MGI: 1197012; GeneCards: AEBP1

Gene location (Human)
Chr.	Chromosome 7 (human)
Band	7p13	Start	44,104,345 bp
Band	7p13	End	44,114,562 bp

Gene location (Mouse)
Chr.	Chromosome 11 (mouse)
Band	11|11 A1	Start	5,811,947 bp
Band	11|11 A1	End	5,822,088 bp
RNA expression pattern
Bgee	Human / Mouse (ortholog); Top expressed in: tendon of biceps brachii; thoracic aorta; ascending aorta; right coronary artery; Descending thoracic aorta; popliteal artery; tibial arteries; left coronary artery; saphenous vein; canal of the cervix / Top expressed in: ascending aorta; aortic valve; calvaria; tunica media of zone of aorta; uterus; cervix; body of femur; adrenal gland; stroma of bone marrow; tunica adventitia of aorta; More reference expression data
BioGPS	n/a
Gene ontology
Molecular function	DNA binding; RNA polymerase II transcription regulatory region sequence-specific DNA binding; transcription corepressor activity; DNA-binding transcription factor activity; zinc ion binding; calmodulin binding; DNA-binding transcription repressor activity, RNA polymerase II-specific; metallocarboxypeptidase activity; carboxypeptidase activity; serine-type carboxypeptidase activity; extracellular matrix structural constituent; collagen binding
Cellular component	cytoplasm; extracellular matrix; extracellular exosome; nucleus; extracellular space; extracellular region; collagen-containing extracellular matrix
Biological process	skeletal system development; regulation of transcription, DNA-templated; peptide metabolic process; protein processing; muscle organ development; negative regulation of transcription by RNA polymerase II; transcription, DNA-templated; proteolysis; regulation of collagen fibril organization
Sources:Amigo / QuickGO
Orthologs
Databases	NCBI: entry; OMA: entry
Species	Human	Mouse
Entrez	165	11568
Ensembl	ENSG00000106624	ENSMUSG00000020473
UniProt	Q8IUX7	Q640N1
RefSeq (mRNA)	NM_001129	NM_001291857; NM_009636
RefSeq (protein)	NP_001120	NP_001278786; NP_033766
Location (UCSC)	Chr 7: 44.1 – 44.11 Mb	Chr 11: 5.81 – 5.82 Mb
PubMed search
- Wikidata
View/Edit Human	View/Edit Mouse

AE binding protein 1 is a protein that in humans is encoded by the AEBP1 gene.

== Function ==
AE binding protein 1 is a member of carboxypeptidase A protein family. The protein may function as a transcriptional repressor and play a role in adipogenesis and smooth muscle cell differentiation. Studies in mice suggest that the AEBP1 gene that encodes the protein functions in wound healing and abdominal wall development. Overexpression of this gene is associated with glioblastoma.
