= AGTPBP1 =

Human protein-coding gene

Identifiers
- Aliases: AGTPBP1, CCP1, NNA1, ATP/GTP binding protein 1, CONDCA, ATP/GTP binding carboxypeptidase 1
- External IDs: OMIM: 606830; MGI: 2159437; GeneCards: AGTPBP1
Enzyme activity
EC #	BRENDA	ExPASy	KEGG	MetaCyc
3.4.17.24	↗	↗	↗	↗

Gene location (Human)
Chr.	Chromosome 9 (human)
Band	9q21.33	Start	85,546,539 bp
Band	9q21.33	End	85,742,029 bp

Gene location (Mouse)
Chr.	Chromosome 13 (mouse)
Band	13 B2|13	Start	59,593,556 bp
Band	13 B2|13	End	59,733,041 bp
RNA expression pattern
Bgee	Human / Mouse (ortholog); Top expressed in: corpus callosum; monocyte; bone marrow; bone marrow cell; inferior olivary nucleus; trabecular bone; right ventricle; blood; pars compacta; optic nerve / Top expressed in: spermatid; dentate gyrus of hippocampal formation granule cell; spermatocyte; cerebellar cortex; superior frontal gyrus; facial motor nucleus; lobe of cerebellum; cerebellar vermis; neural layer of retina; primary visual cortex; More reference expression data
BioGPS	n/a
Gene ontology
Molecular function	carboxypeptidase activity; tubulin binding; zinc ion binding; peptidase activity; metallopeptidase activity; hydrolase activity; metal ion binding; metallocarboxypeptidase activity
Cellular component	cytoplasm; cytosol; mitochondrion; nucleus; nucleolus; intracellular membrane-bounded organelle
Biological process	mitochondrion organization; olfactory bulb development; C-terminal protein deglutamylation; neuromuscular process; eye photoreceptor cell differentiation; protein side chain deglutamylation; proteolysis; cerebellar Purkinje cell differentiation
Sources:Amigo / QuickGO
Orthologs
Databases	NCBI: entry; OMA: entry
Species	Human	Mouse
Entrez	23287	67269
Ensembl	ENSG00000135049	ENSMUSG00000021557
UniProt	Q9UPW5	Q641K1
RefSeq (mRNA)	NM_001286715; NM_001286717; NM_015239; NM_001330701	NM_001048008; NM_001284218; NM_001284219; NM_001284221; NM_023328 NM_001377097
RefSeq (protein)	NP_001273644; NP_001273646; NP_001317630; NP_056054; NP_056054.2	NP_001041473; NP_001271147; NP_001271148; NP_001271150; NP_075817 NP_001364026
Location (UCSC)	Chr 9: 85.55 – 85.74 Mb	Chr 13: 59.59 – 59.73 Mb
PubMed search
- Wikidata
View/Edit Human	View/Edit Mouse

ATP/GTP binding protein 1 also known as cytosolic carboxypeptidase 1 (CCP1) is protein that in humans is encoded by the AGTPBP1 gene.

== Gene ==
The AGTPBP1 gene in humans is located on chromosome 9.

Several spontaneous mutations in the mouse Agtpbp1 gene have been identified that cause the autosomal recessive Purkinje cell degeneration (pcd) phenotype. The mouse Agtpbp1 gene is located on mouse chromosome 13. The gene, originally designated Nna1, was first identified through its expression in regenerating alpha motor neurons following axonal injury.

== Structure ==
CCP1/NNA1 is a zinc carboxypeptidase that contains nuclear localization signals. Although originally thought to contain an ATP/GTP-binding motif, this was not experimentally verified, and the potential domain is not conserved through evolution.

== Function ==
=== Tubulin deglutamylation ===
Based on sequence similarities, CCP1 was proposed to be involved in tubulin processing along with five other carboxypeptidases, designated CCP2 to CCP6.

=== Microtubule regulation and neuronal survival ===
The abnormal development in Purkinje cell dendrites of Agtpbp1-pcd mice was linked to a decrease in microtubule-associated proteins 1B and 2. Microtubule structure and dynamics can be seen to be impaired in embryonic fibroblasts of Agtpbp1-pcd mice. In particular, Purkinje cell loss in Agtpbp1-pcd mice was linked with microtubule hyperglutamylation.

== Animal models ==
=== Purkinje cell degeneration mice ===
In Agtpbp1-pcd mutant mice, the predominant pathology comprises near total Purkinje cell loss from the third to the fourth postnatal week along with a more slowly progressing loss in retinal photoreceptors. The slower and less complete degeneration of inferior olive neurons is most probably a consequence of retrograde degeneration secondary to Purkinje cell loss. and the degeneration of deep cerebellar nuclei a consequence of anterograde degeneration secondary to Purkinje cell loss.

The pcd^{5J} mutation in Agtpbp1 consists of a single amino acid insertion that destabilizes the NNA1 protein.

=== Neurochemical changes ===
In view of Purkinje cell loss, gamma-aminobutyric acid (GABA) concentrations decreased in the cerebellum of Agtpbp1-pcd mutants. In particular, GABA concentrations decreased in the deep cerebellar nuclei, target of Purkinje axons, but not in cerebellar cortex despite Purkinje cell loss, presumably because the maintenance of inhibitory interneurons compensated for it in a shrunken cerebellum. In line with the Purkinje cell loss, the number of GABAergic terminal boutons declined in deep cerebellar nuclei of Agtpbp1-pcd mutants. while the density of GABAergic soma in the deep cerebellar nuclei was normal. Presumably because of post-synaptic supersensitivity following Purkinje cell loss, binding of the GABA-A receptor and its associated benzodiazepine receptor (BZD) receptor increased in deep cerebellar nuclei of Agtpbp1-pcd mutants. In particular, there was an increase in large aggregates of the GABA-A-alpha receptor subtype in deep cerebellar nuclei.

Presumably because of slowly progressing granule cell deterioration., glutamate concentrations per protein weight decreased in the cerebellar cortex of 6, 9, and 12 month-old Agtpbp1-pcd mutants (McBride and Ghetti, 1978). On the contrary, their glutamate concentrations per tissue weight were equivalent to controls in cerebellar cortex and deep nuclei at younger ages of 1 to 3 months (Roffler-Tarlov et al., 1979), presumably because of slowly progressing granule cell deterioration. Non-NMDA receptor binding decreased in molecular and granule cell layers of the cerebellar cortex but not the deep nuclei of Agtpbp1-pcd mutants (Stasi et al., 1997). More particularly, the decline in binding occurred for the alpha-amino-3-hydroxy-5-methyl-4-isoxazolepropionic acid (AMPA receptor) receptor at the level of molecular and granule cell layers. The residual presence of AMPA receptors in the molecular layer despite Purkinje cell loss was attributed to the continued maintenance of stellate and basket cells.

Monoamine systems have been examined in view of cerebellar targets by 5-hydroxy-tryptamine (5HT) fibers originating from medial and dorsal raphe nuclei, noradrenaline fibers from the locus coeruleus, and dopamine fibers from the ventral tegmental area. 5HT concentrations increased in the cerebellum of Agtpbp1-pcd mutant mice, as did 5HT fiber density. and 5HT uptake binding. The results are more variable when 5HT content per cerebellum is considered, increases being found only in older (9 and 15 months of age) not younger (3 and 6 months of age) mice.

In a similar manner to the 5HT system, noradrenaline concentrations increased in Agtpbp1-pcd mutants. Noradrenaline uptake per protein weight increased in cerebellar cortex and deep nuclei of Agtpbp1-pcd mutants, but was unchanged when surface areas was taken into account. Increases per protein weight were also discerned in the granule cell layer and deep nuclei for alpha-1-adrenergic receptor and alpha-2-adrenergic receptor binding as well as beta-adrenergic receptor binding in cerebellar cortex. With total area binding in cerebellar cortex, values were still higher than normal for alpha-2-adrenergic receptors but were lower than normal for the other two.

More limited data are available with the other major brain catecholamine, dopamine. Dopamine transporter binding increased in deep cerebellar nuclei but decreased in the cerebellar molecular layer of Agtpbp1-pcd mutants.

=== Behavioral abnormalities ===
Agtpbp1-pcd mutant mice display overt ataxia (widespread gait) together with irregularly spaced strides on foot-print analyses and motor coordination deficits based on kinematic analyses of multijoint, interlimb, and whole-body movements, more missteps, shorter steps, and longer step times in the Erasmus ladder task, and latencies before falling from the rotarod performance test and other apparatus. The mutants also exhibit anomalies in exploratory activities, including spontaneous alternation. In addition, Agtpbp1-pcd mice had slowed acquisition of spatial learning in the Morris water maze while swimming normally towards a visible platform relative to heterozygotes but not wild-type mice.

== Clinical significance ==
Biallelic mutations in the human AGTPBP1 gene cause infantile-onset neurodegeneration, primarily affecting the cerebellum, spinal motor neurons, and peripheral nerves. Loss of functional CCP1 is associated with abnormal tubulin polyglutamylation, similar to that observed in Agtpbp1-deficient mice.
