= CPN1 =

Protein-coding gene in humans

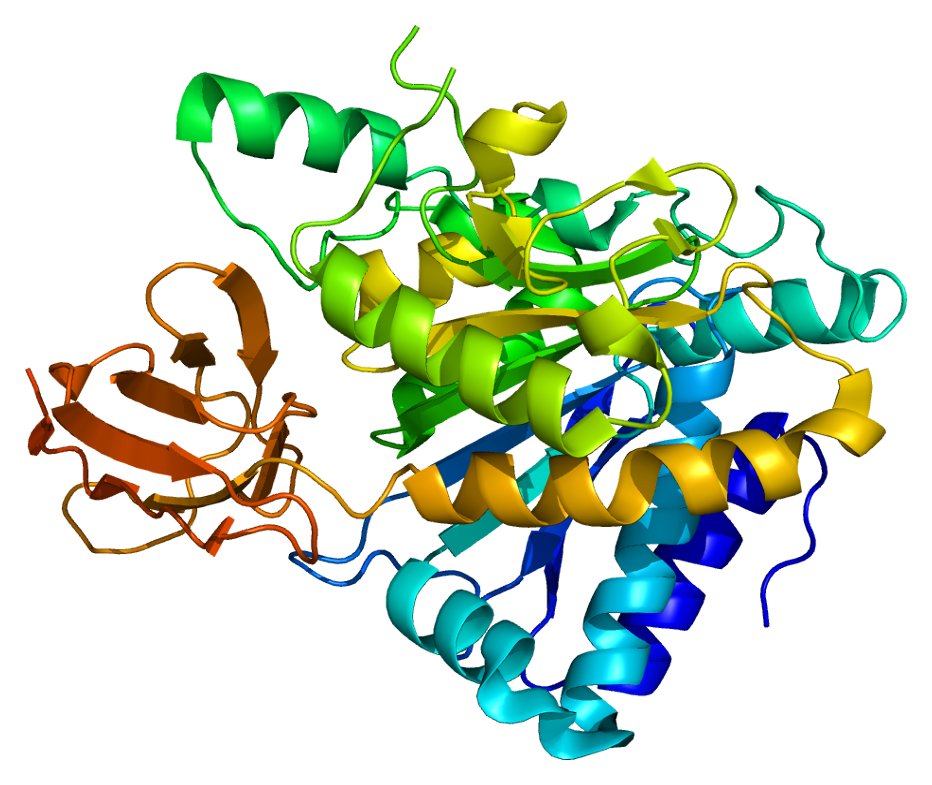

Identifiers
- Aliases: CPN1, CPN, SCPN, carboxypeptidase N subunit 1
- External IDs: OMIM: 603103; MGI: 2135874; GeneCards: CPN1
Available structures
PDB	Ortholog search: PDBe RCSB
PDB	List of PDB id codes 2NSM
Enzyme activity
EC #	BRENDA	ExPASy	KEGG	MetaCyc
3.4.17.3	↗	↗	↗	↗

Gene location (Human)
Chr.	Chromosome 10 (human)
Band	10q24.2	Start	100,042,193 bp
Band	10q24.2	End	100,081,869 bp

Gene location (Mouse)
Chr.	Chromosome 19 (mouse)
Band	19 C3|19 36.68 cM	Start	43,944,746 bp
Band	19 C3|19 36.68 cM	End	43,974,995 bp
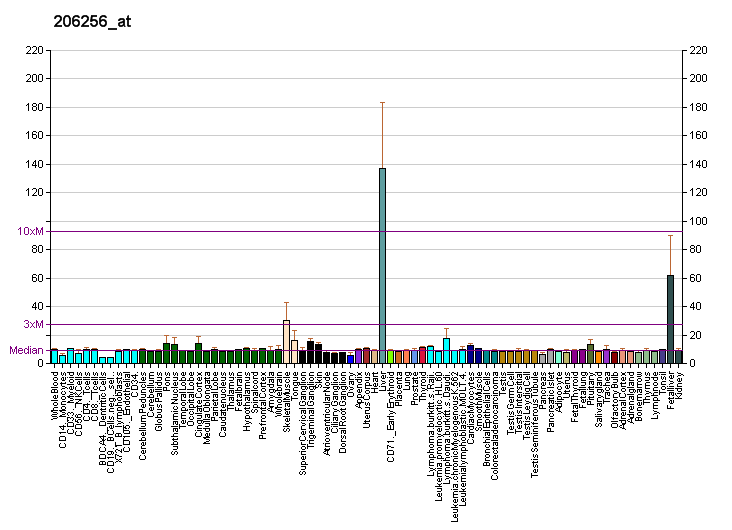
RNA expression pattern
Bgee	Human / Mouse (ortholog); Top expressed in: right lobe of liver; gonad; testicle; buccal mucosa cell; mucosa of ileum; skin of thigh; right testis; left testis; kidney; human kidney / Top expressed in: left lobe of liver; yolk sac; islet of Langerhans; epithelium of stomach; blastocyst; right kidney; pyloric antrum; proximal tubule; morula; morula; More reference expression data
BioGPS	More reference expression data
Gene ontology
Molecular function	carboxypeptidase activity; peptidase activity; zinc ion binding; hydrolase activity; metallopeptidase activity; metal ion binding; metallocarboxypeptidase activity; serine-type carboxypeptidase activity
Cellular component	extracellular space; Golgi apparatus; secretory granule; soma; synaptic membrane; extracellular region
Biological process	response to glucocorticoid; bradykinin catabolic process; proteolysis; insulin processing; regulation of complement activation; peptide metabolic process; protein processing
Sources:Amigo / QuickGO
Orthologs
Databases	NCBI: entry; OMA: entry
Species	Human	Mouse
Entrez	1369	93721
Ensembl	ENSG00000120054	ENSMUSG00000025196
UniProt	P15169	Q9JJN5
RefSeq (mRNA)	NM_001308	NM_030703
RefSeq (protein)	NP_001299	NP_109628
Location (UCSC)	Chr 10: 100.04 – 100.08 Mb	Chr 19: 43.94 – 43.97 Mb
PubMed search
- Wikidata
View/Edit Human	View/Edit Mouse

Carboxypeptidase N catalytic chain is an enzyme that in humans is encoded by the CPN1 gene.

Carboxypeptidase N is a plasma metallo-protease that cleaves basic amino acids from the C terminal of peptides and proteins. The enzyme is important in the regulation of peptides like kinins and anaphylatoxins, and has also been known as kininase-1 and anaphylatoxin inactivator. This enzyme is a tetramer composed of two identical regulatory subunits and two identical catalytic subunits; this gene encodes the catalytic subunit. Mutations in this gene can be associated with angioedema or chronic urticaria resulting from carboxypeptidase N deficiency.

In melanocytic cells CPN1 gene expression may be regulated by MITF.
