= Metallocarboxypeptidase D =

Enzyme found in humans

Identifiers
- EC no.: 3.4.17.22
- CAS no.: 153967-26-1

Databases
- BRENDA: enzyme data
- ExPASy: NiceZyme view
- KEGG: enzyme entry
- MetaCyc: metabolic pathway
- Rhea: reactions
- PDB structures: RCSB PDB PDBe PDBsum
Search
- PMC: articles
- PubMed: articles
- NCBI: proteins

CPD

Identifiers
- Aliases: CPD, GP180, carboxypeptidase D
- External IDs: OMIM: 603102; MGI: 107265; GeneCards: CPD
Enzyme activity
| EC # | BRENDA | ExPASy | KEGG | MetaCyc |
|---|---|---|---|---|
| 3.4.17.22 | ↗ | ↗ | ↗ | ↗ |

Gene location (Human)
| Chr. | Chromosome 17 (human) |
| Band | 17q11.2 | Start | 30,378,927 bp |
| Band | 17q11.2 | End | 30,469,989 bp |

Gene location (Mouse)
| Chr. | Chromosome 11 (mouse) |
| Band | 11 B5|11 46.05 cM | Start | 76,669,250 bp |
| Band | 11 B5|11 46.05 cM | End | 76,737,844 bp |
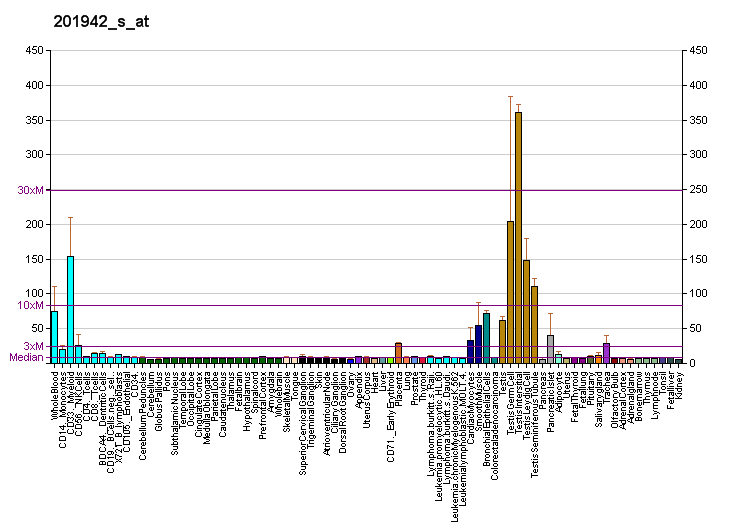

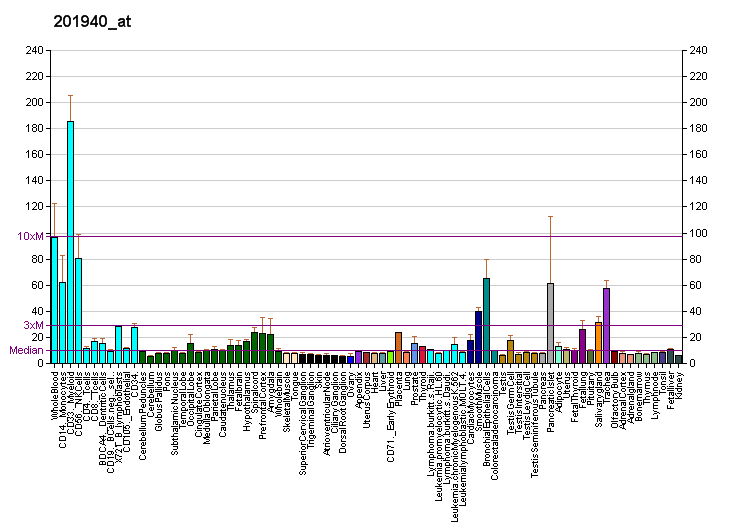

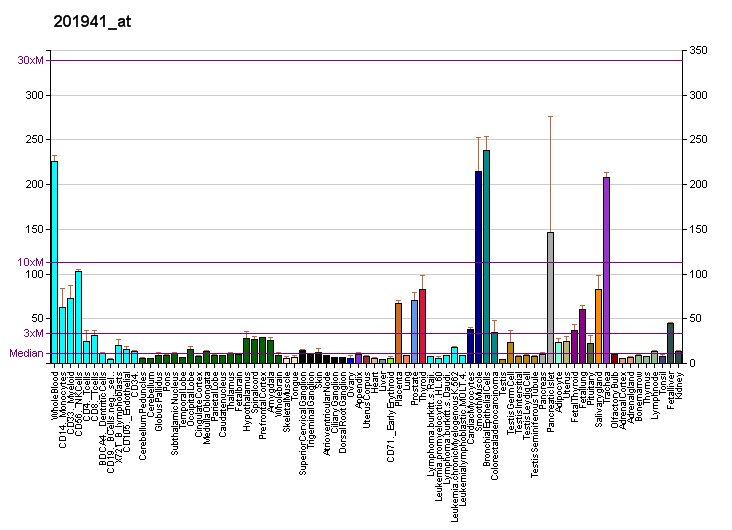
RNA expression pattern
| Bgee | Human / Mouse (ortholog); Top expressed in: parotid gland; islet of Langerhans; bronchial epithelial cell; nasal epithelium; Achilles tendon; pancreatic ductal cell; sperm; epithelium of colon; gallbladder; stromal cell of endometrium / Top expressed in: submandibular gland; parotid gland; lacrimal gland; epithelium of stomach; mucous cell of stomach; left colon; decidua; stria vascularis; corneal stroma; seminal vesicula; More reference expression data |
| BioGPS | More reference expression data |
Gene ontology
| Molecular function | carboxypeptidase activity; zinc ion binding; peptidase activity; hydrolase activity; metallopeptidase activity; metal ion binding; metallocarboxypeptidase activity; serine-type carboxypeptidase activity |
| Cellular component | integral component of membrane; plasma membrane; extracellular exosome; membrane; extracellular space |
| Biological process | protein processing; peptide metabolic process; proteolysis |
Sources:Amigo / QuickGO
Orthologs
| Databases | NCBI: entry; OMA: entry |
| Species | Human | Mouse |
| Entrez | 1362 | 12874 |
| Ensembl | ENSG00000108582 | ENSMUSG00000020841 |
| UniProt | O75976 | O89001 |
| RefSeq (mRNA) | NM_001199775; NM_001304 | NM_007754 |
| RefSeq (protein) | NP_001186704; NP_001295 | NP_031780 |
| Location (UCSC) | Chr 17: 30.38 – 30.47 Mb | Chr 11: 76.67 – 76.74 Mb |
| PubMed search |
- Wikidata
| View/Edit Human | View/Edit Mouse |

Metallocarboxypeptidase D (EC 3.4.17.22), often just called Carboxypeptidase D, is an enzyme that in humans is encoded by the CPD gene. This enzyme catalyses the following chemical reaction

Releases C-terminal Arg and Lys from polypeptides

This enzyme is activated by Co^{2+}, and inhibited by guanidinoethylmercaptosuccinic acid.

== Function ==
The metallocarboxypeptidase family of enzymes is divided into 2 subfamilies based on sequence similarities: the pancreatic carboxypeptidase-like and the regulatory B-type carboxypeptidase subfamilies. Carboxypeptidase D has been identified as a regulatory B-type carboxypeptidase. CPD is a homolog of duck gp180, a hepatitis B virus binding protein. Transcript variants utilizing alternative polyadenylation signals exist for this gene.
