= Rotarod performance test =

Performance test

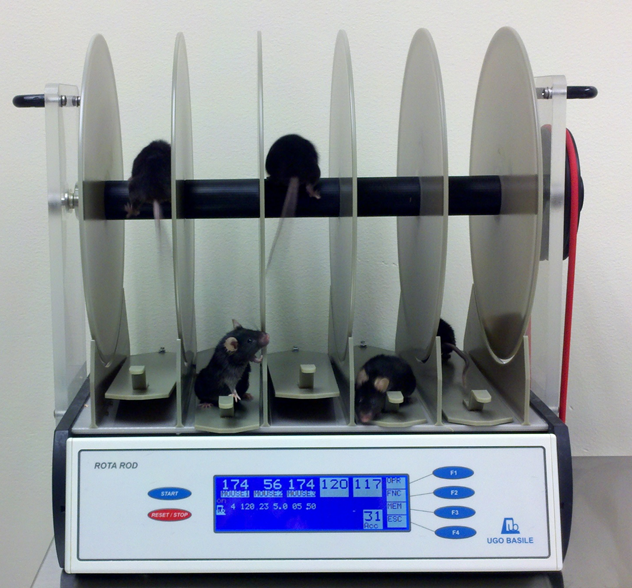
A mouse rotarod apparatus

The rotarod performance test is a performance test based on a rotating rod with forced motor activity being applied, usually by a rodent. The test measures parameters such as riding time (seconds) or endurance. Some of the functions of the test include evaluating balance, grip strength and motor coordination of the subjects; especially in testing the effect of experimental drugs or after traumatic brain injury.

== Rationale ==
In the test, a rodent is placed on a horizontally oriented, rotating cylinder (rod) suspended above a cage floor, which is low enough not to injure the animal, but high enough to induce avoidance of fall. Rodents naturally try to stay on the rotating cylinder, or rotarod, and avoid falling to the ground. The length of time that a given animal stays on this rotating rod is a measure of their balance, coordination, physical condition, and motor-planning. The speed of the rotarod is mechanically driven, and may either be held constant, or accelerated.

A human analog to rotarod test might be treadmill running. Hamster, gerbil, and mouse owners can observe the principle in action when an animal climbs on the outside of its wheel, instead of inside of it. In the rotarod test, however, the rotation of the cylinder in experiments is mechanically driven.

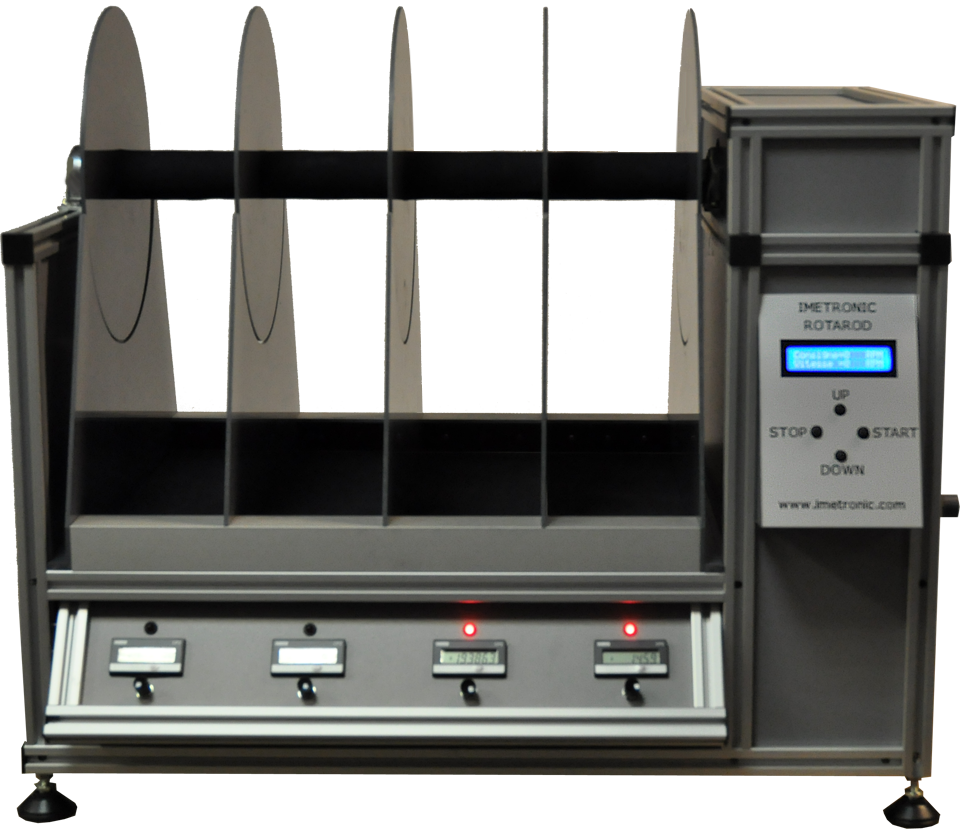
A rat rotarod apparatus

== Scientific use ==
The advantage of this test is that it creates a discretely measurable, continuous variable (length of time) that can be used for statistical purposes to quantify the effects of different drugs, conditions, and procedures. This test does not use subjective judgments of ability, and inter-rater reliability will be virtually perfect. Inter-laboratory reliability will only be achieved if the various parameters (size of cylinder, speed of cylinder, composition material of surface, and amount of practice/training given the animal) are also replicated. The experiment is also very replicable from lab to lab (ibid). Moreover, these parameters may be adjusted variously to optimize the statistical separation of different conditions. For instance, alcohol effects on mice become less apparent when the speed is increased.

Because of concern for impairment in human motor behavior from the use of prescription medications, the rotarod test is frequently used in early stages of drug development to screen out drugs that might later cause subtle impairments, which might not be detected epidemiologically in a human population for a very long time. The test may be useful as a sensitive indicator of trauma induced by brain injury to laboratory rats. Alcohol markedly impairs mouse performance in the rotarod test. Research using the rotarod test with various chemical agonists and antagonists may help scientists determine which components of neurons mediate the effects of chemicals. Testing of genetic knockout animals may help determine the genes most responsible for maintaining mammalian balance and coordination. Comparing the performance of different animals with specific brain lesions helps scientists map which structures are critical for maintaining balance.
