= Carboxypeptidase A5 =

Protein-coding gene in humans

CPA5

Identifiers
- Aliases: CPA5, carboxypeptidase A5
- External IDs: OMIM: 609561; MGI: 1921899; GeneCards: CPA5

Gene location (Human)
Chr.	Chromosome 7 (human)
Band	7q32.2	Start	130,344,816 bp
Band	7q32.2	End	130,368,730 bp

Gene location (Mouse)
Chr.	Chromosome 6 (mouse)
Band	6|6 A3.3	Start	30,611,009 bp
Band	6|6 A3.3	End	30,631,744 bp
RNA expression pattern
Bgee	Human / Mouse (ortholog); Top expressed in: testicle; right testis; left testis; sperm; gonad; lymph node; body of pancreas; pituitary gland; anterior pituitary; spleen / Top expressed in: spermatid; seminiferous tubule; spermatocyte; embryo; embryo; morula; yolk sac; genital tubercle; islet of Langerhans; trachea; More reference expression data
BioGPS	n/a
Gene ontology
Molecular function	carboxypeptidase activity; zinc ion binding; peptidase activity; hydrolase activity; metallopeptidase activity; metal ion binding; metallocarboxypeptidase activity
Cellular component	extracellular region; extracellular space
Biological process	proteolysis
Sources:Amigo / QuickGO
Orthologs
Databases	NCBI: entry; OMA: entry
Species	Human	Mouse
Entrez	93979	74649
Ensembl	ENSG00000158525	ENSMUSG00000029788
UniProt	Q8WXQ8	Q8R4H4
RefSeq (mRNA)	NM_001127441; NM_001127442; NM_080385; NM_001318223	NM_144537
RefSeq (protein)	NP_001120913; NP_001120914; NP_001305152; NP_525124	NP_653120
Location (UCSC)	Chr 7: 130.34 – 130.37 Mb	Chr 6: 30.61 – 30.63 Mb
PubMed search
- Wikidata
View/Edit Human	View/Edit Mouse

Carboxypeptidase A5 is an enzyme that in humans is encoded by the CPA5 gene.

Carboxypeptidases have functions ranging from digestion of food to selective biosynthesis of neuroendocrine peptides. Members of the A/B subfamily of carboxypeptidases, such as CPA5, contain an approximately 90-amino acid pro region that assists in the folding of the active carboxypeptidase domain. Cleavage of the pro region activates the enzyme (Wei et al., 2002).[supplied by OMIM]
