= Scaffold (disambiguation) =

A scaffold, or scaffolding, in construction, is a temporary structure that supports workers and equipment above the ground or floor.

Scaffold and scaffolding may also refer to:

== Structures ==
- Scaffold (execution site), a raised, stage-like site for public executions
- Scaffold (barn), a raised structure on which crops are stored

== Science and technology ==
- Scaffold protein, a regulator of cell signalling pathways
- Scaffold, a protein that is used as a starting point for the design of antibody mimetics
- Tissue scaffold, in tissue engineering, an artificial structure capable of supporting three-dimensional tissue formation
  - Nano-scaffold, a medical process
- Scaffolding (bioinformatics), a technique in bioinformatics
- Scaffold (programming), two techniques in software architecture

== Arts and entertainment ==
- The Scaffold, an English music and comedy group
- "The Scaffold", song by Elton John from Empty Sky
- Scaffolding (film), a 2017 film

== Other uses ==
- Instructional scaffolding, an education concept and practice
