= Carboxypeptidase B2 =

Enzyme encoded in humans by the gene CPB2

CPB2
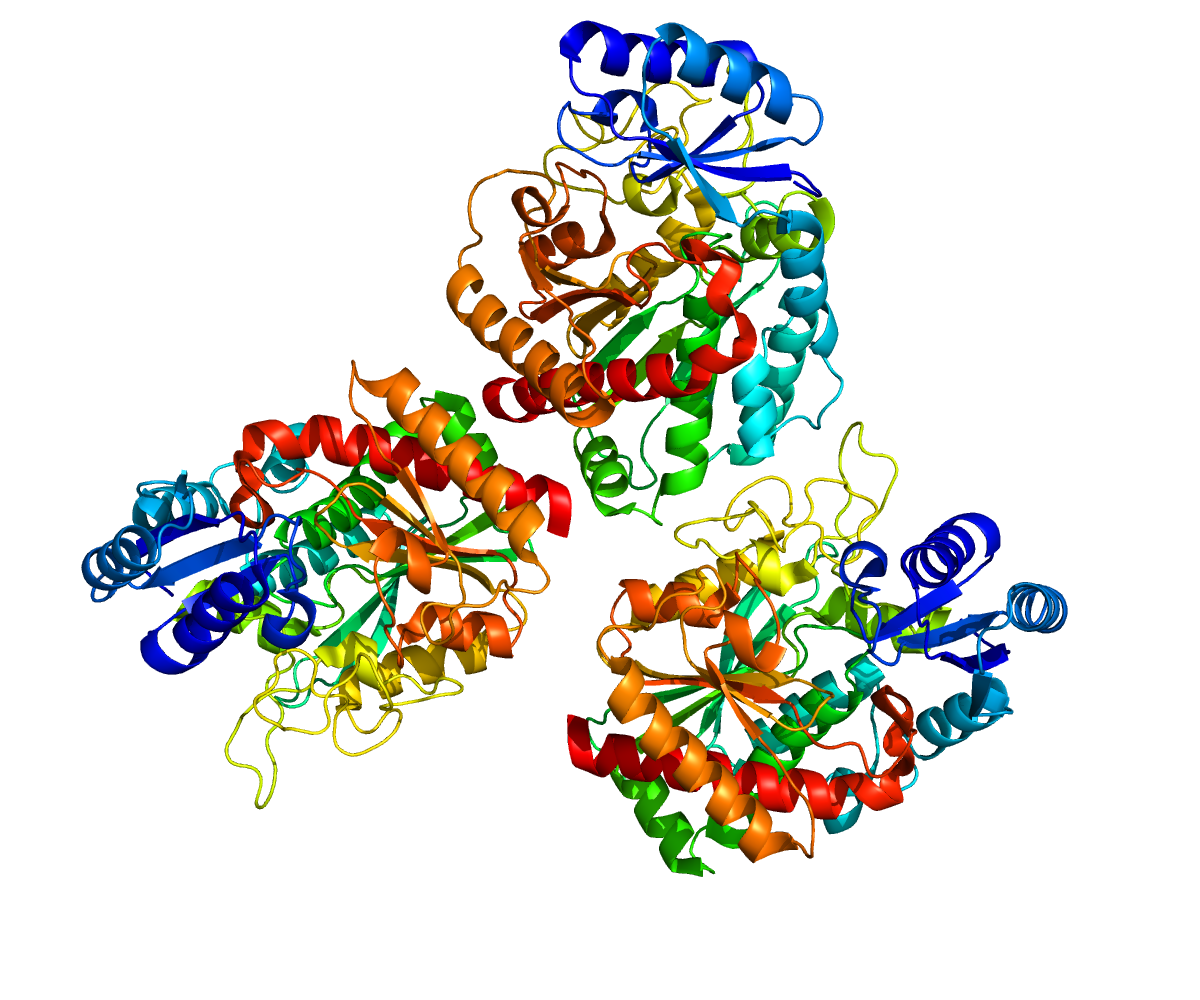

Identifiers
- Aliases: CPB2, CPU, PCPB, TAFI, carboxypeptidase B2
- External IDs: OMIM: 603101; MGI: 1891837; GeneCards: CPB2
Available structures
PDB	Ortholog search: PDBe RCSB
PDB	List of PDB id codes 3D66, 3D67, 3D68, 3LMS, 4P10, 5HVG, 5HVH, 5HVF
Enzyme activity
EC #	BRENDA	ExPASy	KEGG	MetaCyc
3.4.17.20	↗	↗	↗	↗

Gene location (Human)
Chr.	Chromosome 13 (human)
Band	13q14.13	Start	46,053,186 bp
Band	13q14.13	End	46,105,033 bp

Gene location (Mouse)
Chr.	Chromosome 14 (mouse)
Band	14|14 D3	Start	75,479,727 bp
Band	14|14 D3	End	75,520,995 bp
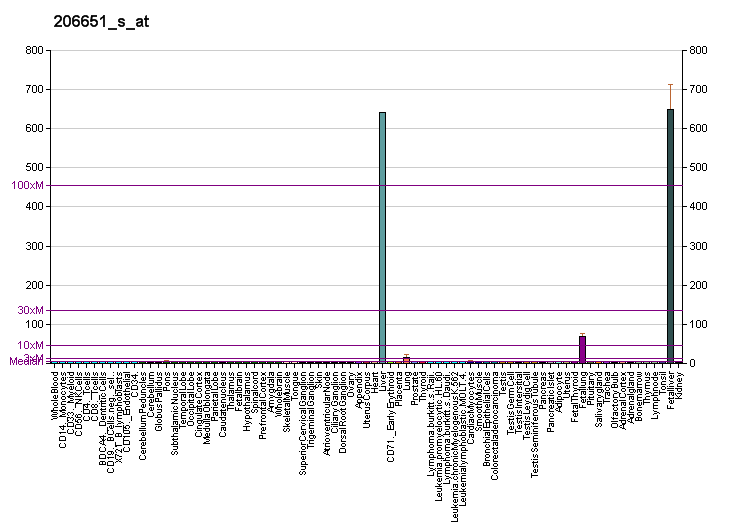
RNA expression pattern
Bgee	Human / Mouse (ortholog); Top expressed in: right lobe of liver; lower lobe of lung; corpus epididymis; tail of epididymis; right lung; testicle; gallbladder; upper lobe of lung; upper lobe of left lung; visceral pleura / Top expressed in: left lobe of liver; primary oocyte; zygote; secondary oocyte; human fetus; fetal liver hematopoietic progenitor cell; urethra; sexually immature organism; morula; embryo; More reference expression data
BioGPS	More reference expression data
Gene ontology
Molecular function	metal ion binding; peptidase activity; hydrolase activity; zinc ion binding; carboxypeptidase activity; metallopeptidase activity; metallocarboxypeptidase activity
Cellular component	extracellular exosome; extracellular space; extracellular region
Biological process	blood coagulation; negative regulation of hepatocyte proliferation; positive regulation of extracellular matrix constituent secretion; liver regeneration; cellular response to glucose stimulus; negative regulation of plasminogen activation; negative regulation of fibrinolysis; response to heat; hemostasis; proteolysis; fibrinolysis; regulation of complement activation
Sources:Amigo / QuickGO
Orthologs
Databases	NCBI: entry; OMA: entry
Species	Human	Mouse
Entrez	1361	56373
Ensembl	ENSG00000080618	ENSMUSG00000021999
UniProt	Q96IY4	Q9JHH6
RefSeq (mRNA)	NM_016413; NM_001278541; NM_001872	NM_019775
RefSeq (protein)	NP_001265470; NP_001863	NP_062749
Location (UCSC)	Chr 13: 46.05 – 46.11 Mb	Chr 14: 75.48 – 75.52 Mb
PubMed search
- Wikidata
View/Edit Human	View/Edit Mouse

Carboxypeptidase B2 (CPB2), also known as carboxypeptidase U (CPU), plasma carboxypeptidase B (pCPB) or thrombin-activatable fibrinolysis inhibitor (TAFI), is an enzyme that, in humans, is encoded by the gene CPB2.

== Function ==
CPB2 is synthesized by the liver and circulates in the plasma as a plasminogen-bound zymogen. When it is activated by proteolysis at residue Arg92 by the thrombin/thrombomodulin complex, CPB2 exhibits carboxypeptidase activity. Activated CPB2 reduces fibrinolysis by removing the fibrin C-terminal residues that are important for the binding and activation of plasminogen.

Carboxypeptidases are enzymes that hydrolyze C-terminal peptide bonds. The carboxypeptidase family includes metallo-, serine, and cysteine carboxypeptidases. According to their substrate specificity, these enzymes are referred to as carboxypeptidase A (cleaving aliphatic residues) or carboxypeptidase B (cleaving basic amino residues). The protein encoded by this gene is activated by thrombin and acts on carboxypeptidase B substrates. After thrombin activation, the mature protein downregulates fibrinolysis.

Fibrinolysis (simplified). Blue arrows denote stimulation, and red arrows inhibition.

== Isozymes ==
Polymorphisms have been described for this gene and its promoter region. Available sequence data analyses indicate splice variants that encode different isoforms.

== See also ==
- Carboxypeptidase B
