= Hyperproinsulinemia =

- This condition is inherited in an autosomal dominant manner.

Hyperproinsulinemia is a disease where insulin is not sufficiently processed before secretion and immature forms of insulin make up the majority of circulating insulin immunoreactivity in both fasting and glucose-stimulated conditions (insulin immunoreactivity refers to all molecules detectable by an insulin antibody, i.e. insulin, proinsulin, and proinsulin-like material). The term is composed of hyper - high, proinsulin - immature insulin molecule, and -emia - blood condition.

Hyperproinsulinemia is more frequent in type 2 diabetes. It has been attributed to either a direct β-cells defect or an indirect effect of cell dysregulation under sustained elevated blood glucose (hyperglycemia).

Some alleles of insulin can cause hyperproinsulinemia (see table 2: monogenic forms of type 1 diabetes, INS (insulin). For a more detailed descriptions of the insulin gene variations leading to hyperproinsulinemia see NCBI's OMIM 176730
