= Membrane Pro-X carboxypeptidase =

Membrane Pro-Xaa carboxypeptidase

Identifiers
- EC no.: 3.4.17.16
- CAS no.: 9075-64-3

Databases
- IntEnz: IntEnz view
- BRENDA: BRENDA entry
- ExPASy: NiceZyme view
- KEGG: KEGG entry
- MetaCyc: metabolic pathway
- PRIAM: profile
- PDB structures: RCSB PDB PDBe PDBsum
Search
- PMC: articles
- PubMed: articles
- NCBI: proteins

Membrane Pro-Xaa carboxypeptidase (EC 3.4.17.16, carboxypeptidase P, microsomal carboxypeptidase) is an enzyme. This enzyme catalyses the following chemical reaction

Release of a C-terminal residue other than proline, by preferential cleavage of a prolyl bond

This is one of the renal brush border exopeptidases
