= Metalloproteinase =

Type of enzyme

Peptidase_M48
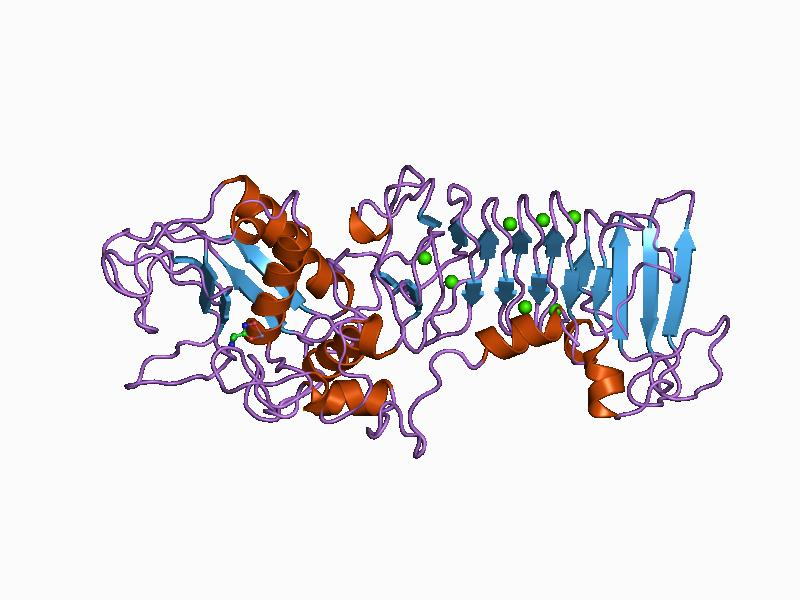

Identifiers
- Symbol: Peptidase_M48
- Pfam: PF01435
- Pfam clan: CL0126
- InterPro: IPR001915
- MEROPS: M48
- OPM superfamily: 394
- OPM protein: 4aw6
- Membranome: 317
Available protein structures:
- PDB: IPR001915 PF01435 (ECOD; PDBsum)
- AlphaFold: IPR001915; PF01435

Peptidase_M50

Identifiers
- Symbol: Peptidase_M50
- Pfam: PF02163
- Pfam clan: CL0126
- InterPro: IPR008915
- MEROPS: M50
- OPM superfamily: 184
- OPM protein: 3b4r
Available protein structures:
- PDB: IPR008915 PF02163 (ECOD; PDBsum)
- AlphaFold: IPR008915; PF02163

A metalloproteinase, or metalloprotease, is any protease enzyme whose catalytic mechanism involves a metal. An example is ADAM12 which plays a significant role in the fusion of muscle cells during embryo development, in a process known as myogenesis.

Most metalloproteases require zinc, but some use cobalt. The metal ion is coordinated to the protein via three ligands. The ligands coordinating the metal ion can vary with histidine, glutamate, aspartate, lysine, and arginine. The fourth coordination position is taken up by a labile water molecule.

Treatment with chelating agents such as EDTA leads to complete inactivation. EDTA is a metal chelator that removes zinc, which is essential for activity. They are also inhibited by the chelator orthophenanthroline.

== Classification ==
There are two subgroups of metalloproteinases:

- Exopeptidases, metalloexopeptidases (EC number: 3.4.17).
- Endopeptidases, metalloendopeptidases (3.4.24). Well known metalloendopeptidases include ADAM proteins and matrix metalloproteinases, and M16 metalloproteinases such as Insulin Degrading Enzyme and Presequence Protease

In the MEROPS database peptidase families are grouped by their catalytic type, the first character representing the catalytic type: A, aspartic; C, cysteine; G, glutamic acid; M, metallo; S, serine; T, threonine; and U, unknown. The serine, threonine and cysteine peptidases utilise the amino acid as a nucleophile and form an acyl intermediate - these peptidases can also readily act as transferases. In the case of aspartic, glutamic and metallopeptidases, the nucleophile is an activated water molecule. In many instances, the structural protein fold that characterises the clan or family may have lost its catalytic activity, yet retained its function in protein recognition and binding.

Metalloproteases are the most diverse of the four main protease types, with more than 50 families classified to date. In these enzymes, a divalent cation, usually zinc, activates the water molecule. The metal ion is held in place by amino acid ligands, usually three in number. The known metal ligands are histidine, glutamate, aspartate or lysine and at least one other residue is required for catalysis, which may play an electrophilic role. Of the known metalloproteases, around half contain an HEXXH motif, which has been shown in crystallographic studies to form part of the metal-binding site. The HEXXH motif is relatively common, but can be more stringently defined for metalloproteases as 'abXHEbbHbc', where 'a' is most often valine or threonine and forms part of the S1' subsite in thermolysin and neprilysin, 'b' is an uncharged residue, and 'c' a hydrophobic residue. Proline is never found in this site, possibly because it would break the helical structure adopted by this motif in metalloproteases.

Metallopeptidases from family M48 are integral membrane proteins associated with the endoplasmic reticulum and Golgi, binding one zinc ion per subunit. These endopeptidases include CAAX prenyl protease 1, which proteolytically removes the C-terminal three residues of farnesylated proteins.

Metalloproteinase inhibitors are found in numerous marine organisms, including fish, cephalopods, mollusks, algae and bacteria.

Members of the M50 metallopeptidase family include: mammalian sterol-regulatory element binding protein (SREBP) site 2 protease and Escherichia coli protease EcfE, stage IV sporulation protein FB.

== See also ==
- Matrix metalloproteinase
- The Proteolysis Map
