= Lysosomal Pro-X carboxypeptidase =

Lysosomal Pro-Xaa carboxypeptidase

Identifiers
- EC no.: 3.4.16.2
- CAS no.: 9075-64-3

Databases
- BRENDA: enzyme data
- ExPASy: NiceZyme view
- KEGG: enzyme entry
- MetaCyc: metabolic pathway
- Rhea: reactions
- PDB structures: RCSB PDB PDBe PDBsum
Search
- PMC: articles
- PubMed: articles
- NCBI: proteins

Lysosomal Pro-Xaa carboxypeptidase (EC 3.4.16.2, angiotensinase C, lysosomal carboxypeptidase C, peptidylprolylamino acid carboxypeptidase, aminoacylproline carboxypeptidase, prolyl carboxypeptidase, carboxypeptidase P, proline-specific carboxypeptidase P, PCP) is an enzyme. This enzyme catalyses the following chemical reaction

Cleavage of a -Pro-Xaa bond to release a C-terminal amino acid

A lysosomal peptidase active at acidic pH that inactivates angiotensin II. This enzyme is inhibited by diisopropyl fluorophosphate.
