= Metalloendopeptidase =

Type of enzyme

A metalloendopeptidase is an enzyme that functions as a metalloproteinase endopeptidase.
