= Exopeptidase =

Class of enzymes

An exopeptidase is any peptidase that catalyzes the cleavage of the terminal (or the penultimate) peptide bond; the process releases a single amino acid, dipeptide or a tripeptide from the peptide chain. Depending on whether the amino acid is released from the amino or the carboxy terminal (N-terminus or C-terminus), an exopeptidase is further classified as an aminopeptidase or a carboxypeptidase, respectively. Thus, an aminopeptidase, an enzyme in the brush border of the small intestine, will cleave a single amino acid from the amino terminus, whereas carboxypeptidase, which is a digestive enzyme present in pancreatic juice, will cleave a single amino acid from the carboxylic end of the peptide.

Some examples of exopeptidases include:

- Carboxypeptidase A - cleaves C-terminal Phe, Tyr, Trp, or Leu
- Carboxypeptidase B - cleaves C-terminal Lys or Arg
- Aminopeptidase - cleaves any N-terminal amino acid
- Prolinase - cleaves N-terminal Pro from dipeptides
- Prolidase - cleaves C-terminal Pro from dipeptides

== See also ==
- The Proteolysis Map
- Endopeptidase
- Edman degradation
- Dansyl chloride
- Protease
