= Metalloexopeptidase =

Type of enzyme

A metalloexopeptidase is a type of enzyme that acts as a metalloproteinase exopeptidase. These enzymes have a catalytic mechanism involving a metal, often zinc. They function in molecular biology as agents that cut the terminal (or penultimate) peptide bonds ending peptide chains. Analogous to slicing the end off a loaf of bread, the process releases a single amino acid (or dipeptide) for use.

== Metallocarboxypeptidase ==
The terms "metallo carboxypeptidase", "metallo-carboxypeptidase" and "metallocarboxypeptidase" are used to describe a metalloexopeptidase carboxypeptidase. These peptidases specifically target the C-terminus, the unbound carboxyl group (-COOH) at one distinct end of the amino acid chain (cutting one side from a loaf of bread rather than the end).

== Enzyme Commission number ==
Using the Enzyme Commission number (EC number) system, metallocarboxypeptidases fall under EC 3.4.17. Examples of these compounds in the human genome include AGBL1 and AGBL2, known also as ATP/GTP Binding Protein-Like 1 and 2, respectively. The former resides in Chromosome 15 and is made up of 951,392 base pairs (bases) while the latter resides in Chromosome 11 and is made up of 56,221 bases.

== See also ==
- Enzyme catalysis
- Hydrolase
