= Carboxypeptidase A2 =

Protein-coding gene in the species Homo sapiens

CPA2
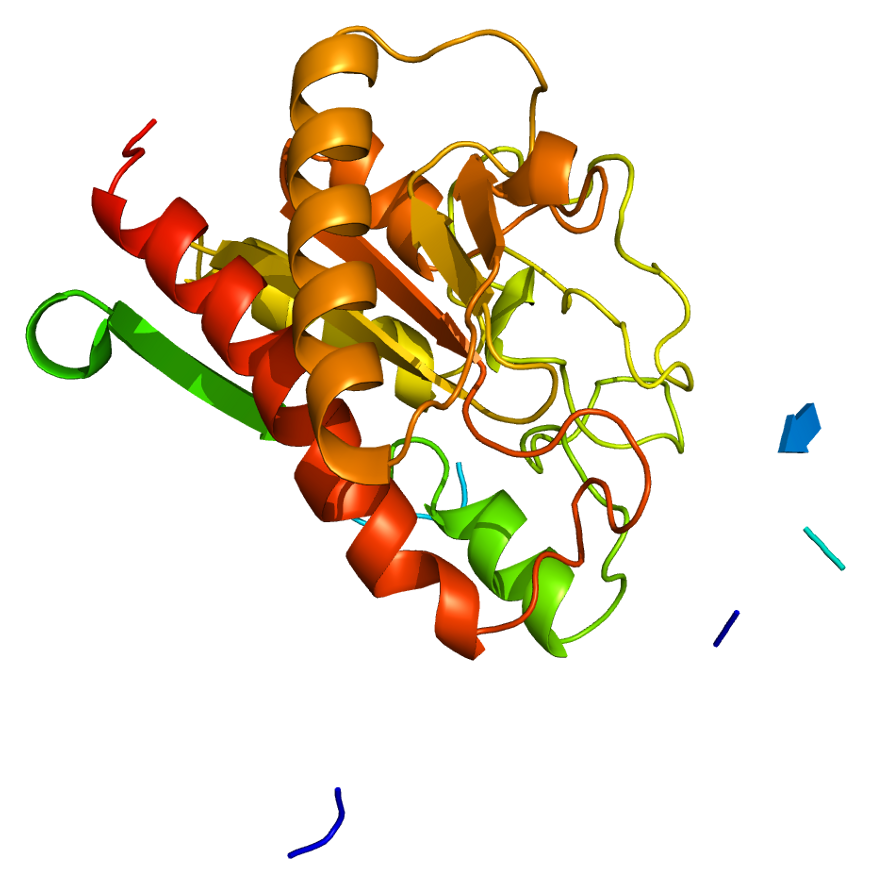

Identifiers
- Aliases: CPA2, carboxypeptidase A2
- External IDs: OMIM: 600688; MGI: 3617840; GeneCards: CPA2
Available structures
PDB	Ortholog search: PDBe RCSB
PDB	List of PDB id codes 1AYE, 1DTD, 1O6X
Enzyme activity
EC #	BRENDA	ExPASy	KEGG	MetaCyc
3.4.17.15	↗	↗	↗	↗

Gene location (Human)
Chr.	Chromosome 7 (human)
Band	7q32.2	Start	130,266,863 bp
Band	7q32.2	End	130,289,798 bp

Gene location (Mouse)
Chr.	Chromosome 6 (mouse)
Band	6|6 A3.3	Start	30,541,581 bp
Band	6|6 A3.3	End	30,564,475 bp
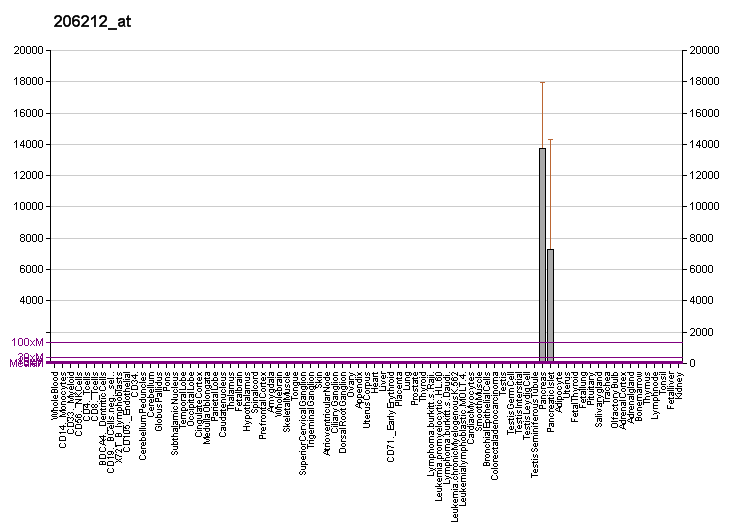
RNA expression pattern
Bgee	Human / Mouse (ortholog); Top expressed in: body of pancreas; islet of Langerhans; pancreatic epithelial cell; body of stomach; beta cell; duodenum; testicle; C1 segment; fundus; jejunal mucosa / Top expressed in: pyloric antrum; islet of Langerhans; embryo; duodenum; retinal pigment epithelium; genital tubercle; saccule; sexually immature organism; migratory enteric neural crest cell; embryo; More reference expression data
BioGPS	More reference expression data
Gene ontology
Molecular function	carboxypeptidase activity; metallopeptidase activity; zinc ion binding; peptidase activity; hydrolase activity; metallocarboxypeptidase activity; metal ion binding
Cellular component	extracellular region; vacuole; extracellular space
Biological process	proteolysis; protein catabolic process in the vacuole
Sources:Amigo / QuickGO
Orthologs
Databases	NCBI: entry; OMA: entry
Species	Human	Mouse
Entrez	1358	232680
Ensembl	ENSG00000158516	ENSMUSG00000071553
UniProt	P48052	Q504N0
RefSeq (mRNA)	NM_001869	NM_001024698
RefSeq (protein)	NP_001860	NP_001019869
Location (UCSC)	Chr 7: 130.27 – 130.29 Mb	Chr 6: 30.54 – 30.56 Mb
PubMed search
- Wikidata
View/Edit Human	View/Edit Mouse

Carboxypeptidase A2 is an enzyme that in humans is encoded by the CPA2 gene. This protein functions as a digestive enzyme which is secreted (in inactive form) into pancreatic juice by the acinar cells of the pancreas.

Three different forms of human pancreatic procarboxypeptidase A have been isolated. The A1 and A2 forms are monomeric proteins with different biochemical properties. The A2 form of pancreatic procarboxypeptidase acts on aromatic C-terminal residues
