= Carboxypeptidase A1 =

Protein-coding gene in the species Homo sapiens

CPA1
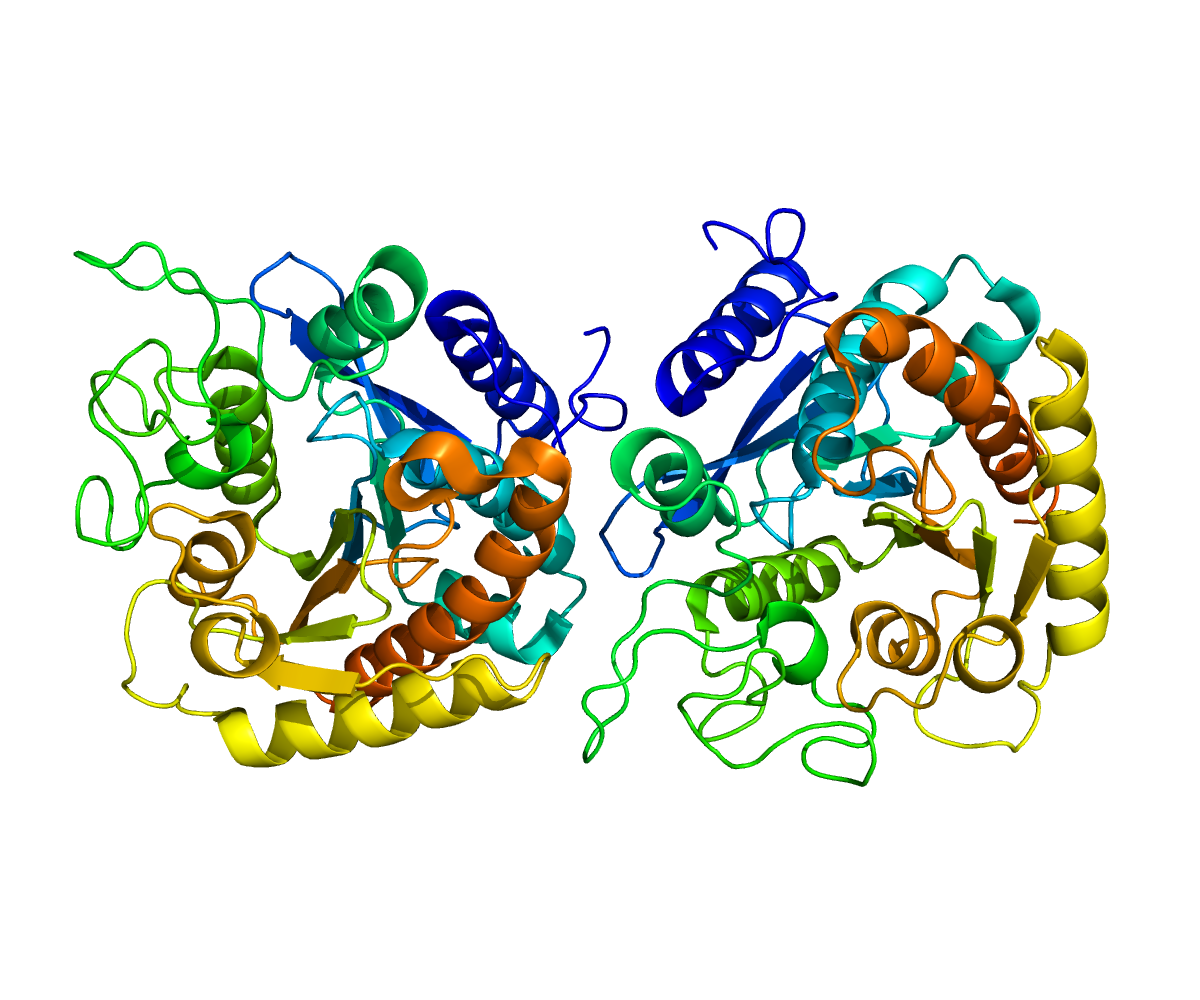

Identifiers
- Aliases: CPA1, CPA, carboxypeptidase A1
- External IDs: OMIM: 114850; MGI: 88478; GeneCards: CPA1
Available structures
PDB	Ortholog search: PDBe RCSB
PDB	List of PDB id codes 2V77, 3FJU, 4UEZ, 4UF4, 4UEE, 4UEF
Enzyme activity
EC #	BRENDA	ExPASy	KEGG	MetaCyc
3.4.17.1	↗	↗	↗	↗

Gene location (Human)
Chr.	Chromosome 7 (human)
Band	7q32.2	Start	130,380,339 bp
Band	7q32.2	End	130,388,114 bp

Gene location (Mouse)
Chr.	Chromosome 6 (mouse)
Band	6 A3.3|6 12.52 cM	Start	30,639,217 bp
Band	6 A3.3|6 12.52 cM	End	30,645,362 bp
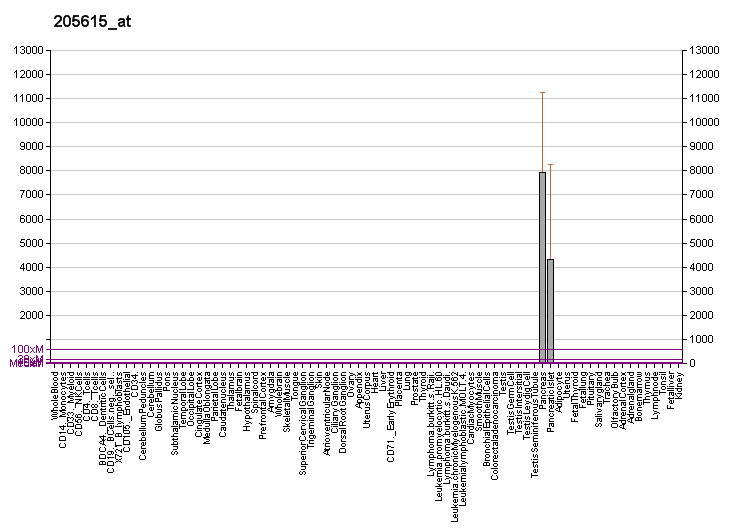
RNA expression pattern
Bgee	Human / Mouse (ortholog); Top expressed in: body of pancreas; islet of Langerhans; beta cell; testicle; ectocervix; right coronary artery; right lobe of liver; left uterine tube; canal of the cervix; right uterine tube / Top expressed in: pyloric antrum; islet of Langerhans; secondary oocyte; primary oocyte; zygote; migratory enteric neural crest cell; duodenum; embryo; sexually immature organism; Gonadal ridge; More reference expression data
BioGPS	More reference expression data
Gene ontology
Molecular function	carboxypeptidase activity; zinc ion binding; peptidase activity; exopeptidase activity; hydrolase activity; metallopeptidase activity; metal ion binding; metallocarboxypeptidase activity; protein binding
Cellular component	extracellular region; extracellular space
Biological process	proteolysis
Sources:Amigo / QuickGO
Orthologs
Databases	NCBI: entry; OMA: entry
Species	Human	Mouse
Entrez	1357	109697
Ensembl	ENSG00000091704	ENSMUSG00000054446
UniProt	P15085	Q7TPZ8
RefSeq (mRNA)	NM_001868	NM_025350
RefSeq (protein)	NP_001859	NP_079626
Location (UCSC)	Chr 7: 130.38 – 130.39 Mb	Chr 6: 30.64 – 30.65 Mb
PubMed search
- Wikidata
View/Edit Human	View/Edit Mouse

Carboxypeptidase A1 is an enzyme that in humans is encoded by the CPA1 gene. This protein functions as a digestive enzyme which is secreted (in inactive form) into pancreatic juice by the acinar cells of the pancreas.

Three different forms of human pancreatic procarboxypeptidase A have been isolated. The CPA1 and CPA2 forms are monomeric proteins with different biochemical properties. Carboxypeptidase A1 is a monomeric pancreatic exopeptidase. It is involved in zymogen inhibition.
