= Carboxypeptidase B =

Enzyme found in humans

CPB1

Identifiers
- Aliases: CPB1, CPB, PASP, PCPB, carboxypeptidase B1, Tissue carboxypeptidase B
- External IDs: OMIM: 114852; MGI: 1923953; GeneCards: CPB1
Available structures
PDB	Ortholog search: PDBe RCSB
PDB	List of PDB id codes 1ZLI, 1KWM
Enzyme activity
EC #	BRENDA	ExPASy	KEGG	MetaCyc
3.4.17.2	↗	↗	↗	↗

Gene location (Human)
Chr.	Chromosome 3 (human)
Band	3q24	Start	148,791,102 bp
Band	3q24	End	148,860,187 bp

Gene location (Mouse)
Chr.	Chromosome 3 (mouse)
Band	3 A2|3 6.29 cM	Start	20,302,428 bp
Band	3 A2|3 6.29 cM	End	20,329,897 bp
RNA expression pattern
Bgee	Human / Mouse (ortholog); Top expressed in: body of pancreas; islet of Langerhans; beta cell; right adrenal cortex; left adrenal cortex; spleen; testicle; gonad; body of stomach; ectocervix / Top expressed in: pyloric antrum; islet of Langerhans; duodenum; sexually immature organism; secondary oocyte; zygote; spinal ganglia; primary oocyte; adrenal gland; calvaria; More reference expression data
BioGPS	n/a
Gene ontology
Molecular function	carboxypeptidase activity; peptidase activity; zinc ion binding; hydrolase activity; metallopeptidase activity; metal ion binding; metallocarboxypeptidase activity
Cellular component	extracellular region; extracellular space
Biological process	proteolysis
Sources:Amigo / QuickGO
Orthologs
Databases	NCBI: entry; OMA: entry
Species	Human	Mouse
Entrez	1360	76703
Ensembl	ENSG00000153002	ENSMUSG00000011463
UniProt	P15086	B2RS76
RefSeq (mRNA)	NM_001871	NM_029706
RefSeq (protein)	NP_001862	NP_083982
Location (UCSC)	Chr 3: 148.79 – 148.86 Mb	Chr 3: 20.3 – 20.33 Mb
PubMed search
- Wikidata
View/Edit Human	View/Edit Mouse

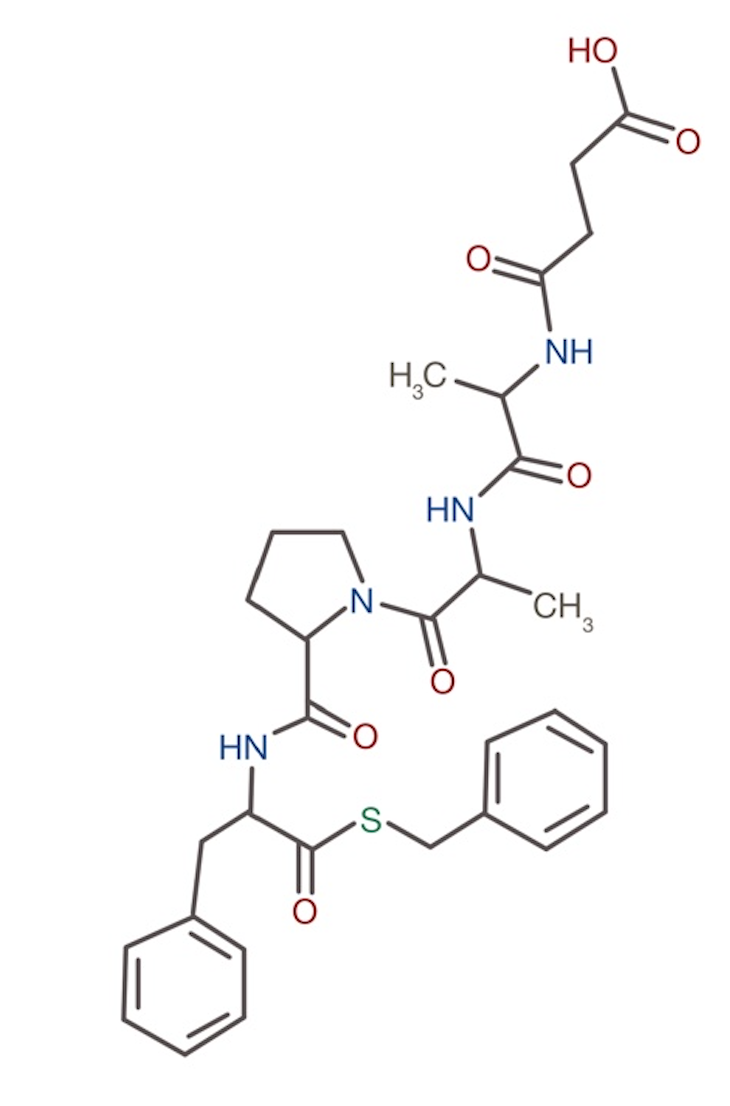

Carboxypeptidase B (EC 3.4.17.2), sometimes also called Carboxypeptidase B1, is an enzyme that in humans is encoded by the CPB1 gene. Carboxypeptidase B is a carboxypeptidase that preferentially cleaves off basic amino acids arginine and lysine from the C-terminus of a peptide. This enzyme is secreted by the acinar cells of the pancreas, and it travels to the small intestine, where it aids in protein digestion.

Carboxypeptidase B2 (EC 3.4.17.20), sometimes called Plasma carboxypeptidase B, is a related but distinct enzyme responsible for converting the C5a protein into C5a des-Arg, with one less amino acid.

== Other names ==
It has also been called protaminase, pancreatic carboxypeptidase B, tissue carboxypeptidase B, and peptidyl-L-lysine [L-arginine]hydrolase.
