= Carboxypeptidase =

Class of enzymes

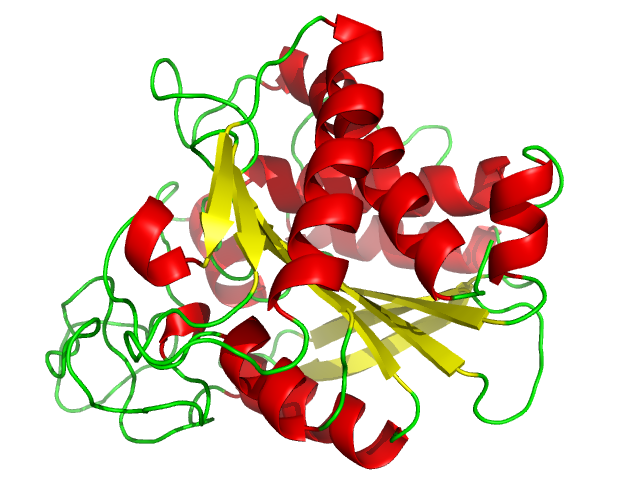
Carboxypeptidase A, from bovine pancreas

A carboxypeptidase (EC number 3.4.16 - 3.4.18) is a protease enzyme that hydrolyzes (cleaves) a peptide bond at the carboxy-terminal (C-terminal) end of a protein or peptide. This is in contrast to an aminopeptidases, which cleave peptide bonds at the N-terminus of proteins. Humans, animals, bacteria and plants contain several types of carboxypeptidases that have diverse functions ranging from catabolism to protein maturation. At least two mechanisms have been discussed.

== Functions ==
Initial studies on carboxypeptidases focused on pancreatic carboxypeptidases A1, A2, and B in the digestion of food. Most carboxypeptidases are not, however, involved in catabolism. Instead they help to mature proteins, for example post-translational modification. They also regulate biological processes, such as the biosynthesis of neuroendocrine peptides such as insulin requires a carboxypeptidase. Carboxypeptidases also function in blood clotting, growth factor production, wound healing, reproduction, and many other processes.

== Mechanism ==
Carboxypeptidases hydrolyze peptides at the first amide or polypeptide bond on the C-terminal end of the chain. Carboxypeptidases act by replacing the substrate water with a carbonyl (C=O) group. The carboxypeptidase A hydrolysis reaction has two mechanistic hypotheses, via a nucleophilic water and via an anhydride.

In the first proposed mechanism, a promoted-water pathway is favoured as Glu270 deprotonates the nucleophilic water. The Zn^{2+} ion, along with positively charged residues, decreases the pKa of the bound water to approximately 7. Glu 270 has a dual role in this mechanism as it acts as a base to allow for the attack at the amide carbonyl group during nucleophilic addition. It acts as an acid during elimination when the water proton is transferred to the leaving nitrogen group. The oxygen on the amide carbonyl group does not coordinate to the Zn^{2+} until the addition of the water. The deprotonation of the Zn^{2+} coordinated water by Glu 270 provides an activated hydroxide nucleophile which attacks the amide carbonyl group in the peptide bond in a nucleophilic addition. The negatively charged intermediates that are formed during hydrolysis are stabilized by the Zn^{2+} ion. The interaction between the carbonyl group and the neighbouring arginine, Arg 217, also stabilizes the negatively charged intermediates. The zinc-bound hydroxide interacts with the amide with the electrostatic stabilization of the transition state provided by the Zn^{2+} ion and the neighbouring arginine.

The second proposed mechanism via an anhydride has similar steps but there is a direct attack of Glu270 on the carbonyl group, and then the interaction of Glu270 on the Zn^{2+}-bound amide forms an anhydride instead which can subsequently be hydrolyzed by water.

== Classifications ==
=== By active site mechanism ===
Carboxypeptidases are usually classified into one of several families based on their active site mechanism.

- Enzymes that use a metal in the active site are called "metallo-carboxypeptidases" (EC number 3.4.17).
- Other carboxypeptidases that use active site serine residues are called "serine carboxypeptidases" (EC number 3.4.16).
- Those that use an active site cysteine are called "cysteine carboxypeptidase" (or "thiol carboxypeptidases")(EC number 3.4.18).

These names do not refer to the selectivity of the amino acid that is cleaved.

=== By substrate preference ===
Another classification system for carboxypeptidases refers to their substrate preference.

- In this classification system, carboxypeptidases that have a stronger preference for those amino acids containing aromatic or branched hydrocarbon chains are called carboxypeptidase A (A for aromatic/aliphatic).
- Carboxypeptidases that cleave positively charged amino acids (arginine, lysine) are called carboxypeptidase B (B for basic).

A metallo-carboxypeptidase that cleaves a C-terminal glutamate from the peptide N-acetyl-L-aspartyl-L-glutamate is called "glutamate carboxypeptidase".

A serine carboxypeptidase that cleaves the C-terminal residue from peptides containing the sequence -Pro-Xaa (Pro is proline, Xaa is any amino acid on the C-terminus of a peptide) is called "prolyl carboxypeptidase".

== Activation ==
Some, but not all, carboxypeptidases are initially produced in an inactive form; this precursor form is referred to as a procarboxypeptidase. In the case of pancreatic carboxypeptidase A, the inactive zymogen form - pro-carboxypeptidase A - is converted to its active form - carboxypeptidase A - by the enzyme trypsin. This mechanism ensures that the acinar cells wherein pro-carboxypeptidase A is produced are not themselves digested.

== See also ==
- Carboxypeptidase E
- Carboxypeptidase A
- Enzyme category EC number 3.4
- Thrombin-activatable fibrinolysis inhibitor aka plasma carboxypeptidase B2
- Bacterial transpeptidase, an alanine carboxypeptidase
- Bradykinin is broken down among other enzymes by carboxypeptidase N
- DD-Ala carboxypeptidase is a penicillin-binding protein
- Phenylalanine might inhibit carboxypeptidase A
- Martha L. Ludwig
