= Acinar cell =

Cell type in the exocrine pancreas

Acinar cell of pancreas
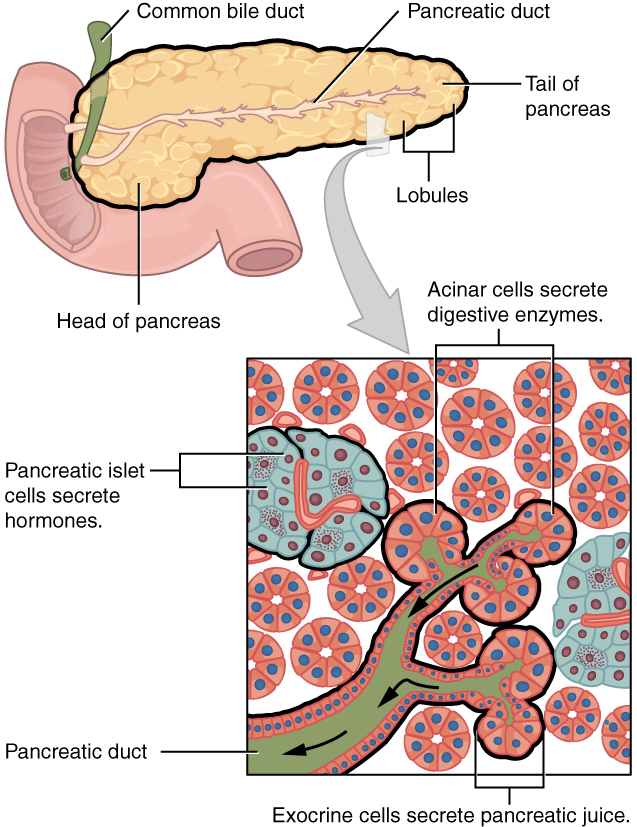
- A diagram of the acinar cells and ducts of the pancreas

Details
- Pronunciation: /ˈæs.ə.nɑːr sel/
- System: Digestive system
- Location: Pancreas
- Shape: Pyramidal
- Function: Digestive enzyme production

Identifiers
- FMA: 63032

Acinar cells are the primary digestive enzyme secreting cells of the pancreas. Together with the bicarbonate-producing ductal cells, they are one of the main types of exocrine cell found in the pancreas. Acinar cells are located around special cavities called acini (meaning: “berry in a cluster”) which is the origin of their name.

== Function ==
Acinar cells synthesize digestive enzymes, which they store in small cellular compartments called granules. These enzymes are released when the cells are stimulated by particular hormones (like CCK) or neurotransmitters (like acetylcholine), where they combine with water and ions to form pancreatic juice, which eventually flows into the first part of the intestines (the duodenum). In the duodenum, the enzymes in the pancreatic juice break down food molecules such as proteins and fats, allowing them to eventually be absorbed by the small intestines.

== Major secreted enzymes ==
=== Proenzymes ===
Certain enzymes could damage the pancreas if they were allowed to act on pancreatic cells, so instead they are kept in an inactive form. These inactive enzymes are called proenzymes (or zymogens). In particular, this is the case for enzymes that break down proteins and peptides (proteases) and enzymes that break down phospholipids (phospholipases) which are a major component of cell membranes.

After reaching the intestines, the intestinal enzyme enteropeptidase (sometimes misleadingly also called enterokinase) activates some of the proenzyme trypsinogen into active trypsin. The newly activated trypsin (and other pancreas enzymes like chymotrypsin-C) then activate the other proenzymes, including any remaining trypsinogen.

Note: the names of proenzymes are typically distinguished from their active form by adding a “pro-” prefix, or an “-ogen” suffix, so for example, trypsinogen is the inactive proenzyme for trypsin.

- Trypsinogen (1, 2, 3) — Endopeptidase (type of protease that cleaves protein/peptide bonds near the middle).
- Chymotrypsinogen (B1, B2) — Endopeptidase.
- Chymotrypsinogen-C — Protease that works together with trypsin to activate procarboxypeptidases A1 and A2.
- Pancreatic proelastase II (CELA2A, CELA2B) — Endopeptidase which can break down elastin.
- Pancreatic proendopeptidase E (CELA3A, CELA3B) — Elastase family endopeptidase that mostly doesn't act on elastin.
- Procarboxypeptidase (A1, A2, B1) — proteases that cleave protein/peptide bonds near one end (specifically the C-terminus).
- Prophospholipase (A2 group IB) — breaks down phospholipids, producing especially lysophosphatidylcholine.

=== Active enzymes ===
Other enzymes are stored in active form, probably because they are unlikely to encounter their target molecules in the pancreas.

- α-Amylase (2A, 2B) — breaks down carbohydrates, especially large carbohydrates like starch or glycogen.
- Pancreatic lipase — breaks down fats, especially triglycerides and diglycerides.
- Carboxyl ester lipase — breaks down more general lipids, especially cholesterol esters and monoglycerides.
- DNase-1 — breaks down DNA.
- Pancreatic RNase — breaks down RNA (both single- and double-stranded).

=== Coenzymes ===
- Colipase — protein that binds to pancreatic lipase and helps it function more efficiently.

== Stimulation of enzyme secretion ==
A large number of hormones and neurotransmitters have been implicated in regulating the secretion of digestive enzymes from acinar cells, and these have different impacts at different phases of digestion.

=== Nervous system stimulation ===
First, anticipation of food driven by the senses (including sight, smell, and taste) triggers the release of digestive enzymes. This appears to be driven by the unconscious nervous system. In particular, the vagus nerve directly signals to acinar cells using neurotransmitters, especially acetylcholine.

Next, after food enters and stretches the stomach, this triggers additional signaling from the vagus nerve, similarly leading to enzyme secretion.

While acetylcholine appears to have a central role in these processes, many other neurotransmitters appear to also play a part, including Gastrin-releasing peptide, Substance P, and vasoactive intestinal peptide.

=== Hormonal stimulation ===
After food reaches the start of the intestines (the duodenum), proteins and fats trigger intestinal I cells to release the hormone cholecystokinin (CCK), while gastric acid triggers S cells to release secretin. These each stimulate the pancreas to release pancreatic juice in a different way, and together with the additional neuronal stimulation during this phase account for 50-80% of total pancreatic secretion.

In the pancreas, CCK primarily stimulates acinar cells to release enzymes, while secretin primarily stimulates ductal cells to release bicarbonate. Nevertheless, this is not a hard distinction, and secretin also directly stimulates acinar cells.

CCK and secretin are the primary hormones regulating this intestinal phase, but other hormones like insulin are also involved in regulating digestive enzyme release.

=== Receptors ===
In acinar cells, most of the main secretion regulating hormones/neurotransmitters bind to a type of membrane receptor called G protein-coupled receptors. Notably, CCK binds to the cholecystokinin A receptor, while acetylcholine binds to the muscarinic acetylcholine receptors CHRM1 and CHRM3, with CHRM3 probably being the primary one given its greater expression in acinar cells.

More generally the G-coupled receptors tend to fall into two groups. The CCK, Acetylcholine, Gastric-releasing peptide, and Substance P receptors are linked to Gq alpha subunit family G-proteins, while the secretin and vasoactive intestinal peptide receptors are linked to Gs alpha subunit family G-proteins. These act synergistic, with activation of receptors from both families leading to greater secretion than the sum of the parts.

== Medical significance ==
Acute pancreatitis (AP) is characteristically caused by damage and/or calcium-associated activation of acinar cells. This leads to an inappropriate release and activation of trypsin (and subsequently other digestive enzymes) into the pancreas, causing further acinar cell damage, and potentially death. Acute pancreatitis is one of the most common gastrointestinal conditions that leads to hospitalization. Gallstones and alcohol are the two most common causes.

Chronic pancreatitis (CP) can also be caused by problems with acinar cells. Various causes such as direct injury, alcohol abuse, and mutations affecting tryspin genes or its inhibitor SPINK1 can lead to damage to acinar cells and the subsequent activation of pancreatic stellate cells. This then causes fibrosis (scar tissue formation) and disease.

Exocrine pancreatic insufficiency (EPI) is a disorder where the pancreas fails to properly produce and secrete digestive enzymes (especially pancreatic lipase). This is frequently due to acinar cell dysfunction, and is a common symptom of diseases of the pancreas, such as pancreatitis, cystic fibrosis, and pancreatic tumors. Notably, though, it can also be caused by non-pancreatic disorders like diabetes and celiac disease. EPI is often treated by taking pancreatic enzymes as a medication to replace those that the body isn't producing.

Acinar cell carcinoma (ACC) is a rare type of pancreatic cancer where the cancer cells look and act similar to acinar cells. ACC accounts for around 1-2% of adult pancreatic cancers, and about 15% of pediatric pancreatic cancers. Distinct from other types of pancreatic cancer, ACC may lead to excessive lipase secretion (lipase hypersecretion syndrome), which can cause the death of fat tissue in the skin and bone (fat necrosis), but this doesn’t happen in all affected people.

== Cell structure ==
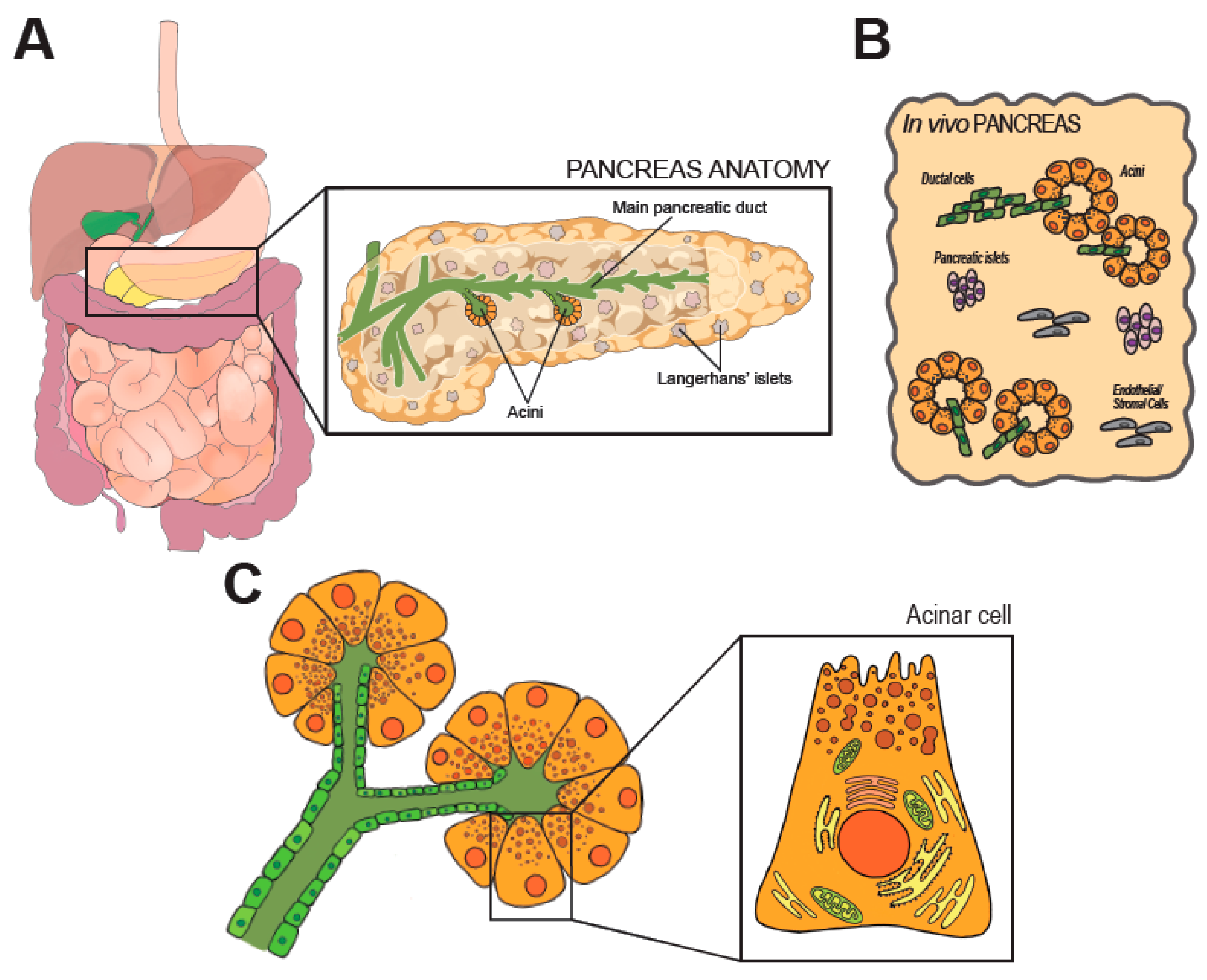
Anatomy and histology of the pancreas and acinar cells

Acinar cells are roughly pyramid-like in shape, with the top of the pyramid (apical side) facing towards the middle of the acini. On the apical side are located many membrane-bound (pro)enzyme storage structures which are called zymogen granules. These are released into the acini after activation.

The cell nucleus is located near the base of the pyramid, and is surround by an extensive rough endoplasmic reticulum which is important for the production of large quantities of proteins such as the (pro)enzymes secreted by acinar cells.

== Differentiation ==
=== Development ===
Pancreatic acini development in mice

During the development of the pancreas, acinar cells differentiate from progenitor cells in the tip epithelium. In humans, differentiation happens around gestational week 11, while in mice it happens around day 13.5 (E13.5), and is associated with the transcription factors Ptf1a, GATA4, Mist1/Bhlha15, and Nr5a2 (see § Identity maintenance factors).

=== Acinar-to-ductal metaplasia ===
Acinar cells are one of the most plastic types of cells in the adult pancreas, and are known for frequently transdifferentiating into a progenitor-like form that shares characteristics with pancreatic ductal cells. This is called acinar-to-ductal metaplasia (ADM) and has been linked to KRAS over-activation and inflammatory signaling. In human cells, it can be induced via TGFβ, and it is thought to be important for the pancreas to heal after injury. In mice, ADM can progress further and lead to pancreatic ductal adenocarcinoma; however, the link to cancer has yet to be proven in humans.

=== Identity maintenance factors ===
A number of transcription factors and regulators help maintain the differentiation of acinar cells and prevent § Acinar-to-ductal metaplasia (ADM). These include:

Note: Lower case symbols such as Ptf1a or Rbpj refer to genes/proteins that are specifically in non-human animals.

- PTF1A: The PTF1A protein forms trimeric complexes with other proteins called PTF1 complexes. These act as transcription factors that are important for pancreatic differentiation. In mice, there are two main varieties, depending on whether the complex contains Rbpj or Rbpjl. The Rbpj version is found during early organ development, where it tends to maintain pancreatic progenitor cell identity. However, it also activates the production of Rbpjl which eventually displaces it in acinar cells. Deactivating Ptaf1a in mice is sufficient to trigger ADM, suggesting that this complex also plays an important role in preserving acinar cell identity after development. This complex can recruit PCAF, an acetylase that subsequently acetylates PTF1A, and increases its transcriptional activity, though this interaction can be inhibited by CTNNBIP1. Inflammation is able to silence the mouse Ptf1a through epigenetic effects.
- BHLHA15: BHLHA15 (also called MIST1) forms a homodimer that functions as a transcription factor in the adult pancreas. In addition to being involved in preserving acinar cell identity, this transcription factor is also important for the positioning of zymogen granules, the formation of gap junctions, and other organizational functions. Mice without a functional BHLHA15 protein (or in whom homodimerization is blocked) showed a greater disposition for ADM, and other structural abnormalities.
- GATA4: though not expressed in adult mouse acinar cells, GATA4 is specifically expressed in the acini during the late gestation period. The specific role this serves in acinar cells remains to be clarified, and this later shifts to expression in a subset of alpha and beta cells instead.
- GATA6: GATA6 is a transcription factor that functions to suppress inflammatory and growth factor (EGFR) pathways, and in mouse studies this is important for preserving acinar cell identity and preventing ADM. In particular, mice without functional GATA6 suffered extensive ADM.
- CDKN1B: Nuclear CDKN1B functions to suppress the dedifferentiation-promoting factors SOX9 and PDX1 (see § Anti-identity factors)
- Other identity factors: a number of other factors have been found to be important in preserving acinar cell identity in mice, including TCF3, NR5A2, DICER1, and PAF1.

=== Anti-identity factors ===
Certain factors tend to cause acinar cells to change differentiation or dedifferentiate, and often trigger § Acinar-to-ductal metaplasia (ADM). These include:

- SOX9: SOX9 is a transcription factor primarily expressed in centroacinar cells in the healthy adult (human or mouse) pancreas. However, under inflammatory or oncogenic conditions, it becomes increasingly expressed in acinar cells. This stimulates patterns of gene expression that tend to induce ADM.
- PDX1: PDX1 is one of the earliest and most important factors required for pancreatic differentiation from the duodenum, and an absence of this factor leads to nearly complete pancreatic agenesis (in both mice and humans). However, in the adult (mouse) pancreas it is mainly restricted to certain hormone producing pancreatic islet cells such as beta cells. If instead Pdx1 expression is made to persist, acinar cells fail to develop normally, and are instead replaced with duct-like structures.
- NOTCH1: In mouse and zebrafish development, increased expression of active Notch1 suppresses acinar car differentiation, helping to keep the pancreas in an undifferentiated state. While less is known in humans, certain pancreatic cancer cells (PanIN) show increased Notch signaling. Activated NOTCH1 can induce SOX9 expression and vice versa, suggesting a role in signal amplification.
- HNF6: In both human and mouse cells, HNF6 has been shown to repress acinar cell-associated genes, and upregulate ductal cell-associated genes.
- MYC and KLF4: Factors required for ADM induction in mice.
- Abnormal organization: STK11, NUMB, and CTNND1 are proteins involved in acinar cell polarity or cell-cell contacts. In mice, knock-out of any of these genes has been shown to cause a cascade of issues including eventually ADM.

== Other notable proteins ==
Aside from the major enzymes and coenzymes, there are a number of other genes/proteins with particular specificity to acinar cells:

=== Secreted proteins ===
- Pancreatic lipase related protein 1 (PNLIPRP1) — pancreatic lipase family protein but with little to no lipase activity.
- Pancreatic lipase related protein 2 (PNLIPRP2) — lipase which is involved in neonatal digestion, but which is frequently broken in certain ethnic groups (30-50% of alleles).
- Pancreatic secretory trypsin inhibitor (SPINK1) — inhibits trypsin to help prevent premature activation of proenzymes.
- Glycoprotein 2 (GP2) — protein secreted in the pancreatic juice which is involved in the immune response to type-I-piliated bacteria.
- REG-3-gamma — anti-bacterial lectin which targets gram-positive bacteria in the intestines. It is predicted to also function as an anti-inflammatory hormone based on mouse data.
- Lithostathine-1-alpha/1-beta — proteins that may help prevent calcium carbonate from precipitating.

=== Other zymogen granule proteins ===
- Syncollin (SYCN) — protein predicted to be involved in the regulation of acinar cell secretion, and in particular the fusion of zymogen granules.
- CUB and ZP domain-containing protein 1 (CUZD1) — zymogen granule protein that is predicted to be involved in trypsinogen activation.

== See also ==
- Alveolar gland
- Gastric chief cell
