= CELA1 =

Enzyme-encoding gene in humans

Identifiers
- Aliases: CELA1, ELA1, chymotrypsin like elastase family member 1, chymotrypsin like elastase 1
- External IDs: OMIM: 130120; MGI: 95314; GeneCards: CELA1
Enzyme activity
EC #	BRENDA	ExPASy	KEGG	MetaCyc
3.4.21.36	↗	↗	↗	↗

Gene location (Human)
Chr.	Chromosome 12 (human)
Band	12q13.13	Start	51,328,442 bp
Band	12q13.13	End	51,346,679 bp

Gene location (Mouse)
Chr.	Chromosome 15 (mouse)
Band	15 F1|15 56.38 cM	Start	100,572,302 bp
Band	15 F1|15 56.38 cM	End	100,585,802 bp
RNA expression pattern
Bgee	Human / Mouse (ortholog); Top expressed in: testicle; left adrenal gland; right adrenal cortex; granulocyte; left adrenal cortex; monocyte; gonad; stromal cell of endometrium; blood; lymph node / Top expressed in: pyloric antrum; islet of Langerhans; left colon; right kidney; transitional epithelium of urinary bladder; duodenum; human kidney; lens; epithelium of stomach; epithelium of lens; More reference expression data
BioGPS	n/a
Gene ontology
Molecular function	metal ion binding; peptidase activity; serine-type peptidase activity; serine-type endopeptidase activity; hydrolase activity
Cellular component	extracellular region; extracellular space
Biological process	exocrine pancreas development; digestive system development; pancreas morphogenesis; multicellular organism growth; negative regulation of transcription by RNA polymerase II; Wnt signaling pathway; post-embryonic development; proteolysis; positive regulation of angiogenesis; regulation of cell population proliferation; regulation of cell differentiation; elastin catabolic process; inflammatory response; tissue remodeling; positive regulation of transcription by RNA polymerase II
Sources:Amigo / QuickGO
Orthologs
Databases	NCBI: entry; OMA: entry
Species	Human	Mouse
Entrez	1990	109901
Ensembl	ENSG00000139610	ENSMUSG00000023031
UniProt	Q9UNI1	Q91X79
RefSeq (mRNA)	NM_001971	NM_033612
RefSeq (protein)	NP_001962	NP_291090
Location (UCSC)	Chr 12: 51.33 – 51.35 Mb	Chr 15: 100.57 – 100.59 Mb
PubMed search
- Wikidata
View/Edit Human	View/Edit Mouse

Chymotrypsin-like elastase family member 1 (CELA1) also known as elastase-1 (ELA1) is an enzyme that in humans is encoded by the CELA1 gene. The chymotrypsin-like elastases form a subfamily of serine proteases that hydrolyze many proteins in addition to elastin. Humans have 5 genes in this subfamily which encode structurally similar enzymes, denoted CELA1, CELA2A, CELA2B, CELA3A, and CELA3B.

== Tissue distribution ==
Elastase-1 was formerly designated pancreatic elastase 1. However unlike other elastases, pancreatic elastase 1 is not expressed in the pancreas. Hence this enzyme has been renamed as elastase-1. To date, elastase 1 expression has only been detected in skin keratinocytes. Literature that describes human elastase 1 activity in the pancreas or fecal material is likely actually talking about other chymotrypsin-like elastase family members such as CELA2A or CELA3B.
