= Sclerosing polycystic adenosis =

Type of salivary gland tumor

Sclerosing polycystic adenosis (also abbreviated SPA) is a rare salivary gland tumor first described in 1996 by Dr. Brion Smith. The major salivary glands, specifically the parotid gland (about 70% of cases) and the submandibular gland, are affected most commonly. Patients usually come to clinical attention with a mass or swelling in their salivary glands in the 5th decade of life, with females affected much more commonly than males. Nearly all of the cases reported so far have a benign behavior (no recurrence and no metastasis), although there is a single case that has had an associated malignant transformation (becoming an invasive cancer).

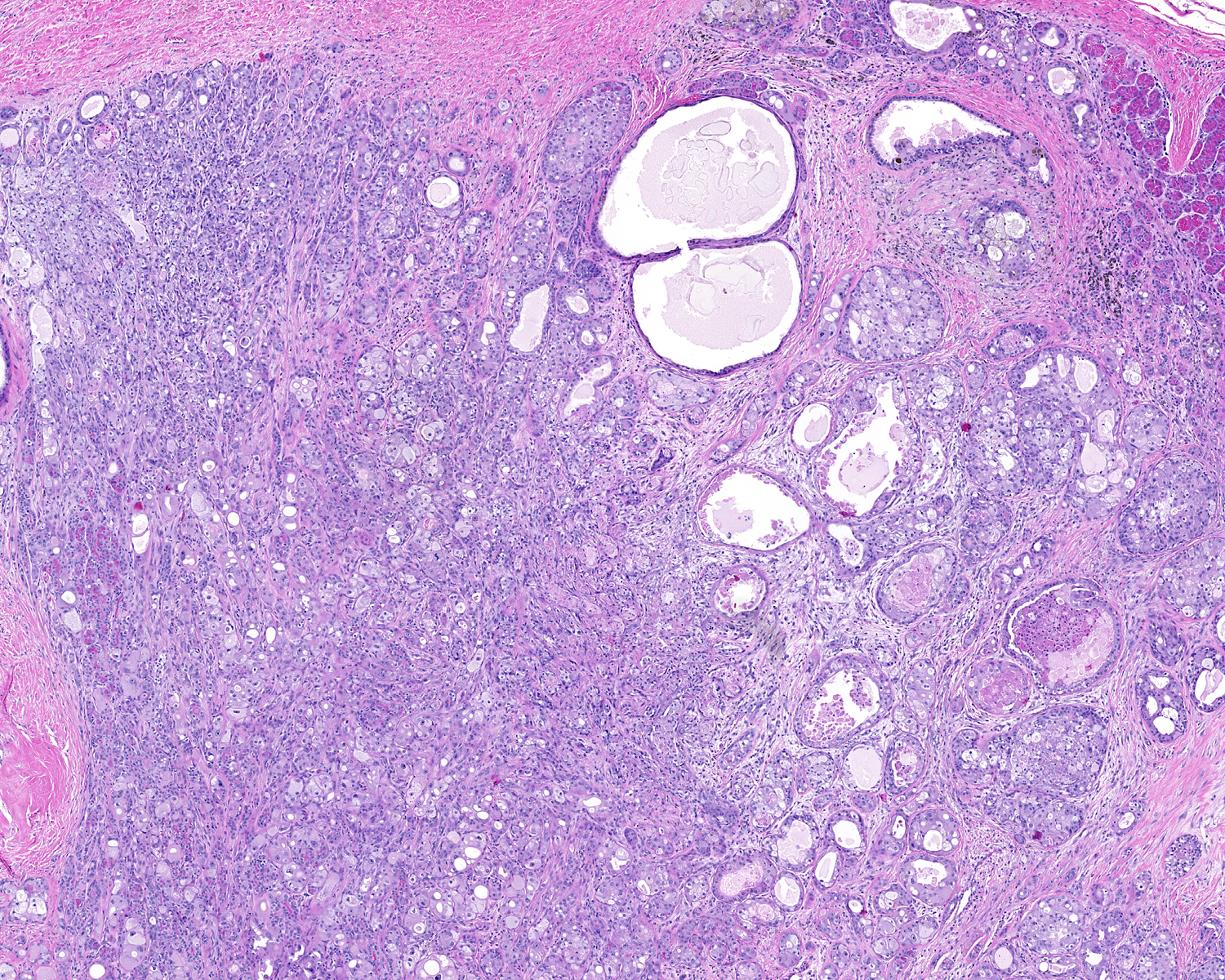
Low power H&E stained image of parotid gland sclerosing polycystic adenoma

When reviewed by a pathologist, the findings are quite similar to fibrocystic changes of the breast, although they are different enough, that it is now recognized to actually represent a true neoplasm (clonal proliferation) through various studies. Specifically, the lesions are usually well-circumscribed, containing lobules of haphazardly arranged ducts, myoepithelial cells, and acini that have abundant sclerosing or hyalinized fibrosis. Apocrine change is quite common in the ductal cells. The ducts range from small ductules to cystically dilated spaces (more than 4 striated duct-widths across), often containing products of secretion or reactive histiocytes. A very curious and characteristic finding in all of the lesions is the presence of bright pink (eosinophilic) acinar granules (which are altered zymogen).

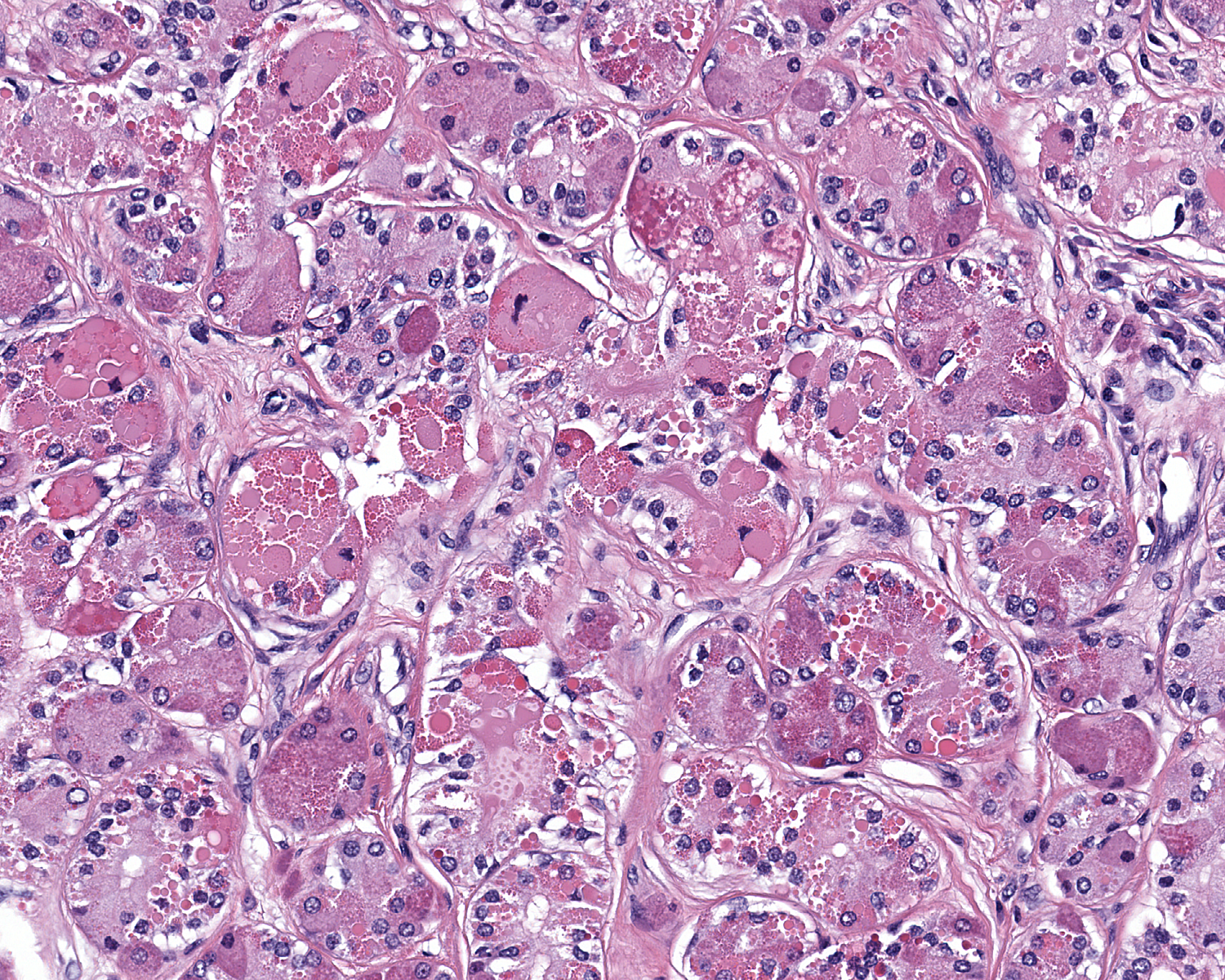
High power H&E stained image of a parotid sclerosing polycystic adenoma with eosinophilic granules
