= Syncollin =

Protein found in human pancreas

SYCN

Identifiers
- Aliases: SYCN, INSSA1, SYL, syncollin
- External IDs: MGI: 1915666; GeneCards: SYCN

Gene location (Human)
| Chr. | Chromosome 19 (human) |
| Band | 19q13.2 | Start | 39,202,825 bp |
| Band | 19q13.2 | End | 39,204,263 bp |

Gene location (Mouse)
| Chr. | Chromosome 7 (mouse) |
| Band | 7|7 A3 | Start | 28,240,310 bp |
| Band | 7|7 A3 | End | 28,241,634 bp |
RNA expression pattern
| Bgee | Human / Mouse (ortholog); Top expressed in: body of pancreas; right testis; left testis; testicle; islet of Langerhans; pancreatic epithelial cell; right coronary artery; ectocervix; body of stomach; fundus / Top expressed in: left colon; pyloric antrum; islet of Langerhans; morula; duodenum; Paneth cell; mucous cell of stomach; cervix; blastocyst; right kidney; More reference expression data |
| BioGPS | n/a |
Orthologs
| Databases | NCBI: entry; OMA: entry |
| Species | Human | Mouse |
| Entrez | 342898 | 68416 |
| Ensembl | ENSG00000179751 | ENSMUSG00000084174 |
| UniProt | Q0VAF6 | Q8VCK7 |
| RefSeq (mRNA) | NM_001080468 | NM_026716 |
| RefSeq (protein) | NP_001073937 | NP_080992 |
| Location (UCSC) | Chr 19: 39.2 – 39.2 Mb | Chr 7: 28.24 – 28.24 Mb |
| PubMed search |
- Wikidata
| View/Edit Human | View/Edit Mouse |

Syncollin is a protein that in humans is encoded by the SYCN gene. This protein is found in the acinar cells of the pancreas, and is involved their secretion of digestive enzymes (via exocytosis). Inside of acinar cells, syncollin is found in the membranes of zymogen granules which contain active and inactive digestive enzymes. It functions to regulate the merging of these granules, but does not appear to be strictly necessary for their formation.

== Interactions ==
Synocollin has been found to interact with GP2, a protein secreted by acinar cells which may have an immune function.
