= PDX1 =

Protein involved in the pancreas and duodenum differentiation

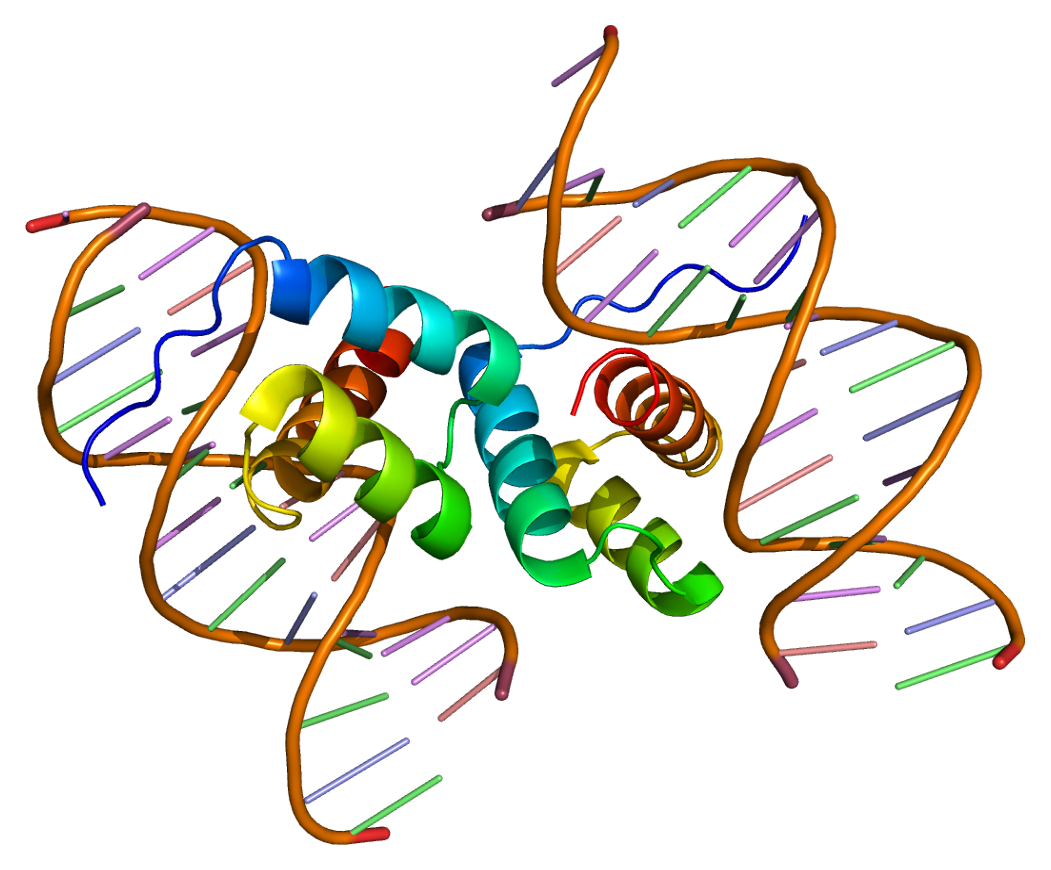

Identifiers
- Aliases: PDX1, GSF, IDX-1, IPF1, IUF1, MODY4, PAGEN1, PDX-1, STF-1, pancreatic and duodenal homeobox 1
- External IDs: OMIM: 600733; MGI: 102851; GeneCards: PDX1

Gene location (Human)
Chr.	Chromosome 13 (human)
Band	13q12.2	Start	27,920,000 bp
Band	13q12.2	End	27,926,313 bp

Gene location (Mouse)
Chr.	Chromosome 5 (mouse)
Band	5 G3|5 86.84 cM	Start	147,206,769 bp
Band	5 G3|5 86.84 cM	End	147,212,658 bp
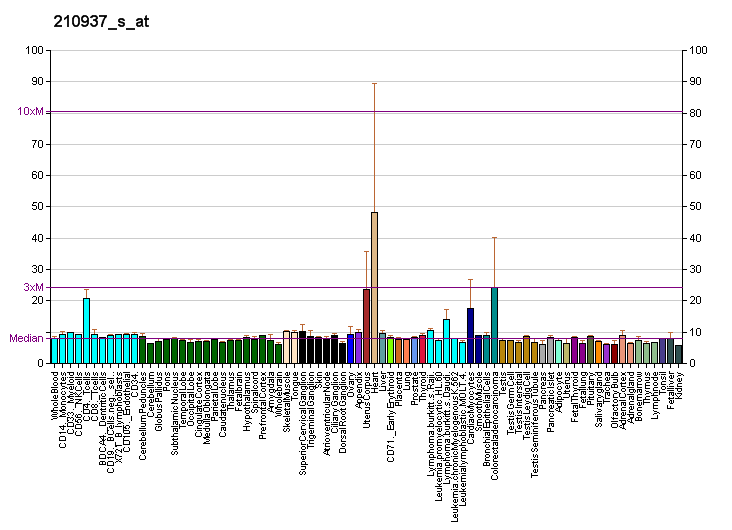

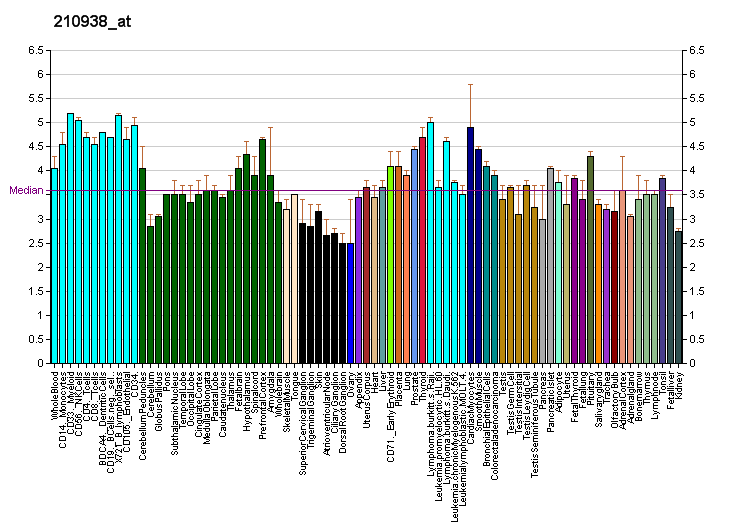
RNA expression pattern
Bgee	Human / Mouse (ortholog); Top expressed in: islet of Langerhans; body of pancreas; duodenum; gallbladder; liver; rectum; right lobe of liver; stomach; kidney; body of stomach / Top expressed in: primordial pancreas; endocrine pancreas; islet of Langerhans; duodenum; pancreatic bud; pyloric antrum; humerus; Meckel's cartilage; primary oocyte; mucous cell of stomach; More reference expression data
BioGPS	More reference expression data
Gene ontology
Molecular function	DNA binding; sequence-specific DNA binding; DNA-binding transcription factor activity; chromatin binding; RNA polymerase II cis-regulatory region sequence-specific DNA binding; DNA-binding transcription factor activity, RNA polymerase II-specific; transcription factor binding; protein-containing complex binding; protein heterodimerization activity; promoter-specific chromatin binding
Cellular component	cytoplasm; cytosol; nuclear speck; intracellular anatomical structure; nucleus; nucleoplasm
Biological process	exocrine pancreas development; negative regulation of endoplasmic reticulum stress-induced intrinsic apoptotic signaling pathway; cell differentiation; regulation of transcription, DNA-templated; glucose homeostasis; regulation of transcription by RNA polymerase II; insulin secretion; negative regulation of transcription by RNA polymerase II; generation of precursor metabolites and energy; transcription, DNA-templated; multicellular organism development; positive regulation of transcription, DNA-templated; regulation of cell population proliferation; positive regulation of cell population proliferation; nitric oxide mediated signal transduction; glucose metabolic process; animal organ morphogenesis; pancreas development; liver development; positive regulation of insulin secretion involved in cellular response to glucose stimulus; morphogenesis of embryonic epithelium; digestive tract development; negative regulation of type B pancreatic cell apoptotic process; negative regulation of cell population proliferation; positive regulation of transcription by RNA polymerase II; endocrine pancreas development; type B pancreatic cell differentiation; transcription by RNA polymerase II; detection of glucose; smoothened signaling pathway; central nervous system development; response to wounding; response to glucose; response to iron(II) ion; response to chlorate; regulation of gene expression; positive regulation of cell death; response to organic cyclic compound; animal organ regeneration; response to nutrient levels; positive regulation of insulin secretion; response to vitamin; response to lipid; response to cytokine; response to nicotine; response to leucine; response to alkaloid; positive regulation of DNA binding; negative regulation of transcription, DNA-templated; stem cell differentiation; response to glucocorticoid; transdifferentiation; response to fatty acid
Sources:Amigo / QuickGO
Orthologs
Databases	NCBI: entry; OMA: entry
Species	Human	Mouse
Entrez	3651	18609
Ensembl	ENSG00000139515	ENSMUSG00000029644
UniProt	P52945	P52946
RefSeq (mRNA)	NM_000209	NM_008814
RefSeq (protein)	NP_000200	NP_032840
Location (UCSC)	Chr 13: 27.92 – 27.93 Mb	Chr 5: 147.21 – 147.21 Mb
PubMed search
- Wikidata
View/Edit Human	View/Edit Mouse

PDX1 (pancreatic and duodenal homeobox 1), also known as insulin promoter factor 1, is a transcription factor in the ParaHox gene cluster. In vertebrates, Pdx1 is necessary for pancreatic development, including β-cell maturation, and duodenal differentiation. In humans this protein is encoded by the PDX1 gene, which was formerly known as IPF1. The gene was originally identified in the clawed frog Xenopus laevis and is present widely across the evolutionary diversity of bilaterian animals, although it has been lost in evolution in arthropods and nematodes. Despite the gene name being Pdx1, there is no Pdx2 gene in most animals; single-copy Pdx1 orthologs have been identified in all mammals. Coelacanth and cartilaginous fish are, so far, the only vertebrates shown to have two Pdx genes, Pdx1 and Pdx2.

== Function ==
=== Pancreatic development ===
In pancreatic development, Pdx1 is expressed by a population of cells in the posterior foregut region of the definitive endoderm, and Pdx1^{+} epithelial cells give rise to the developing pancreatic buds, and eventually, the whole of the pancreas—its exocrine, endocrine, and ductal cell populations. Pancreatic Pdx1^{+} cells first arise at mouse embryonic day 8.5-9.0 (E8.5-9.0), and Pdx1 expression continues until E12.0-E12.5. Homozygous Pdx1 knockout mice form pancreatic buds but fail to develop a pancreas, and transgenic mice in which tetracycline application results in death of Pdx1^{+} cells are almost completely apancreatic if doxycycline (tetracycline derivative) is administered throughout the pregnancy of these transgenic mice, illustrating the necessity of Pdx1^{+} cells in pancreatic development.

Pdx1 is accepted as the earliest marker for pancreatic differentiation, with the fates of pancreatic cells controlled by downstream transcription factors. The initial pancreatic bud is composed of Pdx1^{+} pancreatic progenitor cells that co-express Hlxb9, Hnf6, Ptf1a and NKX6-1. These cells further proliferate and branch in response to FGF-10 signaling. Afterwards, differentiation of the pancreatic cells begins; a population of cells has Notch signaling inhibited, and subsequently, expresses Ngn3. This Ngn3^{+} population is a transient population of pancreatic endocrine progenitors that gives rise to the α, β, Δ, PP, and ε cells of the islets of Langerhans. Other cells will give rise to the exocrine and ductal pancreatic cell populations.

=== β-cell maturation and survival ===
The final stages of pancreas development involves the production of different endocrine cells, including insulin-producing β-cells and glucagon-producing α-cells. Pdx1 is necessary for β-cell maturation: developing β-cells co-express Pdx1, NKX6-1, and insulin, a process that results in the silencing of MafB and the expression of MafA, a necessary switch in maturation of β-cells. At this stage of pancreas development, the experimental decrease in the expression of Pdx1 results in a production of a smaller number of β-cells and an associated increase in the number of α-cells.

In the mature pancreas, Pdx1 expression seems to be required for the maintenance and survival of β-cells. For instance, experimentally reducing the level of Pdx1 expression at this stage makes β-cells produce higher amounts of glucagon, suggesting that Pdx1 inhibits the conversion of β-cells into α-cells. Furthermore, Pdx1 appears to be important in mediating the effect of insulin on the apoptotic programmed cell death of β-cells: a small concentration of insulin protects β-cells from apoptosis, but not in cells where Pdx1 expression has been inhibited.

=== Duodenum ===
Pdx1 is necessary for the development of the proximal duodenum and maintenance of the gastro-duodenal junction. Duodenal enterocytes, Brunner's glands and entero-endocrine cells (including those in the gastric antrum) are dependent on Pdx1 expression. It is a ParaHox gene, which together with Sox2 and Cdx2, determines the correct cellular differentiation in the proximal gut. In mature mice duodenum, several genes have been identified which are dependent on Pdx1 expression and include some affecting lipid and iron absorption.

== Pathology ==
Experiments in animal models have shown that a reduction in Pdx1 expression can cause symptoms that are characteristic of Diabetes mellitus type 1 and Diabetes mellitus type 2. Furthermore, expression of Pdx1 is lost in gastric cancers, suggesting a role for the gene as a tumor suppressor. Maturity onset diabetes of the young (Type 4) can be caused by heterozygous mutations in Pdx1. The fat sand rat Psammomys obesus, a species with susceptibility to Diabetes mellitus type 2 symptoms, has a highly divergent Pdx1 gene sequence compared with other mammals.

== Interactions ==
Pdx1 has been shown to interact with MAFA.
