= ICAT =

ICAT can refer to:

- iCat, a robot toy
- ICAT Design & Media College, Chennai, Tamil Nadu, India
- International Center for Automotive Technology, Manesar, Haryana, India
- International Coalition Against Terrorism
- Isotope-coded affinity tag, a method for quantitative proteomics
- A radio station from Catalunya Ràdio.
- Another name for the protein CTNNBIP1
