= CELA3B =

Protein-coding gene in humans

Identifiers
- Aliases: CELA3B, CBPP, E1, EL-1, ELA3B, chymotrypsin like elastase family member 3B, chymotrypsin like elastase 3B
- External IDs: MGI: 1915118; GeneCards: CELA3B
Enzyme activity
EC #	BRENDA	ExPASy	KEGG	MetaCyc
3.4.21.70	↗	↗	↗	↗

Gene location (Human)
Chr.	Chromosome 1 (human)
Band	1p36.12	Start	21,977,022 bp
Band	1p36.12	End	21,998,642 bp

Gene location (Mouse)
Chr.	Chromosome 4 (mouse)
Band	4 D3|4 69.9 cM	Start	137,148,310 bp
Band	4 D3|4 69.9 cM	End	137,157,851 bp
RNA expression pattern
Bgee	Human / Mouse (ortholog); Top expressed in: body of pancreas; islet of Langerhans; testicle; body of stomach; fundus; duodenum; ectocervix; right coronary artery; right lobe of liver; placenta / Top expressed in: pyloric antrum; islet of Langerhans; duodenum; sexually immature organism; morula; embryo; esophagus; brown adipose tissue; gastric mucosa; mucous cell of stomach; More reference expression data
BioGPS	n/a
Gene ontology
Molecular function	peptidase activity; serine-type peptidase activity; hydrolase activity; serine-type endopeptidase activity
Cellular component	extracellular space
Biological process	proteolysis
Sources:Amigo / QuickGO
Orthologs
Databases	NCBI: entry; OMA: entry
Species	Human	Mouse
Entrez	23436	67868
Ensembl	ENSG00000219073	ENSMUSG00000023433
UniProt	P08861	Q9CQ52
RefSeq (mRNA)	NM_007352	NM_026419
RefSeq (protein)	NP_031378	NP_080695
Location (UCSC)	Chr 1: 21.98 – 22 Mb	Chr 4: 137.15 – 137.16 Mb
PubMed search
- Wikidata
View/Edit Human	View/Edit Mouse

Chymotrypsin-like elastase family member 3B also known as elastase-3B, or fecal elastase is an enzyme that in humans is encoded by the CELA3B gene. This protein is a digestive enzyme found in pancreatic juice which functions to break protein bonds. Like its paralog CELA3A, it functions specifically as a pancreatic endopeptidase E, and has little ability to break down elastin. It is frequently measured as a test of pancreatic function (see § Clinical significance).

The CELA3B protein was originally incorrectly identified as elastase 1, so clinical literature that describes human elastase 1 activity in the pancreas or fecal material is actually referring to chymotrypsin-like elastase family member 3B (i.e. the enzyme / protein this article focuses on).

== Function ==
Elastases form a subfamily of serine proteases that hydrolyze many proteins in addition to elastin. Humans have six elastase genes which encode the structurally similar proteins elastase 1, 2, 2A, 2B, 3A, and 3B. Unlike other elastases, elastase 3B has little elastolytic activity. Like most of the human elastases, elastase 3B is secreted from the acinar cells of the pancreas as a zymogen and, like other serine proteases such as trypsin, chymotrypsin and kallikrein, it has a digestive function in the intestine. Elastase 3B preferentially cleaves proteins after alanine residues. Elastase 3B may also function in the intestinal transport and metabolism of cholesterol. Both elastase 3A and elastase 3B have been referred to as protease E and as elastase 1, and excretion of this protein in fecal material is frequently used as a measure of pancreatic function in clinical assays.

== Clinical significance ==
Fecal elastase is a medical test that measures how well the pancreas is functioning.

The fecal elastase test measures the concentration of the elastase-3B enzyme found in fecal matter with an enzyme-linked immunosorbent assay (ELISA). Results of this test can give a good indication of exocrine pancreatic status, and the test is less invasive and expensive than the current "gold standard", secretin-cholecystokinin test. Levels of fecal elastase lower than 200 μg / g of stool indicate an exocrine insufficiency. Correlations between low levels and chronic pancreatitis and cancer have been reported.
