= Pancreatic progenitor cell =

Type of stem cell

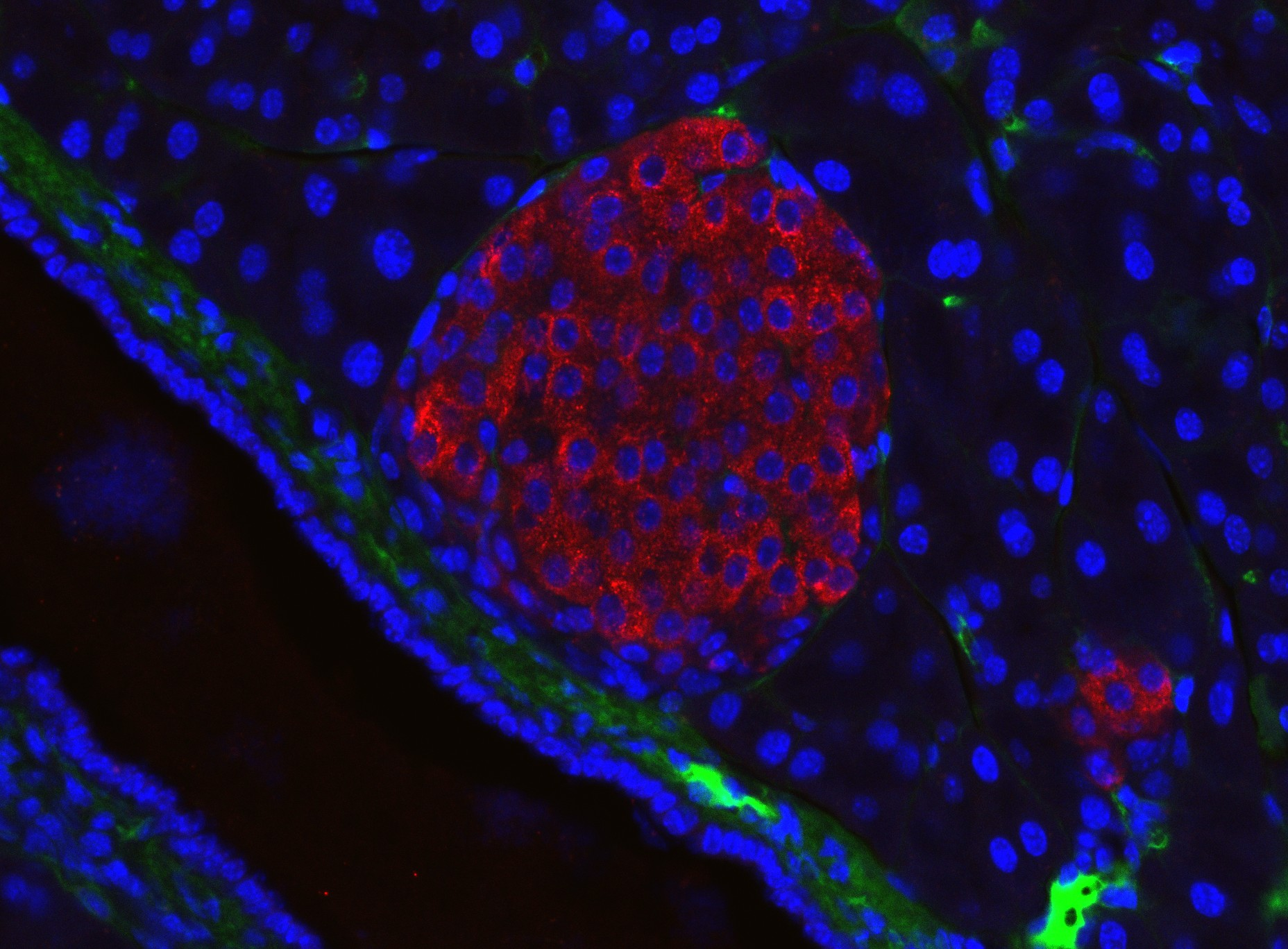
- Mouse pancreatic islets a potential region where Pancreatic progenitors reside

Details
- Precursor: Foregut endoderm

Identifiers
- Latin: Cellula pancreaticum praecursoria
- TH: H2.00.01.0.00005

Pancreatic progenitor cells are multipotent stem cells originating from the developing fore-gut endoderm which have the ability to differentiate into the lineage specific progenitors responsible for the developing pancreas.

They give rise to both the endocrine and exocrine cells. Exocrine cells constitute the acinar cells and the ductal cells. The endocrine cells constitute the beta cells which make insulin, alpha cells which secrete glucagon, delta cells which secrete somatostatin and the PP-cells which secrete pancreatic polypeptide.

Pancreatic progenitor cells have been shown to arise from cells originating from the developing foregut during mammalian development. It has been seen in the developing embryo at stages E9.0 to E9.5 that there are a cluster of cells which give rise to the pancreas. These clusters have been characterized to show multipotent properties.

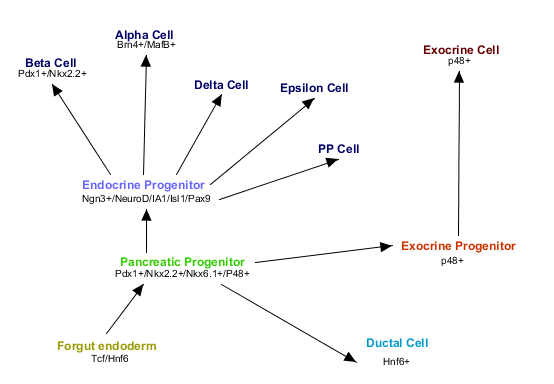
The development and differentiation of the pancreatic progenitor cell. Note the changing expression pattern of markers

== Development ==
The pancreas is an organ of endodermal origin. The endoderm is amongst the three germ layers that make up the developing embryo. The origination of the pancreatic tissue is from the dorsal and ventral aspects of the posterior foregut. They can be observed at E9.0 to E9.5 during embryonic development. Fusion of these buds occurs during rotation of the developing gut. The fused and developed pancreas consists of pancreatic enzyme secreting cells (exocrine cells), digestive enzyme transporting cells (ductal cells) and hormone producing cells (endocrine cells). These endocrine cells develop in discrete areas within the pancreas known as the islets.

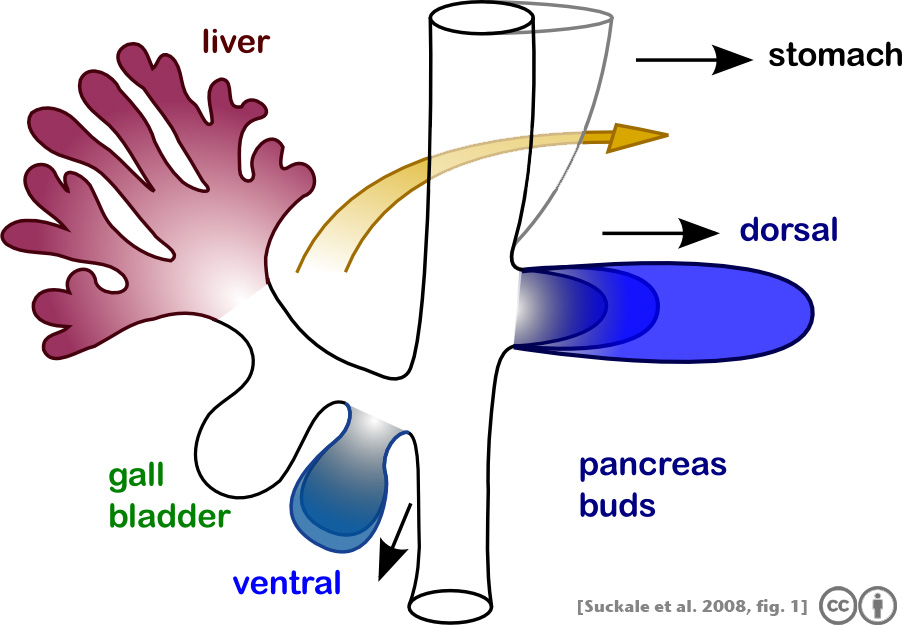
Schematic illustrating the development of the pancreas from a dorsal and a ventral bud. During maturation, the ventral bud flips to the other side of the gut tube (arrow) where it typically fuses with the dorsal lobe. An additional ventral lobe that usually regresses during development is omitted.

In humans, the dorsal bud can be observed 26 days post-fertilization. However, the islet cells can only be observed at 52 days post-fertilization. The development of beta cells precedes that of the development of other endocrine cells in the islets. All islet cells can be observed in the first trimester in human. This variation in the development of islet cell subtypes is due to differential gene expression and induction pathways of progenitor cells.

== Progenitors in the adult pancreas ==
In addition to the multipotent progenitors of the developing pancreas, the adult pancreas contains cells with progenitor-like properties that can contribute to the formation of new endocrine cells, particularly after injury. Studies in zebrafish using single-cell RNA sequencing have characterized ductal cell populations of the adult pancreas, including Notch-responsive ductal cells and a distinct population of krt4-expressing ductal cells that act as ductal progenitors of endocrine cells. Following the loss of beta cells, these ductal progenitors, together with subsets of endocrine cells, can give rise to new insulin-producing cells and contribute to beta-cell regeneration. Because pancreatic endocrine differentiation is broadly conserved across vertebrates, such progenitor populations are studied as models for generating beta cells in regenerative approaches to diabetes.

== Locations ==
Genetic lineage tracing experiments have been performed by various research groups to show that the cell clusters originating from the developing foregut express a transcription factor called PDX1 (Pancreatic and duodenal homeobox 1). This transcription factor has been shown to give rise to the multipotent stem cell lineages contributing to the endocrine, exocrine and ductal cells of the pancreas. These cells have been shown to be spatially located at the tip of the branching pancreatic tree. Later these cells are shown to originate from the dorsal bud of the developing pancreas.

Pdx1 is accepted as the earliest marker for pancreatic differentiation. Pdx1 has been shown to be a marker for all pancreatic and mid-gut progenitor cells. Pdx1 expression is empirical to drive the developing pancreas after the bud stage where two buds (dorsal and lateral) of the immature pancreas develop. Notch signaling has been shown to regulate the number of exocrine and endocrine cells in the pancreas, but not without the presence of Pdx1. Notch signaling allows the expansion of pancreatic progenitors by the process of lateral inhibition.

These cells have been shown to have 28 genes regulating the cell cycle to be upregulated, showing that they are proliferative cells having the ability to replace and give rise to multiple cell populations in the pancreas.

A time lapse video showing the role of cell cycle dependent dynamics in balancing endocrine differentiation

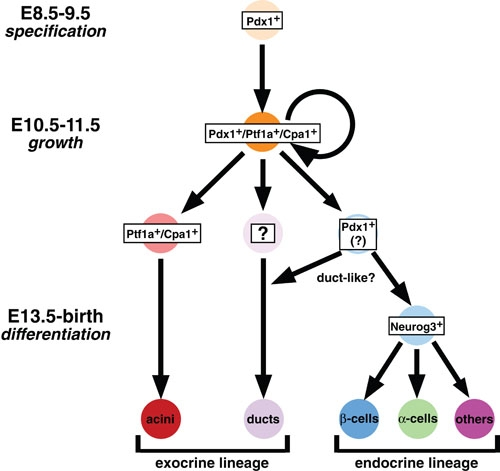
Pancreatic lineages in the mouse. Studies performed in mice have helped in the lineage tracing of progenitors.

== Regulation of specification ==
Pancreatic progenitors have been shown to arise from the early expression of the gene Mnx1/Hlxb1 (Motor Neuron and pancreas homeobox 1). Mnx1 expression has been shown to be important for the development of dorsal Pdx1, hence acting as a necessary transcription factor for the specification of foregut endoderm into Pdx1 expressing pancreatic progenitors. Similarly, another set of genes Gata4 (GATA binding protein 4) and Hnf1b/Tcf2 (HNF homobox B gene) is required for the development of the ventral bud of the developing pancreas. These genes regulates the expression of Mnx1 in the ventral bud, leading to the developmental specification of the pancreatic progenitor cells expressing Pdx1. One gene Onecut1/Hnf6 (onecut domain family member 1 transcription factor) is also responsible for the timely expression of Pdx1 in both the ventral and dorsal buds. Hence the expression of this protein also contributes to the formation of these pancreatic progenitors expressing Pdx1. The developing dorsal and ventral buds are characterized as endoderm, and it isn't until the expression of Pdx1 (specification of endoderm to a stem cell multipotent state) that the endoderm to pancreatic progenitor transition occurs.

The variable number of genes shows the multiple routes of induction of the developing endoderm, intrinsically within the endoderm (for example, notch signaling) or from the adjacent cardiac mesoderm (Sonic hedgehog protein inhibition by Fibroblast growth factor).

The differential of pancreatic progenitors from hepatic progenitors is also notable, as Hhex1 (Hematopoietically expressed homeobox gene) is responsible for the origination of pancreatic progenitor cells. In the absence of Hhex, (in Hhex double negative mice) the liver develops but not the pancreas, showing that Hhex allows for divergent specification of a pancreatic progenitor rather than allow the formation of a hepatic progenitor.

== Developing lineages ==
Pancreatic progenitor cells have the ability to differentiate into both endocrine and exocrine precursors.

=== Endocrine Lineage ===
The endocrine precursors are a committed group of progenitors that develop into all of the endocrine cells in the pancreas. Endocrine lineages develop into Delta cells, PP-cells, Epsilon cells, Beta cells and Alpha cells. Alpha cells produce glucagon and beta cells produce insulin. Insulin and glucagon antagonistically regulate the glucose homeostasis in the mammalian body. PP-cells produce pancreatic polypeptide which is a regulator of endocrine and exocrine secretions in the pancreas and gut. Delta cells which produce somatostatin which is a growth hormone inhibiting hormone and has important function in the regulation of hormone production from the anterior pituitary gland. Epsilon cells produce Ghrelin (hunger hormone) which is a neuropeptide that acts on the hypothalamic center of the brain, where it couples with GHSR (growth hormone secretagogue receptors) and mediates hunger.

=== Exocrine Lineage ===
The exocrine progenitor cell develop into precursor cells expressing amylase. These cells then can be identified in tissue to be secretory in nature and contribute to the production of pancreatic enzymes.

=== Ductal lineage ===
The ductal progenitors are a group of precursors that develop into ductal cells in the pancreas. These cells line the ducts and also originate from pancreatic progenitors.

== Markers ==
The endodermal progenitors are shown to express Hnf6 and Hnf1b, hence are Hnf6+/Hnf1b+ cells. Due to the suppression of Sonic hedgehog signaling, pancreatic progenitor cells develop and give rise to multiple cell lineages. Pancreatic progenitor cells are Nkx2.2+/Nkx6.1+/P48+ cells.

=== Endocrine Cells ===
Endocrine progenitor cells develop from Pancreatic Progenitor cells under the influence of Ngn3 (neurogenin 3). This cell fate commitment is due to the expression of Sox9 (Sry-related HMB box transcription factor 9) and suppression of Notch signaling. Pancreatic Progenitor cells are hence Ngn3+/NeuroD+/IA1+/Isl1+/Pax6+ cells. These cells then develop into Beta cell pro-precursors under the influence of Pax4. Beta cell pro-precursors are MafB+/Pdx1+/Nkx2.2+ cells. These beta cell pro-precursors are determined to form beta cell precursors expressing Pax1. Finally, beta-cell precursors mature into mature adult beta cells which are Pdx1+/Nkx2.2+/Nkx6.1+/Pax6+/NeuroD+/MafA+.

Endocrine progenitor cells also develop into delta cell pro-precursors expressing Pax4 and Pax6. They then form Som+ delta cell precursor cells. These delta cell precursors mature into delta cells which are Brn+/Pax6+.

Additionally endocrine progenitor cells also form Nkx2.2+ PP cell pro-precursors, which then are determined to form PP+ (Pancreatic polypeptide) precursor cells and later PP-cells. Endocrine progenitors are also responsible for forming epsilon cells.

=== Exocrine Cells ===
These progenitor cells develop from pancreatic progenitor cells and are P48+ cells. These cells develop into amylase+/P48+ mature exocrine cells.

=== Ductal Cell ===
These cells express Hnf6 and originate from pancreatic progenitor cells. They are peculiar as their morphology and characteristics is similar to that of the pancreatic progenitor cell. Ductal cell precursors express Hnf6 before developing into the mature ductal cell of the pancreas.

== Pancreatic regeneration ==
The regenerative potential of the adult pancreas has been a pivotal point for debate. Many research groups including prominent research scientists in the field have been unable to decide the true presence or absence of these cells and their function in pancreatic regeneration as their name would suggest. This is due to the fact that their regenerative potential in an experimental setting is lost. However new studies show that growth factors of the TGF-beta superfamily may be involved in regeneration of pancreatic cells. Pancreatic mesenchymal stem cells isolated from ductal digests have also been shown to have a regenerative potential under the effect of certain growth factors. They have also been shown to give rise to cells of at least two different germ layers. However this may be misinterpreted as an endocrine precursor rather than a pancreatic progenitor cell. This is due to a study performed by Zulweski and co-workers, who showed the presence of neural stem cell specific markers in the pancreatic duct of rats. However these cells did not show staining for CK19 (cytokeratin 19) a ductal cell marker.

== Research ==
=== Programming progenitor cells ===
The development of a protocol involving the directed generation of pancreatic progenitors has been performed on hESCs (human embryonic stem cells). These cells showing immense potential in therapy for metabolic diseases of the pancreas like diabetes, have been programmed to pancreatic progenitors using factors mimicking the developmental cues a developing endoderm would require to form functional pancreatic tissue. hESCs have are grown on matrigel and then allowed to differentiate into endoderm and later defined cells under the influence of bFGF, EGF, BMP4.

== See also ==
- Pancreas
- Progenitor cells
- Diabetes
- Stem cell therapy
- List of human cell types derived from the germ layers
