= Pancreatic elastase II =

Identifiers
- EC no.: 3.4.21.71
- CAS no.: 75603-19-9

Databases
- BRENDA: enzyme data
- ExPASy: NiceZyme view
- KEGG: enzyme entry
- MetaCyc: metabolic pathway
- Rhea: reactions
- PDB structures: RCSB PDB PDBe PDBsum
Search
- PMC: articles
- PubMed: articles
- NCBI: proteins

Pancreatic elastase II (EC 3.4.21.71, pancreatic elastase 2) is an enzyme which in humans can encoded by the CELA2A or CELA2B genes. This enzyme catalyses the following chemical reaction

Preferential cleavage: Leu-, Met- and Phe-. Hydrolyses elastin

This peptidase is from the trypsin family. It is produced by the acinar cells of the pancreas in an inactive form called proelastase II which is subsequently activated by trypsin in the small intestines.
