= RBPJL =

Protein-coding gene found in humans

Identifiers
- Aliases: RBPJL, RBPSUHL, SUHL, RBPL, recombination signal binding protein for immunoglobulin kappa J region like
- External IDs: OMIM: 616104; MGI: 1196616; GeneCards: RBPJL
Available structures
PDB	Ortholog search: PDBe RCSB
PDB	List of PDB id codes 2F8X, 3NBN, 3V79

Gene location (Human)
Chr.	Chromosome 20 (human)
Band	20q13.12	Start	45,306,840 bp
Band	20q13.12	End	45,317,824 bp

Gene location (Mouse)
Chr.	Chromosome 2 (mouse)
Band	2 H3|2 85.16 cM	Start	164,245,061 bp
Band	2 H3|2 85.16 cM	End	164,257,368 bp
RNA expression pattern
Bgee	Human / Mouse (ortholog); Top expressed in: body of pancreas; testicle; gonad; body of stomach; fundus; islet of Langerhans; right lobe of liver; duodenum; cervix; bone marrow cell / Top expressed in: male urethra; pancreas; left lung lobe; right lung; stomach; entorhinal cortex; Ileal epithelium; right lung lobe; islet of Langerhans; morula; More reference expression data
BioGPS	n/a
Gene ontology
Molecular function	DNA-binding transcription factor activity; RNA polymerase II cis-regulatory region sequence-specific DNA binding; DNA binding; transcription factor activity, RNA polymerase II core promoter proximal region sequence-specific binding; chromatin binding; RNA polymerase II transcription regulatory region sequence-specific DNA binding; DNA-binding transcription activator activity, RNA polymerase II-specific; DNA-binding transcription factor activity, RNA polymerase II-specific; sequence-specific DNA binding
Cellular component	nucleus; transcription regulator complex
Biological process	positive regulation of transcription, DNA-templated; regulation of transcription, DNA-templated; transcription, DNA-templated; signal transduction; positive regulation of transcription by RNA polymerase II; transcription by RNA polymerase II; regulation of transcription by RNA polymerase II
Sources:Amigo / QuickGO
Orthologs
Databases	NCBI: entry; OMA: entry
Species	Human	Mouse
Entrez	11317	19668
Ensembl	ENSG00000124232	ENSMUSG00000017007
UniProt	Q9UBG7	O08674
RefSeq (mRNA)	NM_001281448; NM_001281449; NM_014276	NM_009036
RefSeq (protein)	NP_001268377; NP_001268378; NP_055091	NP_033062
Location (UCSC)	Chr 20: 45.31 – 45.32 Mb	Chr 2: 164.25 – 164.26 Mb
PubMed search
- Wikidata
View/Edit Human	View/Edit Mouse

Recombining binding protein suppressor of hairless-like protein is a protein that in humans is encoded by the RBPJL gene. This protein is highly expressed in the pancreas (especially acinar cells), and is involved in its development.

In research in mice, similar to its paralog, RBPJ, RBPJL forms a complex with PTF1A. Early on, RBPJ is the main protein of the two involved in the PTF1A complex, which preserves the progenitor state of the cells of the pancreas. However, as the pancreas gradually develops, RBPJL replaces it in this complex.
