= Pancreatic endopeptidase E =

Identifiers
- EC no.: 3.4.21.70
- CAS no.: 68073-27-8

Databases
- BRENDA: enzyme data
- ExPASy: NiceZyme view
- KEGG: enzyme entry
- MetaCyc: metabolic pathway
- Rhea: reactions
- PDB structures: RCSB PDB PDBe PDBsum
Search
- PMC: articles
- PubMed: articles
- NCBI: proteins

Pancreatic endopeptidase E (EC 3.4.21.70) is an enzyme that in humans is encoded by the CELA3A and CELA3B genes.

This enzyme is type of peptidase, which means it catalyses the breaking of peptide bonds between amino acids in proteins. In particular, this enzyme preferentially cleaves bonds of the amino acid alanine (Ala┼). Despite formerly being called Elastase III, it does not break elastin bonds, unlike the related enzyme pancreatic elastase II. This enzyme is a peptidase of family S1 (trypsin family). The two human isozymes are primarily expressed in the acinar cells of the pancreas.

== Other names ==
This enzyme has many synonyms. These include: cholesterol-binding proteinase, proteinase E, cholesterol-binding serine proteinase, pancreatic protease E, pancreatic proteinase E, cholesterol-binding pancreatic proteinase, CBPP, and pancreas E proteinase.
