= Elastase =

Enzyme

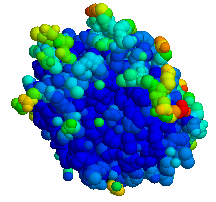
Space-filling model of elastase

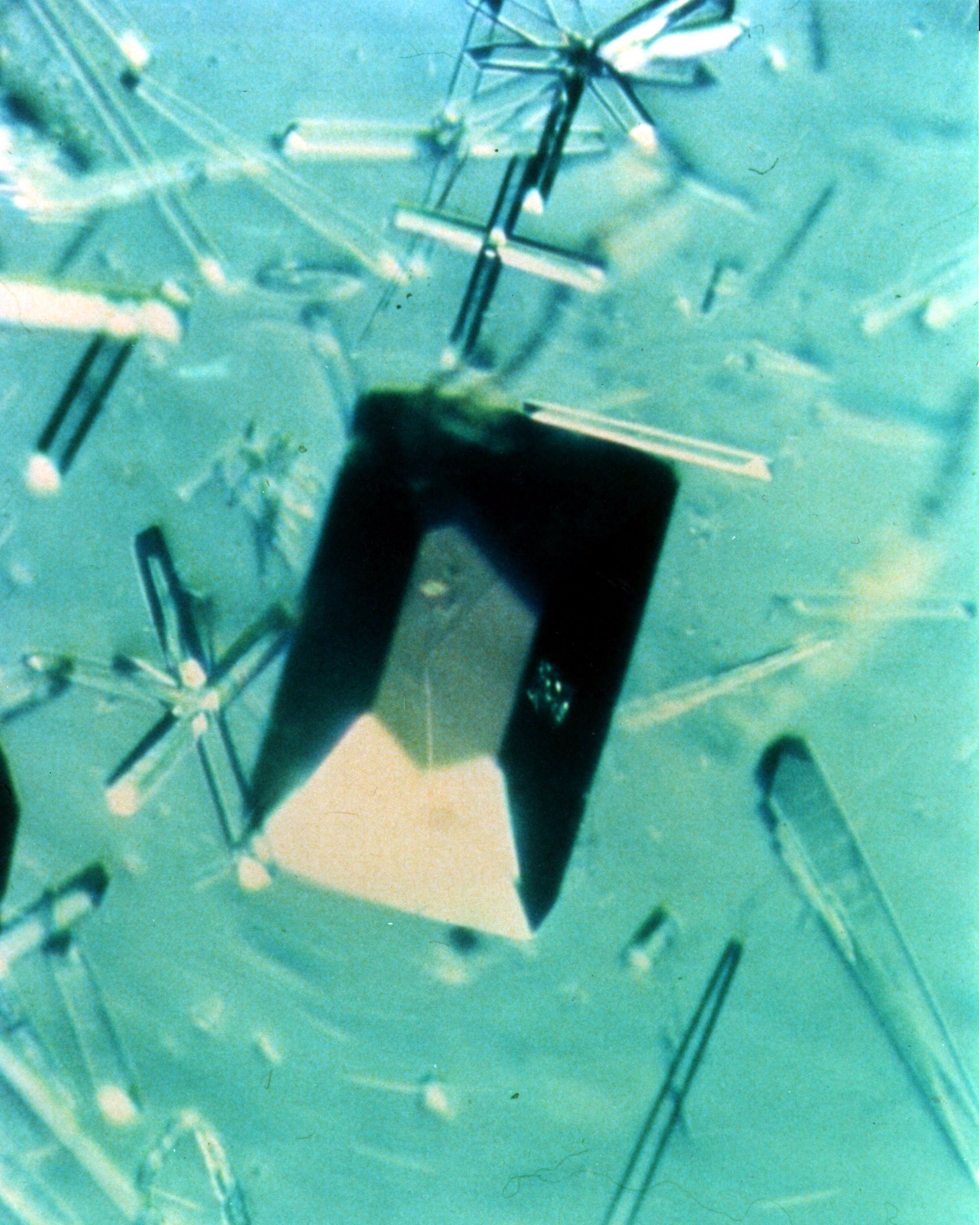
Crystals of porcine elastase

In molecular biology, elastase is an enzyme from the class of proteases (peptidases) that break down proteins, specifically one that can break down elastin. In other words, the name generally refers to the substrate specificity (i.e. what proteins it can digest), not to any kind of evolutionary grouping. However, this definition is not always used consistently, and some related proteases like CELA3A and CELA3B, which mostly do not have the ability to break down elastin, have historically been called elastases.

== Forms and classification ==
Eight human genes encode elastases or are part of the classical elastase family

Family	Gene symbol		Protein name		EC number
Family	Approved	Previous	Approved	Previous	EC number
chymotrypsin- like	CELA1	ELA1	chymotrypsin-like elastase family, member 1	elastase 1, pancreatic (misleading)	EC 3.4.21.36
chymotrypsin- like	CELA2A	ELA2A	chymotrypsin-like elastase family, member 2A	elastase 2A, pancreatic	EC 3.4.21.71
chymotrypsin- like	CELA2B	ELA2B	chymotrypsin-like elastase family, member 2B	elastase 2B, pancreatic	EC 3.4.21.71
chymotrypsin- like	CELA3A*	ELA3A	chymotrypsin-like elastase family, member 3A	elastase 3A, pancreatic	EC 3.4.21.70
chymotrypsin- like	CELA3B*	ELA3B	chymotrypsin-like elastase family, member 3B	elastase 3B, pancreatic	EC 3.4.21.70
chymotrypsin	CTRC	ELA4	chymotrypsin C (caldecrin)	elastase 4	EC 3.4.21.2
neutrophil	ELANE	ELA2	neutrophil elastase	elastase 2	EC 3.4.21.37
macrophage	MMP12	HME	macrophage metalloelastase	macrophage elastase	EC 3.4.24.65

(*) Though CELA3A/CELA3B are often referred to as elastases, they have little to no ability to actually break down elastin, and are instead sometimes referred to as "pancreatic endopeptidase E".

The five chymotrypsin-like elastases, chymotrypsin-C, and neutrophil elastase are all serine proteases. The "macrophage elastase" is a matrix metallopeptidase.

Chymotrypsin-C is less able breaking down elastin than pancreatic elastases like CELA2A and CELA2B.

Some bacteria (including Pseudomonas aeruginosa) also produce elastase; bacterial elastases work in many ways and include serine proteases, aspartic proteases, thiol proteases, and metalloenzymes.

== Function ==
While elastases can all break down elastin in test tubes (while other proteases cannot), there is not necessarily a unifying function for all elastases in the living body. Instead, they each have their own role:

- The chymotrypsin-like elastases CELA2A/2B/3A/3C and chymotrypsin-C are responsible for digesting proteins in food.
- Despite its original name, "pancreatic elastase 1" (CELA1) is expressed in skin keratinocytes, and not the pancreas.
- Neutrophil elastase breaks down the Outer membrane protein A (OmpA) of E. coli and other Gram-negative bacteria, killing the bacterium carrying the protein. It also very effectively breaks down Shigella virulence factors.
- In bacteria, secreted elastase breaks down host connective tissue proteins, causing tissue damage and inflammation. As a result, it's considered a virulence factor.

Elastases of the serine protease type preferentially break down peptide bonds on the carboxyl side of small, hydrophobic amino acids such as glycine, alanine, and valine.

== Role of human elastase in disease ==
=== A1AT ===
Elastase is inhibited by the acute-phase protein α_{1}-antitrypsin (A1AT), which binds almost irreversibly to the active site of elastase and trypsin. A1AT is normally secreted by the liver cells into the serum. Alpha-1 antitrypsin deficiency (A1AD) leads to uninhibited destruction of elastic fibre by elastase; the main result is emphysema.

=== Cyclic neutropenia ===
The rare disease cyclic neutropenia (also called "cyclic hematopoeiesis") is an autosomal dominant genetic disorder characterised by fluctuating neutrophil granulocyte counts over 21-day periods. During neutropenia, patients are at risk for infections. In 1999, this disease was linked to disorders in the ELA-2 / ELANE gene. Other forms of congenital neutropenia also appear to be linked to ELA-2 mutations.

=== Other diseases ===
Neutrophil elastase is responsible for the blistering in bullous pemphigoid, a skin condition, in the presence of antibodies. It may also play a role in the formation of abdominal aortic aneurysms (AAAs) and chronic obstructive pulmonary disease (COPD).

== Role of bacterial elastase in disease ==
Elastase has been shown to disrupt tight junctions, cause proteolytic damage to tissue, break down cytokines and alpha proteinase inhibitor, cleave immunoglobulin A and G (IgA, IgG), and cleave both C3bi, a component of the complement system, and CR1, a receptor on neutrophils for another complement molecule involved in phagocytosis. The cleavage of IgA, IgG, C3bi, and CR1 contributes to a decrease of the ability of neutrophils to kill bacteria by phagocytosis. Together, all these factors contribute to human pathology.
