= PLA2G1B =

Protein-coding gene in the species Homo sapiens

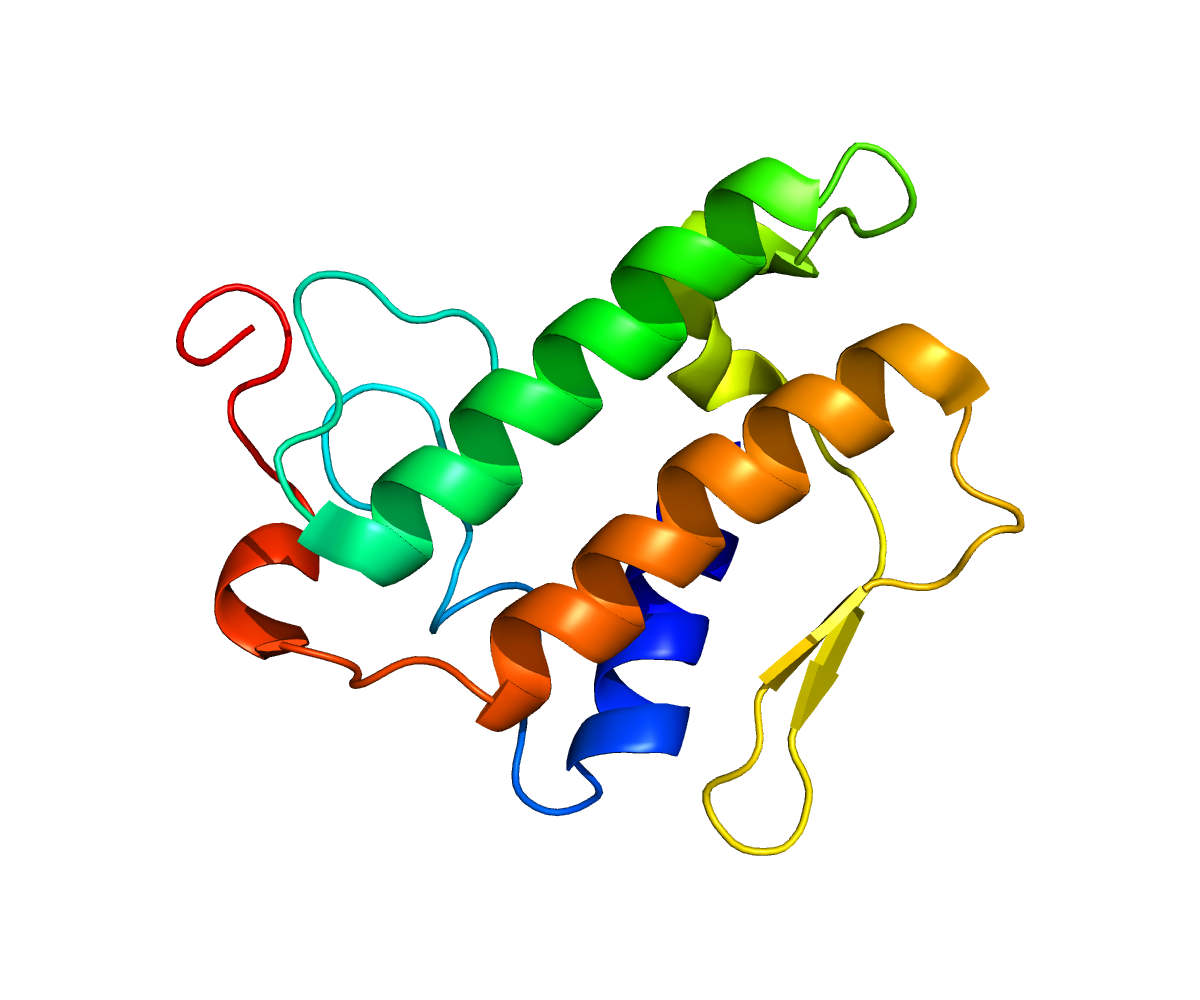

Identifiers
- Aliases: PLA2G1B, PLA2, PLA2A, PPLA2, phospholipase A2 group IB
- External IDs: OMIM: 172410; MGI: 101842; GeneCards: PLA2G1B
Available structures
PDB	Ortholog search: PDBe RCSB
PDB	List of PDB id codes 3ELO
Enzyme activity
EC #	BRENDA	ExPASy	KEGG	MetaCyc
3.1.1.4	↗	↗	↗	↗

Gene location (Human)
Chr.	Chromosome 12 (human)
Band	12q24.31	Start	120,322,115 bp
Band	12q24.31	End	120,327,779 bp

Gene location (Mouse)
Chr.	Chromosome 5 (mouse)
Band	5|5 F	Start	115,604,321 bp
Band	5|5 F	End	115,612,781 bp
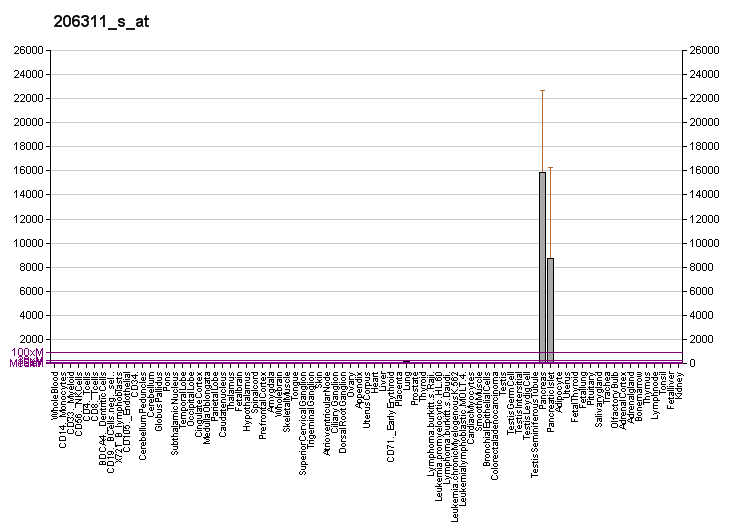
RNA expression pattern
Bgee	Human / Mouse (ortholog); Top expressed in: body of pancreas; islet of Langerhans; beta cell; lower lobe of lung; sperm; testicle; upper lobe of lung; right lung; upper lobe of left lung; left ovary / Top expressed in: epithelium of stomach; pyloric antrum; mucous cell of stomach; islet of Langerhans; embryo; duodenum; embryo; esophagus; right lung; left lung; More reference expression data
BioGPS	More reference expression data
Gene ontology
Molecular function	calcium ion binding; calcium-dependent phospholipase A2 activity; metal ion binding; bile acid binding; signaling receptor binding; hydrolase activity; phospholipase A2 activity; phospholipid binding
Cellular component	secretory granule; extracellular region; cell surface; extracellular space; cytosol
Biological process	phosphatidic acid biosynthetic process; phosphatidylserine acyl-chain remodeling; intracellular signal transduction; phosphatidylethanolamine acyl-chain remodeling; positive regulation of calcium ion transport into cytosol; lipid metabolism; actin filament organization; interleukin-8 production; phosphatidylinositol acyl-chain remodeling; activation of phospholipase A2 activity; neutrophil chemotaxis; fatty acid biosynthetic process; positive regulation of immune response; innate immune response in mucosa; positive regulation of NF-kappaB transcription factor activity; phosphatidylglycerol acyl-chain remodeling; positive regulation of protein secretion; cellular response to insulin stimulus; neutrophil mediated immunity; leukotriene biosynthetic process; phosphatidylcholine metabolic process; phosphatidylcholine acyl-chain remodeling; positive regulation of transcription by RNA polymerase II; signal transduction; phospholipid metabolic process; arachidonic acid secretion; antimicrobial humoral immune response mediated by antimicrobial peptide; regulation of glucose import; positive regulation of cell population proliferation; lipid catabolic process; positive regulation of fibroblast proliferation; antibacterial humoral response; defense response to Gram-positive bacterium
Sources:Amigo / QuickGO
Orthologs
Databases	NCBI: entry; OMA: entry
Species	Human	Mouse
Entrez	5319	18778
Ensembl	ENSG00000170890	ENSMUSG00000029522
UniProt	P04054	Q9Z0Y2
RefSeq (mRNA)	NM_000928	NM_011107; NM_001356586; NM_001356587
RefSeq (protein)	NP_000919	NP_035237; NP_001343515; NP_001343516
Location (UCSC)	Chr 12: 120.32 – 120.33 Mb	Chr 5: 115.6 – 115.61 Mb
PubMed search
- Wikidata
View/Edit Human	View/Edit Mouse

Phospholipase A_{2}, group 1B is an enzyme that in humans is encoded by the PLA2G1B gene. This protein functions as a digestive enzyme which is secreted by the acinar cells of the pancreas into the small intestines. In the intestines, it helps break down dietary phospholipids.

== Function ==
Phospholipase A_{2} (EC 3.1.1.4) catalyzes the release of fatty acids from glycero-3-phosphocholines. The best known varieties are the digestive enzymes secreted as zymogens by the pancreas of mammals as well as fish. Sequences of pancreatic PLA_{2} enzymes from a variety of mammals have been reported. One striking feature of these enzymes is their close homology to venom phospholipases of snakes. Other forms of PLA_{2} have been isolated from brain, liver, lung, spleen, intestine, macrophages, leukocytes, erythrocytes, inflammatory exudates, chondrocytes, and platelets.
