= CELA3A =

Protein-coding gene in humans

Identifiers
- Aliases: CELA3A, ELA3, ELA3A, chymotrypsin like elastase family member 3A, chymotrypsin like elastase 3A
- External IDs: MGI: 3651647; GeneCards: CELA3A
Enzyme activity
EC #	BRENDA	ExPASy	KEGG	MetaCyc
3.4.21.70	↗	↗	↗	↗

Gene location (Human)
Chr.	Chromosome 1 (human)
Band	1p36.12	Start	22,001,657 bp
Band	1p36.12	End	22,012,542 bp

Gene location (Mouse)
Chr.	Chromosome 4 (mouse)
Band	4|4 D3	Start	137,128,865 bp
Band	4|4 D3	End	137,137,102 bp
RNA expression pattern
Bgee	Human / Mouse (ortholog); Top expressed in: body of pancreas; islet of Langerhans; duodenum; body of stomach; fundus; right coronary artery; ectocervix; right uterine tube; canal of the cervix; right adrenal gland / Top expressed in: islet of Langerhans; colon; stomach; nervous system; brain; human kidney; More reference expression data
BioGPS	n/a
Gene ontology
Molecular function	peptidase activity; serine-type peptidase activity; hydrolase activity; serine-type endopeptidase activity
Cellular component	extracellular space
Biological process	proteolysis
Sources:Amigo / QuickGO
Orthologs
Databases	NCBI: entry; OMA: entry
Species	Human	Mouse
Entrez	10136	242711
Ensembl	ENSG00000142789	ENSMUSG00000078520
UniProt	P09093	A2A9U8
RefSeq (mRNA)	NM_005747	NM_001126318
RefSeq (protein)	NP_005738	NP_001119790
Location (UCSC)	Chr 1: 22 – 22.01 Mb	Chr 4: 137.13 – 137.14 Mb
PubMed search
- Wikidata
View/Edit Human	View/Edit Mouse

Chymotrypsin-like elastase family member 3A is an enzyme that in humans is encoded by the CELA3A gene. CELA3A is a digestive enzyme found in pancreatic juice, which functions to break protein bonds. Like its paralog CELA3B, it is a pancreatic endopeptidase E. Despite sometimes being referred to as an elastase, it has little ability to break down elastin, but it is able to bind cholesterol, and may be involved in cholesterol metabolism.

== Function ==
Elastases form a subfamily of serine proteases that hydrolyze many proteins in addition to elastin. Humans have six elastase family genes which encode the structurally similar proteins elastase 1, 2, 2A, 2B, 3A, and 3B. Like most of the human elastases, elastase 3A is secreted from the acinar cells of the pancreas as an inactive zymogen and, like other serine proteases such as trypsin, chymotrypsin and kallikrein, it has a digestive function in the intestine. Elastase 3A preferentially cleaves proteins after alanine residues. Elastase 3A may also function in the intestinal transport and metabolism of cholesterol. Both elastase 3A and elastase 3B have been referred to as protease E and as elastase 1.
