= Pancreatic juice =

Liquid secreted by the pancreas

Identifiers
- MeSH: D010189
- FMA: 62973

Pancreatic juice is a liquid secreted by the pancreas, which contains a number of digestive enzymes, including trypsinogen, chymotrypsinogen, elastase, carboxypeptidase, pancreatic lipase, nucleases, and amylase. The pancreas is located in the visceral region, and is a major part of the digestive system required for proper digestion and subsequent assimilation of macronutrient substances required for living.

Pancreatic juice is alkaline in nature due to the high concentration of bicarbonate ions. Bicarbonate is useful in neutralizing the acidic gastric acid, allowing for effective enzymic changes.

Pancreatic juice secretion is principally regulated by the hormones secretin and cholecystokinin, which are produced by the walls of the duodenum, and by the action of autonomic innervation.

The release of these hormones into the blood is stimulated by the entry of the acidic chyme into the duodenum. Their coordinated action results in the secretion of a large volume of pancreatic juice, which is alkaline and enzyme-rich, into the duodenum. The pancreas also receives autonomic innervation. The blood flow into pancreas is regulated by sympathetic nerve fibers, while parasympathetic neurons stimulate the activity of acinar and centroacinar cells.

Pancreatic secretion is an aqueous solution of bicarbonate originating from the duct cells and enzymes originating from the acinar cells. The bicarbonate assists in neutralising the low pH of the chyme coming from the stomach, while the enzymes assist in the breakdown of the proteins, lipids and carbohydrates for further processing and absorption in the intestines. Secretin-stimulated pancreatic juice can be collected during endoscopy and provides an important source for diagnostic biomarkers, allowing detection of pancreatic pathology, especially cancer not yet visible on medical imaging..

Pancreatic juice is secreted into the duodenum through duodenal papillae. Some individuals have also an accessory duct, named accessory pancreatic duct, which may be functional (that is, it also empties the contents of the exocrine pancreas into the duodenum) or non-functional.
