= NKX6-1 =

Protein-coding gene in humans

Identifiers
- Aliases: NKX6-1, NKX6.1, NKX6A, NK6 homeobox 1
- External IDs: OMIM: 602563; MGI: 1206039; GeneCards: NKX6-1

Gene location (Human)
Chr.	Chromosome 4 (human)
Band	4q21.23	Start	84,491,985 bp
Band	4q21.23	End	84,499,292 bp

Gene location (Mouse)
Chr.	Chromosome 5 (mouse)
Band	5|5 E4- E5	Start	101,806,005 bp
Band	5|5 E4- E5	End	101,812,862 bp
RNA expression pattern
Bgee	Human / Mouse (ortholog); Top expressed in: gastric mucosa; islet of Langerhans; testicle; body of pancreas; stromal cell of endometrium; left lobe of thyroid gland; substantia nigra; left testis; hypothalamus; right testis / Top expressed in: islet of Langerhans; primordial pancreas; stria vascularis; embryo; facial motor nucleus; esophagus; spinal cord; anterior horn of spinal cord; vestibular membrane of cochlear duct; cochlea; More reference expression data
BioGPS	n/a
Gene ontology
Molecular function	DNA-binding transcription repressor activity, RNA polymerase II-specific; sequence-specific DNA binding; RNA polymerase II cis-regulatory region sequence-specific DNA binding; chromatin binding; DNA-binding transcription factor activity; DNA binding; DNA-binding transcription factor activity, RNA polymerase II-specific
Cellular component	nucleus; extracellular exosome
Biological process	smoothened signaling pathway; detection of glucose; pancreas development; transcription, DNA-templated; regulation of axon extension; multicellular organism development; cellular response to peptide hormone stimulus; central nervous system neuron differentiation; response to nicotine; negative regulation of glial cell differentiation; type B pancreatic cell proliferation; cellular response to cytokine stimulus; positive regulation of DNA-binding transcription factor activity; neurogenesis; regulation of transcription by RNA polymerase II; type B pancreatic cell development; positive regulation of neuron differentiation; negative regulation of transcription by RNA polymerase II; positive regulation of type B pancreatic cell development; type B pancreatic cell maturation; oligodendrocyte differentiation; regulation of transcription, DNA-templated; cell population proliferation; positive regulation of transcription by RNA polymerase II; transcription by RNA polymerase II; positive regulation of glial cell differentiation; cell differentiation; positive regulation of insulin secretion; animal organ morphogenesis; regulation of neuron migration; neuron migration; regulation of insulin secretion; endocrine pancreas development; type B pancreatic cell differentiation
Sources:Amigo / QuickGO
Orthologs
Databases	NCBI: entry; OMA: entry
Species	Human	Mouse
Entrez	4825	18096
Ensembl	ENSG00000163623	ENSMUSG00000035187
UniProt	P78426	Q99MA9
RefSeq (mRNA)	NM_006168	NM_144955
RefSeq (protein)	NP_006159	NP_659204
Location (UCSC)	Chr 4: 84.49 – 84.5 Mb	Chr 5: 101.81 – 101.81 Mb
PubMed search
- Wikidata
View/Edit Human	View/Edit Mouse

Homeobox protein Nkx-6.1 is a protein that in humans is encoded by the NKX6-1 gene.

== Function ==
In the pancreas, NKX6.1 is required for the development of beta cells. It is a potent bifunctional transcription regulator that binds to AT-rich sequences within the promoter region of target genes.
