= CUZD1 =

Protein-coding gene in humans

Identifiers
- Aliases: CUZD1, ERG-1, UO-44, ERG1, ITMAP1, CUB and zona pellucida like domains 1
- External IDs: OMIM: 616644; MGI: 1202881; HomoloGene: 7389; GeneCards: CUZD1; OMA:CUZD1 - orthologs

Gene location (Human)
Chr.	Chromosome 10 (human)
Band	10q26.13	Start	122,832,158 bp
Band	10q26.13	End	122,846,175 bp

Gene location (Mouse)
Chr.	Chromosome 7 (mouse)
Band	7|7 F3	Start	130,910,283 bp
Band	7|7 F3	End	130,924,021 bp
RNA expression pattern
Bgee	Human / Mouse (ortholog); Top expressed in: body of pancreas; islet of Langerhans; gonad; testicle; granulocyte; stromal cell of endometrium; mucosa of transverse colon; spleen; cerebellar hemisphere; right hemisphere of cerebellum / Top expressed in: pyloric antrum; islet of Langerhans; embryo; muscle of thigh; embryo; embryo; duodenum; triceps brachii muscle; knee joint; skeletal muscle tissue; More reference expression data
BioGPS	n/a
Orthologs
Species	Human	Mouse
Entrez	50624	16433
Ensembl	ENSG00000138161	ENSMUSG00000040205
UniProt	Q86UP6	P70412
RefSeq (mRNA)	NM_022034	NM_008411
RefSeq (protein)	NP_071317	NP_032437
Location (UCSC)	Chr 10: 122.83 – 122.85 Mb	Chr 7: 130.91 – 130.92 Mb
PubMed search
- Wikidata
View/Edit Human	View/Edit Mouse

CUB and zona pellucida-like domain-containing protein 1 is a protein that in humans is encoded by the CUZD1 gene.
