= Class A basic helix-loop-helix protein 15 =

Protein found in humans

BHLHA15

Identifiers
- Aliases: BHLHA15, BHLHB8, MIST1, basic helix-loop-helix family member a15
- External IDs: OMIM: 608606; MGI: 891976; GeneCards: BHLHA15

Gene location (Human)
Chr.	Chromosome 7 (human)
Band	7q21.3	Start	98,211,439 bp
Band	7q21.3	End	98,215,457 bp

Gene location (Mouse)
Chr.	Chromosome 5 (mouse)
Band	5|5 G2	Start	144,127,104 bp
Band	5|5 G2	End	144,131,259 bp
RNA expression pattern
Bgee	Human / Mouse (ortholog); Top expressed in: parotid gland; body of pancreas; bone marrow cell; body of stomach; testicle; olfactory zone of nasal mucosa; trachea; prostate; minor salivary glands; cardia / Top expressed in: submandibular gland; lacrimal gland; parotid gland; seminal vesicula; pancreas; crypt of lieberkuhn of small intestine; Paneth cell; epithelium of stomach; islet of Langerhans; pyloric antrum; More reference expression data
BioGPS	n/a
Gene ontology
Molecular function	DNA-binding transcription activator activity, RNA polymerase II-specific; DNA binding; RNA polymerase II transcription regulatory region sequence-specific DNA binding; protein homodimerization activity; protein dimerization activity; DNA-binding transcription factor activity, RNA polymerase II-specific
Cellular component	nucleus
Biological process	endoplasmic reticulum unfolded protein response; cell-cell signaling; G protein-coupled receptor signaling pathway; cellular response to glucose starvation; intracellular distribution of mitochondria; regulation of transcription, DNA-templated; cell maturation; transcription by RNA polymerase II; mitochondrial calcium ion transmembrane transport; Golgi organization; glucose homeostasis; transcription, DNA-templated; negative regulation of myotube differentiation; calcium-mediated signaling; positive regulation of transcription by RNA polymerase II
Sources:Amigo / QuickGO
Orthologs
Databases	NCBI: entry; OMA: entry
Species	Human	Mouse
Entrez	168620	17341
Ensembl	ENSG00000180535	ENSMUSG00000052271
UniProt	Q7RTS1	Q9QYC3
RefSeq (mRNA)	NM_177455	NM_010800
RefSeq (protein)	NP_803238	NP_034930
Location (UCSC)	Chr 7: 98.21 – 98.22 Mb	Chr 5: 144.13 – 144.13 Mb
PubMed search
- Wikidata
View/Edit Human	View/Edit Mouse

Class A basic helix-loop-helix protein 15 (bHLHa15) also known as class B basic helix-loop-helix protein 8 (bHLHb8) or muscle, intestine and stomach expression 1 (MIST-1) is a protein that in humans is encoded by the BHLHA15 gene.

== Function ==
bHLHa15 is required developmentally for the proper organization of all protein secreting, serous exocrine glands. In the absence of Mist1, exocrine tissue shows improper organization of organelles, especially the localization of the zymogen granules. The zymogen granules are the vesicles that store enzymes near the plasma membrane for easy release when stimulated. This disorganization caused by the loss of Mist1 leads to increased susceptibility toward pancreatic damage and potentially pancreatic cancer.
