= REG3G =

Antimicrobial peptides secreted by intestinal immune and epithelial cells

Identifiers
- Aliases: REG3G, LPPM429, PAP IB, PAP-1B, PAP1B, PAPIB, REG III, REG-III, UNQ429, regenerating family member 3 gamma
- External IDs: OMIM: 609933; MGI: 109406; GeneCards: REG3G

Gene location (Human)
| Chr. | Chromosome 2 (human) |
| Band | 2p12 | Start | 79,025,686 bp |
| Band | 2p12 | End | 79,028,505 bp |

Gene location (Mouse)
| Chr. | Chromosome 6 (mouse) |
| Band | 6|6 C3 | Start | 78,443,252 bp |
| Band | 6|6 C3 | End | 78,445,855 bp |
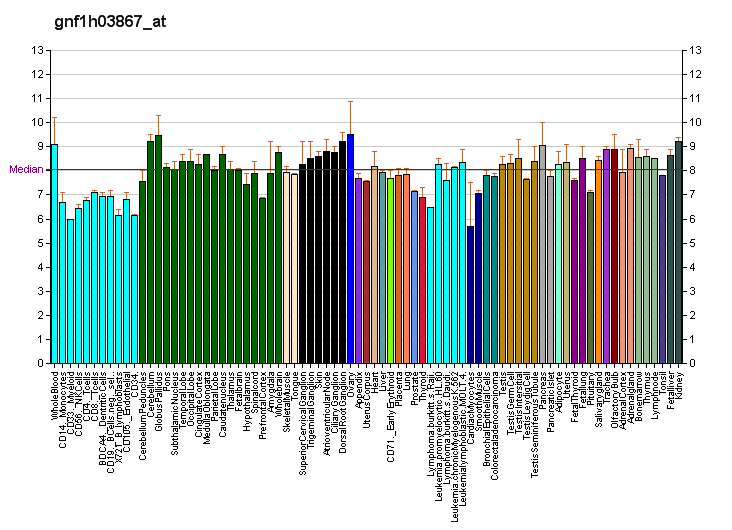
RNA expression pattern
| Bgee | Human / Mouse (ortholog); Top expressed in: body of pancreas; islet of Langerhans; right testis; left testis; right adrenal gland; right adrenal cortex; left adrenal gland; left adrenal cortex; pancreatic ductal cell; mucosa of ileum / Top expressed in: crypt of lieberkuhn of small intestine; respiratory epithelium; nasal epithelium; olfactory epithelium; superior surface of tongue; duodenum; intestinal villus; Paneth cell; jejunum; Ileal epithelium; More reference expression data |
| BioGPS | More reference expression data |
Gene ontology
| Molecular function | carbohydrate binding; peptidoglycan binding; oligosaccharide binding; transmembrane signaling receptor activity |
| Cellular component | cytoplasm; extracellular region; extracellular space |
| Biological process | positive regulation of wound healing; positive regulation of keratinocyte proliferation; negative regulation of keratinocyte differentiation; inflammatory response; acute-phase response; MyD88-dependent toll-like receptor signaling pathway; defense response to Gram-positive bacterium; antimicrobial humoral response; antimicrobial humoral immune response mediated by antimicrobial peptide; positive regulation of cell population proliferation; response to peptide hormone; cell wall disruption in other organism |
Sources:Amigo / QuickGO
Orthologs
| Databases | NCBI: entry; OMA: entry |
| Species | Human | Mouse |
| Entrez | 130120 | 19695 |
| Ensembl | ENSG00000143954 | ENSMUSG00000030017 |
| UniProt | Q6UW15 | O09049 |
| RefSeq (mRNA) | NM_001008387; NM_001270040; NM_198448 | NM_011260 |
| RefSeq (protein) | NP_001008388; NP_001256969; NP_940850 | NP_035390 |
| Location (UCSC) | Chr 2: 79.03 – 79.03 Mb | Chr 6: 78.44 – 78.45 Mb |
| PubMed search |
- Wikidata
| View/Edit Human | View/Edit Mouse |

Regenerating islet-derived protein 3 gamma (also Regenerating islet-derived protein III-gamma) is a protein that in humans is encoded by the REG3G gene.

Intestinal paneth cells produce REG3G (or REG3 gamma) via stimulation of toll-like receptors (TLRs) by pathogen-associated molecular patterns (PAMPs). REG3 gamma specifically targets Gram-positive bacteria because it binds to their surface peptidoglycan layer. It is one of several antimicrobial peptides produced by paneth cells.

== Bibliography ==
- Hillier LW, Graves TA, Fulton RS, et al. (2005). "Generation and annotation of the DNA sequences of human chromosomes 2 and 4". Nature. 434 (7034): 724–31. Bibcode:2005Natur.434..724H. doi:10.1038/nature03466. PMID 15815621.
- Laurine E, Manival X, Montgelard C, et al. (2005). "PAP IB, a new member of the Reg gene family: cloning, expression, structural properties, and evolution by gene duplication". Biochim. Biophys. Acta. 1727 (3): 177–87. doi:10.1016/j.bbaexp.2005.01.011. PMID 15777617. S2CID 24552883.
- Gerhard DS, Wagner L, Feingold EA, et al. (2004). "The status, quality, and expansion of the NIH full-length cDNA project: the Mammalian Gene Collection (MGC)". Genome Res. 14 (10B): 2121–7. doi:10.1101/gr.2596504. PMC 528928. PMID 15489334.
- Zhang Z, Henzel WJ (2005). "Signal peptide prediction based on analysis of experimentally verified cleavage sites". Protein Sci. 13 (10): 2819–24. doi:10.1110/ps.04682504. PMC 2286551. PMID 15340161.
- Strausberg RL, Feingold EA, Grouse LH, et al. (2003). "Generation and initial analysis of more than 15,000 full-length human and mouse cDNA sequences". Proc. Natl. Acad. Sci. U.S.A. 99 (26): 16899–903. Bibcode:2002PNAS...9916899M. doi:10.1073/pnas.242603899. PMC 139241. PMID 12477932.
- Brandl K, Plitas G, Schnabl B, DeMatteo RP, Pamer EG (2007). "MyD88-mediated signals induce the bactericidal lectin RegIII gamma and protect mice against intestinal Listeria monocytogenes infection". J. Exp. Med. 204 (8): 900–1891. doi:10.1084/jem.20070563. PMC 2118673. PMID 17635956.
