= Centroacinar cell =

Cell type in the exocrine pancreas

- Centroacinar cells are the subgroup of ductal cells (red) that extend into the acinus surrounded by acinar cells (green)

Details
- System: Digestive system
- Location: Pancreas
- Shape: Flattened or Cuboidal

Identifiers
- Latin: cellula centroacinosa
- TH: H3.04.07.0.00008

Centroacinar cells are flattened or cuboidal cells found in the exocrine pancreas. They function as special progenitor cells, and together with the similar ductal cells, they release bicarbonate.

Centroacinar cells are part of the exocrine pancreas, which means they are cells of the part of pancreas focused on releasing enzymes and other substances that aid with digestion (as opposed to the endocrine pancreas which releases hormones like insulin into the blood). The functional unit of the exocrine pancreas is the pancreatic acinus, which is a cluster of cells surrounding a cavity where enzymes are released, which then flow into its draining duct. Each acinus is surrounded by acinar cells which are responsible for releasing enzymes, while the ducts are surrounded by duct cells which release bicarbonate. The centroacinar cells are located in the region near the boundary of these two cell populations, and can be considered an extension of the intercalated duct into each pancreatic acinus. Similar to duct cells, centroacinar cells secrete an aqueous bicarbonate solution under stimulation by the hormone secretin, which helps protect the intestines (specifically the duodenum) from excessive acid. They are distinct from duct cells in their ability to differentiate into different types of pancreatic cells, such as insulin-producing beta cells in zebrafish.

The intercalated ducts take the bicarbonate to intralobular ducts which become lobular ducts. These lobular ducts finally converge to form the main pancreatic duct. These intercalated ducts take the bicarbonate to intralobular ducts which become lobular ducts. These lobular ducts finally converge to form the main pancreatic duct. These pancreatic ducts can act as a response mechanism when injury occurs and to avoid disruptions in the pancreatic lumen. This keeps the ionic content in check while keeping it open for flow to occur. Mutations that can occur because of blockage/ accumulation in the pancreatic duct are disorders such as cystic fibrosis.

== See also ==
- List of human cell types derived from the germ layers
- List of distinct cell types in the adult human body
