= Chymotrypsin-C =

Protein found in humans

CTRC

Identifiers
- Aliases: CTRC, CLCR, ELA4, chymotrypsin C
- External IDs: OMIM: 601405; MGI: 1923951; GeneCards: CTRC
Available structures
PDB	Ortholog search: PDBe RCSB
PDB	List of PDB id codes 4H4F
Enzyme activity
EC #	BRENDA	ExPASy	KEGG	MetaCyc
3.4.21.2	↗	↗	↗	↗

Gene location (Human)
Chr.	Chromosome 1 (human)
Band	1p36.21	Start	15,438,442 bp
Band	1p36.21	End	15,449,242 bp

Gene location (Mouse)
Chr.	Chromosome 4 (mouse)
Band	4|4 D3	Start	141,565,550 bp
Band	4|4 D3	End	141,573,670 bp
RNA expression pattern
Bgee	Human / Mouse (ortholog); Top expressed in: body of pancreas; islet of Langerhans; pancreatic epithelial cell; beta cell; pancreatic ductal cell; right coronary artery; ectocervix; Descending thoracic aorta; granulocyte; right lobe of liver / Top expressed in: pyloric antrum; pancreas; islet of Langerhans; embryo; embryo; morula; duodenum; blastocyst; mesenteric lymph nodes; spleen; More reference expression data
BioGPS	n/a
Gene ontology
Molecular function	peptidase activity; serine-type peptidase activity; serine-type endopeptidase activity; protein binding; hydrolase activity
Cellular component	extracellular region
Biological process	cobalamin metabolic process; proteolysis
Sources:Amigo / QuickGO
Orthologs
Databases	NCBI: entry; OMA: entry
Species	Human	Mouse
Entrez	11330	76701
Ensembl	ENSG00000162438	ENSMUSG00000062478
UniProt	Q99895	Q3SYP2
RefSeq (mRNA)	NM_007272	NM_001033875
RefSeq (protein)	NP_009203	NP_001029047
Location (UCSC)	Chr 1: 15.44 – 15.45 Mb	Chr 4: 141.57 – 141.57 Mb
PubMed search
- Wikidata
View/Edit Human	View/Edit Mouse

Chymotrypsin-C, also known as caldecrin or elastase 4, is an enzyme that in humans is encoded by the CTRC gene. This enzyme is primarily produced in the pancreas by acinar cells, where it is involved in regulating the activation of digestive enzymes like trypsins and carboxypeptidases.

== Function ==
Chymotrypsin C is a member of the peptidase S1 family. The encoded protein is a serum calcium-decreasing factor that has chymotrypsin-like protease activity. In other words, it is involved in breaking peptide bonds in proteins. It catalyzes the preferential cleavage of peptide bonds from the following amino acids:

Leu┼, Tyr┼, Phe┼, Met┼, Trp┼, Gln┼, Asn┼

This is enzyme activity is similar to chymotrypsin A/B (EC 3.4.21.1), but with some differences such as a preference for breaking leucine over phenylalanine bonds.

A protein with similar enzyme activity can also be formed from pig chymotrypsinogen C and cattle subunit II of procarboxypeptidase A.

== See also ==
- Acinar cell
