= CTNNBIP1 =

Protein-coding gene in humans

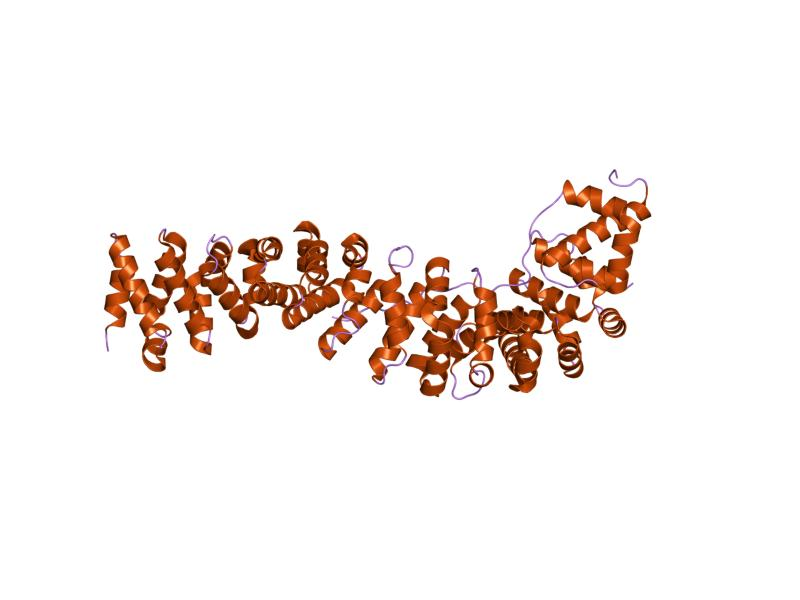

Identifiers
- Aliases: CTNNBIP1, ICAT, catenin beta interacting protein 1
- External IDs: OMIM: 607758; MGI: 1915756; GeneCards: CTNNBIP1
Available structures
PDB	Ortholog search: PDBe RCSB
PDB	List of PDB id codes 1M1E, 1T08

Gene location (Human)
Chr.	Chromosome 1 (human)
Band	1p36.22	Start	9,848,276 bp
Band	1p36.22	End	9,910,336 bp

Gene location (Mouse)
Chr.	Chromosome 4 (mouse)
Band	4|4 E2	Start	149,602,693 bp
Band	4|4 E2	End	149,650,894 bp
RNA expression pattern
Bgee	Human / Mouse (ortholog); Top expressed in: skin of leg; skin of abdomen; skin of thigh; skin of arm; nipple; apex of heart; human penis; skin of hip; olfactory zone of nasal mucosa; paraflocculus of cerebellum / Top expressed in: saccule; habenula; otic placode; lip; esophagus; otic vesicle; skin of external ear; ventricular zone; medial ganglionic eminence; neural tube; More reference expression data
BioGPS	n/a
Gene ontology
Molecular function	beta-catenin binding; protein binding; armadillo repeat domain binding
Cellular component	cytoplasm; cytosol; nucleoplasm; nucleus; beta-catenin destruction complex
Biological process	negative regulation of smooth muscle cell proliferation; negative regulation of protein-containing complex assembly; negative regulation of DNA binding; negative regulation of Wnt signaling pathway; regulation of vascular permeability involved in acute inflammatory response; negative regulation of transcription by RNA polymerase II; Wnt signaling pathway; negative regulation of protein binding; negative regulation of DNA-binding transcription factor activity; branching involved in ureteric bud morphogenesis; positive regulation of osteoblast differentiation; positive regulation of monocyte differentiation; negative regulation of transcription initiation from RNA polymerase II promoter; negative regulation of mesenchymal cell proliferation; anterior/posterior pattern specification
Sources:Amigo / QuickGO
Orthologs
Databases	NCBI: entry; OMA: entry
Species	Human	Mouse
Entrez	56998	67087
Ensembl	ENSG00000178585	ENSMUSG00000028988
UniProt	Q9NSA3	Q9JJN6
RefSeq (mRNA)	NM_020248; NM_001012329	NM_001141930; NM_023465
RefSeq (protein)	NP_001012329; NP_064633	NP_001135402; NP_075954
Location (UCSC)	Chr 1: 9.85 – 9.91 Mb	Chr 4: 149.6 – 149.65 Mb
PubMed search
- Wikidata
View/Edit Human	View/Edit Mouse

Beta-catenin-interacting protein 1 is a protein that is encoded in humans by the CTNNBIP1 gene.

== Function ==
The protein encoded by this gene binds CTNNB1 and prevents interaction between CTNNB1 and TCF (T-cell transcription factor) family members. The encoded protein is a negative regulator of the Wnt signaling pathway.
