= CELA2B =

Protein-coding gene in humans

Identifiers
- Aliases: CELA2B, ELA2B, chymotrypsin like elastase family member 2B, chymotrypsin like elastase 2B
- External IDs: OMIM: 609444; GeneCards: CELA2B
Enzyme activity
EC #	BRENDA	ExPASy	KEGG	MetaCyc
3.4.21.71	↗	↗	↗	↗

Gene location (Human)
Chr.	Chromosome 1 (human)
Band	1p36.21	Start	15,465,909 bp
Band	1p36.21	End	15,491,395 bp
RNA expression pattern
Bgee	Human / Mouse (ortholog); Top expressed in: body of pancreas; testicle; islet of Langerhans; pancreatic epithelial cell; pancreatic ductal cell; left adrenal cortex; right adrenal cortex; right hemisphere of cerebellum; left ovary; stromal cell of endometrium / n/a; More reference expression data
BioGPS	n/a
Gene ontology
Molecular function	peptidase activity; serine-type peptidase activity; hydrolase activity; serine-type endopeptidase activity
Cellular component	extracellular region; extracellular space
Biological process	proteolysis
Sources:Amigo / QuickGO
Orthologs
Databases	NCBI: entry; OMA: entry
Species	Human	Mouse
Entrez	51032	n/a
Ensembl	ENSG00000215704	n/a
UniProt	P08218	n/a
RefSeq (mRNA)	NM_015849	n/a
RefSeq (protein)	NP_056933	n/a
Location (UCSC)	Chr 1: 15.47 – 15.49 Mb	n/a
PubMed search		n/a
- Wikidata
View/Edit Human

Chymotrypsin-like elastase family member 2B is and enzyme that in humans is encoded by the CELA2B gene.

== Function ==
Elastases form a subfamily of serine proteases that hydrolyze many proteins in addition to elastin. Humans have six elastase genes which encode the structurally similar proteins elastase 1, 2, 2A, 2B, 3A, and 3B. Like most of the human elastases, elastase 2B is secreted from the acinar cells of the pancreas as a zymogen. In other species, elastase 2B has been shown to preferentially cleave proteins after leucine, methionine, and phenylalanine residues.
