= Glycoprotein 2 =

Protein found in humans

GP2

Identifiers
- Aliases: GP2, ZAP75, glycoprotein 2
- External IDs: OMIM: 602977; MGI: 1914383; GeneCards: GP2

Gene location (Human)
Chr.	Chromosome 16 (human)
Band	16p12.3	Start	20,309,574 bp
Band	16p12.3	End	20,327,808 bp

Gene location (Mouse)
Chr.	Chromosome 7 (mouse)
Band	7 F2|7 63.88 cM	Start	119,041,760 bp
Band	7 F2|7 63.88 cM	End	119,058,508 bp
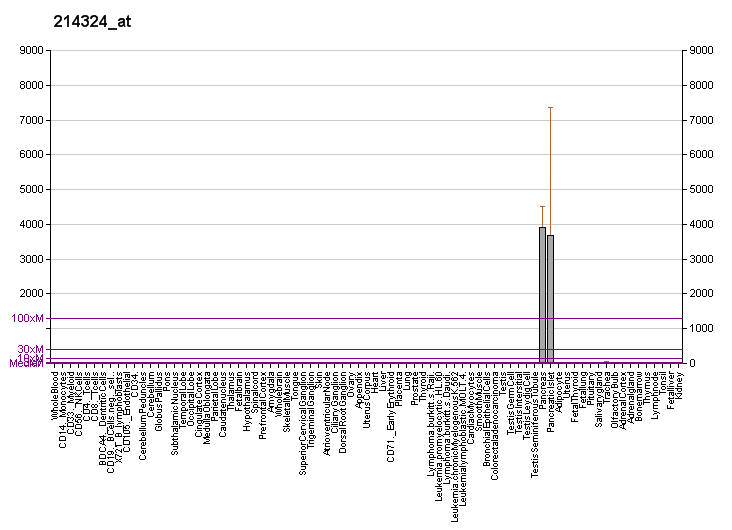

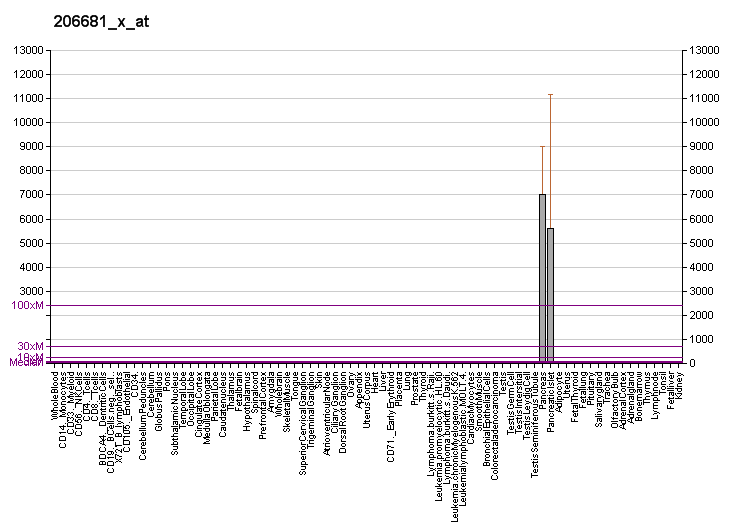

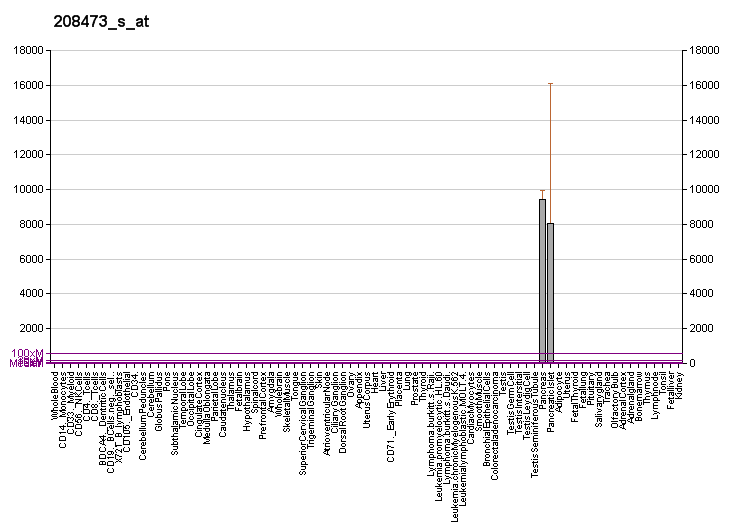
RNA expression pattern
Bgee	Human / Mouse (ortholog); Top expressed in: body of pancreas; islet of Langerhans; pancreatic ductal cell; gallbladder; olfactory zone of nasal mucosa; sperm; duodenum; renal medulla; pylorus; prostate / Top expressed in: pyloric antrum; trachea; islet of Langerhans; duodenum; conjunctival fornix; olfactory epithelium; lumbar spinal ganglion; right kidney; thymus; cervix; More reference expression data
BioGPS	More reference expression data
Orthologs
Databases	NCBI: entry; OMA: entry
Species	Human	Mouse
Entrez	2813	67133
Ensembl	ENSG00000169347	ENSMUSG00000030954
UniProt	P55259	Q9D733
RefSeq (mRNA)	NM_001007240; NM_001007241; NM_001007242; NM_001502	NM_025989
RefSeq (protein)	NP_001007241; NP_001007242; NP_001007243; NP_001493	NP_080265
Location (UCSC)	Chr 16: 20.31 – 20.33 Mb	Chr 7: 119.04 – 119.06 Mb
PubMed search
- Wikidata
View/Edit Human	View/Edit Mouse

Glycoprotein 2 (also called Pancreatic secretory granule membrane major glycoprotein GP2) is a protein that in humans is encoded by the GP2 gene. This protein is involved in the immune response to type-I-piliated bacteria, binding to bacteria like E. coli in the intestines and delivering them to lymph nodes.
