= CELA2A =

Protein-coding gene in humans

Identifiers
- Aliases: CELA2A, ELA2A, PE-1, chymotrypsin like elastase family member 2A, chymotrypsin like elastase 2A, AOMS4
- External IDs: OMIM: 609443; MGI: 95316; GeneCards: CELA2A
Enzyme activity
EC #	BRENDA	ExPASy	KEGG	MetaCyc
3.4.21.71	↗	↗	↗	↗

Gene location (Human)
Chr.	Chromosome 1 (human)
Band	1p36.21	Start	15,456,728 bp
Band	1p36.21	End	15,472,091 bp

Gene location (Mouse)
Chr.	Chromosome 4 (mouse)
Band	4 D3|4 74.75 cM	Start	141,542,273 bp
Band	4 D3|4 74.75 cM	End	141,553,471 bp
RNA expression pattern
Bgee	Human / Mouse (ortholog); Top expressed in: body of pancreas; islet of Langerhans; duodenum; testicle; right adrenal gland; left adrenal gland; left adrenal cortex; right adrenal cortex; ectocervix; fundus / Top expressed in: pyloric antrum; islet of Langerhans; pancreatic acinus; duodenum; sexually immature organism; blastocyst; embryo; embryo; morula; esophagus; More reference expression data
BioGPS	More reference expression data
Gene ontology
Molecular function	serine hydrolase activity; peptidase activity; serine-type peptidase activity; hydrolase activity; endopeptidase activity; serine-type endopeptidase activity
Cellular component	keratohyalin granule; extracellular region; extracellular space; cytosol
Biological process	proteolysis; cornification
Sources:Amigo / QuickGO
Orthologs
Databases	NCBI: entry; OMA: entry
Species	Human	Mouse
Entrez	63036	13706
Ensembl	ENSG00000142615	ENSMUSG00000058579
UniProt	P08217	P05208
RefSeq (mRNA)	NM_033440	NM_007919
RefSeq (protein)	NP_254275	NP_031945
Location (UCSC)	Chr 1: 15.46 – 15.47 Mb	Chr 4: 141.54 – 141.55 Mb
PubMed search
- Wikidata
View/Edit Human	View/Edit Mouse

Chymotrypsin-like elastase family member 2A is an enzyme that in humans is encoded by the CELA2A gene.

== Function ==
Elastases form a subfamily of serine proteases that hydrolyze many proteins in addition to elastin. Humans have six elastase genes which encode the structurally similar proteins elastase 1, 2, 2A, 2B, 3A, and 3B. Like most of the human elastases, elastase 2A is secreted from the acinar cells of the pancreas as a zymogen. In other species, elastase 2A has been shown to preferentially cleave proteins after leucine, methionine, and phenylalanine residues. Clinical literature that describes human elastase 1 activity in the pancreas is actually referring to elastase 2A.
