= PTF1A =

Protein-coding gene in the species Homo sapiens

Identifiers
- Aliases: PTF1A, PACA, PAGEN2, PTF1-p48, bHLHa29, pancreas specific transcription factor, 1a, p48, pancreas associated transcription factor 1a
- External IDs: OMIM: 607194; MGI: 1328312; GeneCards: PTF1A

Gene location (Human)
Chr.	Chromosome 10 (human)
Band	10p12.2	Start	23,192,312 bp
Band	10p12.2	End	23,194,245 bp

Gene location (Mouse)
Chr.	Chromosome 2 (mouse)
Band	2|2 A3	Start	19,450,474 bp
Band	2|2 A3	End	19,452,312 bp
RNA expression pattern
Bgee	Human / Mouse (ortholog); Top expressed in: body of pancreas; islet of Langerhans; gonad; body of stomach; right testis; left testis; Brodmann area 9; fundus; putamen; nucleus accumbens / Top expressed in: pyloric antrum; urethra; female urethra; male urethra; rhombic lip; gray matter layer of cerebellum; medial ganglionic eminence; epithelium of stomach; pancreatic acinus; islet of Langerhans; More reference expression data
BioGPS	n/a
Gene ontology
Molecular function	RNA polymerase II cis-regulatory region sequence-specific DNA binding; sequence-specific DNA binding; protein dimerization activity; DNA-binding transcription activator activity, RNA polymerase II-specific; chromatin binding; E-box binding; DNA binding; DNA-binding transcription factor activity, RNA polymerase II-specific
Cellular component	intracellular anatomical structure; nucleus; cytoplasm; transcription regulator complex
Biological process	cell differentiation; cell fate commitment; hindbrain development; transcription by RNA polymerase II; cerebellum development; transcription, DNA-templated; nervous system development; generation of neurons; multicellular organism development; positive regulation of transcription, DNA-templated; retina morphogenesis in camera-type eye; retinoic acid receptor signaling pathway; tissue development; pancreas development; neuron fate commitment; positive regulation of transcription by RNA polymerase II; regulation of neural retina development; exocrine pancreas development; retina layer formation; amacrine cell differentiation; regulation of transcription, DNA-templated
Sources:Amigo / QuickGO
Orthologs
Databases	NCBI: entry; OMA: entry
Species	Human	Mouse
Entrez	256297	19213
Ensembl	ENSG00000168267	ENSMUSG00000026735
UniProt	Q7RTS3	Q9QX98
RefSeq (mRNA)	NM_178161	NM_018809
RefSeq (protein)	NP_835455	NP_061279
Location (UCSC)	Chr 10: 23.19 – 23.19 Mb	Chr 2: 19.45 – 19.45 Mb
PubMed search
- Wikidata
View/Edit Human	View/Edit Mouse

Pancreas transcription factor 1 subunit alpha is a protein that in humans is encoded by the PTF1A gene.

== Function ==
This gene encodes a protein that is a component of the pancreas transcription factor 1 complex (PTF1) and is known to have a role in mammalian pancreatic development. The protein plays a role in determining whether cells allocated to the pancreatic buds continue towards pancreatic organogenesis or revert to duodenal fates. The protein is thought to be involved in the maintenance of exocrine pancreas-specific gene expression including elastase 1 and amylase. Mutations in this gene cause cerebellar agenesis and loss of expression is seen in ductal type pancreas cancers.
