= Pancreatic ductal cell =

Epithelial cell lining of the pancreatic duct

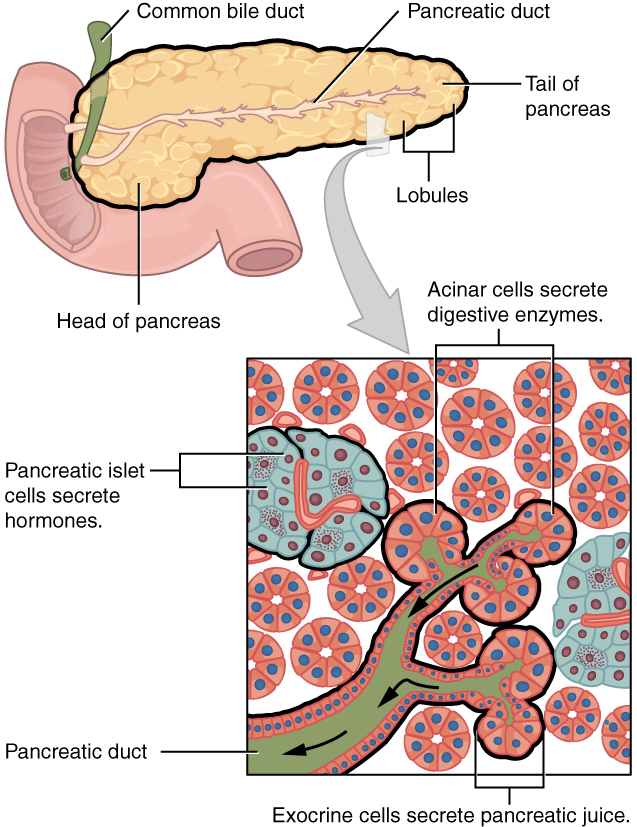
- A diagram of exocrine pancreas. The ductal cells will deliver enzymes from the acinar cells to the duodenum.

Details
- System: Digestive system
- Location: Pancreas
- Shape: Cuboidal
- Function: Bicarbonate secretion

Identifiers
- FMA: 63099

Pancreatic ductal cells are the epithelial cells that line the pancreatic ducts which deliver enzymes from the acinar cells to the duodenum. They have the essential function of producing bicarbonate-rich (HCO3-) secretion to neutralize stomach acidity. The hormone secretin stimulates ductal cells and is responsible for maintaining the duodenal pH and preventing duodenal injury from acidic chyme. Ductal cells mix their production with acinar cells to make up the pancreatic juice.

Ductal cells comprise about 10% of the pancreas by number and about 4% in volume. Its function is to secrete bicarbonate and mucins and to form the tubule network that transfers enzymes made by acinar cells to the duodenum. Ductal cells have a proliferation rate of about 0.5% in normal adults, but mitotic activity goes up when the pancreas is damaged.

== Ductal network ==
The ductal pancreas network originates from the central pancreatic duct—this main duct with the bile duct opens into the duodenum. The ductal cells of the main pancreatic duct are bound by connective tissue and produce a columnar epithelium. Interlobular ducts originate from the main pancreatic duct and connect the various pancreatic lobes. In these lobes, the intercalated ducts expel acini. Meanwhile, the ductal cells of these intercalated ducts create a simple squamous epithelium that rapidly converts into simple cuboidal epithelium, and connective tissue also surrounds them. As the ducts grow larger, the epithelium becomes cuboidal or columnar (when large in diameter, the ducts become stratified cuboidal), and connective tissue surrounds them. Pancreatic ductal cells are very similar to ductal cells of other exocrine glands (liver, bile duct, salivary glands). Because of this, a common diagnosis affects these cells: cystic fibrosis.

== Ductal cell physiology ==
While ductal cells are a minor type of cell in the adult pancreas, they have a critical function besides making the network that transfers enzymes from acini to the digestive tract. The primary function of pancreas ductal cells is to secrete a bicarbonate-rich, isotonic fluid. This fluid washes away the inactive form of digestive enzymes in the ductal system, neutralizes stomach acidity and mucins, and creates a pH environment necessary for the pancreas's normal function.

Multiple factors affect the rate of bicarbonate secretion: species, cell location in the ductal system, secretory rate, etc. When stimulated, bicarbonate levels can get to 140mM. Due to this, there is a contrast in concentration between the outside and inside environment of ductal cells. The channels and ion transporters on ductal cells vary on the luminal and basolateral membrane, meaning there is functional polarization of the ductal cell.

The largest network branches in this system contain goblet cells that interact with ductal cells, making up about 2% of this structure—these cells aid mucin assembly. Furthermore, unlike other exocrine glands, the pancreas does not have myoepithelial cells around the ducts. Ductal cells have a single cilium that is made up of nine peripheral doublets but does not have a central microtubule. This cilium is considered vital for perceiving flow in ducts.

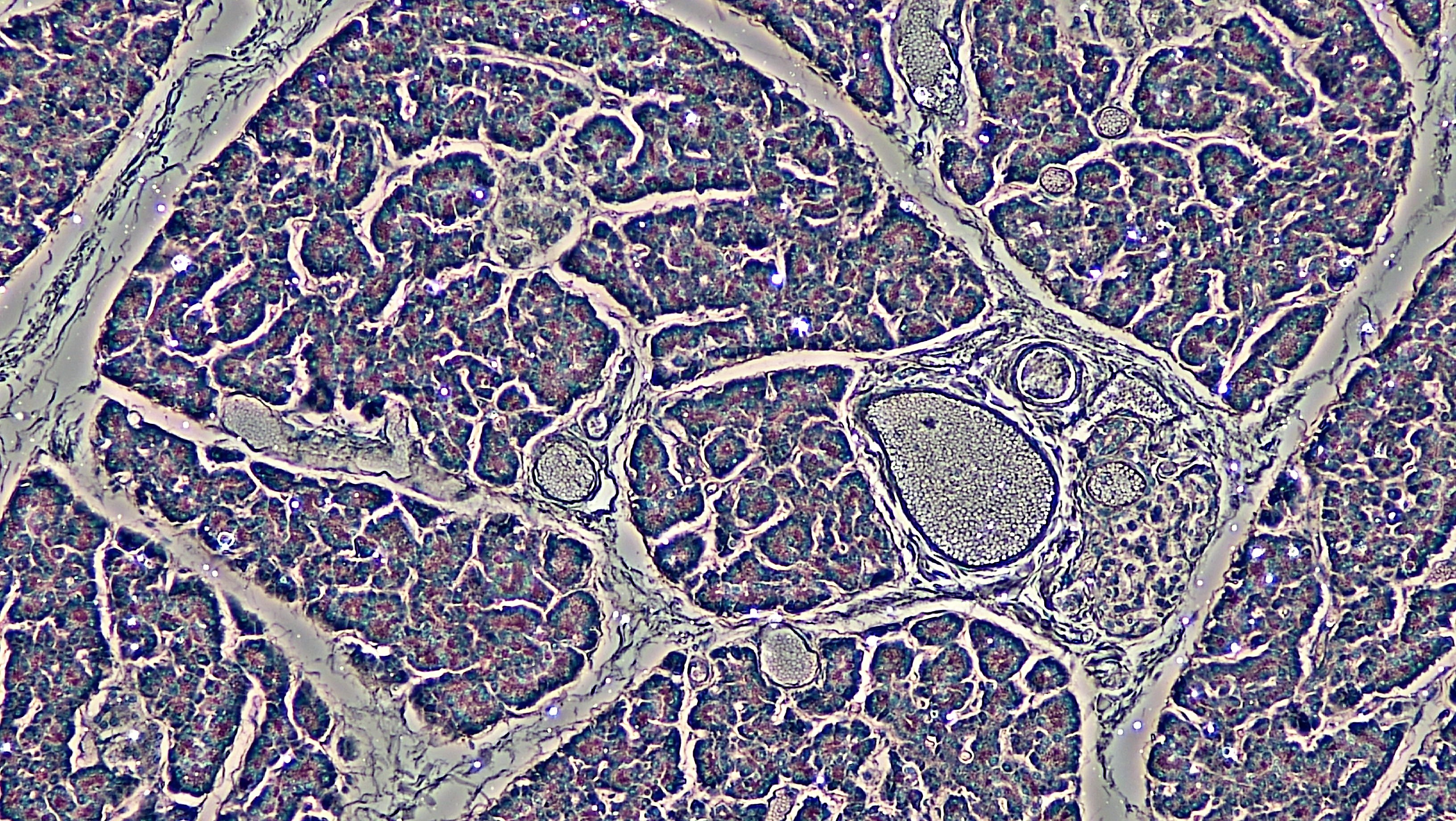
Ductal System of the Exocrine Pancreas by Phase Contrast

== Exocrine cell type ==
Morphology is what identifies ductal cells. However, there is barely anything to differentiate pancreatic ductal cells from other bodily ductal cells. There is still a lot unknown about these ductal cells. Their molecular identity still needs to be improved; more knowledge is necessary regarding stage-specific markers and the regulators of ductal cell development. It recently was discovered that the ducts start as separate microlumens in a stratified epithelium that expand, attach, and resolve to form the pancreatic ducts. These cells work with intercalating ducts that link to distinct acini and are within the larger ducts in the two core pancreatic ducts (dorsal and ventral duct) that drain into the intestine.

Ductal cells are exocrine, but they are more like endocrine cells when developing. A recent lineage analysis showed that ductal cells came directly from bipotent precursor cells and have the possibility of creating either ductal or endocrine cells. Meanwhile, mature ducts have a restricted ability to transdifferentiate to other types of cells, even when the pancreas is injured.

== Ductal cell plasticity ==
There is disagreement about the plasticity potential of ductal cells in the adult pancreas. In the embryonic pancreas, the endocrine and exocrine cells originate in the pancreatic ducts as progenitor cells. In adult ductal cells, there are observations that these cells take on the identity of progenitor cells when stressed. This proposes the idea that there might be a subgroup of ductal cells that have the ability to dedifferentiate and generate endocrine cells when there is an injury to the pancreas. Essentially, ductal cells function in retaining the adult pancreas β cell mass when injured. However, there is a possibility that this capability is limited to a subtype of ductal cells only, meaning this cannot be a main pathway for pancreas regeneration.

== Associated pathologies ==
=== Cystic fibrosis ===
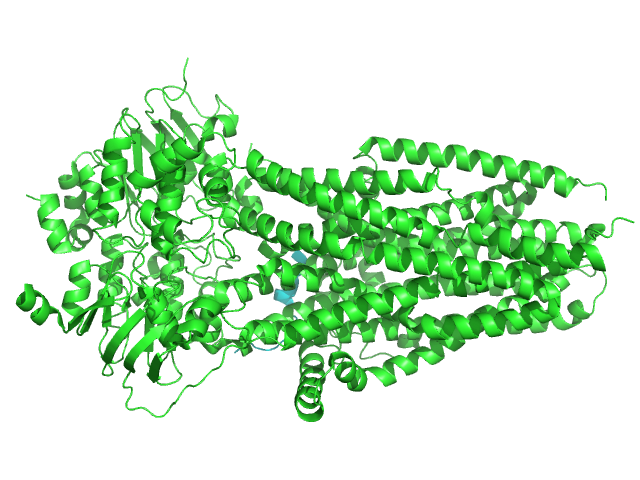
Human cystic fibrosis transmembrane conductance regulator (CFTR)

Cystic fibrosis affects pancreatic ducts as well as many other secretory epithelia. Cystic fibrosis transmembrane conductance regulator (CFTR) is the mutated gene and is essential to chloride and bicarbonate secretion. The abnormal amount of anion secretion causes a reduced amount of ductal water flow. Because of this, the duct's protein concentration increases and causes the duct lumina to get plugged. The onset of cystic fibrosis affects the pancreas more than any other organ (even before birth).

=== Pancreatitis ===
The incorrect activation of proteolytic enzymes leads to edema, inflammation, and possible pancreas necrosis, causing acute pancreatitis. The most prominent cause of acute pancreatitis is gallstones. Permanent damage is possible from chronic pancreatitis due to progressive inflammation and the reoccurrence of acute pancreatitis. Acute pancreatitis is caused by mutations in a trypsinogen inhibitor, while a mutation in CFTR causes chronic pancreatitis. In fact, chronic pancreatitis often causes pancreatic adenocarcinoma.

=== Pancreatic ductal adenocarcinoma ===
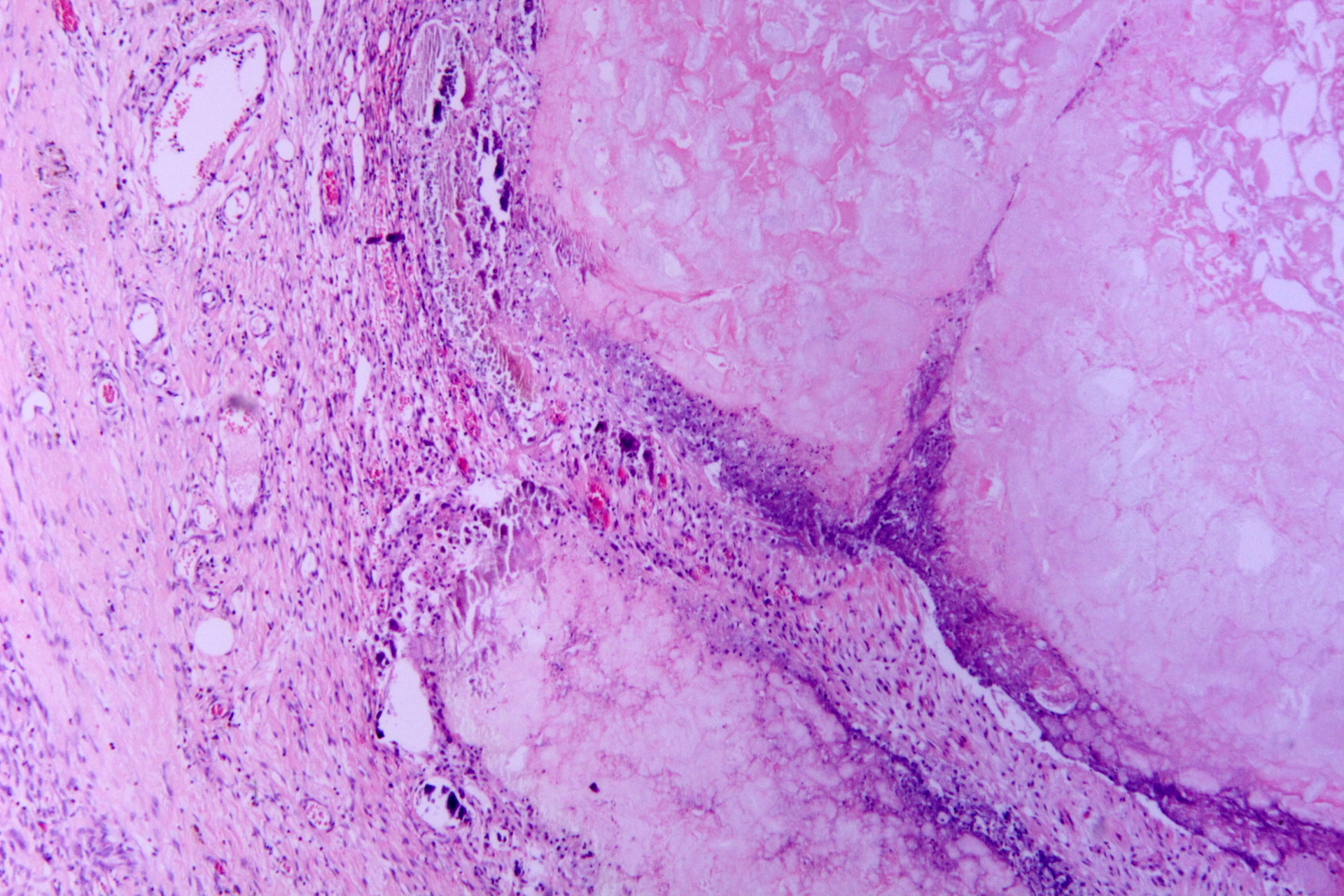
Tissue necrosis in chronic pancreatitis

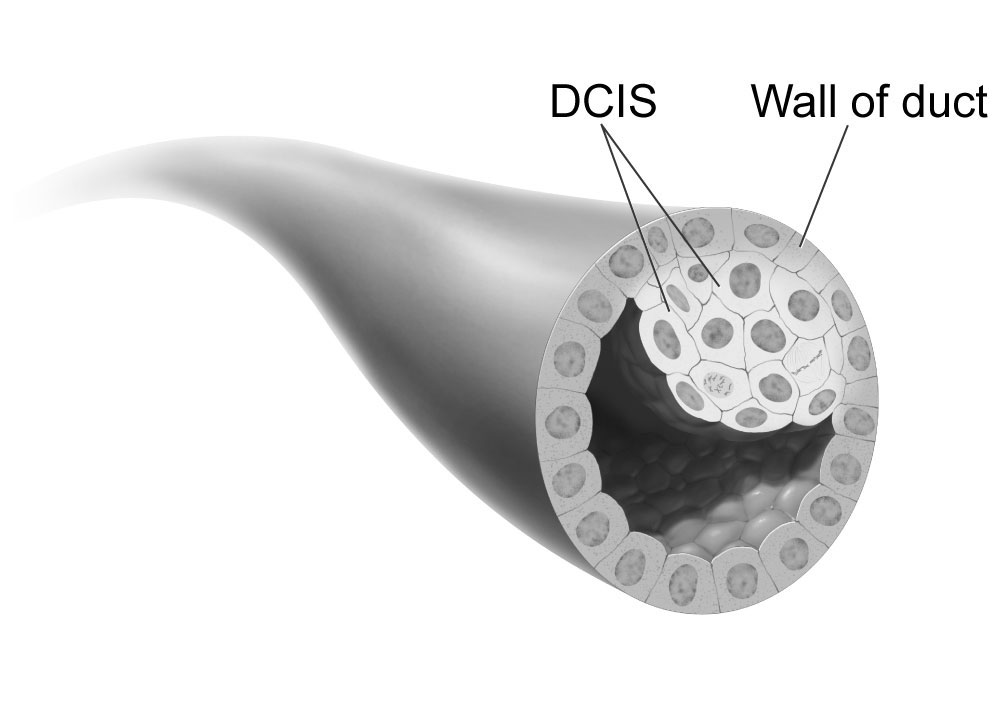
A breast duct with ductal carcinoma in situ (DCIS)

Pancreatic Ductal Adenocarcinoma (PDAC) is one of the most lethal cancers and has a 5-year survival rate of 13%. Pancreatic adenocarcinoma cells resemble pancreatic ductal cells. Both cell groups show tubule formation, cuboidal shape, and ductal markers. Additionally, acinar and endocrine cells have often been found in many of these cancers, demonstrating plasticity and the possibility that the initial target cells are pancreas progenitor cells. Moreover, human tumors usually go with lower-grade lesions that are called pancreatic intraepithelial neoplasias (PanINs) and are in ducts. Because these lesions are in ducts, this means that it is possible that the beginning target cells are ductal cells.
