= Blackwater fever =

Complication of malaria

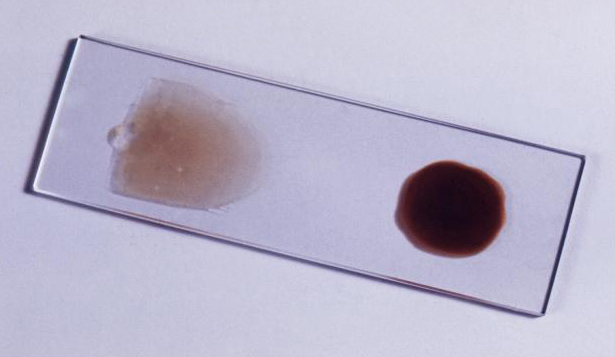
- A blood film confirming an official malaria diagnosis.
- Specialty: Infectious disease
- Causes: Malaria

Blackwater fever is a severe complication of the malaria infection in which the Plasmodium parasites (transmitted by mosquitoes) cause the red blood cells to burst in the bloodstream (hemolysis), releasing hemoglobin directly into the blood vessels and into the urine, frequently leading to kidney failure. The disease was first linked to malaria by Sierra Leone Creole physician John Farrell Easmon in his 1884 pamphlet entitled The Nature and Treatment of Blackwater Fever. Easmon coined the name "blackwater fever" and was the first to successfully treat such cases following the publication of his pamphlet. The disease is much less common today than it was before 1950.

== Symptoms ==
Within a few days of onset there are chills, with rigor, high fever, jaundice, vomiting, rapidly progressive anemia, and dark red or black urine. Intravascular hemolytic crises occur with rapid and massive destruction of red blood cells resulting in hemoglobinemia (hemoglobin in the blood, but outside the red blood cells), hemoglobinuria (hemoglobin in urine), intense jaundice, anuria (passing less than 50 milliliters of urine in a day), and finally death in the majority of cases.

== Cause ==
Blackwater fever is caused by heavy parasitization of red blood cells with Plasmodium falciparum Plasmodium malariae, or Plasmodium knowlesi, and probably an autoimmune reaction caused by the interaction of the parasite and the use of quinine. While quinine remains important for treatment of malaria, it is no longer commonly used for malaria prophylaxis. Cases have also been attributed to Plasmodium vivax.

== Diagnosis ==
Blackwater fever may be suspected in a malaria patient who is intermittently passing dark-red to black urine, and is diagnosed using a urine dipstick test, which will be positive for hemoglobin. Microscopy of the urine will be negative for erythrocytes.

== Treatment ==
Blackwater fever is treated with antimalarial chemotherapy, intravenous fluid and sometimes supportive care such as intensive care and dialysis.

== Society and culture ==
=== Prominent victims ===
- Brigadier General Charles Young first contracted malignant malaria, also known as blackwater fever, in 1913 during a military expedition in Liberia. Given his vulnerability to the disease, he and his family understood that military orders dispatching him back to Liberia in 1921 were akin to suicide, but he refused to retire from the U.S. Army or try to alter his military orders. He contracted the disease again during a visit to Nigeria and died in 1922. The U.S. Army posthumously promoted Young to Brigadier General in 2021.
- Prior to his photography career, Henri Cartier-Bresson contracted blackwater fever while hunting in Western Africa. Expecting to die, he sent instructions to his family on his wishes for a funeral. He made a full recovery.
- British mariner and naval officer Charles Lightoller contracted malaria c. 1897 during his tenure in Elder Dempster Lines. In his autobiography, he describes suffering from severe complications, including blackwater fever and a temperature of 106°F. He was treated by his shipmates and made a full recovery.
- Zoologist John Samuel Budgett died from the disease in 1904, after returning from a collecting trip to West Africa, in search of specimens of the fish Polypterus.
- Missionary Mamie Martin died of blackwater fever in 1928 after giving birth to her still born son. Her only daughter founded a charity in her name.
- Missionary and explorer George Grenfell died after a bad attack of blackwater fever at Basoko on 1 July 1906.
- Jesse Brand, a missionary to the Chat Mountains in India, died of blackwater fever in 1928.
- Actor Don Adams, best known as Maxwell Smart from the popular sitcom Get Smart and as the title character in Inspector Gadget, contracted blackwater fever at Guadalcanal during World War II. Adams was evacuated from his United States Marine Corps unit to a hospital in New Zealand where he ultimately made a full recovery.
- Humanitarian and MMA fighter Justin Wren contracted malaria, which devolved into blackwater fever, while drilling water-wells for Congo Pygmies in 2013. The affliction nearly claimed Wren's life. He was misdiagnosed four times and required airlift to Uganda, where he narrowly recovered from severe symptoms.
- Aeneas, Jeannie Gunn's husband, is described as having died from Blackwater Fever or Malarial Dysentry at Elsey Station in the Northern Territory in 1903. She later authored the classic account We of the Never Never.
- Russian anthropologist Bernard Deacon died of blackwater fever in Malakula in 1927.
- Peter Cameron Scott, a Scottish-American missionary and founder of Africa Inland Mission, died from the disease in December 1896.
- Henry Stricker, South African cricketer

== See also ==
- Malarial nephropathy
