= MChip =

Portable blood test device

mChip is a portable blood test device which is capable of diagnosing an infection of HIV or Syphilis within 15 minutes and could be used effectively against HIV/AIDS in developing countries. The mChip costs about US$ 1 and the entire diagnostic kit costs about US$ 100. mChip was developed so that people in regions with poor health facilities can access portable diagnosis for HIV/AIDS rather than travelling long distances to go to clinics for diagnosis.

== Background ==
Lateral flow test is one of the blood testing methods used, in which a blood sample or oral fluid is placed on a strip of paper. In this method, a colored band indicates infection.

People in lesser developed regions like the Sub-Saharan Africa are adversely affected by HIV/AIDS and have very limited access to clinical labs or hospitals. There have been estimates which have indicated that there are about 22.5 million people with HIV/AIDS in such regions and hence there is a high demand for portable blood test devices. Hence devices like mChip will be able to diagnose HIV/AIDS in such regions

== Development ==
mChip was developed by scientists at Columbia University in New York City. Initial testing of this device was undertaken in a village in Rwanda, where, according to the World Health Organization, approximately 3 percent of the population has HIV/AIDS. Of the 400 volunteers who turned up for testing, 399 were correctly diagnosed with an accuracy of nearly 100 percent. mChip was also tested for its effectiveness in diagnosing syphilis, where, out of the 67 volunteers who turned up for testing, 63 were correctly diagnosed with an accuracy of nearly 94 percent. The appearance of mChip resembles a credit card. and is estimated to cost just US$ 1.

== Operation ==
The operation of mChip is similar to that of ELISA (Enzyme-Linked Immunosorbent Assay). The ELISA can be performed to evaluate either the presence of antigen or the presence of antibody in a sample. It is a useful tool for determining serum antibody concentrations such as with the HIV test. The mChip contains 10 zones which detect the passage of a small amount (about 1μl) of blood. The results can be obtained in a color-coded format in about 15 minutes.

== See also ==
- Blood test
- HIV test
- BDNA test
- Pregnancy test
- Reference ranges for blood tests
- Schumm test
