= Hjalmarsson =

Hjalmarsson or Hjálmarsson is a patronymic surname meaning "son of Hjalmar". Notable people with the surname include:

- Barbro Hjalmarsson (1919–2012), Swedish nurse and inventor
- Gustav Hjalmarsson (born 1986), Swedish ice hockey player
- Niklas Hjalmarsson (born 1987), Swedish ice hockey player
- Simon Hjalmarsson (born 1989), Swedish ice hockey player
- Vilhjálmur Hjálmarsson (1914–2014), Icelandic politician
