= Intravascular hemolysis =

Medical condition, form of hemolytic anemia

Intravascular hemolysis describes hemolysis that happens mainly inside the vasculature. As a result, the contents of the red blood cell (RBC) are released into the general circulation, leading to hemoglobinemia and increasing the risk of ensuing hyperbilirubinemia.

== Mechanism ==
Intravascular hemolysis is when red blood cells rupture as a result of the complex of complement autoantibodies attached (fixed) on the surfaces of RBCs attack and rupture RBCs' membranes, or a parasite such as Babesia exits the cells and ruptures the RBC's membranes as it leaves.

Upon an RBC's rupture, components of the cell are released and circulate in the blood plasma.

These components include hemoglobin and others. At this stage, the hemoglobin is called free hemoglobin. Free hemoglobin (also called naked hemoglobin) is the unbound hemoglobin that is not enclosed in the red blood cell. The naked hemoglobin is devoid of its anti-oxidant sentries that are normally available within the RBC. Free hemoglobin is thus vulnerable to being oxidized.

When the serum concentration of free hemoglobin is within the physiologic range of haptoglobin, the potential deleterious effects of free hemoglobin are prevented because haptoglobin will bind to "free hemoglobin" forming a complex of "free hemoglobin-haptoglobin" evidenced by reduced amount of haptoglobin. However, during hyper-hemolytic conditions or with chronic hemolysis, haptoglobin is depleted so the remaining free hemoglobin readily distributes to tissues where it might be exposed to oxidative conditions. Thus some of the ferrous iron ions (Fe^{2+}) present in heme, the oxygen-binding component of the free hemoglobin, are oxidized, forming met-hemoglobin (ferric hemoglobin). In such conditions, heme along with globin chains can be released from further oxidization of met-hemoglobin (ferric Hb). The free heme can then accelerate tissue damage by promoting peroxidative reactions and activation of inflammatory cascades. At this time, hemopexin, another plasma glycoprotein, comes to bind with heme with high affinity, forming a non-toxic complex of heme-hemopexin that travels together to bind a receptor on hepatocytes and macrophages within the spleen, liver and bone marrow. (Note: Note that the "free hemoglobin-haptoglobin" complex is taken up by hepatocytes and, to a lesser extent, macrophages.) Thereafter, these complexes will undergo the metabolic mechanisms like extravascular hemolysis.

Nevertheless, if the binding capacities of haptoglobin and hemopexin are saturated, (Note: Haptoglobin and hemopexin are not recyclable.) the remaining "free hemoglobin" in the plasma will be oxidized to met-hemoglobin eventually, and then further disassociates into free heme and globin. At this stage, the "free heme" will bind to albumin, forming met-hemalbumin. The remaining unbound (met)hemoglobin is filtered into the primary urine and re-absorbed via proximal tubules of the kidney. In the proximal tubules, the iron is extracted and stored as hemosiderin. (Note: Long-term hemoglobinuria is associated with substantial deposition of hemosiderin in proximal tubule (excessive accumulation of hemosiderin in proximal tubule), Fanconi syndrome (damaged renal re-absorption capability of small molecules which give rises to hyper-aminoaciduria, glycosuria, hyperphosphaturia, and bicarbonate and dehydration), and chronic kidney failure.)

In the end, if the plasma concentration of the "free met-hemoglobin" and/or "free hemoglobin" is still too high for proximal tubule to absorb back into the body, then hemoglobinuria occurs, indicating an extensive intravascular hemolysis. These remaining free hemoglobin entities also begin to consume nitric oxide, which is a critical regulator of vascular homeostasis, basal and stress-mediated smooth muscle relaxation and vasomotor tone, endothelial adhesion molecule expression, and platelet activation and aggregation. The reduction of nitric oxide deeply disturbs the body's mechanism to maintain the stability of the hemodynamics. Additionally, free hemoglobin manifests direct cytotoxic, inflammatory, and pro-oxidant effects that in turn negatively impact endothelial function. In the meantime, free heme exerts its multiple pro-inflammatory and pro-oxidant effects to the tissues it goes through.

Although hemosiderins are also included in the urine in the setting of intravascular hemolytic hemoglobinuria, they will be detected only several days after the onset of the extensive intravascular hemolysis and will remain detectable several days after termination of intravascular hemolysis. Thus, the detection of hemosiderin in urine is indicative of either ongoing or recent intravascular hemolysis characterized by excessive hemoglobin and/or met-hemoglobin filtered through the renal glomerulus as well as the loss of hemosiderin-laden necrotic tubular cells.

== See also ==
- Extravascular hemolysis
