= Cullen's sign =

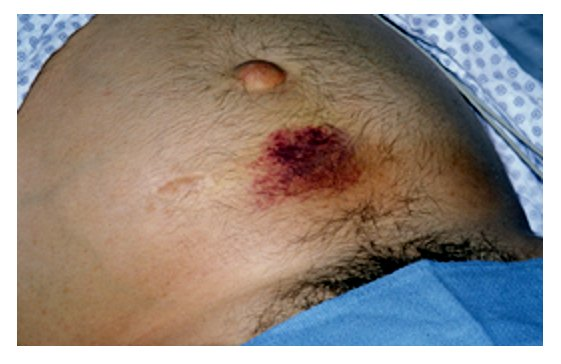
- Specialty: Various

Cullen's sign, also known as umbilical black eye, is superficial edema and bruising in the subcutaneous fatty tissue around the umbilicus. It is also known as peri-umbilical ecchymosis.

It is named for gynecologist Thomas Stephen Cullen (1869–1953), who first described the sign in ruptured ectopic pregnancy in 1916.

The finding of Cullen's sign may indicate intra-peritoneal or retroperitoneal hemorrhage. The signs and symptoms include bruising/ecchymosis around the umbilicus and can also include swelling and abdominal pain.

This sign takes 24–48 hours to appear and can predict acute pancreatitis, with mortality rising from 8–10% to 40%. It may be accompanied by Grey Turner's sign (bruising of the flank), which may then be indicative of pancreatic necrosis with retroperitoneal or intra-abdominal bleeding. With such an elevation in mortality once this physical exam finding is discovered, it is crucial to initiate management quickly.

== Pathophysiology ==
Cullen's sign occurs due to accumulation of blood within the retroperitoneum that builds up along the falciform ligament as well as the gastrohepatic ligament. The color of the bruising around the umbilicus can be an indication of the severity of the bleeding, with lighter, less prominent discoloration indicating less severe bleeding and darker, purple bruising indicating a deeper, more severe underlying condition. This difference in blood discoloration is due to the timeframe in which breakdown of red blood cells occurs. An alternative mechanism discussed for the difference in blood discoloration has been from the activation of the pancreatic enzymes.

== Causes ==
Cullen's sign has an exhaustive list of causes, with some including:

- acute pancreatitis, where methemalbumin formed from digested blood tracks around the abdomen from the inflamed pancreas
- bleeding from blunt abdominal trauma
- bleeding from aortic rupture
- bleeding from ruptured ectopic pregnancy
- bleeding from perforated duodenal ulcer
- bleeding from ruptured spleen
- bleeding from metastatic cancer
- bleeding from ruptured common bile duct
- rectus sheath hematoma
- massive ovarian enlargement
- bleeding from amoebic liver abscess
- complication of anti-coagulation

Importance of the sign is on a decline since better diagnostic modalities are now available.

== History ==
Cullen’s Sign was named after Thomas Stephen Cullen, a Canadian gynecologist who researched gynecological diseases such as uterine cancer and ectopic pregnancy. He first described Cullen’s sign in 1918 after a case of a ruptured ectopic pregnancy.

== How pancreatitis causes Cullen's sign ==
Pancreatitis is described as inflammation of the pancreas, usually caused by increased activation of pancreatic enzymes causing auto-digestion. The proceeding damage caused to the pancreas can result in hemorrhage into the peritoneum.

Notably, Cullen's sign may co-exist with the Grey Turner's sign, which is described as a subcutaneous manifestation of intra-abdominal hemorrhage that appears as bruising or discoloration in the flank. This can also be an indication of pancreatic necrosis with intra-peritoneal or retroperitoneal hemorrhage. Cullen's sign and Grey Turner's sign are seen in <1% of individuals with acute pancreatitis and provide a poor prognosis once seen.

== Treatment ==
For hemodynamically unstable patients requiring resuscitation, one can:

- Establish IV access and begin fluid resuscitation with normal saline
- Resuscitate with blood products if concerned for hemorrhage
  - If patient is actively bleeding and has hemodynamic instability
  - Hemoglobin <10g/dl in the setting of acute bleeding
- Perform a point-of-care ultrasound to evaluate for an abdominal aortic aneurysm or intra-peritoneal bleeding
- Monitor urine output
- Monitor volume status

Treatment can be additionally determined by the underlying cause:

- Acute pancreatitis
- Bleeding, such as hemorrhagic complications
- Ectopic pregnancy
- Bleeding from aortic rupture
