= Grey Turner's sign =

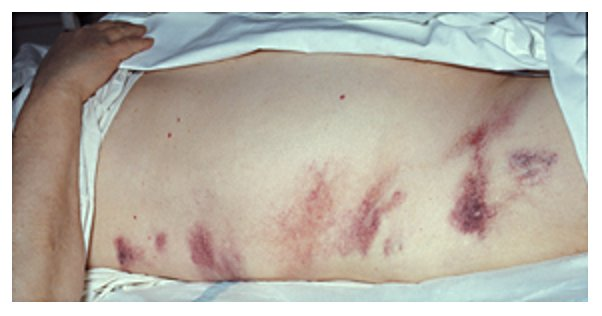
- Grey Turner's sign
- Differential diagnosis: Acute pancreatitis, ectopic pregnancy

Grey Turner's sign refers to bruising of the flanks, the part of the body between the last rib and the top of the hip. The bruising appears as a blue discoloration, and is a sign of retroperitoneal hemorrhage, or bleeding behind the peritoneum, which is a lining of the abdominal cavity. Grey Turner's sign takes 24–48 hours to develop, and can predict a severe attack of acute pancreatitis.

Grey Turner's sign may occur when there is retroperitoneal hemorrhage or intramural bleeding that moves through fascial planes to the subcutaneous areas of the flanks which causes discoloration of the skin. This is commonly associated with severe intra-abdominal pathology such as severe acute pancreatitis. In acute pancreatitis, it can correlate with greater severity, more extensive retroperitoneal hemorrhage and worse prognosis.

Grey Turner's sign may be accompanied by Cullen's sign. Both signs may be indicative of pancreatic necrosis with retroperitoneal or intra-abdominal bleeding.

It may also be associated with a variety of other severe intra-abdominal conditions such as, ruptured abdominal aortic aneurysm, ruptured ectopic pregnancy, and peri-renal hematoma. Spontaneous abdominal wall hemorrhages caused by increased intra-abdominal pressure from severe coughing or other inciting events can potentially cause this sign. On visualization, it should prompt urgent evaluation for any possible causes of retroperitoneal bleeding sources. Recognition of this finding can be helpful to prevent unnecessary delay in diagnosis of an underlying cause of this unique hemorrhagic sign. This finding may also represent the need for more intensive care monitoring in severe clinical presentations.

Grey Turner's sign is named after British surgeon George Grey Turner.

== Causes ==
Causes include

- Acute pancreatitis, whereby methemalbumin formed from digested blood tracks subcutaneously around the abdomen from the inflamed pancreas.
- Pancreatic hemorrhage
- Retroperitoneal hemorrhage
- Blunt abdominal trauma
- Ruptured / hemorrhagic ectopic pregnancy.
- Spontaneous bleeding secondary to coagulopathy (congenital or acquired)
- Aortic rupture, from ruptured abdominal aortic aneurysm or other causes.

== History ==
It is named after British surgeon George Grey Turner.
