= Schumm test =

Test for blood mismatch

- Purpose: levels of methemalbumin in blood.

The Schumm test (shoom) is a blood test that uses spectroscopy to determine significant levels of methemalbumin in the blood. A positive result could indicate intravascular hemolysis. The Schumm test was named for Otto Schumm, a German chemist who lived in the early 20th century.

A positive test result occurs when the haptoglobin binding capacity of the blood is saturated, leading to heme released from cell free hemoglobin to bind to albumin.
