= Malarial nephropathy =

- Specialty: Nephrology

Malarial nephropathy is kidney failure attributed to malarial infection. Among various complications due to infection, renal-related disorders are often the most life-threatening. Including malaria-induced renal lesions, infection may lead to both tubulointerstitial damage and glomerulonephritis. In addition, malarial acute kidney failure has emerged as a serious problem due to its high mortality rate in non-immune adult patients.

== Mechanism ==
Due to the complex malarial syndrome, there are many pathogenic interactions leading to acute renal failure, such as hypovolemia, intravascular hemolysis and disseminated intravascular coagulation. Malarial acute renal failure prevents the kidneys from efficiently removing excess fluid, electrolytes and waste material from the blood. The accumulation of these fluids and material will cause adverse consequences for the patient including, electrolyte abnormality and increased urinary protein excretion.

== Treatment ==
Untreated patients often face a large number of physical complications, but early diagnosis and effective treatment can reduce the high risk of mortality in patients. A three-pronged approach against infection is regularly needed for successful treatment. antimalarial drug therapy (e.g., artemisinin derivatives), fluid replacement (e.g., oral rehydration therapy), and if needed, renal replacement therapy.

== Epidemiology ==
Malarial nephropathies are reported in endemic areas, such as Southeast Asia, India, and Sub-Saharan Africa. The pathogenesis of acute kidney injury in severe malaria is unspecific and multifactorial—it affects fewer than 4.8 percent of cases, but reports a high risk of mortality (15 to 45 percent). Histologic evidence shows a large combination of pathogenic mechanisms at play—acute tubular necrosis, interstitial nephritis and glomerulonephritis. Risk factors for malarial acute kidney injury include delayed diagnosis, high parasitemia, and clinical presentation of oliguria, low blood pressure, severe anemia, and jaundice. In addition, patients already suffering from diarrhea, hepatitis, or respiratory distress have a worse prognosis.
