= Ranson criteria =

- Purpose: assess mortality risk of acute pancreatitis

The Ranson criteria form a clinical prediction rule for predicting the prognosis and mortality risk of acute pancreatitis. They were introduced in 1974 by the English-American pancreatic expert and surgeon Dr. John Ranson (1938–1995).

== Usage ==
A score of 3 or more indicates severe acute pancreatitis. This can cause organ failure, necrosis, infected necrosis, pseudocyst, and abscess. If diagnosed with severe acute pancreatitis, people will need to be admitted to a high-dependency unit or intensive care unit.

=== Acute pancreatitis not secondary to gallstones ===
At admission:

1. Blood glucose > 11.11 mmol/L (> 200 mg/dL)
2. Age > 55 years
3. Serum LDH > 350 IU/L
4. Serum AST > 250 IU/L
5. WBC count > 16000 cells/mm^{3}

Within 48 hours:

1. Serum calcium < 2.0 mmol/L (< 8.0 mg/dL)
2. Hematocrit decreased by > 10%
3. Oxygen (hypoxemia with PaO_{2} < 60 mmHg)
4. BUN increased by 1.8 or more mmol/L (5 or more mg/dL) after IV fluid hydration
5. Base deficit (negative base excess) > 4 mEq/L
6. Sequestration of fluids > 6 L

=== Acute pancreatitis secondary to gallstones ===
At admission:

1. Glucose > 220 mg/dl
2. Age > 70 years
3. LDH > 400 IU/L
4. AST > 250 IU/ 100 ml
5. WBC count > 18000 cells/mm^{3}

Within 48 hours:

1. Serum calcium < 8 mg/dL
2. Hematocrit decreased by > 10%
3. Base deficit > 4 mEq/L
4. BUN increased by > 2 mg/dL
5. Sequestered fluid > 4L

== Alternatives ==
Alternatively, pancreatitis severity can be assessed by any of the following:

- APACHE II score ≥ 8
- Balthazar computed tomography severity index (CTSI)
- BISAP score
- Organ failure
- Substantial pancreatic necrosis (at least 30% glandular necrosis according to contrast-enhanced CT)
- Modified Glasgow Criteria

== Interpretation ==
- If the score ≥ 3, severe pancreatitis likely.
- If the score < 3, severe pancreatitis is unlikely

Or

- Score 0 to 2 : 2% mortality
- Score 3 to 4 : 15% mortality
- Score 5 to 6 : 40% mortality
- Score 7 to 8 : 100% mortality
