= Acute pancreatitis =

- Other names: Acute pancreatic necrosis
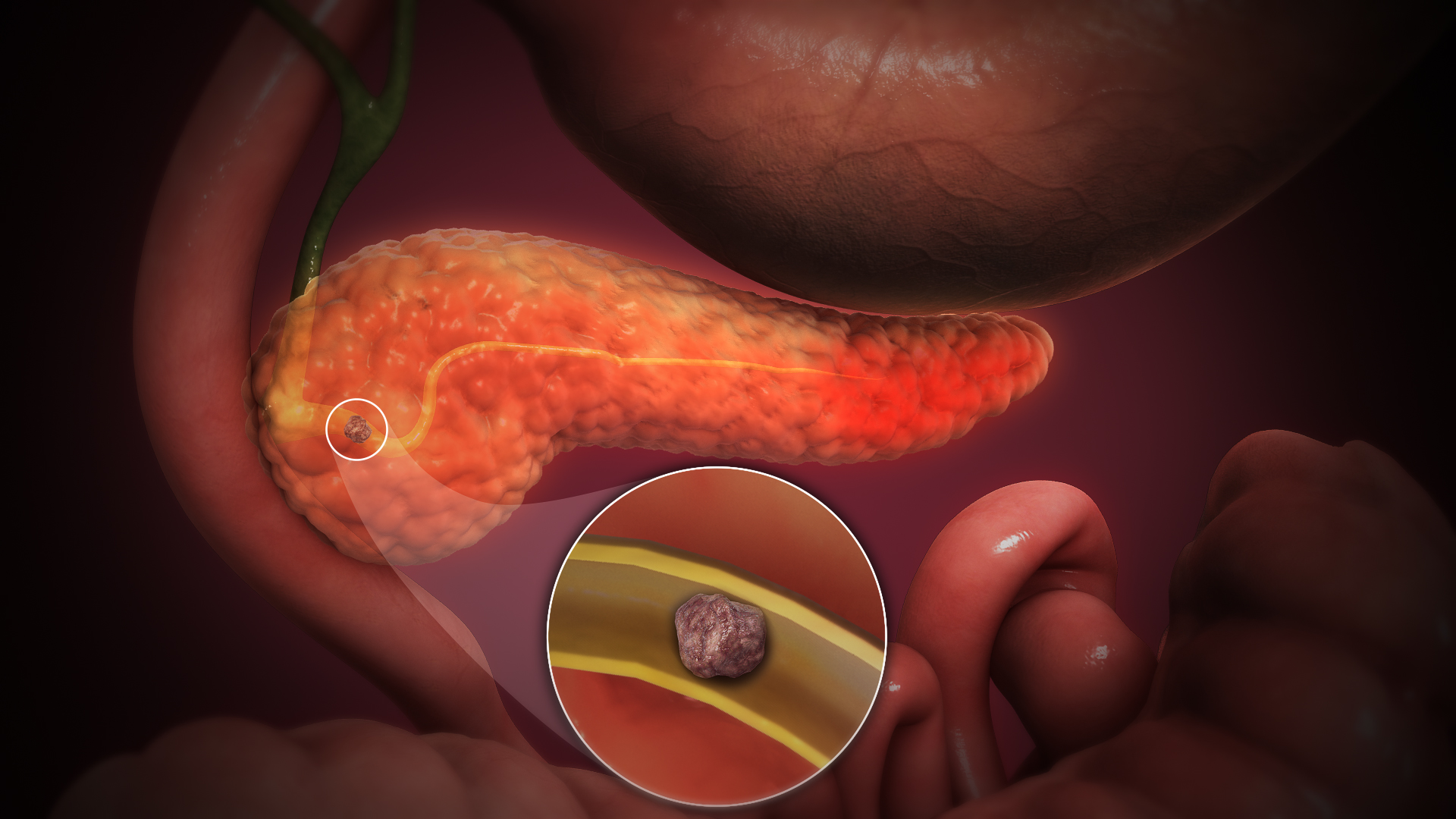
- Still from 3D medical animation of acute pancreatitis
- Specialty: Gastroenterology, general surgery

Acute pancreatitis (AP) is a sudden inflammation of the pancreas. Causes include a gallstone impacted in the common bile duct or the pancreatic duct, heavy alcohol use, systemic disease, trauma, elevated calcium levels, hypertriglyceridemia (with triglycerides usually being very elevated, over 1000 mg/dL), certain medications, hereditary causes and, in children, mumps. Acute pancreatitis may be a single event, it may be recurrent, or it may progress to chronic pancreatitis and/or pancreatic failure (the term pancreatic dysfunction includes cases of acute or chronic pancreatitis where the pancreas is measurably damaged, even if it has not failed).

In all cases of acute pancreatitis, early intravenous fluid hydration and early enteral (nutrition delivered to the gut, either by mouth or via a feeding tube) feeding are associated with lower mortality and complications. Mild cases are usually successfully treated with conservative measures such as hospitalization with intravenous fluid infusion, pain control, and early enteral feeding. If a person is not able to tolerate feeding by mouth, feeding via nasogastric or nasojejunal tubes are frequently used which provide nutrition directly to the stomach or intestines respectively.

Severe cases often require admission to an intensive care unit. Severe pancreatitis, which by definition includes organ damage other than the pancreas, has a mortality rate of 20%. The condition is characterized by the pancreas secreting active enzymes such as trypsin, chymotrypsin and carboxypeptidase, instead of their inactive forms, leading to auto-digestion of the pancreas. Calcium helps to convert trypsinogen to the active trypsin, thus elevated calcium (of any cause) is a potential cause of pancreatitis. Damage to the pancreatic ducts can occur as a result of this. Long term complications include type 3c diabetes (pancreatogenic diabetes), in which the pancreas is unable to secrete enough insulin due to structural damage. 35% develop exocrine pancreatic insufficiency in which the pancreas is unable to secrete digestive enzymes due to structural damage, leading to malabsorption.

== Signs and symptoms ==
=== Common ===
Common symptoms of acute pancreatitis include abdominal pain, nausea, vomiting, and low to moderate grade fever. The abdominal pain is the most common symptom and it is usually described as being in the left upper quadrant, epigastric area or around the umbilicus, with radiation throughout the abdomen, or to the chest or back. The abdominal pain initially may worsen with eating or drinking but may become constant as the disease progresses. Less common symptoms include hiccups, abdominal bloating and indigestion. Although these are common symptoms, frequently they are not all present; and epigastric pain may be the only symptom.

Grey-Turner's sign (hemorrhagic discoloration of the flanks) or Cullen's sign (hemorrhagic discoloration of the umbilicus) are associated with severe disease. However both signs are rare (occurring in less than 1% of cases of acute pancreatitis) and are not specific nor sensitive for diagnosis of acute pancreatitis. Pleural effusions (fluid in the lung cavity) may occur in up to 34% of people with acute pancreatitis and are associated with a poor prognosis. The Mayo-Robson's sign (pain while pressing at the top of the angle lateral to the erector spinae muscles and below the left 12th rib (left costovertebral angle (CVA)) is also associated with acute pancreatitis.

=== Complications ===
Complications of acute pancreatitis may occur. Necrotic pancreatitis occurs when inflammation of the pancreas progresses to cell death. Acute fluid collections may form adjacent to the pancreas or necrotic collections (discrete areas of dead tissue) may also form adjacent to or within the pancreas. These may progress to pancreatic pseudocysts and walled off areas of dead tissue which may persist for longer than 4 weeks. Both can become secondarily infected. Other complications include gastric outlet obstruction, splenic artery pseudoaneurysms, hemorrhage from erosions into splenic artery and vein, blood clot of the splenic vein, superior mesenteric vein and portal veins, duodenal obstruction, common bile duct obstruction, progression to chronic pancreatitis, pancreatic ascites, or pleural effusion.

Systemic complications include acute respiratory distress syndrome (ARDS), multiple organ dysfunction syndrome, disseminated intravascular coagulation (DIC), hypocalcemia (from fat saponification), hyperglycemia and insulin dependent diabetes mellitus (from pancreatic insulin-producing beta cell damage), and malabsorption due to exocrine failure.

Tobacco use, recurrent episodes of acute pancreatitis, pancreatic tissue death, alcoholic pancreatitis are all risk factors for developing chronic pancreatitis.

== Causes ==
=== Most common ===
- Biliary pancreatitis due to gallstones or constriction of ampulla of Vater in 40% of cases
- Alcohol in 30% of cases
- Idiopathic in 15–25% of cases
- Metabolic disorders: hereditary pancreatitis, hypercalcemia, elevated triglycerides, malnutrition
- May occur after instrumentation of the pancreatic duct or its opening to the duodenum (ampula of Vater) in procedures such as an endoscopic ultrasound or endoscopic retrograde cholangiopancreatography (ERCP). The risk after EUS is less than 1% and the risk after ERCP is 5-10%.
- Abdominal trauma
- Penetrating ulcers
- Carcinoma of the head of pancreas, and other cancer
- Drugs: acetaminophen with or without codeine, amiodarone, azathioprine, carbamazepine, cimetidine, cisplatin, clomiphene, enalapril, estrogen containing products or hormones, furosemide, isoniazid, metronidazole, methyldopa, pravastatin, valproic acid
- Infections: mumps, viral hepatitis, coxsackie B virus, cytomegalovirus, Mycoplasma pneumoniae, Ascaris
- Structural abnormalities: pancreas divisum, pancreatic masses or cysts that block the ducts.
- Radiotherapy
- Autoimmune pancreatitis
- Severe hypertriglyceridemia

=== Less common ===
- Scorpion venom
- Chinese liver fluke
- Ischemia from bypass surgery
- Heart valve surgery
- Fat necrosis
- Pregnancy
- Infections other than mumps, including varicella zoster
- Hyperparathyroidism
- Cystic fibrosis
- Anorexia or bulimia

== Pathology ==
Anatomy of the pancreas

=== Pathogenesis ===
Acute pancreatitis occurs when there is abnormal activation of digestive enzymes within the pancreas. These enzymes are usually stored in an inactive (zymogen) form inside pancreatic acinar cells to prevent self-digestion. In acute pancreatitis, some of these inactive enzyme get activated prematurely, most notably trypsinogen. Normally, trypsinogen is converted to its active form (trypsin) in the first part of the small intestine (duodenum), where the enzyme assists in the digestion of proteins. During an episode of acute pancreatitis, trypsinogen comes into contact with lysosomal enzymes (specifically cathepsin), which activate trypsinogen to trypsin. The active form trypsin then leads to further activation of other molecules of trypsinogen. The activation of these digestive enzymes lead to inflammation, edema, vascular injury, and even cellular death. The death of pancreatic cells occurs via two main mechanisms: apoptosis, which is physiologically controlled, and necrosis, which is less organized and more damaging. The balance between these two mechanisms of cellular death is mediated by caspases which regulate apoptosis and have important anti-necrosis functions during pancreatitis: preventing trypsinogen activation, preventing ATP depletion through inhibiting polyADP-ribose polymerase, and by inhibiting the inhibitors of apoptosis (IAPs). If, however, the caspases are depleted due to either chronic ethanol exposure or through a severe insult then necrosis can predominate.

=== Pathophysiology ===
The two types of acute pancreatitis are mild and severe, which are defined based on whether the predominant response to cell injury is inflammation (mild) or necrosis (severe). In mild pancreatitis, there is inflammation and edema of the pancreas. In severe pancreatitis, there is necrosis of the pancreas, and nearby organs may become injured.

As part of the initial injury there is an extensive inflammatory response due to pancreatic cells synthesizing and secreting inflammatory mediators: primarily TNF-alpha and IL-1. A hallmark of acute pancreatitis is a manifestation of the inflammatory response, namely the recruitment of neutrophils to the pancreas. The inflammatory response leads to the secondary manifestations of pancreatitis: hypovolemia from capillary permeability, acute respiratory distress syndrome, disseminated intravascular coagulations, renal failure, cardiovascular failure, and gastrointestinal hemorrhage.

=== Histopathology ===
The acute pancreatitis (acute hemorrhagic pancreatic necrosis) is characterized by acute inflammation and necrosis of pancreas parenchyma, focal enzymic necrosis of pancreatic fat and vessel necrosis (hemorrhage). These are produced by intrapancreatic activation of pancreatic enzymes. Lipase activation produces the necrosis of fat tissue in pancreatic interstitium and peripancreatic spaces as well as vessel damage. Necrotic fat cells appear as shadows, contours of cells, lacking the nucleus, pink, finely granular cytoplasm. It is possible to find calcium precipitates (hematoxylinophilic). Digestion of vascular walls results in thrombosis and hemorrhage. Inflammatory infiltrate is rich in neutrophils. Due to the pancreas lacking a capsule, the inflammation and necrosis can extend to include fascial layers in the immediate vicinity of the pancreas.

== Diagnosis ==
Acute pancreatitis is diagnosed using clinical history and physical examination findings supporting the diagnosis with imaging and pancreatic enzymes (amylase and lipase). The Revised Atlanta Classification requires two out of three of the following findings for the diagnosis: abdominal pain consistent with pancreatitis, elevated amylase or lipase levels greater than 3 times the upper limit of normal, and imaging consistent with acute pancreatitis. Additional labs may be used to identify organ failure for prognostic purposes or to guide fluid resuscitation rate. If the lipase level is about 2.5 to 3 times that of amylase, it is an indication of pancreatitis due to alcohol. Serum lipase is more sensitive and specific than serum amylase in the diagnosis of acute pancreatitis, and is the preferred test in the diagnosis.

Most, but not all individual studies support favor the diagnostic utility of lipase. In one large study, there were no patients with pancreatitis who had an elevated amylase with a normal lipase. Another study found that the amylase could add diagnostic value to the lipase, but only if the results of the two tests were combined with a discriminant function equation.

Reduced lipase clearance due to kidney disease, gastrointestinal or hepatobiliary cancers, pancreatic enzyme hypersecretion, critical illness including due to neurosurgical causes have been shown to increase serum lipase and may complicate the diagnosis of acute pancreatitis.

=== Differential diagnosis ===
The differential diagnosis includes:

- Perforated peptic ulcer
- Biliary colic
- Acute cholecystitis
- Pneumonia
- Pleuritic pain
- Myocardial infarction

=== Computed tomography ===
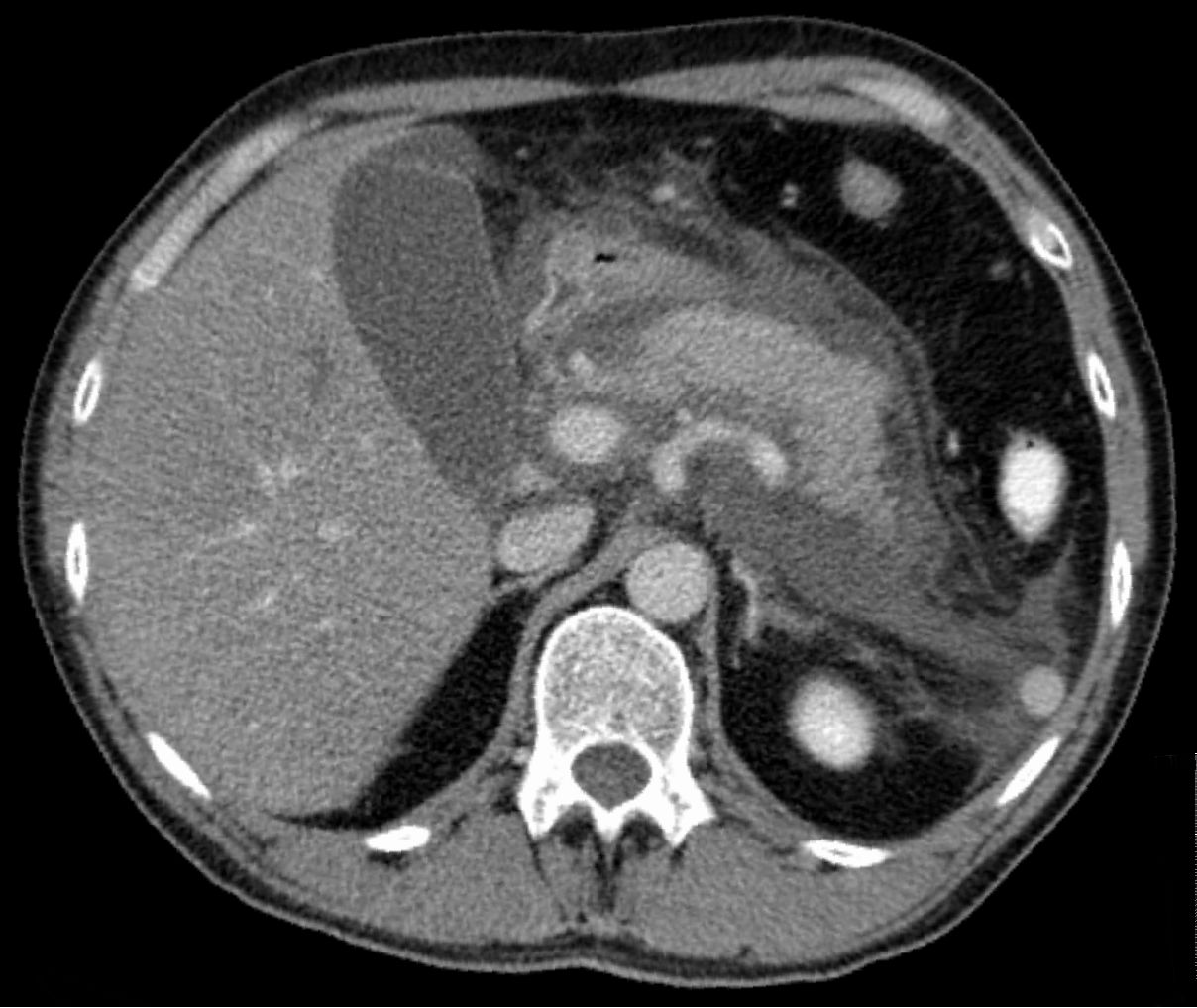
Axial CT in a patient with acute exudative pancreatitis showing extensive fluid collections surrounding the pancreas

Regarding the need for computed tomography, practice guidelines state:

CT is an important common initial assessment tool for acute pancreatitis. Imaging is indicated during the initial presentation if:

- the diagnosis of acute pancreatitis is uncertain
- there is abdominal distension and tenderness, fever >102 F (38,9 C), or leukocytosis
- there is a Ranson score > 3 or APACHE score > 8
- there is no improvement after 72 hours of conservative medical therapy
- there has been an acute change in status: fever, pain, or shock

CT is recommended as a delayed assessment tool in the following situations:

- acute change in status
- to determine therapeutic response after surgery or interventional radiologic procedure
- before discharge in patients with severe acute pancreatitis

Abdominal CT should not be performed before the first 12 hours of onset of symptoms as early CT (<12 hours) may result in equivocal or normal findings.

CT findings can be classified into the following categories for easy recall:

- Intrapancreatic – diffuse or segmental enlargement, edema, gas bubbles, pancreatic pseudocysts and phlegmons/abscesses (which present 4 to 6 wks after initial onset)
- Peripancreatic / extrapancreatic – irregular pancreatic outline, obliterated peripancreatic fat, retroperitoneal edema, fluid in the lessar sac, fluid in the left anterior pararenal space
- Locoregional – Gerota's fascia sign (thickening of inflamed Gerota's fascia, which becomes visible), pancreatic ascites, pleural effusion (seen on basal cuts of the pleural cavity), adynamic ileus, etc.

The principal value of CT imaging to the treating clinician is the capacity to identify devitalized areas of the pancreas which have become necrotic due to ischaemia. Pancreatic necrosis can be reliably identified by intravenous contrast-enhanced CT imaging, and is of value if infection occurs and surgical or percutaneous debridement is indicated.

=== Magnetic resonance imaging ===
While computed tomography is considered the gold standard in diagnostic imaging for acute pancreatitis, magnetic resonance imaging (MRI) has become increasingly valuable as a tool for the visualization of the pancreas, particularly of pancreatic fluid collections and necrotized debris. Additional utility of MRI includes its indication for imaging of patients with an allergy to CT's contrast material, and an overall greater sensitivity to hemorrhage, vascular complications, pseudoaneurysms, and venous thrombosis.

Another advantage of MRI is its utilization of magnetic resonance cholangiopancreatography (MRCP) sequences. MRCP provides useful information regarding the etiology of acute pancreatitis, i.e., the presence of tiny biliary stones (choledocholithiasis or cholelithiasis) and duct anomalies. Clinical trials indicate that MRCP can be as effective a diagnostic tool for acute pancreatitis with biliary etiology as endoscopic retrograde cholangiopancreatography, but with the benefits of being less invasive and causing fewer complications.

=== Ultrasound ===
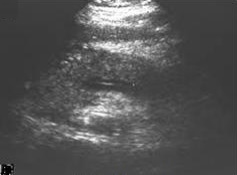
Abdominal ultrasonography of acute pancreatitis

Ultrasound is less preferred as a diagnostic test for acute pancreatitis, but it may be used in select cases. Abdominal ultrasonography may be obtained if there is concern of a gallstone blocking the pancreatic duct leading to pancreatitis.

== Treatment ==
Early enteral (nutrition given directly to the gut, either by mouth or via feeding tube) nutrition and aggressive intravenous fluid hydration are indicated in all forms and severities of acute pancreatitis and are associated with lower mortality and complications.

=== Fluid replacement ===
The specific rate of intravenous fluid replacement in acute pancreatitis is not well established but some experts recommend an initial fluid infusion rate of 5–10 mL of IV fluids per kilogram of body weight per hour and adjusting the rate to meet physiologic parameters such as heart rate, mean arterial pressure, urine output and hematocrit.

Isotonic crystalloid solutions (such as lactated ringers) are preferred over normal saline for fluid resuscitation and are associated with a lower risk of developing systemic inflammatory response syndrome (SIRS).

In the initial stages (within the first 12 to 24 hours) of acute pancreatitis, fluid replacement has been associated with a reduction in morbidity and mortality.

=== Pain control ===
Abdominal pain is often the predominant symptom in patients with acute pancreatitis and should be treated with analgesics.

Opioids are safe and effective at providing pain control in patients with acute pancreatitis. Adequate pain control requires the use of intravenous opiates, usually in the form of a patient-controlled analgesia pump. Hydromorphone or fentanyl (intravenous) may be used for pain relief in acute pancreatitis. Fentanyl is being increasingly used due to its better safety profile, especially in renal impairment. As with other opiates, fentanyl can depress respiratory function. It can be given both as a bolus as well as constant infusion. Meperidine has been historically favored over morphine because of the belief that morphine caused an increase in sphincter of Oddi pressure. However, no clinical studies suggest that morphine can aggravate or cause pancreatitis or cholecystitis. In addition, meperidine has a short half-life and repeated doses can lead to accumulation of the metabolite normeperidine, which causes neuromuscular side effects and, rarely, seizures.

=== Nutritional support ===
Acute pancreatitis is a catabolic state and with hemodynamic instability or fluid shifts or edema there may be reduced intravascular perfusion to the gut. This reduction in gut perfusion increases the risk of gut necrosis with bacterial translocation with the subsequent risk of sepsis or secondary infections. Enteral nutrition gives one needed caloric intake as well as enhances intestinal motility and blood flow to the gut, reducing these risks. Enteral nutrition (as compared to parenteral nutrition, in which nutrients are given via intravenous infusion) is associated with reduced mortality, reduced risk of multi-organ failure and systemic infection in those with acute pancreatitis. In patients with acute pancreatitis, the American Gastroenterological Association (AGA) recommends early oral nutrition, within 24 hours, rather than keeping the patient fasting (or nil by mouth). And in those unable to feed orally, the AGA recommends enteral nutrition (via a nasogastric or nasojejunal tube) rather than parenteral nutrition.

=== Antibiotics ===
Up to 20 percent of people with acute pancreatitis develop an infection outside the pancreas such as bloodstream infections, pneumonia, or urinary tract infections. These infections are associated with an increase in mortality. Fluid collections around the pancreas or areas within the pancreas that experience tissue death (necrosis) may also become secondarily infected requiring the use of antibiotics. When an infection is suspected, antibiotics should be started while the source of the infection is being determined. However, if cultures are negative and no source of infection is identified, antibiotics should be discontinued.

Preventative antibiotics are not recommended in people with acute pancreatitis, regardless of the type (interstitial or necrotizing) or disease severity (mild, moderately severe, or severe)

=== Endoscopic retrograde cholangiopancreatography ===
In 30% of those with acute pancreatitis, no cause is identified. Endoscopic retrograde cholangiopancreatography (ERCP) with empirical biliary sphincterotomy has an equal chance of causing complications and treating the underlying cause, therefore, is not recommended for treating acute pancreatitis. If a gallstone is detected, ERCP, performed within 24 to 72 hours of presentation with successful removal of the stone, is known to reduce morbidity and mortality. The indications for early ERCP are:

- Clinical deterioration or lack of improvement after 24 hours
- Detection of common bile duct stones or dilated intrahepatic or extrahepatic ducts on abdominal CT

The risks of ERCP are that it may worsen pancreatitis, it may introduce an infection to otherwise sterile pancreatitis, and bleeding.

=== Surgery ===
In those with mild acute pancreatitis due to gallstones, cholecystectomy (removal of the gallbladder) is recommended in the hospital and is associated with a reduced risk of pancreatitis recurrence. In those with gallstone pancreatitis who have severe disease, including the presence of peripancreatic fluid collections, cholecystectomy should be delayed as the fluid collections around the pancreas make surgery technically difficult. The peri-pancreatic fluids also carry a risk of becoming secondarily infected with surgery.

Surgery is indicated for (i) infected pancreatic necrosis and (ii) diagnostic uncertainty and (iii) complications. The most common cause of death in acute pancreatitis is secondary infection. Infection is diagnosed based on 2 criteria

- Gas bubbles on CT scan (present in 20 to 50% of infected necrosis)
- Positive bacterial culture on FNA (fine needle aspiration, usually CT or US guided) of the pancreas.

Surgical options for infected necrosis include:

- Minimally invasive management – necrosectomy through small incision in skin (left flank) or abdomen
- Conventional management – necrosectomy with simple drainage
- Closed management – necrosectomy with closed continuous postoperative lavage
- Open management – necrosectomy with planned staged reoperations at definite intervals (up to 20+ reoperations in some cases)

=== Other measures ===
- Pancreatic enzyme inhibitors are proven not to work.
- The use of octreotide has been shown not to improve outcomes.

== Classification by severity: prognostic scoring systems ==
Acute pancreatitis patients recover in majority of cases. Some may develop abscess, pseudocyst or duodenal obstruction. About 20% of the acute pancreatitis are severe with a mortality of about 20%. Acute pancreatitis can be further divided into mild and severe pancreatitis. Several clinical scoring tools have been developed to determine prognostic information and may guide certain areas of clinical management, such as need for ICU admission.

Two such scoring systems are the Ranson criteria and APACHE II (Acute Physiology and Chronic Health Evaluation) indices. Most, but not all studies report that the Apache score may be more accurate. In the negative study of the APACHE-II, the APACHE-II 24-hour score was used rather than the 48-hour score. Some experts recommend using the APACHE II score as well as a serum hematocrit level early during the admission as prognostic indicators.

=== Ranson score ===
The Ranson score is used to predict the severity of acute pancreatitis. They were introduced in 1974.

==== At admission ====
- age in years > 55 years
- white blood cell count > 16000 cells/mm3
- blood glucose > 11.1 mmol/L (> 200 mg/dL)
- serum AST > 250 IU/L
- serum LDH > 350 IU/L

==== At 48 hours ====
- Calcium (serum calcium < 2.0 mmol/L (< 8.0 mg/dL))
- Hematocrit fall >10%
- Oxygen (hypoxemia PO2 < 60 mmHg)
- BUN increased by 1.8 or more mmol/L (5 or more mg/dL) after IV fluid hydration
- Base deficit (negative base excess) > 4 mEq/L
- Sequestration of fluids > 6 L

The criteria for point assignment is that a certain breakpoint be met at any time during that 48 hour period, so that in some situations it can be calculated shortly after admission. It is applicable to both gallstone and alcoholic pancreatitis.

Alternatively, pancreatitis can be diagnosed by meeting any of the following:[2]

=== Alternative Ranson score ===
Ranson's score of ≥ 8 Organ failure Substantial pancreatic necrosis (at least 30% glandular necrosis according to contrast-enhanced CT)

Interpretation If the score ≥ 3, severe pancreatitis likely. If the score < 3, severe pancreatitis is unlikely Or

Score 0 to 2 : 2% mortality Score 3 to 4 : 15% mortality Score 5 to 6 : 40% mortality Score 7 to 8 : 100% mortality

=== APACHE II score ===
"Acute Physiology And Chronic Health Evaluation" (APACHE II) score > 8 points predicts 11% to 18% mortality

- Hemorrhagic peritoneal fluid
- Obesity
- Indicators of organ failure
- Hypotension (SBP <90 mmHG) or tachycardia > 130 beat/min
- PO_{2} <60 mmHg
- Oliguria (<50 mL/h) or increasing BUN and creatinine
- Serum calcium < 1.90 mmol/L (<8.0 mg/dL) or serum albumin <33 g/L (<3.2.g/dL)>

=== Balthazar score ===
Developed in the early 1990s by Emil J. Balthazar et al., the Computed Tomography Severity Index (CTSI) is a grading system used to determine the severity of acute pancreatitis. The numerical CTSI has a maximum of ten points, and is the sum of the Balthazar grade points and pancreatic necrosis grade points:

Balthazar grade

Balthazar grade	Appearance on CT	CT grade points
Grade A	Normal CT	0 points
Grade B	Focal or diffuse enlargement of the pancreas	1 point
Grade C	Pancreatic gland abnormalities and peripancreatic inflammation	2 points
Grade D	Fluid collection in a single location	3 points
Grade E	Two or more fluid collections and / or gas bubbles in or adjacent to pancreas	4 points

Necrosis score

Necrosis percentage	Points
No necrosis	0 points
0 to 30% necrosis	2 points
30 to 50% necrosis	4 points
Over 50% necrosis	6 points

CTSI's staging of acute pancreatitis severity has been shown by a number of studies to provide more accurate assessment than APACHE II, Ranson, and C-reactive protein (CRP) level. However, a few studies indicate that CTSI is not significantly associated with the prognosis of hospitalization in patients with pancreatic necrosis, nor is it an accurate predictor of AP severity.

=== Glasgow score ===
The Glasgow score is valid for both gallstone and alcohol induced pancreatitis, whereas the Ranson score is only for alcohol induced pancreatitis. If a patient scores 3 or more it indicates severe pancreatitis and the patient should be considered for transfer to ITU. It is scored through the mnemonic, PANCREAS:

- P – PaO2 <8kPa
- A – Age >55-years-old
- N – Neutrophilia: WCC >15x10(9)/L
- C – Calcium <2 mmol/L
- R – Renal function: Urea >16 mmol/L
- E – Enzymes: LDH >600iu/L; AST >200iu/L
- A – Albumin <32g/L (serum)
- S – Sugar: blood glucose >10 mmol/L

=== BISAP score ===
Predicts mortality risk in pancreatitis with fewer variables than Ranson's criteria. Data should be taken from the first 24 hours of the patient's evaluation.

- BUN >25 mg/dL (8.9 mmol/L)
- Abnormal mental status with a Glasgow coma score <15
- Evidence of SIRS (systemic inflammatory response syndrome)
- Patient age >60 years old
- Imaging study reveals pleural effusion

Patients with a score of zero had a mortality of less than one percent, whereas patients with a score of five had a mortality rate of 22 percent. In the validation cohort, the BISAP score had similar test performance characteristics for predicting mortality as the APACHE II score. As is a problem with many of the other scoring systems, the BISAP has not been validated for predicting outcomes such as length of hospital stay, need for ICU care, or need for intervention.

== Epidemiology ==
The worldwide incidence of acute pancreatitis increased from 1961 to 2016 with an average annual percentage increase of 3%, with increased incidence seen in North America and Europe. The incidence of acute pancreatitis in the United States is 110–140 cases per 100,000 people.

In the United States the most common causes include gallstones, which are responsible for 21–33% of cases, followed by alcohol (16–27%) and elevated triglycerides (2–5%).

== See also ==
- Canine pancreatitis
- Chronic pancreatitis
