= Blood test =

Laboratory analysis performed on a blood sample

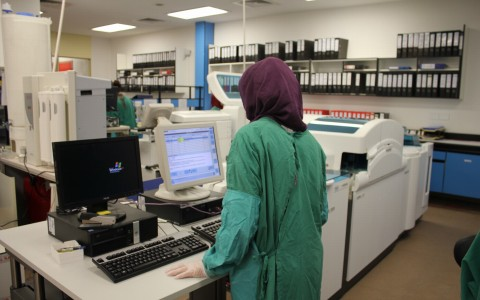
Modern hospital hematology laboratory

A blood test is a laboratory analysis performed on a blood sample that is usually extracted from a vein in the arm using a hypodermic needle, or via fingerprick. Multiple tests for specific blood components, such as a glucose test or a cholesterol test, are often grouped together into one test panel called a blood panel or blood work. Blood tests are often used in health care to determine physiological and biochemical states, such as disease, mineral content, pharmaceutical drug effectiveness, and organ function. Typical clinical blood panels include a basic metabolic panel or a complete blood count. Blood tests are also used in drug tests to detect drug abuse.

== Extraction ==
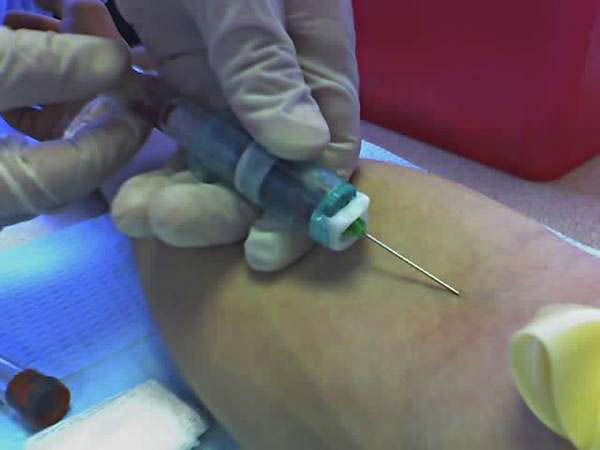
A venipuncture performed using a vacutainer

A venipuncture is useful as it is a minimally invasive way to obtain cells and extracellular fluid (plasma) from the body for analysis. Blood flows throughout the body, acting as a medium that provides oxygen and nutrients to tissues and carries waste products back to the excretory systems for disposal. Consequently, the state of the bloodstream affects or is affected by, many medical conditions. For these reasons, blood tests are the most commonly performed medical tests.

If only a few drops of blood are needed, a fingerstick is performed instead of a venipuncture.

Indwelling arterial, central venous and peripheral venous lines can also be used to draw blood.

Phlebotomists, laboratory practitioners and nurses are those in charge of extracting blood from a patient. This can be done in-clinic, in-office, or through mobile (home) phlebotomists. However, in special circumstances, and/or emergency situations, paramedics and physicians extract the blood. Also, respiratory therapists are trained to extract arterial blood to examine arterial blood gases.

== Types of tests ==
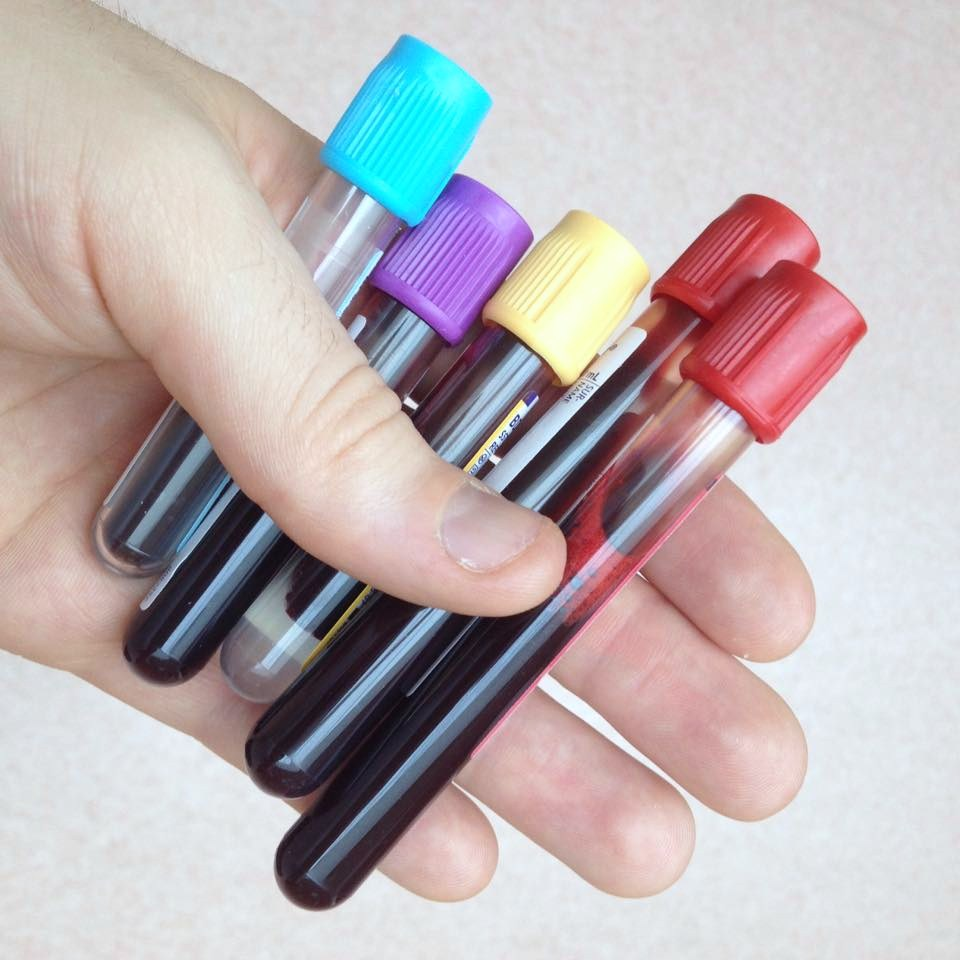
Vacutainer tubes used in the collection of blood. During venipuncture, pressure differences between the vein and the vacuum in the Vacutainer forces blood into the tube.

=== Biochemical analysis ===
A basic metabolic panel measures sodium, potassium, chloride, bicarbonate, blood urea nitrogen (BUN), magnesium, creatinine, glucose, and sometimes calcium. Tests that focus on cholesterol levels can determine LDL and HDL cholesterol levels, as well as triglyceride levels.

Some tests, such as those that measure glucose or a lipid profile, require fasting (or no food consumption) eight to twelve hours prior to the drawing of the blood sample.

For the majority of tests, blood is usually obtained from the patient's vein. Other specialized tests, such as the arterial blood gas test, require blood extracted from an artery. Blood gas analysis of arterial blood is primarily used to monitor carbon dioxide and oxygen levels related to pulmonary function, but is also used to measure blood pH and bicarbonate levels for certain metabolic conditions.

While the regular glucose test is taken at a certain point in time, the glucose tolerance test involves repeated testing to determine the rate at which glucose is processed by the body.

==== Normal ranges ====
Blood tests results should always be interpreted using the ranges provided by the laboratory that performed the test. Example ranges are shown below.

Test	Low	High	Unit	Comments
Sodium (Na)	134	145	mmol/L	
Potassium (K)	3.5	5.0	mmol/L	
Urea	2.5	6.4	mmol/L	Blood urea nitrogen (BUN)
Urea	15	40	mg/dL	
Creatinine - male	62	115	μmol/L	
Creatinine - female	53	97	μmol/L	
Creatinine - male	0.7	1.3	mg/dL	
Creatinine - female	0.6	1.2	mg/dL	
Glucose (fasting)	3.9	5.8	mmol/L	See also glycated hemoglobin
Glucose (fasting)	70	120	mg/dL	

==== Common abbreviations ====
Upon completion of a blood test analysis, patients may receive a report with blood test abbreviations. Examples of common blood test abbreviations are shown below.

Abbreviation	Stands for	Description
HDL	High Density Lipoprotein	Level of "good cholesterol" in the blood (ratio of HDL:LDL is usually more significant than actual values)
LDL	Low Density Lipoprotein	Level of "bad cholesterol" in the blood (ratio of HDL:LDL is usually more significant than actual values)
PV	Plasma Viscosity	Plasma Viscometry (PV) is the measurement of the viscosity of blood plasma. The result is a number given in milliPascal seconds (m.Pas.s) – known as the PV, or plasma viscosity.
CRP	C-Reactive Protein	Level of inflammation with the body. If the immune system is fighting an infection or illness, CRP will be higher.
CBC (UK: FBC)	Complete Blood Count (UK: Full Blood Count)	Analysis of 15 different blood test readings to provide information about overall health.
TSH	Thyroid-stimulating hormone	Thyroid regulates the function of metabolism. Low levels can lead to weight loss, while high levels lead to weight gain.
PTH	Parathyroid hormone	Regulates serum calcium
ESR	Erythrocyte Sedimentation Rate	Indicates the time it takes for red blood cells to move down a tube. This shows signs of inflammation within a body.
INR	International Normalized Ratio	This is a blood clotting test.
LFT	Liver Function Test	This test reveals the levels of waste products, enzymes and proteins that are processed by the liver.
U+E	Urea and Electrolytes	This test is performed to measure the function of kidney.
CMP	Comprehensive Metabolic Panel	This analysis provides an overall picture of the metabolism and chemical balance of the body.
WBC	White Blood Cell Count	The level of white blood cells.
RBC	Red Blood Cell Count	The level of red blood cells.
HBC	Hemoglobin	Level of hemoglobin molecules.
HCT	Hematocrit	Similar to RBC but in percentage.
PLT	Platelets	Platelets levels in the blood.

=== Molecular profiles ===
- Protein electrophoresis (general technique—not a specific test)
- Western blot (general technique—not a specific test)
- Liver function tests
- Polymerase chain reaction (DNA). DNA profiling is today possible with even very small quantities of blood: this is commonly used in forensic science, but is now also part of the diagnostic process of many disorders.
- Northern blot (RNA)
- Sexually transmitted diseases

=== Cellular evaluation ===
- Full blood count – Routine laboratory test of blood cells
- Hematocrit – Volume percentage of red blood cells in blood
- Mean corpuscular volume (MCV) – Average volume of a red blood cell, which sometimes helps in diagnosis
- Mean corpuscular hemoglobin concentration (MCHC) – Measure of hemoglobin concentration in red blood cells
- Erythrocyte sedimentation rate (ESR) – Physiological quantity
- Cross-matching. Determination of blood type for blood transfusion or transplants
- Blood cultures are commonly taken if infection is suspected. Positive cultures and resulting sensitivity results are often useful in guiding medical treatment.

== Future alternatives ==
=== Saliva tests ===
In 2008, scientists announced that the more cost effective saliva testing could eventually replace some blood tests, as saliva contains 20% of the proteins found in blood. Saliva testing may not be appropriate or available for all markers. For example, lipid levels cannot be measured with saliva testing.

=== Microemulsion ===
In February 2011, Canadian researchers at the University of Calgary's Schulich School of Engineering announced a microchip for blood tests. Dubbed a microemulsion, a droplet of blood captured inside a layer of another substance. It can control the exact size and spacing of the droplets. The new test could improve the efficiency, accuracy, and speed of laboratory tests while also doing it cheaply.

=== SIMBAS ===
In March 2011, a team of researchers from UC Berkeley, DCU and University of Valparaíso have developed lab-on-a-chip that can diagnose diseases within 10 minutes without the use of external tubing and extra components. It is called Self-powered Integrated Microfluidic Blood Analysis System (SIMBAS). It uses tiny trenches to separate blood cells from plasma (99 percent of blood cells were captured during experiments). Researchers used plastic components, to reduce manufacturing costs.

== See also ==
- Barbro Hjalmarsson
- Biomarker (medicine), a protein or other biomolecule measured in a blood test
- Blood film, a way to look at blood cells under a microscope
- Blood gas test
- Blood lead level
- Hematology – Study of blood and blood diseases
- Luminol, a visual test for blood left at crime scenes.
- Reference ranges for blood tests
- Schumm test – Test for blood mismatch
- Category:Blood tests
- List of medical tests
