= Gustav Hjalmarsson =

Swedish ice hockey player

- Born: April 2, 1986 (age 38); Gislaved, Sweden
- Height: 6 ft 0 in (183 cm)
- Weight: 194 lb (88 kg; 13 st 12 lb)
- Position: Forward
- Shoots: Left
- SEL team: Växjö Lakers
- NHL draft: Undrafted
- Playing career: 2006–present

Gustav Hjalmarsson (born April 2, 1986) is a Swedish professional ice hockey player. He is currently playing with Växjö Lakers Hockey in the Swedish Elitserien.
