= Hemoglobinemia =

Abnormally increased hemoglobin in blood plasma

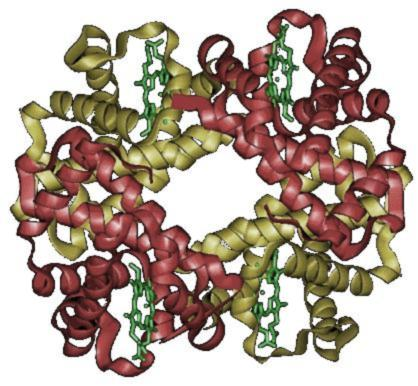
- Hemoglobin

Hemoglobinemia (or haemoglobinaemia) is a medical condition in which there is an excess of hemoglobin in the blood plasma. This is an effect of intravascular hemolysis, in which hemoglobin separates from red blood cells, a form of anemia.

Hemoglobinemia can be caused by intrinsic or extrinsic factors. When hemoglobinemia is internally caused, it is a result of recessive genetic defects that cause the red blood cells to lyse, letting the hemoglobin spill out of the cell into the blood plasma.

In intravascular hemolysis, hemoglobin is released and binds with haptoglobin. This causes haptoglobin levels to decrease. Once haptoglobin is saturated, free hemoglobin readily distributes to tissues where it might be exposed to oxidative conditions. In such conditions, heme can be released from ferric hemoglobin. The free heme can then accelerate tissue damage by promoting peroxidative reactions and activation of inflammatory cascades. Hemopexin (Hx) is another plasma glycoprotein able to bind heme with high affinity. Hx sequesters heme in an inert, non-toxic form and transports it to the liver for catabolism and excretion. As long as both haptoglobin and hemopexin are saturated, the remaining free hemoglobins are filtered in the kidney and some of them will be reabsorbed by way of proximal tubules.

In externally caused hemoglobinemia, an outside attacker acts as an antibody against the red blood cells. This can cause the cells to be destroyed and their hemoglobin released. In extravascular hemolysis, red blood cells are phagocytized by macrophages in the spleen and liver.

Abnormal value of hemoglobin does not necessarily indicate a medical problem needing treatment. Diet, activity level, medications, a women's menstrual cycle, and other considerations can affect the results. Additionally to these, one may have higher than normal hemoglobin if they live in a high altitude area.

== Causes ==
There are other causes besides what happens within the body in the blood cells. Other factors that can cause an excess amount of hemoglobin are:

- Smoking (which may result in low blood oxygen levels)
- Higher altitudes where your red blood cell production naturally increases to compensate for the lower oxygen supply there

Specific disorders or other factors that may cause a high hemoglobin count include:

- Lung disease
- Heart disease
- COPD (chronic obstructive pulmonary disease)
- Dehydration
- Emphysema
- Heart failure
- Kidney cancer
- Liver cancer
- Other types of heart disease
- Other types of lung disease
- Polycythemia vera, a disorder in which your body makes too many red blood cells. It can cause headaches, fatigue, and shortness of breath.

== Diagnosis ==
=== Normal hemoglobin levels ===
Normal hemoglobin levels correlate with the person's age and sex. Levels can vary between different testing systems and under their doctor's consultation. A hemoglobin test measures the amount of hemoglobin in your blood. If a hemoglobin tests shows that a person's levels are below normal, it means they have a low red blood cell count, which is known as anemia. If the test shows higher levels than normal, it means they have hemoglobinemia.

The normal range for hemoglobin is:

- For men, 13.5 to 17.5 grams per deciliter. 13.5 and 18 g/dl are the lower and upper limits of the acceptable range.
- For women, 12.0 to 15.5 grams per deciliter 12 and 16 g/dl are the lower and upper limits of the acceptable range.

Symptoms of anemia

== Treatment ==
High hemoglobin levels are a rare occurrence but is usually treated as a symptom for an underlying disease. Consulting a doctor is the best treatment, so they can diagnose your illness and give a recommended treatment plan to lower hemoglobin levels back to normal.

== See also ==
- Coagulation
- Blood diseases
- Methemoglobinemia, an abnormal amount of methemoglobin which is carrying oxygen but unable to release it effectively to body tissues, is produced.
