= Haptoglobin =

Mammalian protein found in Homo sapiens

HP
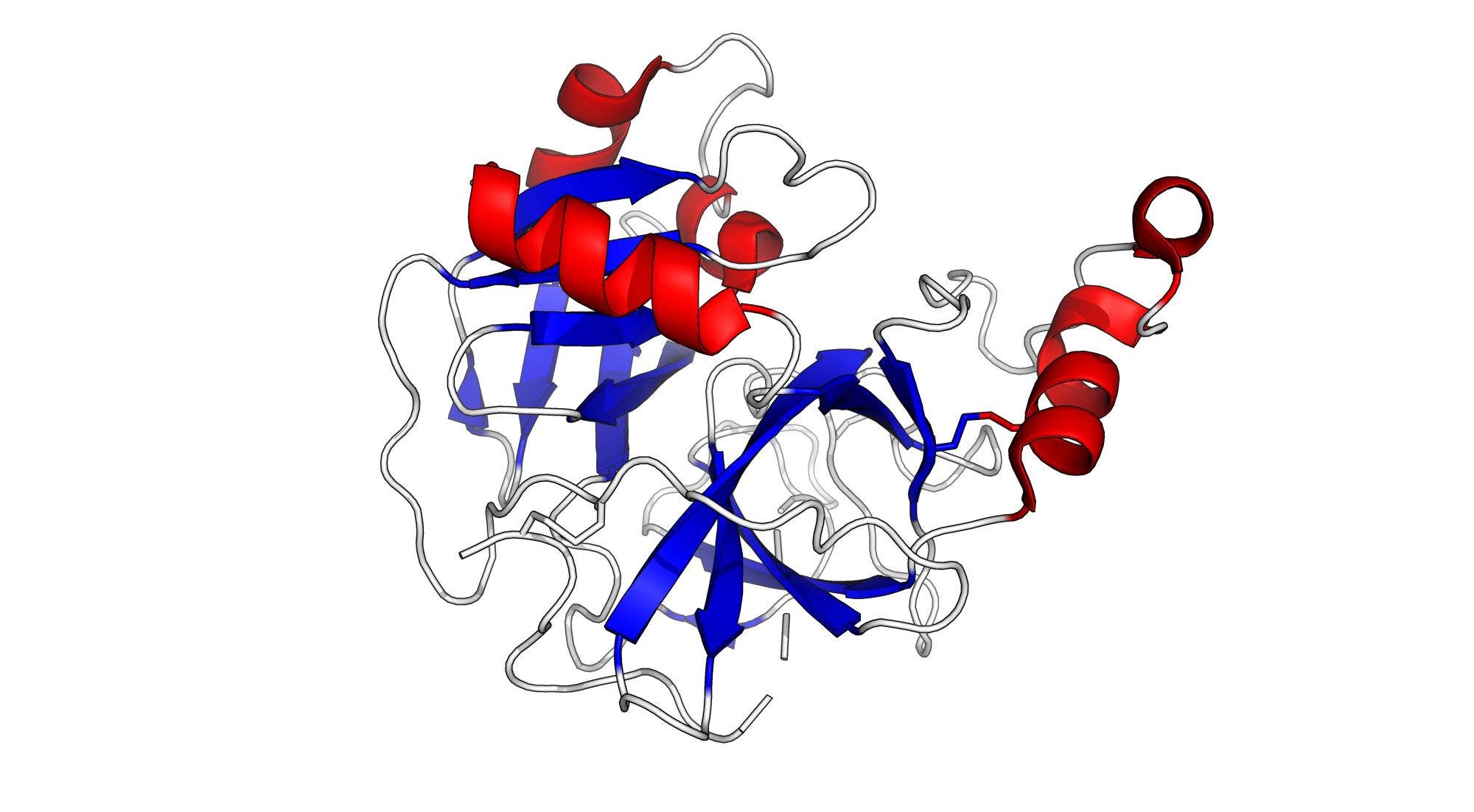

Identifiers
- Aliases: HP, BP, HP2ALPHA2, HPA1S, haptoglobin
- External IDs: OMIM: 140100; MGI: 96211; GeneCards: HP
Available structures
PDB	Ortholog search: PDBe RCSB
PDB	List of PDB id codes 4X0L, 4WJG, 5HU6

Gene location (Human)
Chr.	Chromosome 16 (human)
Band	16q22.2	Start	72,054,505 bp
Band	16q22.2	End	72,061,055 bp

Gene location (Mouse)
Chr.	Chromosome 8 (mouse)
Band	8 D3|8 57.11 cM	Start	110,301,760 bp
Band	8 D3|8 57.11 cM	End	110,305,804 bp
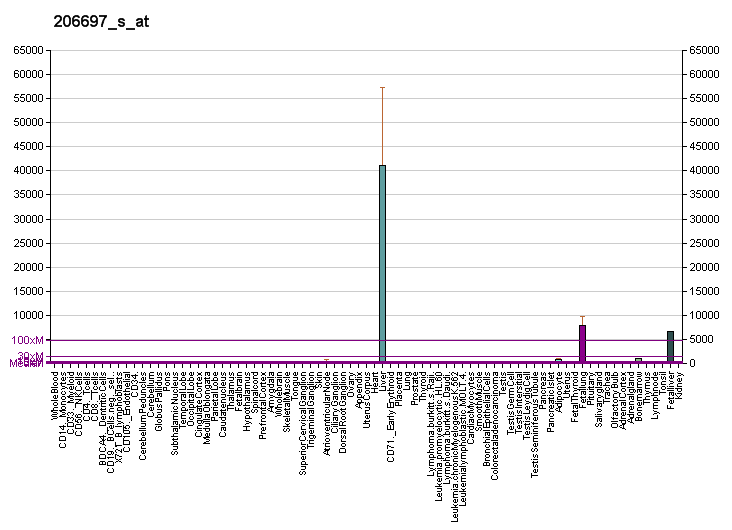
RNA expression pattern
Bgee	Human / Mouse (ortholog); Top expressed in: pericardium; right lobe of liver; olfactory zone of nasal mucosa; parietal pleura; bone marrow; germinal epithelium; bone marrow cell; trabecular bone; peritoneum; vena cava / Top expressed in: lacrimal gland; gallbladder; left lobe of liver; granulocyte; right lung lobe; stroma of bone marrow; white adipose tissue; subcutaneous adipose tissue; tunica adventitia of aorta; tibiofemoral joint; More reference expression data
BioGPS	More reference expression data
Gene ontology
Molecular function	antioxidant activity; protein binding; hemoglobin binding; serine-type endopeptidase activity
Cellular component	extracellular region; endocytic vesicle lumen; extracellular exosome; blood microparticle; haptoglobin-hemoglobin complex; extracellular space; specific granule lumen; tertiary granule lumen
Biological process	cellular oxidant detoxification; defense response; positive regulation of cell death; acute-phase response; receptor-mediated endocytosis; defense response to bacterium; response to hydrogen peroxide; negative regulation of oxidoreductase activity; negative regulation of hydrogen peroxide catabolic process; immune system process; neutrophil degranulation; acute inflammatory response; proteolysis; response to organic substance
Sources:Amigo / QuickGO
Orthologs
Databases	NCBI: entry; OMA: entry
Species	Human	Mouse
Entrez	3240	15439
Ensembl	ENSG00000257017	ENSMUSG00000031722
UniProt	P00738	Q61646
RefSeq (mRNA)	NM_001126102; NM_005143; NM_001318138	NM_017370; NM_001329965
RefSeq (protein)	NP_001119574; NP_001305067; NP_005134	NP_001316894; NP_059066
Location (UCSC)	Chr 16: 72.05 – 72.06 Mb	Chr 8: 110.3 – 110.31 Mb
PubMed search
- Wikidata
View/Edit Human	View/Edit Mouse

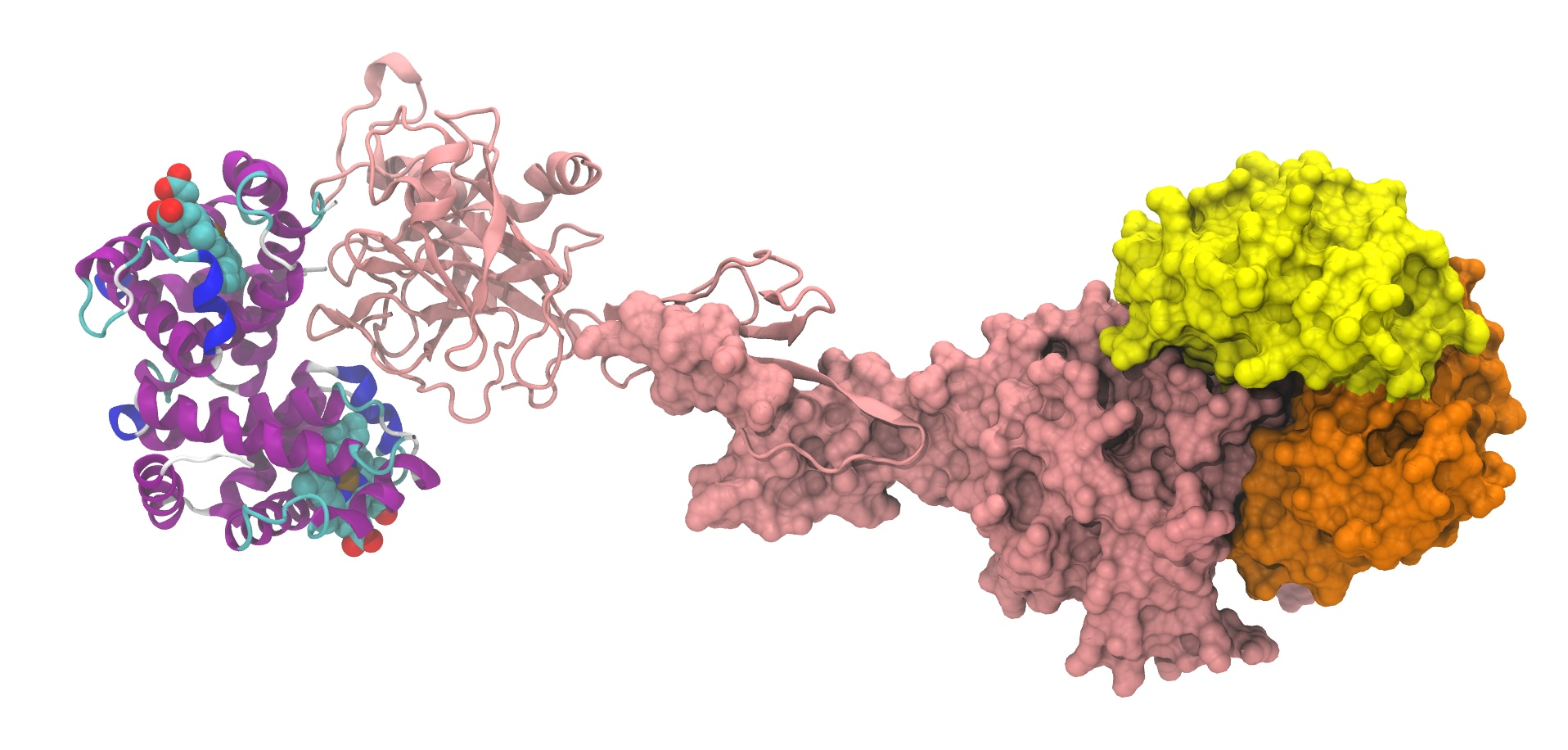
A model of α,β-hemoglobin/haptoglobin hexamer complex. There are 2 α,β-hemoglobin dimers depicted: one space filling model (yellow/orange), and one ribbon model (purple/blue). Each is bound by a haptoglobin molecule (both haptoglobin molecules are shown in pink, with one as a space filling model and one as a ribbon model).

Haptoglobin (abbreviated as Hp) is the protein that in humans is encoded by the HP gene. In blood plasma, haptoglobin binds with high affinity to free hemoglobin released from erythrocytes, and thereby inhibits its deleterious oxidative activity. Compared to Hp, hemopexin binds to free heme. The haptoglobin-hemoglobin complex will then be removed by the reticuloendothelial system (mostly the spleen).

In clinical settings, the haptoglobin assay is used to screen for and monitor intravascular hemolytic anemia. In intravascular hemolysis, free hemoglobin will be released into circulation and hence haptoglobin will bind the hemoglobin. This causes a decline in haptoglobin levels.

The protein was discovered as a "plasma substance" in 1938 by French biochemists Max-Fernand Jayle and Michel Polonovski.

== Function ==
Hemoglobin that has been released into the blood plasma by damaged red blood cells has harmful effects. The HP gene encodes a preproprotein that is processed to yield both alpha and beta chains, which subsequently combines as a tetramer to produce haptoglobin. Haptoglobin functions to bind the free plasma hemoglobin, which allows degradative enzymes to gain access to the hemoglobin while at the same time preventing loss of iron through the kidneys and protecting the kidneys from damage by hemoglobin.

The cellular receptor target of Hp is the monocyte/macrophage scavenger receptor, CD163. Following Hb-Hp binding to CD163, cellular internalization of the complex leads to globin and heme metabolism, which is followed by adaptive changes in antioxidant and iron metabolism pathways and macrophage phenotype polarization.

Hp has hemoglobin-independent immunomodulatory functions. It dampens lipopolysaccharide-induced cytokine expression. Lipopolysaccharides directly bind to Hp, which, due to the high abundance of Hp in serum, results in their buffering and shielding from toll-like receptor 4. Functionally, this results in delayed activation of the NF-κB pathway.

=== Difference from hemopexin ===
When hemoglobin is released from RBCs within the physiologic range of haptoglobin, the potential deleterious effects of hemoglobin are prevented. During hyper-hemolytic conditions or with chronic hemolysis, haptoglobin is depleted and hemoglobin readily distributes to tissues where it might be exposed to oxidative conditions. In such conditions, heme can be released from ferric (Fe^{3+}-bound) hemoglobin. The free heme can then accelerate tissue damage by promoting peroxidative reactions and activation of inflammatory cascades. Hemopexin (Hx) is another plasma glycoprotein that is able to bind heme with high affinity. It sequesters heme in an inert non-toxic form and transports it to the liver for catabolism and excretion.

== Synthesis ==
Haptoglobin is produced mostly by hepatic cells but also by other tissues such as skin, lung and kidney. In addition, the haptoglobin gene is expressed in murine and human adipose tissue.

Haptoglobin had been shown to be expressed in adipose tissue of cattle as well.

== Structure ==
Haptoglobin, in its simplest form, consists of two alpha and two beta chains, connected by disulfide bridges. The chains originate from a common precursor protein, which is proteolytically cleaved during protein synthesis.

Hp exists in two allelic forms in the human population, so-called Hp1 and Hp2, the latter one having arisen due to the partial duplication of Hp1 gene. Three genotypes of Hp, therefore, are found in humans: Hp1-1, Hp2-1, and Hp2-2. Hp of different genotypes have been shown to bind hemoglobin with different affinities, with Hp2-2 being the weakest binder. Allele 2 encodes for two multimerization domains. This results in oligomer formation in carriers of allele 2. The frequency of the short allele varies between 7% and 70% depending on racial origin. It is unclear which evolutionary advantage is conferred by the longer allele; strikingly, a similar partial duplication independently arose much earlier in a precursor of ruminants. Ruminants exclusively express oligomeric haptoglobin.

== In other species ==
Hp has been found in all mammals studied so far, some birds, e.g., cormorant and ostrich but also, in its simpler form, in bony fish, e.g., zebrafish. Hp is absent in at least some amphibians (Xenopus) and neognathous birds (chicken and goose).

== Clinical significance ==
Mutations in this gene or its regulatory regions cause ahaptoglobinemia or hypohaptoglobinemia. This gene has also been linked to diabetic nephropathy, the incidence of coronary artery disease in type 1 diabetes, Crohn's disease, inflammatory disease behavior, primary sclerosing cholangitis, susceptibility to idiopathic Parkinson's disease, the severity of post-exertional malaise in myalgic encephalomyelitis / chronic fatigue syndrome, and a reduced incidence of Plasmodium falciparum malaria.

Since the reticuloendothelial system will remove the haptoglobin-hemoglobin complex from the body, haptoglobin levels will be decreased in case of intravascular hemolysis or severe extravascular hemolysis. In the process of binding to free hemoglobin, haptoglobin sequesters the iron within hemoglobin, preventing iron-utilizing bacteria from benefiting from hemolysis. It is theorized that, because of this, haptoglobin has evolved into an acute-phase protein. HP has a protective influence on the hemolytic kidney.

The different haptoglobin phenotypes differ in their antioxidant, scavenging, and immunomodulatory properties. This aspect of haptoglobin may gain importance in immune suppressed conditions (such as liver cirrhosis) and the various phenotypes may result in different susceptibility levels towards bacterial infections.

Some studies associate certain haptoglobin phenotypes with the risk of developing hypertension in diabetes and schizophrenia.

=== Test protocol ===
Measuring the level of haptoglobin in a patient's blood is ordered whenever a patient exhibits symptoms of anemia, such as pallor, fatigue, or shortness of breath, along with physical signs of hemolysis, such as jaundice or dark-colored urine. The test is also commonly ordered as a hemolytic anemia battery, which also includes a reticulocyte count and a peripheral blood smear. It can also be ordered along with a direct antiglobulin test when a patient is suspected of having a transfusion reaction or symptoms of autoimmune hemolytic anemia. Also, it may be ordered in conjunction with a bilirubin.

=== Interpretation ===
A decrease in haptoglobin can support a diagnosis of hemolysis, especially when correlated with a decreased hemoglobin, and hematocrit, and also an increased reticulocyte count. Low haptoglobin levels occur regardless of the site and mechanism of haemolysis (intravascular and splenic/"extravascular")

If the reticulocyte count is increased, but the haptoglobin level is normal, this argues against haemolysis, and suggests a bone marrow response to blood loss. If there are symptoms of anemia but both the reticulocyte count and the haptoglobin level are normal, the anemia is most likely not due to hemolysis. Haptoglobin levels that are decreased but do not accompany signs of anemia may indicate advanced liver damage, as the liver is the major site of production of haptoglobin.

As haptoglobin is an acute-phase protein, any inflammatory process (infection, injury, allergy, etc.) may increase the levels of plasma haptoglobin, but patients with haemolysis usually have low haptoglobin regardless of the presence of inflammation

== See also ==
- Hemopexin
- Haptoglobin-related protein
