= Methemalbumin =

Methemalbumin (MHA) is an albumin complex consisting of albumin and heme. Methemalbuminaemia, the presence of a raised concentration in the blood, is a clinical condition that can be caused by severe intravascular haemolysis or acute haemorrhagic pancreatitis.

This can be due to proteolytic breakdown of haemoglobin to form both haem and methaem. Methaem combines with blood plasma albumin to form methemalbumin which is found in trace amount in the blood. Even though usually only present in trace amounts, this complex gives the brown color to plasma.

Its presence in plasma is used to differentiate between hemorrhagic and edematous pancreatitis. Bleeding into the abdominal cavity is another known cause of methemalbuminaemia.

The Schumm test is used to differentiate intravascular haemolysis from extravascular haemolysis, as in haemolytic anaemias. A positive result is indicative of intravascular haemolysis.
