= Barbro Hjalmarsson =

- Born: 10 December 1919; Närke, Sweden
- Died: 13 February 2012 (aged 92); Degerfors, Sweden
- Citizenship: Sweden
- Occupations: Nurse, Care Teacher and Inventor

Hilda Barbro Hjalmarsson (10 December 1919 – 13 February 2012) was a Swedish nurse, care teacher and inventor.

== Biography ==
Barbro Hjalmarsson invented the battery-powered blood cradle "Triomix", which automatically shakes a test tube with blood so that the blood cells are separated from the blood plasma correctly. Her invention saved both the time it took to turn each tube 10-12 times as well as increased quality in the test by avoiding human error. She was granted a patent in 1994 for this "Mixing apparatus comprising a mixing plate intended for receiving test tube tubes, which is imparted to a rocking movement of a certain frequency". Her invention reduced the manual work and made the sampling safer.
