= Paul Negulescu =

American cell biologist

- Born: Paul Adrian Negulescu; San Francisco
- Citizenship: USA
- Education: University of California, Berkeley (BSc, PhD)
- Known for: Research of cystic fibrosis
- Awards: Warren Alpert Foundation Prize (2018); Shaw Prize in Life Science & Medicine (2022); Wiley Prize (2023); Breakthrough Prize in Life Sciences (2024)
- Scientific career
- Fields: Cell biology
- Institutions: University of California, Irvine; Aurora Biosciences; Vertex Pharmaceuticals
- Thesis: The role and regulation of intracellular calcium during stimulus-secretion coupling in the parietal cell (1988)
- Doctoral advisor: Terry Machen

Paul Adrian Negulescu is an American cell biologist. He is a Senior Vice President at American pharmaceutical company Vertex Pharmaceuticals. He received the 2022 Shaw Prize in Life science and medicine, together with Michael J. Welsh, for their work that uncovered the etiology of cystic fibrosis and developed effective medications.

== Early life and education ==
Negulescu was born in San Francisco to first-generation immigrants from Romania. His father was a surgeon, and his grandfather, Constantin Vișoianu, was a former Minister of Foreign Affairs of Romania. He has a brother.

Thanks to his childhood experience, he initially wanted to graduate with history from the University of California, Berkeley. A third-year physiology class taught by Roger Y. Tsien had a great influence on Negulescu, who eventually graduated with a dual degree in history and physiology in 1986. He then went on and studied PhD in physiology under Terry Machen, completing it in 1990.

== Career ==
Negulescu started his career as a postdoctoral researcher at the University of California, Berkeley and under Michael Cahalan at the University of California, Irvine. He was planning to move to the University of Connecticut when Roger Y. Tsien asked him to join a startup company he was forming called Aurora Biosciences. Negulescu joined Aurora Biosciences in 1996 as one of the first employees. He became Senior Vice President of Discovery Biology in 1999. When Vertex Pharmaceuticals acquired Aurora Biosciences in 2001, he was appointed Senior Vice President of Research. Negulescu has been leading the San Diego Research Center of Vertex Pharmaceuticals since 2003.

== Research ==
Negulescu's research focuses on the therapy of cystic fibrosis. Cystic fibrosis can be caused by any of the thousands of identified mutations in the CFTR protein, an ion channel that allows chloride ions to pass through. These mutations have been classified into Class I to V, with Class III mutations causing defective channel gates in CFTR despite normal expression of the protein. Via high-throughput screening, his team at Vertex Pharmaceuticals discovered ivacaftor, a small-molecule potentiator that increases the probability that mutated CFTR gates will open. Ivacaftor was approved by the Food and Drug Administration (FDA) for cystic fibrosis patients with one specific Class III mutation in 2012, and has since been approved for mutation classes as well. Of note, the expanded approval in 2017 was based solely on in vitro data, due to the small number of patients carrying those rare mutations making clinical trials impossible.

Negulescu also led the discovery of another cystic fibrosis drug, lumacaftor, which is known as a "corrector" as it acts as a chaperone to help the CFTR protein fold correctly. Thus, it can be used in patients with Class II mutations, which create misfolded CFTR protein that cannot reaching the cell surface. The most common Class II mutation is F508del. Again with high-throughput screening, Negulescu and his team found that lumacaftor can correct F508del-mutated CFTR protein. It was later found that the drug was not effective enough when administered on its own, but was so when administered together with ivacaftor. The FDA approved this drug combination in 2015. Further research led to the discovery of tezacaftor and elexacaftor, 2 other correctors of the CFTR protein. The triple combination elexacaftor/tezacaftor/ivacaftor was approved by the FDA in 2019.

== Honors and awards ==
- 2018 - Warren Alpert Foundation Prize
- 2022 - Shaw Prize in Life Science & Medicine
- 2023 - Wiley Prize
- 2024 - Breakthrough Prize in Life Sciences

== Personal life ==
Negulescu met his wife, Debbie, during his time at the University of California, Irvine.
