= Peter Grootenhuis =

Dutch-American medicinal chemist (1960–2019)

Peter Grootenhuis (March 1960 – August 2019) was a Dutch-American Medicinal Chemist. Grootenhuis was the Project Leader and Co-Inventor of Ivacaftor (VX-770), the first CFTR potentiator FDA approved drug to treat the underlying cause of Cystic Fibrosis (CF) in patients with certain mutations in the Cystic Fibrosis Transmembrane Conductance Regulator (CFTR) gene (primarily the G551D mutation.), who account for 4-5% of CF cases. Grootenhuis also led the Vertex team to subsequent discovery of Orkambi, the combination of Ivacaftor and Lumacaftor(VX-809), approved to treat CF in people with two copies of the F508del mutation (~ 50% of CF patients). Most recently, Grootenhuis's team discovered Tezacaftor (VX-661) and Elexacaftor (VX-445), which in combination with Ivacaftor are the components of Trikafta, a drug approved by the FDA in 2019 to treat CF in more than 90% of CF patients. For Grootenhuis' contributions to the discovery of these compounds, he was awarded the 2018 IUPAC Richter Prize, the American Chemical Society's 2013 Heroes of Chemistry Award, and inducted into the American Chemical Society Division of Medicinal Chemistry Hall of Fame. Grootenhuis has contributed to the discovery of over 11 clinical candidates, co-authored more than 100 peer reviewed papers and is inventor of 65 + U.S Patents, and more than 50 EU Patents.

== Biography ==
Grootenhuis completed both his BSc and MSc in chemistry at the University of Utrecht (1978–1983). He then went on to complete his PhD in organic chemistry under the guidance of David Reinhoudt (1983-1987)

After finishing his PhD, Grootenhuis completed a postdoctoral fellowship at the University of California, San Francisco on a NATO Fellowship, under Peter Kollman (1987–1989). Consequently, he went on to work at Organon (now Akzo-Nobel) for several years, simultaneously holding a part-time Professorship at the University of Groningen and doing a short sabbatical with Martin Karplus at Harvard University (1991). After nine years at Organon, Grootenhuis moved to San Diego, CA to work for CombiChem as Vice President of Computational Chemistry in 1998. Grootenhuis stayed with the company through several corporate mergers by DuPont Pharmaceuticals, Bristol-Myers Squibb, and lastly Deltagen Inc. After Deltagen folded, Grootenhuis worked for 19 years at Vertex Pharmaceuticals, notably as the Project Leader for the CFTR modulator project. From 2005 to 2016, Grootenhuis held a faculty appointment at the Free University of Amsterdam (VU), serving as the Nauta Chair (Professor Emeritus) of Virtual Drug Screening & Design.

Grootenhuis was a lifelong karate student and received multiple black belts. He was specifically interested in the Physics of Kobudō, an ancient Okinawan weapons-based martial arts discipline, eventually writing a book on the subject in 2018. He was awarded the title of Sensei in March 2019 by Grandmaster Jerry Devine of Pacific Martial Arts

== Awards ==
- KNCV Gouden Medaille, Royal Dutch Chemical Society (1995)
- Noordwijkerhout-Camerino Prize (1997)
- Heroes of Chemistry, American Chemical Society (2013)
- IUPAC-Richter Prize in Medicinal Chemistry (2018)
- Hall of Fame, American Chemical Society, Division of Medicinal Chemistry (2019)
- Distinguished Scientist Award, American Chemical Society, San Diego Chapter (2019)

== Professional Affiliations ==
- American Chemical Society
- Bristol Myers Squibb
- CombiChem-DuPont
- Deltagen Pharmaceuticals
- Organon (Akzo-Nobel)
- Vertex Pharmaceuticals

== Institutions ==
- University of Utrecht, BSc and MSc chemistry (1983)
- University of Twente, PhD organic chemistry (1987)
- University of California, San Francisco, postdoctoral researcher (1987–1989)
- University of Groningen, part-time professor (1989–1991)
- Harvard University, sabbatical (1991)
- Free University of Amsterdam (VU), professor emeritus (2005–2016)
