= Joshua Boger =

Organic chemist and the founder of Vertex Pharmaceuticals

Josh Boger
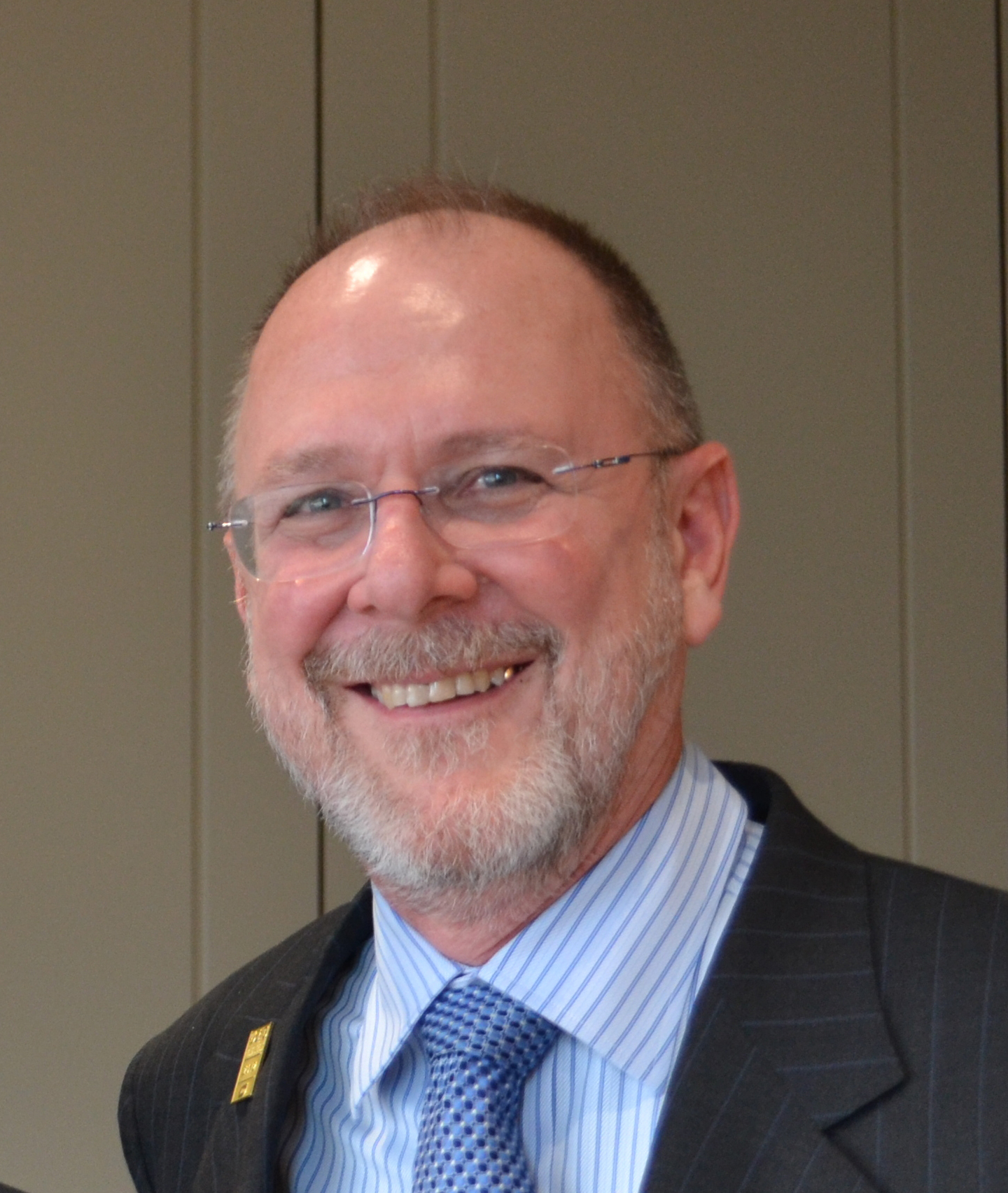
- Born: April 12, 1951 (age 75); Concord, North Carolina, U.S.
- Education: Wesleyan University (BA); Harvard University (MA, PhD)
- Spouse: Amy Schafer
- Awards: Biotechnology Heritage Award; Othmer Gold Medal

External videos
- “Joshua Boger '73: Cure Entrepreneur”, Wesleyan University, Apr 6, 2011
- “The Innovator's Business, Managing in Balance”, Joshua Boger, February 25, 2014

Joshua S. Boger (born April 12, 1951) is an organic chemist and the founder of Vertex Pharmaceuticals Incorporated. He is considered a pioneer in the field of structure-based rational drug design. Drugs developed include amprenavir, an HIV protease inhibitor; telaprevir, a protease inhibitor for treatment of hepatitis C; and Kalydeco, for the treatment of cystic fibrosis. In 2003, Vertex was listed as one of forty worldwide Technology Pioneers by the World Economic Forum. As of 2012, Boger became executive chairman of Alkeus Pharmaceuticals.

== Childhood ==
Joshua S. Boger was born on April 12, 1951, in Concord, North Carolina to Charles E. Boger, Jr., a textile chemist and Mary Snead Boger, an actress and writer.

== Education ==
From 1970 to 1973, Boger attended Wesleyan University. During this time Max Tishler, formerly the president of Merck Sharp and Dohme Research Laboratories, became Boger's mentor. Boger received a bachelor's degree in chemistry and philosophy from Wesleyan in 1973.

Boger then attended Harvard University, where he worked with Jeremy R. Knowles on the chemistry of cyclodextrin. He received his master's degree in 1975 and doctorate degree in chemistry in 1979. He did postdoctoral research in molecular recognition with Jean-Marie Lehn from the Université Louis Pasteur in Strasbourg, France.

== Career ==
=== Merck Sharp & Dohme Research Laboratories ===
On the recommendation of Max Tishler, Boger was hired by Merck Sharp & Dohme Research Laboratories in 1978. He initially worked on hypertension drugs, developing a highly potent renin inhibitor. An important step in this process was the application of computer modeling to the chemistry of drug design.

Within 2 years, Boger was leading a group at Merck where he developed novel rational drug design techniques and applied them to pharmaceutical discovery and development. By 1987 Boger became senior director of basic chemistry at Merck Sharp & Dohme Research Laboratories, in charge of the departments of Biophysical Chemistry and Medicinal Chemistry of Immunology and Inflammation.

=== Vertex Pharmaceuticals Incorporated ===
In 1989, Boger founded Vertex Pharmaceuticals Incorporated. He has served variously as its president, CEO and chairman of the board.

At Vertex, Boger pioneered an approach to structure-based rational drug design that changed the way that drug development occurred. The analogy often used for structure-based design is that of a lock and key: first understand the type of lock involved, and then design a key to fit that lock. Researchers sought to understand the structure of the molecules that might affect disease processes (the "lock") and then to design drugs capable of interacting with the target molecules to alter their functions (the "key"). Employees worked in multi-disciplinary teams, combined technologies from biophysics, chemistry and computer science, and applied them to drug discovery and the development of small molecule drugs. As of 2003, Vertex was listed as one of forty worldwide Technology Pioneers by the World Economic Forum, for advancing drug discovery through this approach.

While under Boger's leadership, the company worked on several potentially valuable drug treatments. Agenerase (amprenavir), an HIV protease inhibitor, was co-developed by Vertex and GlaxoSmithKline for the treatment of HIV/AIDS and approved by the FDA in 1999. A second related drug was submitted for approval in 2002. Lexiva (fosamprenavir) was approved by U.S. regulators on October 20, 2003.

Vertex also developed Telaprevir, a protease inhibitor for treatment of hepatitis C. Telaprevir works by disabling a protein that the virus requires for replication. Scientists at Vertex first published the crystal structure for the protease of the hepatitis C virus in 1996. As part of the development process for the drug, the company developed an elaborate systems biology model in which they modeled hepatitis C's dynamics to the level of individual patient response. Telaprevir was approved by the Food and Drug Administration as Incivek in May 2011.

A third product, an orally administered pill for the treatment of cystic fibrosis, grew out of the acquisition of Aurora Biosciences Corporation by Vertex in 2001. The San Diego research company had a contract with the Cystic Fibrosis Foundation, a nonprofit for patient advocacy and research, to create an assay for the disease. After the acquisition, the Cystic Fibrosis Foundation approached Vertex about expanding the contract to search for a drug treatment. The potential market for such a drug was small, unlikely to return a profit. The problem required a new approach: finding a way to turn on a non-functioning protein. Boger's decision to investigate a new area has been treated as a case study by the Harvard Business School. It is one of the first examples of venture philanthropy funding, in which a charity buys equity in a company, which then tries to solve a specific problem for them. Vertex has since developed several possible drugs for the treatment of cystic fibrosis, the first of which was Kalydeco in 2012.

Boger retired as CEO of Vertex as of May 23, 2009, but remained on the Vertex Board of directors until June 2017. The history of Vertex has been chronicled by journalist Barry Werth in The Billion-Dollar Molecule (1995) and The Antidote.

=== Alkeus Pharmaceuticals ===
In May 2012 Boger became executive chairman of Alkeus Pharmaceuticals. Alkeus is developing a possible drug treatment for Stargardt disease, a progressive genetic condition that is a major cause of juvenile macular degeneration.

As of 2014, Boger was the author of over 50 scientific publications and held 32 issued U.S. patents.

== Philanthropy ==
Boger is a founding director and chairman of NEHI (Network for Excellence in Health Innovation), established in 2002. He is a founding director and vice-chairman of the Alliance for Business Leadership (formerly the Progressive Business Leaders Network), established in 2006. Boger is a member of the board of fellows of the Harvard Medical School.

Boger is an advocate of liberal education who has been strongly involved with his alma mater, Wesleyan University. Boger became a member of the board of trustees of Wesleyan University as of 1999, and chairman of the board of trustees as of 2009. On his retirement from the board of trustees in 2016, he and his family donated $20 million to Wesleyan, over half of which established an endowed scholarship program.

“In an age of instant information access, the core skills for the 21st century are information curation, critical analysis, and cross-discipline integration. Increasingly, it is apparent that needed progress in complex fields like healthcare innovation requires balance and judgment across technical, social and political areas."

Boger has been the chairman of the board of directors of the Celebrity Series of Boston. Boger has also served as the vice-chairman of the Boston Museum of Science.

He supports a variety of progressive and social justice causes, including the Greater Boston Food Bank. With Paul Sagan he has funded the Massachusetts' ACLU Technology for Liberty & Justice for All initiative. He has been honored by the Jewish Alliance for Law and Social Action of Boston for his activities.

Boger is a Trustee Emeritus of The Hastings Center, a nonprofit bioethics research institute.

== Photography ==
In 2000, Boger combined his interests in scuba diving and photography by photographing the coral reefs off Wakaya Island near Fiji. By 2014, he was showing his underwater photography in one-man gallery shows. A permanent exhibit of 22 photographs, “Wakaya Octocorals and Giants,” is on display at the Exley Science Center at Wesleyan University.

== Awards ==
- 2018, Othmer Gold Medal, Science History Institute
- 2015, Lifetime Achievement Award, Boston Business Journal
- 2011, Biotechnology Heritage Award, from the Biotechnology Industry Organization (BIO) and the Chemical Heritage Foundation
- 2009, Distinguished Community Leadership Award, Jewish Alliance for Law & Social Action (JALSA)
- 2009, Biotech Hall of Fame
- 2003, one of forty Worldwide Technology Pioneers, World Economic Forum
