= C20H21NO3 =

The molecular formula C_{20}H_{21}NO_{3} (molar mass: 323.38 g/mol, exact mass: 323.1521 u) may refer to:

- Dimefline
- Mepixanox (Pimexone)
