= Icenticaftor =

Chemical compound

Clinical data
- Other names: QBW251
- ATC code: none

Identifiers
- IUPAC name: 3-Amino-6-methoxy-N-[(2S)-3,3,3-trifluoro-2-hydroxy-2-methylpropyl]-5-(trifluoromethyl)pyridine-2-carboxamide
- CAS Number: 1334546-77-8
- PubChem CID: 58442344
- ChemSpider: 88296259
- UNII: AMB0BO0WFH
- KEGG: D12454
- CompTox Dashboard (EPA): DTXSID601336884

Chemical and physical data
- Formula: C_{12}H_{13}F_{6}N_{3}O_{3}
- Molar mass: 361.244 g·mol^{−1}
- 3D model (JSmol): Interactive image
- SMILES: C[C@](CNC(=O)C1=C(C=C(C(=N1)OC)C(F)(F)F)N)(C(F)(F)F)O
- InChI: InChI=1S/C12H13F6N3O3/c1-10(23,12(16,17)18)4-20-8(22)7-6(19)3-5(11(13,14)15)9(21-7)24-2/h3,23H,4,19H2,1-2H3,(H,20,22)/t10-/m0/s1; Key:USHQRIKZLHNPQR-JTQLQIEISA-N

Icenticaftor (development code QBW251) is a drug candidate for the treatment of chronic obstructive pulmonary disease (COPD) and cystic fibrosis. The drug is being developed by Novartis.

Like ivacaftor (which is marketed as Kalydeco), icenticaftor functions by acting as a stimulator of the protein cystic fibrosis transmembrane conductance regulator (CFTR).
