= Aurora Biosciences =

American biotechnology company

- Company type: Subsidiary
- Industry: Pharmaceuticals & Biotherapeutics
- Founded: 1995
- Fate: Acquired by Vertex Pharmaceuticals

Aurora Biosciences was a biotechnology company founded in 1995 in San Diego to commercialize fluorescence assays based on Roger Y. Tsien's discoveries concerning green fluorescent protein and its uses in basic research - work for which Tsien eventually won the 2008 Nobel Prize in chemistry along with two other chemists.

Aurora was formed at a time when established pharmaceutical companies were seeking to harness the fruits of the Human Genome Project, which had overwhelmed them with potential drug targets, and the explosion of new research tools enabled by biotechnology, as well as revolutions in chemistry that allowed many more, and many more kinds, of potential drugs to be made.

In 2000, as the investment climate turned against platform companies, Aurora started to work on its own drug discovery programs. It struck a deal with the Cystic Fibrosis Foundation under which CFF invested $30 million in Aurora, with the promise of further investment based on success, in exchange for Aurora agreeing to discover and develop new drugs to treat cystic fibrosis. This was one of the first examples of venture philanthropy. Aurora was acquired by Vertex Pharmaceuticals in 2001, but the arrangement with CFF continued and resulted in the discovery of ivacaftor in 2005 and the approval of that drug in 2012.

== History ==
Aurora Biosciences was founded in 1995 in San Diego to commercialize fluorescence assays based on Roger Y. Tsien's discoveries concerning green fluorescent protein and its uses in basic research, work for which he eventually won the 2008 Nobel Prize in Chemistry along with two other chemists. Aurora was incorporated in California in May 1995 and was reincorporated in Delaware in January 1996. Tsien co-founded the company with two colleagues from the faculty of University of California, San Diego, Charles Zuker and Michael Geoffrey, and a venture capitalist, Kevin J. Kinsella of Avalon Ventures. The first business people they brought on were Tim Rink, who became chairman and CEO, and Frank Craig to lead assay R&D and Harry Stylli to drive sales in the assay business.

Aurora received its first round of funding of $13.6 million in March 1996 and was able to raise $40 million in its IPO in 1997 on the NASDAQ exchange, even though it held the offering just after a bull run, when the markets had somewhat soured on biotechnology IPOs.

Aurora's business was focused on providing assay development services to companies trying to discover drugs, and to develop and sell new high-throughput screening (HTS) equipment and assays to use on the equipment. They were leaders in the effort to increase throughput and lower the cost of screening that took the field from screening 800 compounds a week in 1986 to being able to screen 100,000 compounds in a day, or "ultra HTS". The business model of providing discovery services based on a "platform technology" was typical in the late 1990s, as established pharmaceutical companies were seeking to harness rapid advances in biotechnology, and small biotech companies making those advances useful proliferated.

Besides deploying its know-how in use of GFP as a reporter gene, scientists at Aurora invented CCF2, a dye combining fluorescein and 7-hydroxycoumarin that creates a fluorescent signal when cleaved by beta-lactamase; this allowed beta-lactamase to be used as a reporter gene. The BLA system has become widely used in research labs. Aurora also sold proprietary stable cell lines containing its reporters for use in assays conducted with its equipment, and was unusual among its peers for requiring milestones and royalty payments on drugs brought to market that were discovered using its cell lines.

By 2000, its customers included Becton Dickinson, Bristol-Myers Squibb, Eli Lilly, Roche, Genentech, Glaxo Wellcome, Merck, the National Cancer Institute, Pfizer, Pharmacia, Warner-Lambert, and Wyeth Ayerst, and it was recognized as the industry leader in assay development and high-throughput screening services.

In 2000, Aurora changed its business model to focus on discovering and developing new drugs itself, rather than providing services to help others do so, as part of the general trend in the biotechnology industry away from discovery platforms and toward product-focused companies, which occurred as the hype over the "genomic revolution" waned. In that year it received a $30 million investment from Cystic Fibrosis Foundation to identify and develop up to three drug candidates to treat cystic fibrosis; this transaction was one of the first examples of venture philanthropy. That funding eventually grew to $150 million and led to the discovery of ivacaftor in 2005 and contributed to the eventual FDA approval of that drug in 2012.

In 2000 Aurora acquired PanVera, a contract manufacturing organization that specialized in protein production and that also sold assays, for $86 million in stock.

In 2001, Aurora was acquired by Vertex Pharmaceuticals for $592 million in stock. Vertex wanted access to Aurora's insight into drug targeting of ion channels and G-protein coupled receptors, wanted to apply Aurora's assay expertise to its programs in kinase inhibitors and caspase inhibitors, and wanted access to PanVera's protein production capacities.

In 2003, Vertex sold PanVera to Invitrogen for $95 million in cash and $10 million in assumption of debt and other costs. Later that year Vertex sold Aurora's instrument business to a private equity group, which created Aurora Discovery from it. Aurora Discovery eventually changed its name to Aurora Biotechnologies, and in 2009 was acquired by Nexus Biosystems, which made and sold automated biobank and chemical storage equipment.

Vertex retained Aurora's drug discovery facility and staff in San Diego; ivacaftor was discovered there in 2005.
