= Lumacaftor =

Cystic fibrosis drug

Clinical data
- Other names: VX-809
- License data: EU EMA: by INN
- Routes of administration: By mouth
- ATC code: R07AX30 (WHO) (combination with ivacaftor)

Legal status
- Legal status: US: ℞-only available only as lumacaftor/ivacaftor

Identifiers
- IUPAC name: 3-{6-{[1-(2,2-Difluoro-1,3-benzodioxol-5-yl)cyclopropanecarbonyl]amino}-3-methylpyridin-2-yl}benzoic acid
- CAS Number: 936727-05-8
- PubChem CID: 16678941
- IUPHAR/BPS: 7481
- DrugBank: DB09280
- ChemSpider: 17611836
- UNII: EGP8L81APK
- KEGG: D10134
- ChEBI: CHEBI:90951
- ChEMBL: ChEMBL2103870
- CompTox Dashboard (EPA): DTXSID30239523
- ECHA InfoCard: 100.241.800

Chemical and physical data
- Formula: C_{24}H_{18}F_{2}N_{2}O_{5}
- Molar mass: 452.414 g·mol^{−1}
- 3D model (JSmol): Interactive image
- SMILES: Cc1ccc(NC(=O)C2(c3ccc4c(c3)OC(F)(F)O4)CC2)nc1-c1cccc(C(=O)O)c1
- InChI: InChI=1S/C24H18F2N2O5/c1-13-5-8-19(27-20(13)14-3-2-4-15(11-14)21(29)30)28-22(31)23(9-10-23)16-6-7-17-18(12-16)33-24(25,26)32-17h2-8,11-12H,9-10H2,1H3,(H,29,30)(H,27,28,31); Key:UFSKUSARDNFIRC-UHFFFAOYSA-N

Lumacaftor is a drug that acts as a chaperone during protein folding and increases the number of CFTR proteins that are trafficked to the cell surface. It is available in a single pill with ivacaftor; the combination, lumacaftor/ivacaftor (brand name Orkambi), is used to treat people with cystic fibrosis who are homozygous for the F508del mutation in the cystic fibrosis transmembrane conductance regulator (CFTR) gene, the defective protein that causes the disease. It was developed by Vertex Pharmaceuticals and the combination was approved by the FDA in 2015. As of 2015, lumacaftor had no medical use on its own.

== See also ==
- Ataluren, targeting premature stop codons
