= Venture philanthropy =

Impact investment used for philanthropy

Venture philanthropy is a type of impact investment that takes concepts and techniques from venture capital finance and business management and applies them to achieving philanthropic goals. The term was first used in 1969 by John D. Rockefeller III to describe an imaginative and risk-taking approach to philanthropy that charitable organizations may undertake.

== Examples ==
In the year 2000, the Chicago Public Education Fund became the only venture philanthropy in the United States focused on a single urban school district, which served as a catalyst and strategic investment partner for Mayor Richard M. Daley and four Chicago Public Schools (CPS) administrations. Other examples of this type of venture philanthropy are Renaissance Philanthropy, New Profit Inc., the Robin Hood Foundation, Tipping Point Community, Cure Alzheimer's Fund, The Redstone Acceleration & Innovation Network (TRAIN) initiative from FasterCures, the Asian Venture Philanthropy Network (AVPN), Social Ventures Australia (SVA) in Australia, the danone communities, and the European Venture Philanthropy Association (EVPA).

=== Cystic Fibrosis Foundation ===
In the late 1990s the Bethesda-based Cystic Fibrosis Foundation (CFF), wanting to take more direct action toward finding treatments for cystic fibrosis (CF) beyond its traditional approach of funding basic research at universities, invested in a small California biotechnology firm to help fund the discovery and development of the drug that twenty years later (January 2012) was approved as Kalydeco. Unlike other available drugs that addressed symptoms of CF, the drug candidate was intended to address the underlying cause of CF. The company in which CFF invested was Aurora Biosciences; CFF provided $30 million for Aurora to identify and develop up to three drug candidates. The unusual nature of the arrangement was widely noted.

In 2001, Aurora was acquired by Vertex Pharmaceuticals, but CFF continued to fund development of the CF drug candidates. That funding eventually grew to $150 million, much of which was raised for the CFF by Joe O'Donnell, a Boston businessman whose son died of CF.

When Vertex started selling Kalydeco, it priced it at about $300,000 per year and promised to provide it free of charge to anyone in the US who was uninsured or whose insurance would not cover it. It justified the price—one of the highest in the world for any drug—by explaining that on the one hand, that it can only treat about 4% of CF patients, or about 3,000 people worldwide; as it was only approved for adults and children six and older, there are only about 2,400 people eligible to receive it; with that few people, it needed a high price to pay for the research to create it as well as its other programs, which include a drug candidate that could treat many more people with CF. It also highlighted the drug's strong efficacy and outlined the costs of managing CF that would be saved for people the drug could treat; those costs include repeated hospitalizations and lung transplants.

Nonetheless, the high price led to sharp criticism of Vertex and the CFF. Twenty-nine physicians and scientists working with people with cystic fibrosis wrote to the CEO of Vertex Pharmaceuticals to plead for lower prices.

CFF invested in exchange for a promise of royalties paid on sales of any drug it funded that made it to market; in 2014 it sold the future royalty stream to Royalty Pharma, a royalty fund investment company, for $3.3 billion, and said that it would use the funds to invest yet more in research and clinical trials for cystic fibrosis treatments.

In the course of working out the deal with Aurora in 2000, CFF included a clause in the agreement allowing it to take control of the intellectual property if Aurora stopped developing any discovered drug. CFF struck a similar agreement with the company Altus Pharmaceuticals to fund the development of a recombinant enzyme that could treat pancreatic disease in people with cystic fibrosis. When Altus reported to CFF that it lacked funds to continue developing the drug, CFF seized control of the asset and eventually licensed it to Alnara Pharmaceuticals, which further developed the drug and was acquired by Eli Lilly in 2010.

== Criticism of venture philanthropy in education ==
UW-Madison Professor Emeritus Kenneth Zeichner wrote a paper criticizing the role of the NewSchools Venture Fund in bringing deregulation and market-based practices into schools in the US. Lois Weiner writing in Jacobin criticized teachers' unions for taking money from the Gates Foundation. Others have argued that venture philanthropy often suffers from a lack of accountability, with projects prioritized more for their measurable metrics than for genuine long-term change, leading to a cycle of publicity-driven initiatives, in particular in education, that fail to address the underlying systemic issues facing society.

== See also ==
- Effective altruism
- Impact investment
- Philanthrocapitalism
