= Soul train =

Soul train may refer to:

- Soul Train (1970–2006), an African-American music and dance television show
- "Soul Train", a song by YBN Nahmir from his 2021 album Visionland
- Soul Train Music Awards, annual music awards for African-American music, spun off from the American TV show
- The Soul Train Gang, the dance troupe established by the American TV show
- Soul Train Records, an American record label for African-American music
- Soul Train Radio, a British radio station for soul music
- "Soul Train" Jones, pro wrestler

== See also ==
- Soultrane, a 1958 jazz album by John Coltrane
- "Soultrane", a 1957 jazz tune by Tadd Dameron from the album Mating Call
- Train (disambiguation)
- Soul (disambiguation)
