= Train (disambiguation) =

A train is a form of rail transport comprising a series of connected vehicles that usually run along a rail track to transport cargo or passengers.

Train(s) may also refer to:

== Transport ==
- Roller coaster train, the specialized vehicle which transports riders around a roller coaster track
- Camel train, a series of camels carrying goods or passengers in a group
- Overland train, a type of oversized semi-trailer truck that could travel over most terrain
- Road train, a truck design used in remote areas of Australia to move bulky loads efficiently
- Trackless train, a road-going articulated vehicle
- Wagon train, a group of wagons traveling together, especially the American West

== Science and technology ==
- Train (unidentified sound), one of six unidentified sounds recorded by the U.S. National Oceanic and Atmospheric Administration
- Gear train, an interconnected series of gears in a machine
  - Wheel train, the gear train of a mechanical watch or clock
- LNG train, a natural gas liquefaction unit
- Print train, on a train printer
- Software release train, a concept in software engineering
- Wave train, a finite burst of wave action that travels as a unit

== Arts, entertainment, and media ==
=== Games ===
- Train (board game), a board game by Brenda Romero
- Trainz, a railroad-operations simulation video game

=== Music ===
- Train (band), an American rock band
- Train (album), their debut album
- "Train", scene 1 from the first act of the opera Einstein on the Beach, composed by Philip Glass

==== Songs ====
- "Train" (3 Doors Down song), 2008
- "Train" (Goldfrapp song), 2003
- "Train", by 4 Non Blondes from Bigger, Better, Faster, More!, 1992
- "Train", by the Bats from Couchmaster, 1995
- "Train", by Brick + Mortar, 2015
- "Train", by Ketsumeishi, 2007
- "Train", by Lagwagon from Let's Talk About Feelings, 1998
- "Train", by Nitro Nitra, representing Delaware in the American Song Contest, 2022
- "Train", by P-Model from Perspective, 1992
- "Train", by Red Box from Motive, 1990
- "Train", by Uncle Tupelo from No Depression, 1990
- "Trains", by Nav from Emergency Tsunami, 2020
- "Trains", by Porcupine Tree from In Absentia, 2002
- "Trains", by the Vapors from New Clear Days, 1980

=== Other arts, entertainment, and media ===
- Train (2008 film), an American horror film
- Train (2026 film), an upcoming Indian Tamil-language action thriller film
- Train, working title of the 2007 Indian romantic comedy film Jab We Met
- Trains (magazine), a magazine devoted to trains and railroads
- Train Heartnet, a fictional character in the anime series Black Cat
- "Trains", a monologue by Reginald Gardiner
- Train (TV series), a 2020 South Korean television series
- "Trains" (Bluey), a 2020 television episode
- "Train" (Not Going Out), a 2023 television episode
- Trains (mural), a mural in Columbus, Ohio

== Legislation ==
- Tax Reform for Acceleration and Inclusion Law (TRAIN Law), a legislation which made reforms on taxation in the Philippines
- Transparency in Regulatory Analysis of Impacts on the Nation Act (TRAIN Act), U.S. House legislation sponsored by John Sullivan

== Other uses ==
- The Redstone Acceleration & Innovation Network (TRAIN), a medical research organization
- Train, Bavaria, a town in Bavaria, Germany
- Train (clothing), the long back portion of a skirt or dress that trails on the ground behind the wearer
- Train (military), the supply and support units of an army
- Train, the male peafowl's elongated upper tail covert feathers as used in display
- Train, or to "run a train", the process of multiple men having sexual intercourse with a single female, with little to no breaks between "sessions"; this is often a form of gang rape
- Whale oil, historically called train or train oil

== See also ==
- Powertrain, the components that generate and deliver power for a vehicle
- Soul Train
- The Train (disambiguation)
- Train Train (disambiguation)
- Training, the acquisition of useful knowledge and skills through instruction
- Trane (disambiguation)
