= R07 =

R07 can refer to:

- HMS Albion (R07)
- ATC code R07
- HMS Ark Royal (R07)
