= Silver Train =

Silver Train or Silvertrain may refer to:

- Silver Train (horse), a racehorse that once won the Breeders' Cup Sprint
- Spanish Silver Train, a mule convoy which crossed Panama
- The Silver Train of Stockholm, a ghost train in the Stockholm Metro

== Music ==
- Silver Train (song), a song by the Rolling Stones
- Silver Train, a song by East Village (band)

== See also ==
- Trem de Prata (Portuguese: Silver Train); see Rail transport in Brazil
- Silver Line (disambiguation), for train lines that are Silver
- Train (disambiguation)
- Silver (disambiguation)
