= Michael J. Welsh (biologist) =

American pulmonologist

- Born: Michael James Welsh; Marshalltown, Iowa
- Education: University of Iowa (BSc, MD)
- Known for: Research of cystic fibrosis
- Awards: Warren Alpert Foundation Prize (2018); George M. Kober Medal (2020); Shaw Prize in Life Science & Medicine (2022); Wiley Prize (2023); Switzer Prize (2023)
- Scientific career
- Fields: Pulmonology, physiology
- Workplaces: University of California, San Francisco; University of Texas, Houston; University of Iowa; Howard Hughes Medical Institute

Michael James Welsh is an American pulmonologist. He is the current Roy J. Carver Chair in Biomedical Research, the Professor of Internal Medicine in Pulmonary, Critical Care and Occupational Medicine at the Department of Internal Medicine, and the Director of Pappajohn Biomedical Institute, Roy J. and Lucille A. Carver College of Medicine, University of Iowa. He is also a professor at the Department of Neurosurgery, Department of Neurology, and Department of Molecular Physiology and Biophysics. He received the 2022 Shaw Prize in Life science and Medicine, together with Paul A. Negulescu, for their work that uncovered the physiological defects in cystic fibrosis and developed effective medications. He also received the 2025 Lasker Award.

== Early life and education ==
Welsh was born and raised in Marshalltown, Iowa, and went to Loras College in Dubuque. He obtained his BSc from the University of Iowa, then his MD from College of Medicine of the same university (now the Roy J. and Lucille A. Carver College of Medicine) in 1974. He completed his residency in Internal Medicine at the University of Iowa Hospitals and Clinics, during which the attending physicians supervising him induced his interest in research.

== Career ==
After his residency, Welsh spent 2 years at the University of California, San Francisco and then University of Texas Medical School at Houston as a research fellow, returning to the University of Iowa in 1981 and becoming an assistant professor in the Department of Internal Medicine, eventually promoted to Professor of Internal Medicine and Professor of Molecular Physiology and Biophysics.

Welsh was the President of the American Society for Clinical Investigation between 1996 and 1997, and has been the President of the Association of American Physicians. Currently, Welsh is an investigator at the Howard Hughes Medical Institute (since 1989) and sits on the Scientific Advisory Board of the Harrington Discovery Institute at University Hospitals Cleveland Medical Center.

== Research ==
Welsh's research centered on cystic fibrosis, specifically the CFTR protein, an ion channel that allows chloride ions to pass through. His studies helped answer questions about why defects in the protein emerge and how these defects affect the protein's function. In 1989, Lap-Chee Tsui, Francis Collins, and their team discovered the gene that encodes the CFTR protein and found that changes in the protein caused cystic fibrosis. Welsh's group discovered in 1991 that the CFTR protein is a chloride channel, meaning it allows chloride ions to pass across the cell membrane. The same year, his group reported how the activity of the CFTR protein could be regulated. He later categorized the four classes of CFTR mutations that are still in use today in an expanded format. Crucially, Welsh and his group found that when the CFTR protein contains F508del mutation, the most common mutation in cystic fibrosis patients, it could be transported to the cell surface under low temperature but not at body temperature. His study also showed F508del-mutated CFTR protein can function properly if it reached cell surface, paving the way for cystic fibrosis therapies. In recent years, Welsh has developed animal models of cystic fibrosis, most notably in pigs, allowing for the study of the disease in an in vivo setting.

== Honors and awards ==
- 1994 - James Burns Amberson Lecture, American Thoracic Society
- 1997 - Member of the National Academy of Medicine
- 1998 - Member of the American Academy of Arts and Sciences
- 2000 - Member of the National Academy of Sciences
- 2009 - Gordon Wilson Medal, American Clinical and Climatological Association
- 2017 - Walter B. Cannon Award Lectureship, American Physiological Society
- 2017 - Steven C. Beering Award, Indiana University School of Medicine
- 2018 - Warren Alpert Foundation Prize
- 2020 - George M. Kober Medal
- 2022 - Shaw Prize in Life Science & Medicine
- 2023 - Wiley Prize
- 2023 - Switzer Prize
