= The Billion-Dollar Molecule =

Book by Barry Werth

- Paperback edition
- Author: Barry Werth
- Language: English
- Subject: Biotechnology
- Genre: Non-fiction
- Publisher: Simon & Schuster
- Publication date: February 16, 1994
- Publication place: United States
- Pages: 448 pp. (hardcover)
- ISBN: 0-671-51057-6

The Billion-Dollar Molecule is a book by journalist Barry Werth about the founding and early research efforts of the American biotechnology company Vertex Pharmaceuticals, which was founded in 1989 by Joshua Boger and was among the first biotechnology companies to adopt an explicit strategy of rational drug design as opposed to techniques based on combinatorial chemistry.

This book is notable as an inside look at a biotechnology company, and the stresses and marketing pressures on funding research into drug design. This book is a mixture of finance and technology.

In February, 2014, Barry Werth published a follow-on book, The Antidote, that looks at Vertex 20 years later after his original effort.
