= Lumacaftor/ivacaftor =

Cystic fibrosis drug

Combination of
- Lumacaftor: CFTR chaperone
- Ivacaftor: CFTR potentiator

Clinical data
- Trade names: Orkambi, Lucaftor
- AHFS/Drugs.com: Monograph
- MedlinePlus: a615037
- License data: US DailyMed: Orkambi
- Pregnancy category: AU: B3
- Routes of administration: By mouth
- ATC code: R07AX30 (WHO)

Legal status
- Legal status: AU: S4 (Prescription only); CA: ℞-only; UK: POM (Prescription only); US: ℞-only; EU: Rx-only

Identifiers
- CAS Number: 1815566-23-4
- KEGG: D10685

Lumacaftor/ivacaftor, sold under the brand name Orkambi among others, is a combination of lumacaftor and ivacaftor used to treat people with cystic fibrosis who have two copies of the F508del mutation. It is unclear if it is useful in cystic fibrosis due to other causes. It is taken by mouth.

Common side effects include shortness of breath, nausea, diarrhea, feeling tired, hearing problems, and rash. Severe side effects may include liver problems and cataracts. Ivacaftor increases the activity of the CFTR protein, while lumacaftor improves protein folding of the CFTR protein.

It was approved for medical use in the United States in 2015, and in Canada in 2016. In the United States it costs more than US$22,000 a month as of 2018. While its use was not recommended in the United Kingdom as of 2018, pricing was agreed upon in 2019 and it is expected to be covered by November of that year.

== Medical uses ==
The combination of lumacaftor/ivacaftor is used to treat people with cystic fibrosis who have two copies of the F508del mutation in the cystic fibrosis transmembrane conductance regulator (CFTR), the defective protein that causes the disease. This genetic abnormality is present in about half of cystic fibrosis cases in Canada. Its use is not recommended for anyone with cystic fibrosis in the United Kingdom as of 2018.

While the medication resulted in improvement in the amount of air a person can breathe out in one second, the improvement seen did not reach a clinically important amount. The medication also does not appear to change a person's quality of life or the number of times a year a person has a worsening of lung function. Effects on life expectancy are unclear.

== Side effects ==
Some people taking the combination drug had elevated transaminases; the combination drug should be used with caution for people with advanced liver disease and liver function should be measured for the first three months for all people starting the combination drug.

People starting the combination have respiratory discomfort, and some children taking the combination drug developed cataracts.

Lumacaftor/ivacaftor may interfere with hormonal contraceptives. Dosage of the combination drug should be reduced if the person is taking a drug that inhibits CYP3A, and inducers of CYP3A should not be used concomitantly.

== Mechanism of action ==
F508del is a mutation that causes the CFTR protein to misfold and cells destroy such proteins soon after they are made; lumacaftor acts as a chaperone during protein folding and increases the number of CFTR proteins that are trafficked to the cell surface. Ivacaftor is a potentiator of CFTR that is already at the cell surface, increasing the probability that the defective channel will be open and allow chloride ions to pass through the channel pore. The two drugs have synergistic effects.

== Physical properties ==
Each of lumacaftor and ivacaftor is a white to off-white powder that is practically insoluble in water. The combination drug is a single pill containing 200 mg of lumacaftor and 125 mg of ivacaftor.

== History ==
Lumacaftor/ivacaftor was approved by the FDA in July 2015, under breakthrough therapy status and under a priority review. Previously approved for adults and pre-teens, approved in 2018 for children age 2–5. In 2022 it was approved for children age 1–2.

== Society and culture ==
As of March 2016, the combination drug cost US$259,000 per year in the United States.

In Denmark, it was estimated in August 2015, that if the drug were introduced, the cost would amount to 2 million Danish krones (approximately 270,000 euro) each year per person.

The Dutch Minister of Health announced in October 2017 that the drug would not be admitted to the public health insurance package, making it impossible to have treatment with the drug covered by Dutch health insurance. The minister stated that the price for the drug, negotiated to 170,000 euro per patient per year, is "unacceptably high in relation to the relatively modest effect, as determined by the (Dutch) Healthcare Institute". Approximately 750 patients are affected by this decision. On 25 October, the Dutch Minister of Health announced that an agreement had been brokered with Vertex Pharmaceuticals, the company that manufactures the drug, resulting in admittance to the Dutch public health insurance package. Part of the agreement is that the result of the negotiation about the price of the treatment will not be disclosed.

NHS Scotland and NHS England both struck deals with Vertex in 2019. This followed discussions where Vertex wanted £105 000 per person for Orkambi.
