= Vanzacaftor/tezacaftor/deutivacaftor =

Deuterated cystic fibrosis drug (ivacaftor analogue)

Combination of
- Vanzacaftor: Medication
- Tezacaftor: Medication
- Deutivacaftor: CFTR potentiator

Clinical data
- Trade names: Alyftrek
- AHFS/Drugs.com: Monograph
- MedlinePlus: a625066
- License data: US DailyMed: Vanzacaftor, tezacaftor, and deutivacaftor
- Routes of administration: By mouth
- ATC code: R07AX33 (WHO)

Legal status
- Legal status: CA: ℞-only; US: ℞-only; EU: Rx-only

Identifiers
- KEGG: D13024

Vanzacaftor/tezacaftor/deutivacaftor, sold under the brand name Alyftrek, is a fixed-dose combination medication used for the treatment of cystic fibrosis. It is a combination of deutivacaftor, a CFTR potentiator; tezacaftor; and vanzacaftor, as the calcium salt, vanzacaftor calcium dihydrate. It is taken by mouth.

The combination was approved for medical use in the United States in December 2024, in the European Union in June 2025, and in Canada in July 2025.

== Medical uses ==
The combination is indicated for the treatment of cystic fibrosis in people aged six years of age and older who have at least one F508del mutation or another responsive mutation in the cystic fibrosis transmembrane conductance regulator (CFTR) gene.

== Adverse effects ==
The US Food and Drug Administration (FDA) prescription label for the combination contains a boxed warning about drug-induced liver injury and liver failure.

== History ==
The US Food and Drug Administration (FDA) granted the application for vanzacaftor, tezacaftor, and deutivacaftor combination therapy orphan drug designation.

== Society and culture ==
=== Legal status ===
The combination was approved for medical use in the United States in December 2024.

In April 2025, the Committee for Medicinal Products for Human Use of the European Medicines Agency adopted a positive opinion, recommending the granting of a marketing authorization for the medicinal product Alyftrek, intended for the treatment of cystic fibrosis in people aged six years of age and older who have at least one non‑class I mutation in the cystic fibrosis transmembrane conductance regulator (CFTR) gene. The applicant for this medicinal product is Vertex Pharmaceuticals (Ireland) Limited. The combination was authorized for medical use in the European Union in June 2025.

=== Names ===
The combination is sold under the brand name Alyftrek.
