= The Train =

The Train may refer to:

== Films ==
- The Train (1964 film), an American war film starring Burt Lancaster and Paul Scofield
- The Train (1970 film), an Indian Hindi suspense film
- The Train (1973 film), a Franco–Italian war film
- The Train, working title of the 2007 Indian Hindi film Jab We Met
- The Train (2007 film), an Indian Hindi thriller
- The Train (2011 film), an Indian Malayalam thriller
- The Train (2025 film), a Canadian drama film directed by Marie Brassard

== Games ==
- The Train: Escape to Normandy, a 1988 action video game based on the 1964 film (see above)
- The Train Game, a 1983 train simulation video game

== Literature ==
- "The Train" (short story), a 1947 story by Flannery O'Connor
- The Train (Russian: Sputniki, Fellow Travellers), a 1949 novel by Vera Panova
- The Train (French: Le train), a 1961 novel by Georges Simenon

== Music ==
- "The Train" (song), a song by OutKast
- "The Train", a song by Ray Charles, the B-side of "Let's Go Get Stoned"
- "The Train", a song by Macklemore & Ryan Lewis from This Unruly Mess I've Made
- "The Train", a song by Frankie Miller from Double Trouble
- "The Train", a song by Irving Berlin
- "The Train", a 1969 song by 1910 Fruitgum Company
- "C'mon N' Ride It (The Train)", a song by Quad City DJ's

== Television ==
- "The Train" (Date with the Angels)
- "The Train" (Dr. Quinn, Medicine Woman)
- "The Train" (Mission: Impossible)
- "The Train" (XIII: The Series)

== See also ==
- Train (disambiguation)
