= Train Train =

Train Train may refer to:

- Train+Train, a 2000 Japanese light novel series
- Train*Train, a manga by Eiki Eiki
- "Train, Train", a song by Blackfoot
- "Train, Train" (The Count Bishops song), 1976
- Train-Train (album), an album by The Blue Hearts
- "Train-Train", a song by The Blue Hearts
