= Mepixanox =

Chemical compound

Clinical data
- ATC code: R07AB09 (WHO)

Identifiers
- IUPAC name: 3-Methoxy-4-(piperidin-1-ylmethyl)-9H-xanthen-9-one
- CAS Number: 17854-59-0
- PubChem CID: 65687
- ChemSpider: 59116
- UNII: 7419T4YQQW
- KEGG: D07410
- ChEMBL: ChEMBL2104462
- CompTox Dashboard (EPA): DTXSID90170504
- ECHA InfoCard: 100.037.994

Chemical and physical data
- Formula: C_{20}H_{21}NO_{3}
- Molar mass: 323.392 g·mol^{−1}
- 3D model (JSmol): Interactive image
- SMILES: COC1=C(C2=C(C=C1)C(=O)C3=CC=CC=C3O2)CN4CCCCC4
- InChI: InChI=1S/C20H21NO3/c1-23-17-10-9-15-19(22)14-7-3-4-8-18(14)24-20(15)16(17)13-21-11-5-2-6-12-21/h3-4,7-10H,2,5-6,11-13H2,1H3; Key:PYSOHOOUXFWCFF-UHFFFAOYSA-N

Mepixanox (Pimexone) is a respiratory stimulant (analeptic). According to the primary source, it is stated to be a central nervous system stimulant, which is an endemic/inherent property of many of the analeptic drugs.
