= Elexacaftor =

Cystic fibrosis medication

Clinical data
- Trade names: Trikafta and Kaftrio (with ivacaftor and tezacaftor)
- Other names: VX-445
- AHFS/Drugs.com: Monograph
- MedlinePlus: a619061
- License data: EU EMA: by INN; US DailyMed: Elexacaftor
- Routes of administration: By mouth
- ATC code: None

Legal status
- Legal status: AU: S4 (Prescription only); US: ℞-only; EU: Rx-only

Identifiers
- IUPAC name: N-(1,3-dimethylpyrazol-4-yl)sulfonyl-6-[3-(3,3,3-trifluoro-2,2-dimethylpropoxy)pyrazol-1-yl]-2-[(4S)-2,2,4-trimethylpyrrolidin-1-yl]pyridine-3-carboxamide
- CAS Number: 2216712-66-0
- PubChem CID: 134587348
- DrugBank: DB15444
- ChemSpider: 75531299
- UNII: RRN67GMB0V
- KEGG: D11507
- ChEMBL: ChEMBL4298128
- CompTox Dashboard (EPA): DTXSID901027907

Chemical and physical data
- Formula: C_{26}H_{34}F_{3}N_{7}O_{4}S
- Molar mass: 597.66 g·mol^{−1}
- 3D model (JSmol): Interactive image
- SMILES: Cc1nn(C)cc1S(=O)(=O)NC(=O)c1ccc(-n2ccc(OCC(C)(C)C(F)(F)F)n2)nc1N1C[C@@H](C)CC1(C)C
- InChI: InChI=1S/C26H34F3N7O4S/c1-16-12-25(5,6)35(13-16)22-18(23(37)33-41(38,39)19-14-34(7)31-17(19)2)8-9-20(30-22)36-11-10-21(32-36)40-15-24(3,4)26(27,28)29/h8-11,14,16H,12-13,15H2,1-7H3,(H,33,37)/t16-/m0/s1; Key:MVRHVFSOIWFBTE-INIZCTEOSA-N

Elexacaftor is a medication that acts as cystic fibrosis transmembrane conductance regulator (CFTR) corrector, which means that it helps the CFTR protein fold correctly, increasing the amount of CFTR protein sent to the cell surface. It also appears to work as a CFTR potentiator, which means that it helps open any CFTR channel that have made its way onto the cell surface.

It is available in a single pill with ivacaftor and tezacaftor; the fixed-dose combination, elexacaftor/tezacaftor/ivacaftor (brand name Trikafta), is used to treat people with cystic fibrosis who are homozygous for the f508del mutation. This combination was approved for medical use in the United States in 2019.

The fixed-dose combination elexacaftor/tezacaftor/ivacaftor (Kaftrio) was approved for medical use in the European Union in August 2020, for the treatment of cystic fibrosis.
