= Soul Train Radio =

Soul Train Radio is a radio station that plays soul music & all sub-genres in the United Kingdom, broadcasting to South West England on DAB & online.

== History ==
Soul Train started out as regular club nights in the South West England.

=== Launch ===
It started broadcasting on Wednesday 6 December 2017

== Presenters ==
- Al Bendall
- Arnie
- Brova Nick
- Chris Gallion
- Darren Thorne
- Dave Forde
- Fitzroy Facey
- Jamie Joyce
- Jez Kelsall
- Jimmy Swing
- Lady C
- MAC 3
- Mike Ashley
- Mike Vitti
- Miranda Rae
- Nick Soul Funk
- Paul Conroy
- Paul Mallon
- Phil Baker
- Ricky 2 Tuff
- Riddim Ryda
- Rodney "In The Mix"
- Ronnie Herel
- Stoney
- Tony Griffin
- Tristan B
