= The Redstone Acceleration & Innovation Network =

Medical research organization

- Abbreviation: TRAIN
- Formation: 2004
- Founder: FasterCures
- Type: nonprofit organization

The Redstone Acceleration & Innovation Network (TRAIN) is an organization launched by FasterCures in 2004 established to create opportunities for medical research organizations to discuss and overcome research challenges that cut across all diseases. TRAIN brings together nonprofit disease research organizations to share information, as well as promote collaboration and innovation in disease research. Headed by FasterCures, TRAIN asserts that collaboration is crucial for efficient biomedical advancement. Participating researchers discuss successes, failures, and best practices that provide lessons learned and valuable ideas that could be scaled up to amplify productivity.

Originally named “The Research Acceleration & Innovation Network,” TRAIN was renamed to “The Redstone Acceleration & Innovation Network” in order to honor a generous grant contribution from Sumner Redstone and the Sumner M. Redstone Charitable Foundation.

== Participating research organizations ==
- Accelerate Brain Cancer Cure
- Accelerated Cure Project for Multiple Sclerosis
- Alliance for Aging Research
- Alpha-1 Foundation
- ALS Therapy Development Institute
- Autism Speaks
- Ben & Catherine Ivy Foundation
- Bonnie J. Addario Lung Cancer Foundation
- Cure Alzheimer's Fund
- CureDuchenne
- Cystic Fibrosis Foundation
- The Epilepsy Therapy Development Project
- FastForward, LLC (National MS Society)
- Focused Ultrasound Surgery Foundation
- Foundation Fighting Blindness
- Foundation for Accelerated Vascular Research
- Hydrocephalus Association
- Institute for OneWorld Health
- International AIDS Vaccine Initiative
- Juvenile Diabetes Research Foundation
- Lance Armstrong Foundation
- Leukemia & Lymphoma Society
- Life Raft Group
- Lymphoma Research Foundation
- Melanoma Research Alliance
- Michael J. Fox Foundation for Parkinson's Research
- MPD Foundation
- Multiple Myeloma Research Foundation
- Myelin Repair Foundation
- Pancreatic Cancer Action Network
- Parkinson's Action Network
- Prostate Cancer Foundation
- Susan G. Komen for the Cure
- TGen
