= Dimefline =

Chemical compound

Clinical data
- AHFS/Drugs.com: International Drug Names
- ATC code: R07AB08 (WHO)

Identifiers
- IUPAC name: 8-(dimethylaminomethyl)-7-methoxy-3-methyl-2-phenylchromen-4-one
- CAS Number: 1165-48-6
- PubChem CID: 3078
- ChemSpider: 2969
- UNII: 9WII5M0DU3
- KEGG: D07847
- ChEMBL: ChEMBL519364
- CompTox Dashboard (EPA): DTXSID0048268
- ECHA InfoCard: 100.013.288

Chemical and physical data
- Formula: C_{20}H_{21}NO_{3}
- Molar mass: 323.392 g·mol^{−1}
- 3D model (JSmol): Interactive image
- SMILES: O=C\1c3c(O/C(=C/1C)c2ccccc2)c(c(OC)cc3)CN(C)C
- InChI: InChI=1S/C20H21NO3/c1-13-18(22)15-10-11-17(23-4)16(12-21(2)3)20(15)24-19(13)14-8-6-5-7-9-14/h5-11H,12H2,1-4H3; Key:ZXFQRFXLFWWKLX-UHFFFAOYSA-N

Dimefline is a respiratory stimulant.
