= Trane (disambiguation) =

Trane is an American HVAC (heating, ventilation and air conditioning) systems and controls manufacturer.

Trane may also refer to:

- SK Trane, a Norwegian football (soccer) club
- Trane, a neighbourhood of Kristiansand, Norway
- John Coltrane (1926–1967), nicknamed "Trane", American jazz saxophonist, composer and bandleader
- Trane, a fictional character in the video game Marc Eckō's Getting Up: Contents Under Pressure
- Trane, a 1969 painting by William T. Williams
- "Trane", a song by Gov't Mule from the album Gov't Mule, the title derived from John Coltrane's nickname

== People with the surname ==
- James Trane (1857-1936), Norwegian-American businessperson, co-founder of Trane, Inc.
- Reuben Trane (1886–1954), American businessperson, son of James and co-founder of Trane, Inc.
- Thomas Trane, Danish freelance photographer
