= Tezacaftor =

Chemical compound

Clinical data
- Other names: VX-661
- License data: US DailyMed: Tezacaftor
- ATC code: R07AX31 (WHO), R07AX32 (WHO), R07AX33 (WHO)

Identifiers
- IUPAC name: 1-(2,2-Difluoro-1,3-benzodioxol-5-yl)-N-[1-[(2R)-2,3-dihydroxypropyl]-6-fluoro-2-(2-hydroxy-1,1-dimethylethyl)-1H-indol-5-yl]-cyclopropanecarboxamide
- CAS Number: 1152311-62-0
- PubChem CID: 46199646
- DrugBank: DB11712
- ChemSpider: 28637762
- UNII: 8RW88Y506K
- KEGG: D11041
- CompTox Dashboard (EPA): DTXSID40673070

Chemical and physical data
- Formula: C_{26}H_{27}F_{3}N_{2}O_{6}
- Molar mass: 520.505 g·mol^{−1}
- 3D model (JSmol): Interactive image
- SMILES: CC(C)(CO)c1cc2cc(NC(=O)C3(c4ccc5c(c4)OC(F)(F)O5)CC3)c(F)cc2n1C[C@@H](O)CO
- InChI: InChI=1S/C26H27F3N2O6/c1-24(2,13-33)22-8-14-7-18(17(27)10-19(14)31(22)11-16(34)12-32)30-23(35)25(5-6-25)15-3-4-20-21(9-15)37-26(28,29)36-20/h3-4,7-10,16,32-34H,5-6,11-13H2,1-2H3,(H,30,35)/t16-/m1/s1; Key:MJUVRTYWUMPBTR-MRXNPFEDSA-N

Tezacaftor is a medication used for the treatment of cystic fibrosis. It is available in fixed-dose combination medications.

The combination of tezacaftor with ivacaftor (brand name Symdeko) was approved for medical use in the United States in February 2018, and in Canada in June 2018. As brand name Symkevi it was approved for medical use in the European Union in October 2018.

The combination of tezacaftor with elexacaftor and ivacaftor (brand name Trikafta) was approved for medical use in the United States in October 2019, and in Canada in June 2021. As brand name Kaftrio it was approved for medical use in the European Union in August 2020.

The combination of tezacaftor with vanzacaftor and deutivacaftor (brand name Alyftrek) was approved for medical use in the United States in December 2024.

== Mechanism of action ==
Tezacaftor acts as a corrector to help the folding and presentation of the CFTR protein to the cell surface, which improves its function for individuals with a F508del mutation.

== Clinical trials ==
The EVOLVE and EXPAND study findings were published in 2017.

=== EVOLVE trial ===
The EVOLVE trial analyzed tezacaftor/ivacaftor in participants with cystic fibrosis, specifically with the homozygous for Phe508del mutation. The EVOLVE trial is a phase 3, double-blinded, multicenter, randomized, placebo-controlled, parallel-group trial, that was which evaluated therapy with a combination of tezacaftor and ivacaftor in participants that are aged 12 years of age and older.

510 participants were randomized and 509 participants were given either 100 mg of tezacaftor once daily and 150 mg of ivacaftor twice daily or a placebo for 24 weeks. The combination of drugs was efficacious in participants who had cystic fibrosis with the Phe508del mutation and the adverse effects in both treatment groups were similar.

== History ==
The US Food and Drug Administration (FDA) granted the application for tezacaftor and ivacaftor combination therapy orphan drug and priority review designations, and granted the approval of Symdeko to Vertex Pharmaceuticals. The European Medicines Agency (EMA) designated the combination an orphan medicine.

The FDA and the EMA granted the application for elexacaftor, tezacaftor, and ivacaftor combination therapy an orphan drug designation.

The FDA granted the application for vanzacaftor, tezacaftor, and deutivacaftor combination therapy an orphan drug designation.

== Society and culture ==
=== Names ===
Tezacaftor is the international nonproprietary name.
