= ATC code R07 =

ATC code R07 Other respiratory system products is a therapeutic subgroup of the Anatomical Therapeutic Chemical Classification System, a system of alphanumeric codes developed by the World Health Organization (WHO) for the classification of drugs and other medical products. Subgroup R07 is part of the anatomical group R Respiratory system.

Codes for veterinary use (ATCvet codes) can be created by placing the letter Q in front of the human ATC code: for example, QR07. ATCvet codes without corresponding human ATC codes are cited with the leading Q in the following list.
National versions of the ATC classification may include additional codes not present in this list, which follows the WHO version.

== R07A Other respiratory system products ==
=== R07AA Lung surfactants ===
R07AA01 Colfosceril palmitate
R07AA02 Natural phospholipids
R07AA30 Combinations

=== R07AB Respiratory stimulants ===
R07AB01 Doxapram
R07AB02 Nikethamide
R07AB03 Pentetrazol
R07AB04 Etamivan
R07AB05 Bemegride
R07AB06 Prethcamide
R07AB07 Almitrine
R07AB08 Dimefline
R07AB09 Mepixanox
R07AB52 Nikethamide, combinations
R07AB53 Pentetrazol, combinations
QR07AB99 Respiratory stimulants, combinations

=== R07AX Other respiratory system products ===
R07AX01 Nitric oxide
R07AX02 Ivacaftor
R07AX30 Ivacaftor and lumacaftor
R07AX31 Ivacaftor and tezacaftor
R07AX32 Ivacaftor, tezacaftor and elexacaftor
R07AX33 Deutivacaftor, tezacaftor and vanzacaftor
