= Cystic Fibrosis Foundation =

American non-profit organisation

- Formation: December 16, 1955; 70 years ago
- Tax ID no.: 13-1930701
- Legal status: 501(c)(3) nonprofit organization
- Purpose: Cystic fibrosis
- Headquarters: Bethesda, Maryland, United States
- Chair, Board of Trustees: Catherine C. McLoud
- President, Chief Executive Officer: Michael P. Boyle
- Chair, Adult Advisory Council: KC White
- Subsidiaries: Cystic Fibrosis Patient Assistance Foundation, Cystic Fibrosis Foundation Therapeutics
- Revenue: $192,528,975 (2016)
- Expenses: $299,650,531 (2016)
- Employees: 731 (2016)
- Volunteers: 250,000 (2016)
- Website: www.cff.org
- Formerly called: National Cystic Fibrosis Research Foundation

The Cystic Fibrosis Foundation (CFF) is a 501(c)(3) non-profit organization in the United States established to provide the means to cure cystic fibrosis (CF) and ensure that those living with CF live long and productive lives. The Foundation provides information about cystic fibrosis and finances CF research that aims to improve the quality of life for people with the disease. The Foundation also engages in legislative lobbying for cystic fibrosis.

== History ==
The Foundation was established in 1955 by a group of volunteers in Philadelphia, Pennsylvania.

In addition to providing grants for research into cystic fibrosis and supporting clinical trials, the foundation promotes and accredits 115 specialized centers for treatment of individuals with cystic fibrosis. The Foundation has over 80 chapters and offices across the United States.

Before it began using the current name, the organization was known as the "National Cystic Fibrosis Research Foundation".

In 1989, scientists working for the Cystic Fibrosis Foundation discovered the gene that causes cystic fibrosis, considered the key to developing a cure for cystic fibrosis.

From 1982 until 1999, sports journalist Frank Deford served as chairman of the Foundation.

The Cystic Fibrosis Foundation has been a pioneer of cystic fibrosis treatment, having played a major role in the development and use of five FDA-approved therapies, including ivacaftor (Kalydeco). The latest FDA approved drug is Trikafta, which was passed by the FDA in 54 days and is able to help up to 90% of CF patients.

In 2014, the Cystic Fibrosis Foundation sold the rights to the royalties of the drugs to Royalty Pharma for $3.3 billion, twenty times the Foundation's 2013 budget. This is a potential conflict of interest, as the price of Kalydeco is $300,000 per year. Critics say that the Foundation could have done more to keep the price down.

In April 2022, the Foundation announced a $5 million investment to life science treatment company Sionna Therapeutics, for the development of a new cystic fibrosis transmembrane conductance regulator (CFTR) modulators, a type of therapy that treats the underlying cause of CF.

In July 2025, the Foundation announced a $24 million investment in Prime Medicine to support the development of prime editing-based gene therapies for cystic fibrosis.

== Present day ==
Currently the Foundation operates out of Bethesda, Maryland. Michael P. Boyle is the president and CEO of the organization. At the end of 2019, Preston Campbell retired as CEO. The Foundation is devised into many different departments including Public Policy and Advocacy, Communications, and Fundraising. The Compass program is a service that provides patients and families with support for financial, legal, and insurance issues, particularly to get insurance coverage for the various medications they need to survive.

== Events ==
The Foundation hosts several philanthropic events both locally around the chapters and nationwide. One of the biggest signature events is the Great Strides walk, established in 1989. It is a sponsored walk akin to Race for the Cure, where participants walk 10 kilometers (6.2 mi) to raise money to support research for cystic fibrosis. There are Great Strides walks in over 560 locations throughout the country. Great Strides has succeeded in raising over $180,000,000 for cystic fibrosis research.

Some other signature events include the CF Cycle for Life, CF Climb, Xtreme Hike, and Team CF. The list of national events includes Ultimate Golf Experience, American Airlines Celebrity Ski, and Volunteer Leadership Conference. Individual chapters may host their own events which may include, but are not limited to, fishing events, dinner dance events, golf tournaments, and finest events.

The Foundation also hosts numerous advocacy events such as March on the Hill, state advocacy days, and Teen Advocacy Day allowing those with cystic fibrosis and their loved ones to speak their voice to those who represent them.

In 2016, the Foundation hosted its first virtual event for adults with CF, BreatheCon. The purpose of making the event virtual was to address the concerns of potential cross-infection among people living with cystic fibrosis who interact in person. Since the first BreatheCon, the Foundation has hosted several other virtual events dedicated to connecting the community, including FamilyCon and ResearchCon.
