= Cystic fibrosis transmembrane conductance regulator =

Mammalian protein found in humans

CFTR
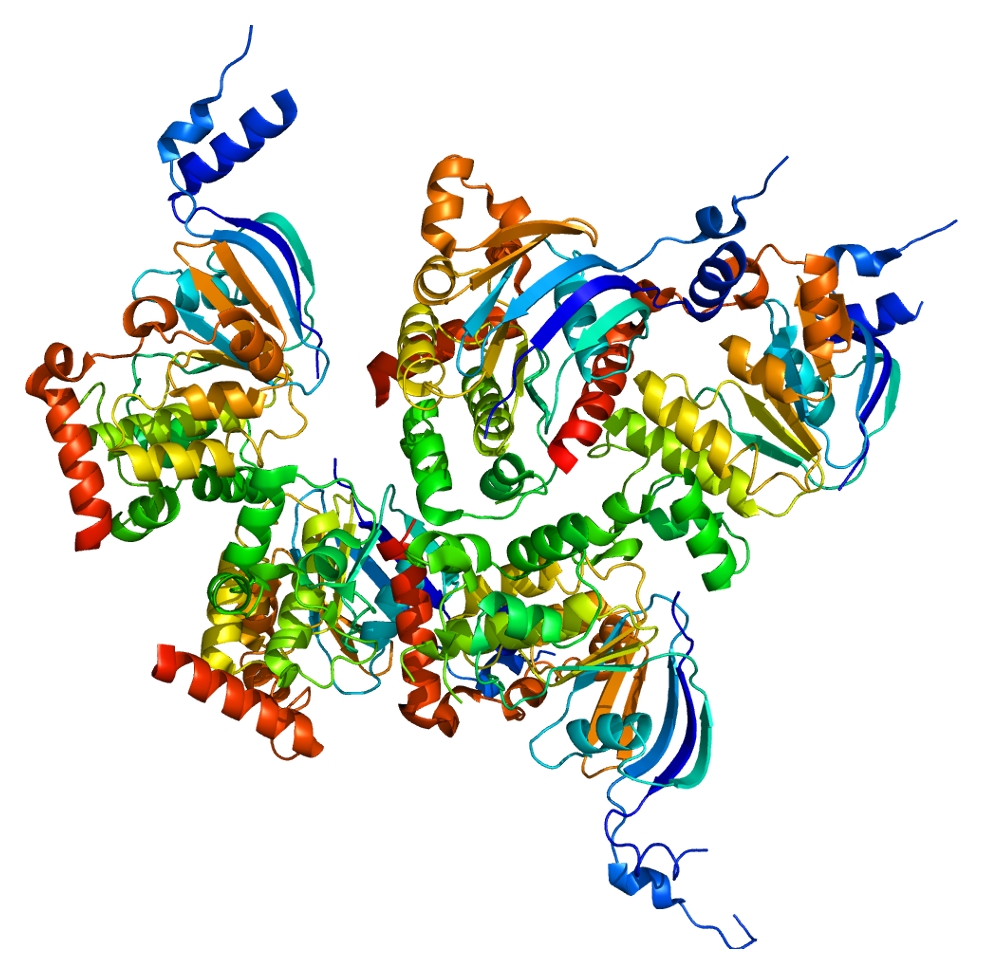
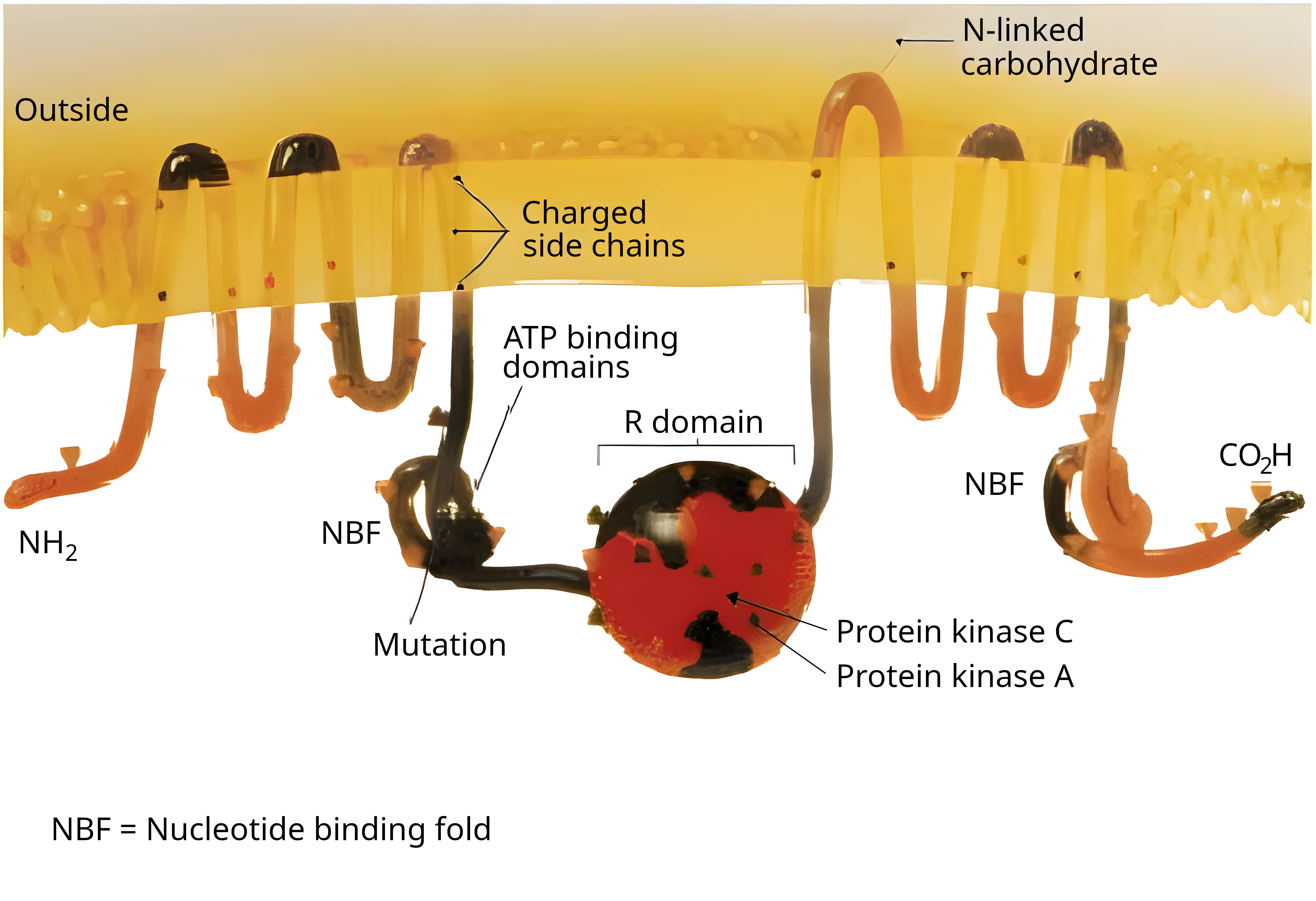

Identifiers
- Aliases: CFTR, ABC35, ABCC7, CF, CFTR/MRP, MRP7, TNR-dJ760C5.1, cystic fibrosis transmembrane conductance regulator, CF transmembrane conductance regulator
- External IDs: OMIM: 602421; MGI: 88388; GeneCards: CFTR
Available structures
PDB	Ortholog search: PDBe RCSB
PDB	List of PDB id codes 1XMI, 1XMJ, 2BBO, 2BBS, 2BBT, 2LOB, 2PZE, 2PZF, 2PZG, 3GD7, 3ISW, 4WZ6, 5D2D, 5D3E, 5D3F
Enzyme activity
EC #	BRENDA	ExPASy	KEGG	MetaCyc
5.6.1.6	↗	↗	↗	↗

Gene location (Human)
Chr.	Chromosome 7 (human)
Band	7q31.2	Start	117,287,120 bp
Band	7q31.2	End	117,715,971 bp

Gene location (Mouse)
Chr.	Chromosome 6 (mouse)
Band	6 A2|6 8.1 cM	Start	18,170,686 bp
Band	6 A2|6 8.1 cM	End	18,322,767 bp
RNA expression pattern
Bgee	Human / Mouse (ortholog); Top expressed in: body of pancreas; gallbladder; rectum; mucosa of sigmoid colon; islet of Langerhans; duodenum; mucosa of transverse colon; jejunal mucosa; C1 segment; minor salivary glands / Top expressed in: Paneth cell; epithelium of small intestine; Ileal epithelium; duodenum; left colon; crypt of lieberkuhn of small intestine; jejunum; left lung lobe; migratory enteric neural crest cell; spermatid; More reference expression data
BioGPS	n/a
Gene ontology
Molecular function	nucleotide binding; PDZ domain binding; chloride transmembrane transporter activity; protein binding; chloride channel inhibitor activity; enzyme binding; hydrolase activity; ATP binding; chloride channel activity; ATPase-coupled inorganic anion transmembrane transporter activity; chloride channel regulator activity; ATPase-coupled transmembrane transporter activity; intracellularly ATP-gated chloride channel activity; ATPase activity; bicarbonate transmembrane transporter activity; chaperone binding; Sec61 translocon complex binding; isomerase activity
Cellular component	cytoplasm; recycling endosome; endosome; early endosome membrane; membrane; plasma membrane; chloride channel complex; cell surface; lysosomal membrane; early endosome; Golgi-associated vesicle membrane; endoplasmic reticulum Sec complex; extracellular exosome; cytosol; endosome membrane; clathrin-coated vesicle membrane; integral component of membrane; apical plasma membrane; endoplasmic reticulum; endoplasmic reticulum membrane; recycling endosome membrane; integral component of plasma membrane; nucleus; protein-containing complex
Biological process	positive regulation of cyclic nucleotide-gated ion channel activity; intracellular pH elevation; membrane hyperpolarization; positive regulation of voltage-gated chloride channel activity; cholesterol transport; ion transport; vesicle docking involved in exocytosis; transmembrane transport; sperm capacitation; positive regulation of insulin secretion involved in cellular response to glucose stimulus; cholesterol biosynthetic process; positive regulation of exocytosis; chloride transport; cellular response to cAMP; protein deubiquitination; membrane organization; chloride transmembrane transport; transepithelial water transport; multicellular organismal water homeostasis; cellular response to forskolin; bicarbonate transport; transport; response to endoplasmic reticulum stress
Sources:Amigo / QuickGO
Orthologs
Databases	NCBI: entry; OMA: entry
Species	Human	Mouse
Entrez	1080	12638
Ensembl	ENSG00000001626	ENSMUSG00000041301
UniProt	P13569	P26361
RefSeq (mRNA)	NM_000492	NM_021050
RefSeq (protein)	NP_000483	NP_066388
Location (UCSC)	Chr 7: 117.29 – 117.72 Mb	Chr 6: 18.17 – 18.32 Mb
PubMed search
- Wikidata
View/Edit Human	View/Edit Mouse

Cystic fibrosis transmembrane conductance regulator (CFTR) is a membrane protein and anion channel in vertebrates that is encoded by the CFTR gene.

Geneticist Lap-Chee Tsui and his team identified the CFTR gene in 1989 as the gene linked with cystic fibrosis.

The CFTR gene codes for an ABC transporter-class ion channel protein that conducts chloride and bicarbonate ions across epithelial cell membranes. Mutations of the CFTR gene affecting anion channel function lead to dysregulation of epithelial lining fluid (mucus) transport in the lung, pancreas and other organs, resulting in cystic fibrosis. Complications include thickened mucus in the lungs with frequent respiratory infections, and pancreatic insufficiency giving rise to malnutrition and diabetes. These conditions lead to chronic disability and reduced life expectancy. In male patients, the progressive obstruction and destruction of the developing vas deferens (spermatic cord) and epididymis appear to result from abnormal intraluminal secretions, causing congenital absence of the vas deferens and male infertility, and found associated with an imbalance of fatty acids.

== Tissue and intracellular localization ==
The CFTR is found in the epithelial cells of many organs including the lung, liver, pancreas, digestive tract, and the female reproductive tract and male reproductive tract including the testis, Sertoli cells, spermatozoa. epididymis, and the vas deferens.

In the airways of the lung, CFTR is most highly expressed by rare specialized cells called pulmonary ionocytes. In the skin, CFTR is strongly expressed in the sebaceous and eccrine sweat glands. In the eccrine glands, CFTR is located on the apical membrane of the epithelial cells that make up the duct of these sweat glands.

Normally, the protein allows movement of chloride, bicarbonate and thiocyanate ions (with a negative charge) out of an epithelial cell into the airway surface liquid and mucus. Positively charged sodium ions follow passively, increasing the total electrolyte concentration in the mucus, resulting in the movement of water out of the cell via osmosis.

In epithelial cells with motile cilia lining the bronchus and the oviduct, CFTR is located on the apical cell membrane but not on cilia. In contrast, ENaC (Epithelial sodium channel) is located along the entire length of the cilia.

In sweat glands, defective CFTR results in reduced transport of sodium chloride and sodium thiocyanate in the resorptive duct and therefore saltier sweat. This is the basis of a clinically important sweat test for cystic fibrosis often used diagnostically with genetic screening.

== Gene ==
The location of the CFTR gene (in red, at q31.2) on chromosome 7

The gene that encodes the human CFTR protein is found on chromosome 7, on the long arm at position q31.2. from base pair 116,907,253 to base pair 117,095,955. CFTR orthologs occur in the jawed vertebrates.

Each individual inherits two copies of the CFTR (cystic fibrosis transmembrane conductance regulator) gene. However, some of the inherited copies have been altered. So far, the CFTR gene has been associated with over 700 distinct mutations. An individual with CF inherits two defective copies of the CFTR gene. These mutations might be heterozygous, meaning they include two different mutations, and homozygous, meaning they involve the same mutation. Delta F508 is the most common mutation, accounting for more than 70% of all mutations. Those who are homozygous for Delta F508 are commonly affected by pancreatic insufficiency.

The CFTR gene has been used in animals as a nuclear DNA phylogenetic marker. Large genomic sequences of this gene have been used to explore the phylogeny of the major groups of mammals, and confirmed the grouping of placental orders into four major clades: Xenarthra, Afrotheria, Laurasiatheria, and Euarchonta plus Glires.

=== Mutations ===
Nearly 1000 cystic fibrosis-causing mutations have been described. The most common mutation, DeltaF508 (ΔF508) primarily known as a processing mutation which results from a deletion (Δ) of three nucleotides which results in a loss of the amino acid phenylalanine (F) at the 508th position on the protein. As a result, the protein does not fold normally and is more quickly degraded. The vast majority of mutations are infrequent. The distribution and frequency of mutations varies among different populations which has implications for genetic screening and counseling.

Drug discovery for therapeutics to address CF in all patients is complicated due to a large number of disease-causing mutations. Ideally, a library of cell lines and cell-based assays corresponding to all mutants is required to screen for broadly-active drug candidates. Cell engineering methods including fluorogenic oligonucleotide signaling probes may be used to detect and isolate clonal cell lines for each mutant.

Mutations consist of replacements, duplications, deletions or shortenings in the CFTR gene. This may result in proteins that may not function, work less effectively, are more quickly degraded, or are present in inadequate numbers.

It has been hypothesized that mutations in the CFTR gene may confer a selective advantage to heterozygous individuals. Cells expressing a mutant form of the CFTR protein are resistant to invasion by the Salmonella typhi bacterium, the agent of typhoid fever, and mice carrying a single copy of mutant CFTR are resistant to diarrhea caused by cholera toxin.

The most common mutations that cause cystic fibrosis and pancreatic insufficiency in humans are:

Variant cDNA name (ordered 5' to 3')	Variant protein name	Variant legacy name	rsID	# alleles in CFTR2	Allele frequency in CFTR2	% pancreatic insufficient	Variant final determination (July 2020)
c.1521_1523delCTT	p.Phe508del	F508del	rs113993960	99061	0.69744	98%	CF-causing
c.1624G>T	p.Gly542X	G542X	rs113993959	3610	0.02542	98%	CF-causing
c.1652G>A	p.Gly551Asp	G551D	rs75527207	2986	0.02102	96%	CF-causing
c.3909C>G	p.Asn1303Lys	N1303K	rs80034486	2246	0.01581	98%	CF-causing
c.350G>A	p.Arg117His	R117H	rs78655421	1854	0.01305	23%	Varying clinical consequence
c.3846G>A	p.Trp1282X	W1282X	rs77010898	1726	0.01215	99%	CF-causing
c.489+1G>T	No protein name	621+1G->T	rs78756941	1323	0.00931	99%	CF-causing
c.1657C>T	p.Arg553X	R553X	rs74597325	1323	0.00931	97%	CF-causing
c.1585-1G>A	No protein name	1717-1G->A	rs76713772	1216	0.00856	97%	CF-causing
c.3718-2477C>T	No protein name	3849+10kbC->T	rs75039782	1158	0.00815	33%	CF-causing
c.2657+5G>A	No protein name	2789+5G->A	rs80224560	1027	0.00723	43%	CF-causing
c.1519_1521delATC	p. Ile507del	I507del	rs121908745	651	0.00458	98%	CF-causing
c.3484C>T	p.Arg1162X	R1162X	rs74767530	651	0.00458	97%	CF-causing
c.254G>A	p.Gly85Glu	G85E	rs75961395	616	0.00434	85%	CF-causing
c.3454G>C	p.Asp1152His	D1152H	rs75541969	571	0.00402	24%	Varying clinical consequence
c.2051_2052delAAinsG	p. Lys684SerfsX38	2183AA->G	rs121908799	542	0.00382	96%	CF-causing
c.3528delC	p. Lys1177SerfsX15	3659delC	rs121908747	539	0.00379	99%	CF-causing
c.1040G>C	p.Arg347Pro	R347P	rs77932196	533	0.00375	68%	CF-causing
c.1210−12T[5]	No protein name	5T	rs1805177	516	0.00363	28%	Varying clinical consequence
c.2988+1G>A	No protein name	3120+1G->A	rs75096551	501	0.00353	98%	CF-causing
c.1364C>A	p.Ala455Glu	A455E	rs74551128	500	0.00352	34%	CF-causing
c.3140-26A>G	No protein name	3272-26A->G	rs76151804	470	0.00331	29%	CF-causing
c.1000C>T	p.Arg334Trp	R334W	rs121909011	429	0.00302	40%	CF-causing
c.1766+1G>A	No protein name	1898+1G->A	rs121908748	421	0.00296	99%	CF-causing
c.54-5940_273+10250del21kb	p.Ser18ArgfsX16	CFTRdele2,3	not found	417	0.00294	100%	CF-causing
c.1679G>C	p.Arg560Thr	R560T	rs80055610	343	0.00241	98%	CF-causing
c.617T>G	p. Leu206Trp	L206W	rs121908752	333	0.00234	20%	CF-causing
c.2052dupA	p.Gln685ThrfsX4	2184insA	rs121908786	329	0.00232	85%	CF-causing
c.262_263delTT	p. Leu88IlefsX22	394delTT	rs121908769	307	0.00216	97%	CF-causing
c.178G>T	p.Glu60X	E60X	rs77284892	296	0.00208	99%	CF-causing
c.1477C>T	p.Gln493X	Q493X	rs77101217	292	0.00206	98%	CF-causing
c.579+1G>T	No protein name	711+1G->T	rs77188391	274	0.00193	98%	CF-causing
c.2052delA	p. Lys684AsnfsX38	2184delA	rs121908746	255	0.00180	98%	CF-causing
c.200C>T	p.Pro67Leu	P67L	rs368505753	239	0.00168	34%	CF-causing
c.3302T>A	p.Met1101Lys	M1101K	rs36210737	238	0.00168	69%	CF-causing
c.1408A>G	p.Met470Val	M470V	rs213950	235	0.00165	46%	Non CF-causing
c.3276C>A or c.3276C>G	p.Tyr1092X	Y1092X	rs121908761	225	0.00158	98%	CF-causing
c.3196C>T	p.Arg1066Cys	R1066C	rs78194216	220	0.00155	98%	CF-causing
c.1021_1022dupTC	p.Phe342HisfsX28	1154insTC	rs387906360	214	0.00151	99%	CF-causing
c.3773dupT	p. Leu1258PhefsX7	3905insT	rs121908789	210	0.00148	97%	CF-causing
c.1646G>A	p.Ser549Asn	S549N	rs121908755	203	0.00143	84%	CF-causing
c.1040G>A	p.Arg347His	R347H	rs77932196	199	0.00140	24%	CF-causing
c.948delT	p.Phe316LeufsX12	1078delT	rs121908744	184	0.00130	99%	CF-causing
c.1210-33_1210-6GT[12]T[4]	No protein name	5T;TG12	not found	182	0.00128	14%	Varying clinical consequence
c.3472C>T	p.Arg1158X	R1158X	rs79850223	179	0.00126	99%	CF-causing
c.2834C>T	p.Ser945Leu	S945L	rs397508442	167	0.00118	40%	CF-causing
c.1558G>T	p. Val520Phe	V520F	rs77646904	156	0.00110	98%	CF-causing
c.443T>C	p. Ile148Thr	I148T	rs35516286	148	0.00104	88%	Non CF-causing
c.349C>T	p.Arg117Cys	R117C	rs77834169	146	0.00103	24%	CF-causing

=== DeltaF508 ===
DeltaF508 (ΔF508), full name CFTRΔF508 or F508del-CFTR (rs113993960), is a specific mutation within the CFTR gene involving deletion of three nucleotides spanning codons for amino acid positions 507 and 508 of the CFTR gene on chromosome 7, which ultimately results in the loss of a single codon for the amino acid phenylalanine (F). A person with the CFTRΔF508 mutation will produce an abnormal CFTR protein that lacks this phenylalanine residue and which cannot fold properly. Most of this mutated protein does not escape the endoplasmic reticulum for further processing. The small amounts that reach the plasma membrane are destabilized and the anion channel opens infrequently. Having two copies of this mutation (one inherited from each parent) is by far the most common cause of cystic fibrosis (CF), responsible for nearly two-thirds of mutations worldwide.

==== Effects ====
The CFTR protein is largely expressed in cells of the pancreas, intestinal and respiratory epithelia, and all exocrine glands. When properly folded, it is shuttled to the cell membrane, where it becomes a transmembrane protein that forms aqueous channels allowing the flow of chloride and bicarbonate ions out of cells; it also simultaneously inhibits the uptake of sodium ions by another channel protein. Both of these functions help to maintain an ion gradient that causes osmosis to draw water out of the cells. The ΔF508 mutation leads to the misfolding of CFTR and its eventual degradation in the ER. In organisms with two complements of the mutation, the protein is almost entirely absent from the cell membrane, and these critical ion transport functions are not performed.

Having a homozygous pair of genes with the ΔF508 mutation prevents the CFTR protein from assuming its normal position in the cell membrane. This causes increased water retention in cells, corresponding dehydration of the extracellular space, and an associated cascade of effects on various parts of the body. These effects include: thicker mucous membranes in the epithelia of afflicted organs; obstruction of narrow respiratory airways as a result of thicker mucus and inhibition of the free movement of muco cilia; congenital absence of the vas deferens due to increased mucus thickness during fetal development; pancreatic insufficiency due to blockage of the pancreatic duct with mucus; and increased risk of respiratory infection due to build-up of thick, nutrient-rich mucus where bacteria thrive. Mucus thickening is also hypothesized to disrupt innate immune-system mechanisms due to changes in immune-cell and molecular profiles (including decreased alveolar macrophage activity and increased cytokine and neutrophil presence). This results in an aggravated systemic inflammatory response and impaired phagocytosis, reducing the body's ability to fight infection. These are the symptoms of cystic fibrosis, a genetic disorder; however, ΔF508 is not the only mutation that causes this disorder.

Being a heterozygous carrier (having a single copy of ΔF508) results in decreased water loss during diarrhea because malfunctioning or absent CFTR proteins cannot maintain stable ion gradients across cell membranes. Typical nucleotide-binding-up of both Cl^{−} and Na^{+} ions inside affected cells, creating a hypotonic solution outside the cells and causing water to diffuse into the cells by osmosis. Several studies indicate that heterozygous carriers are at increased risk for various symptoms. For example, it has been shown that heterozygosity for cystic fibrosis is associated with increased airway reactivity, and heterozygotes may be at risk for poor pulmonary function. Heterozygotes with wheeze have been shown to be at higher risk for poor pulmonary function or development and progression of chronic obstructive lung disease. One gene for cystic fibrosis is sufficient to produce mild lung abnormalities even in the absence of infection.

==== Mechanism ====
The CFTR gene is located on the long arm of chromosome 7, at position q31.2, and ultimately codes for a sequence of 1,480 amino acids. Normally, the three DNA base pairs A-T-C (paired with T-A-G on the opposite strand) at the gene's 507th position form the template for the mRNA codon A-U-C for isoleucine, while the three DNA base pairs T-T-T (paired with A-A-A) at the adjacent 508th position form the template for the codon U-U-U for phenylalanine. The ΔF508 mutation is a deletion of the C-G pair from position 507 along with the first two T-A pairs from position 508, leaving the DNA sequence A-T-T (paired with T-A-A) at position 507, which is transcribed into the mRNA codon A-U-U. Since A-U-U also codes for isoleucine, position 507's amino acid does not change, and the mutation's net effect is equivalent to a deletion ("Δ") of the sequence resulting in the codon for phenylalanine at position 508.

==== Prevalence ====
ΔF508 is present on at least one copy of chromosome 7 in approximately one in 30 Caucasians. Presence of the mutation on both copies causes the autosomal recessive disease cystic fibrosis. Scientists have estimated that the original mutation occurred over 52,000 years ago in Northern Europe though cystic fibrosis patients of other ethnicities are also known to harbor the mutation. The young allele age may be a consequence of past selection. One hypothesis as to why the otherwise detrimental mutation has been maintained by natural selection is that a single copy may present a positive effect by reducing water loss during cholera, though the introduction of pathogenic Vibrio cholerae into Europe did not occur until the late 18th century. Another theory posits that CF carriers (heterozygotes for ΔF508) are more resistant to typhoid fever, since CFTR has been shown to act as a receptor for Salmonella typhi bacteria to enter intestinal epithelial cells.

Cystic fibrosis ΔF508 heterozygotes may be overrepresented among individuals with asthma and may have poorer lung function than non-carriers. Carriers of a single CF mutation have a higher prevalence of chronic rhinosinusitis than the general population. Approximately 50% of cystic fibrosis cases in Europe are due to homozygous ΔF508 mutations (this varies widely by region), while the allele frequency of ΔF508 is about 70%. The remaining cases are caused by over 1,500 other mutations, including R117H, 1717-1G>A, and 2789+56G>A. These mutations, when combined with each other or even a single copy of ΔF508, may cause CF symptoms. The genotype is not strongly correlated with severity of the CF, though specific symptoms have been linked to certain mutations.

== Structure ==
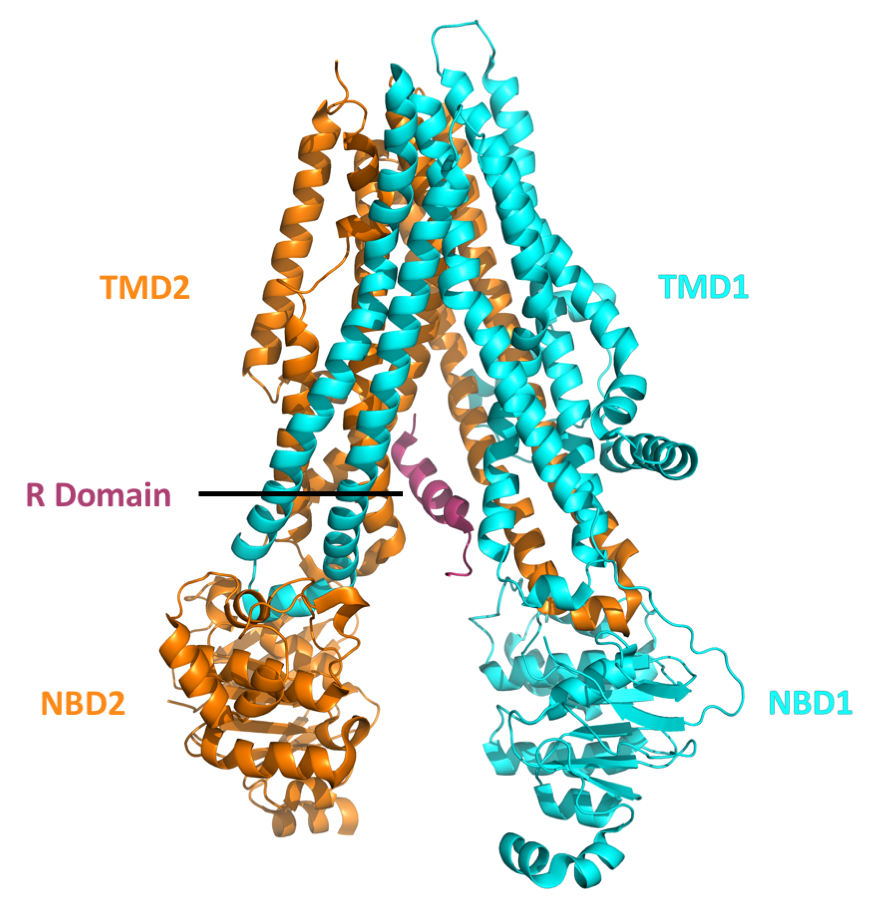
The Overall Structure of Human CFTR in the Dephosphorylated, ATP-Free Conformation. Domains are labeled. Made from PDB 5UAK.

The CFTR gene is approximately 189 kb in length, with 27 exons and 26 introns. CFTR is a glycoprotein and is found on the surface of many epithelial cells in the body. CFTR consists of five domains, which include two transmembrane or membrane-spanning domains, two nucleotide-binding domains and a regulatory domain. The transmembrane domains are each connected to a nucleotide binding domain (NBD) in the cytoplasm. The first NBD is connected to the second transmembrane domain by a regulatory "R" domain that is a unique feature of CFTR, not present in other ABC transporters which carries 19 predicted sites for protein kinase A(PKA). Six of these have been reported to be phosphorylated in vivo. The ion channel only opens when its R-domain has been phosphorylated by PKA and ATP is bound at the NBDs. Phosphorylation displaces the disordered R domain from positions preventing NBD dimerization and opening. The amino-terminus is part of the lasso motif which anchors into the cell membrane. The carboxyl terminal of the protein is anchored to the cytoskeleton by a PDZ-interacting domain.

== Location and function ==
The CFTR protein is a channel protein that controls the flow of H_{2}O and Cl^{−} ions in and out of cells inside the lungs. When the CFTR protein is working correctly, as shown in Panel 1, ions freely flow in and out of the cells. However, when the CFTR protein is malfunctioning as in Panel 2, these ions cannot flow out of the cell due to blocked CFTR channels. This occurs in cystic fibrosis, characterized by the buildup of thick mucus in the lungs.

The CFTR gene is made up of 27 exons that encode its gene makeup and is found on the long (q) arm of chromosome 7 at locus 31.2. Exons are DNA fragments that provide the code for a protein structure. CFTR functions as phosphorylation and ATP-gated anion channel, increasing the conductance for certain anions (e.g. Cl^{−}) to flow down their electrochemical gradient. ATP-driven conformational changes in CFTR open and close a gate to allow the transmembrane flow of anions down their electrochemical gradient. This in contrast to other ABC proteins, in which ATP-driven conformational changes fuel uphill substrate transport across cellular membranes. Essentially, CFTR is an ion channel that evolved as a 'broken' ABC transporter that leaks when in the open conformation.

CFTRs consist of five domains including two trans-membrane domains, each linked to a nucleotide-binding domain. CFTR also contains another domain called the regulatory domain. Other members of the ABC transporter superfamily are involved in the uptake of nutrients in prokaryotes, or in the export of a variety of substrates in eukaryotes. ABC transporters have evolved to transduce the free energy of ATP hydrolysis to the uphill movement of substrates across the cell membrane. They have two main conformations, one where the cargo binding site is facing the cytosol or inward facing (ATP free), and one where it is outward facing (ATP bound). ATP binds to each nucleotide-binding domain, which results in the subsequent NBD dimerization, leading to the rearrangement of the transmembrane helices. This changes the accessibility of the cargo binding site from an inward-facing position to an outward facing one. ATP binding, and the hydrolysis that follows, drives the alternative exposure of the cargo binding site, ensuring a unidirectional transport of cargo against an electrochemical gradient. In CFTR, alternating between an inward-facing conformation to an outward-facing one results in channel gating. In particular, NBD dimerization (favored by ATP binding) is coupled to transition to an outward-facing conformation in which an open transmembrane pathway for anions is formed. Subsequent hydrolysis (at the canonical active site, site 2, including Walker motifs of NBD2) destabilizes the NBD dimer and favors return to the inward-facing conformation, in which the anion permeation pathway is closed off.

== Clinical implications ==
Different CFTR loss-of-function mutations can lead to varying degrees of cystic fibrosis severity. Common symptoms include chronic lung infections, pancreatic insufficiency, and high sweat chloride levels. Mutation-specific therapies, such as CFTR modulators, have been developed to address these specific genetic defects.

=== Drug target (modulators) ===
CFTR has been a drug target in efforts to find treatments for related conditions. Ivacaftor (brand name Kalydeco, developed as VX-770) is a medication approved by the FDA in 2012, for people with cystic fibrosis who have specific CFTR mutations. Ivacaftor was developed by Vertex Pharmaceuticals in conjunction with the Cystic Fibrosis Foundation and is the first medication that treats the underlying cause rather than the symptoms of the disease. and "a wonder drug".

The combination vanzacaftor/tezacaftor/deutivacaftor (brand name Alyftrek) was approved for medical use in the United States in December 2024.

=== Inhibitors ===
It is inhibited by the anti-diarrhoea drug crofelemer.

== Protein-protein interactions ==
Cystic fibrosis transmembrane conductance regulator has been shown to interact with:

- DNAJC5,
- GOPC,
- PDZK1,
- PRKCE,
- SLC4A8,
- SNAP23,
- SLC9A3R1,
- SLC9A3R2, and
- STX1A,

== Related conditions ==
- Congenital bilateral absence of vas deferens: Males with congenital bilateral absence of the vas deferens most often have a mild mutation (a change that allows partial function of the gene) in one copy of the CFTR gene and a cystic fibrosis-causing mutation in the other copy of CFTR.
- Cystic fibrosis: More than 1,800 mutations in the CFTR gene have been found but the majority of these have not been associated with cystic fibrosis. Most of these mutations either substitute one amino acid (a building block of proteins) for another amino acid in the CFTR protein or delete a small amount of DNA in the CFTR gene. The most common mutation, called ΔF508, is a deletion (Δ) of one amino acid (phenylalanine) at position 508 in the CFTR protein. This altered protein never reaches the cell membrane because it is degraded shortly after it is made. All disease-causing mutations in the CFTR gene prevent the channel from functioning properly, leading to a blockage of the movement of salt and water into and out of cells. As a result of this blockage, cells that line the passageways of the lungs, pancreas, and other organs produce abnormally thick, sticky mucus. This mucus obstructs the airways and glands, causing the characteristic signs and symptoms of cystic fibrosis. In addition, only thin mucus can be removed by cilia; thick mucus cannot, so it traps bacteria that give rise to chronic infections.
- Cholera: ADP-ribosylation caused by cholera toxin results in increased production of cyclic AMP which in turn opens the CFTR channel which leads to oversecretion of Cl^{−}. Na^{+} and H_{2}O follow Cl^{−} into the small intestine, resulting in dehydration and loss of electrolytes.
