= List of people diagnosed with cystic fibrosis =

The following notable people have or had cystic fibrosis.

Name	Life	Notability	Reference
Frankie Abernathy	(1981–2007)	Former cast member of MTVs The Real World: San Diego; appeared in 22 of the 25 episodes.	
Bill Balas	(1974—2025)	American screenwriter, director and producer best known for his work on the A&E series Bates Motel and the TNT series Animal Kingdom.	
Dean Barnett	(1967–2008)	American conservative columnist and blogger.	
Lisa Bentley	(1968—)	Canadian Ironman triathlete.	
Carré Callaway	(1986—)	American singer-songwriter, of Queen Kwong	
Nathan Charles	(1989—)	Professional rugby union player with the Western Force. As of 2014, believed to be the only CF patient to play any contact sport professionally.	
Frédéric Chopin? (unconfirmed)	(1810–1849)	Polish composer. During his lifetime and at his death, he was thought to suffer from tuberculosis. However, recently scientists have suggested that his symptoms were more consistent with cystic fibrosis, unknown at the time. The Polish government has refused to allow DNA tests to be performed on his heart, which is preserved in alcohol (see Frédéric Chopin's illness).	
Harry Coffey	(1995—)	Australian professional horse racing jockey. Rider of the winner of three Group One Winners including 2024 Caulfield Cup.	
Christopher Davies	(1978—)	Former Southern Redbacks cricketer and current Port Adelaide Football Club Football general manager.	
AniKa Dąbrowska	(2005–)	Polish pop singer, winner of the second series of the Polish talent show The Voice Kids	
Alexandra Deford	(1971–1980)	Daughter of American sportswriter Frank Deford, subject of Deford's book Alex: The Life Of A Child.	
Gunnar Esiason	(1991—)	Son of former football player Boomer Esiason.	
Bob Flanagan	(1952–1996)	American writer, poet, performance artist, and comic.	
Isabelle Jane Foulkes	(1970–2001)	Anglo-Welsh artist, textile designer and disability campaigner; designed the Welsh fingerspelling alphabet	
Travis Flores	(1991–2024)	American activist, philanthropist, motivational speaker, actor and award-winning children's book author.	
Nolan Gottlieb	(1982—)	Former Anderson University (South Carolina) NCAA basketball player and current Anderson assistant coach.	
Queva Griffin	(1983–2003)	Published a book of poetry as a fundraiser. Named Ireland's Young Person of The Year in 1998.	
Kenneth Keith Kallenbach	(1970–2008)	Frequent guest on the Howard Stern Show.	
Grégory Lemarchal	(1983–2007)	French singer and winner of the show Star Academy, Season 4.	
Katie Malik	(1979—)	American singer and runner up on Swedish reality TV series Allt för Sverige, season 4 (2014). Believed to be the first person with CF to work professionally as an operatic singer.	
Eva Markvoort	(1984–2010)	Canadian blogger and subject of 65 Redroses.	
Alice Martineau	(1972–2003)	British singer-songwriter and model.	
Sarah Murnaghan	(2003–)	10-year-old girl who was initially denied access to adult lungs when no pediatric lungs were available. Federal Judge Michael Baylson issued a temporary restraining order keeping Kathleen Sebelius from enforcing the 'patient-must-be-12-or-older' rule.	
Christine Nelson	(1960–1982)	Actress; Daughter of Muppet puppeter Jerry Nelson who appeared alongside her father in a cameo appearance in The Great Muppet Caper.	
Bianca Nicholas	(1989–)	British pop and swing singer, one half of Electro Velvet	
Paul Quinton	(1944–)	American physiologist.	
Laura Rothenberg	(1981–2003)	Brown University student, and author of Breathing for a Living: A Memoir, and My So Called Lungs a radio documentary, which aired on NPR August 5, 2002.	
Andrew Simmons	(1984—)	British professional wrestler.	
Alex Stobbs	(1990—)	British music student, subject of the documentary A Boy Called Alex	
Orla Tinsley	(1987—)	Irish CF and LGBT activist, author, journalist and student	
Bill Williams	(1960–1998)	Software developer	
Anton Yelchin	(1989–2016)	American actor, best known for his role as Pavel Chekov in the Star Trek reboot.	
