= Cystic fibrosis and race =

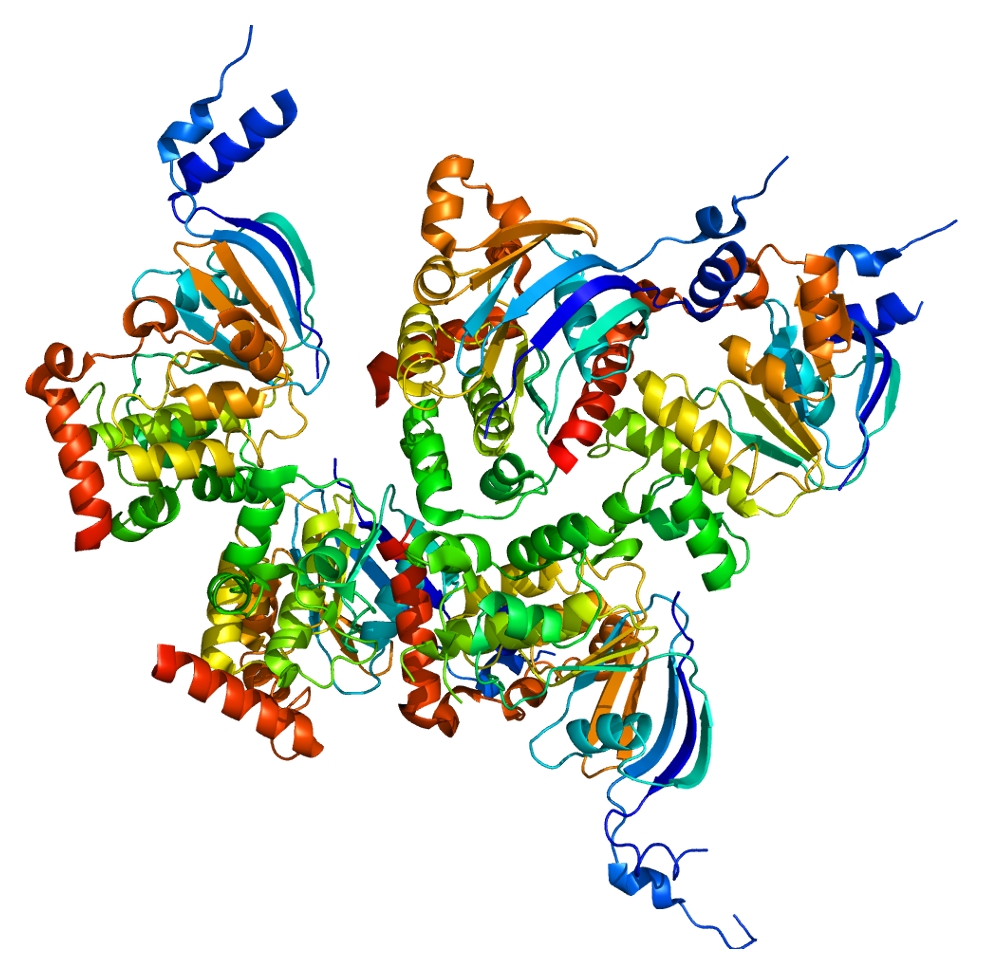
Cystic fibrosis transmembrane conductance regulatory (CFTR) protein

Underrepresented populations, especially Black and Hispanic populations with cystic fibrosis, are often not successfully diagnosed. This is in part due to the minimal dissemination of existing data on patients from these underrepresented groups. While white populations do appear to experience a higher frequency of cystic fibrosis, other ethnicities are also affected and not always by the same biological mechanisms. Thus, many healthcare and treatment options are less reliable or unavailable to underrepresented populations. This issue affects the level at which public health needs are being met across the world.

== Definition ==
Cystic fibrosis (CF) is an autosomal recessive and monogenetic disorder. It is caused by mutations in the cystic fibrosis transmembrane conductance regulator (CFTR) gene. The CFTR protein (Figure 1) serves to move chloride ions to the surface of cells to ensure proper hydration. When this protein becomes dysfunctional, the chloride ions are not present to thin out the viscous mucus that forms. This thickened mucus causes many problems in various organs of the body.

== Symptoms ==
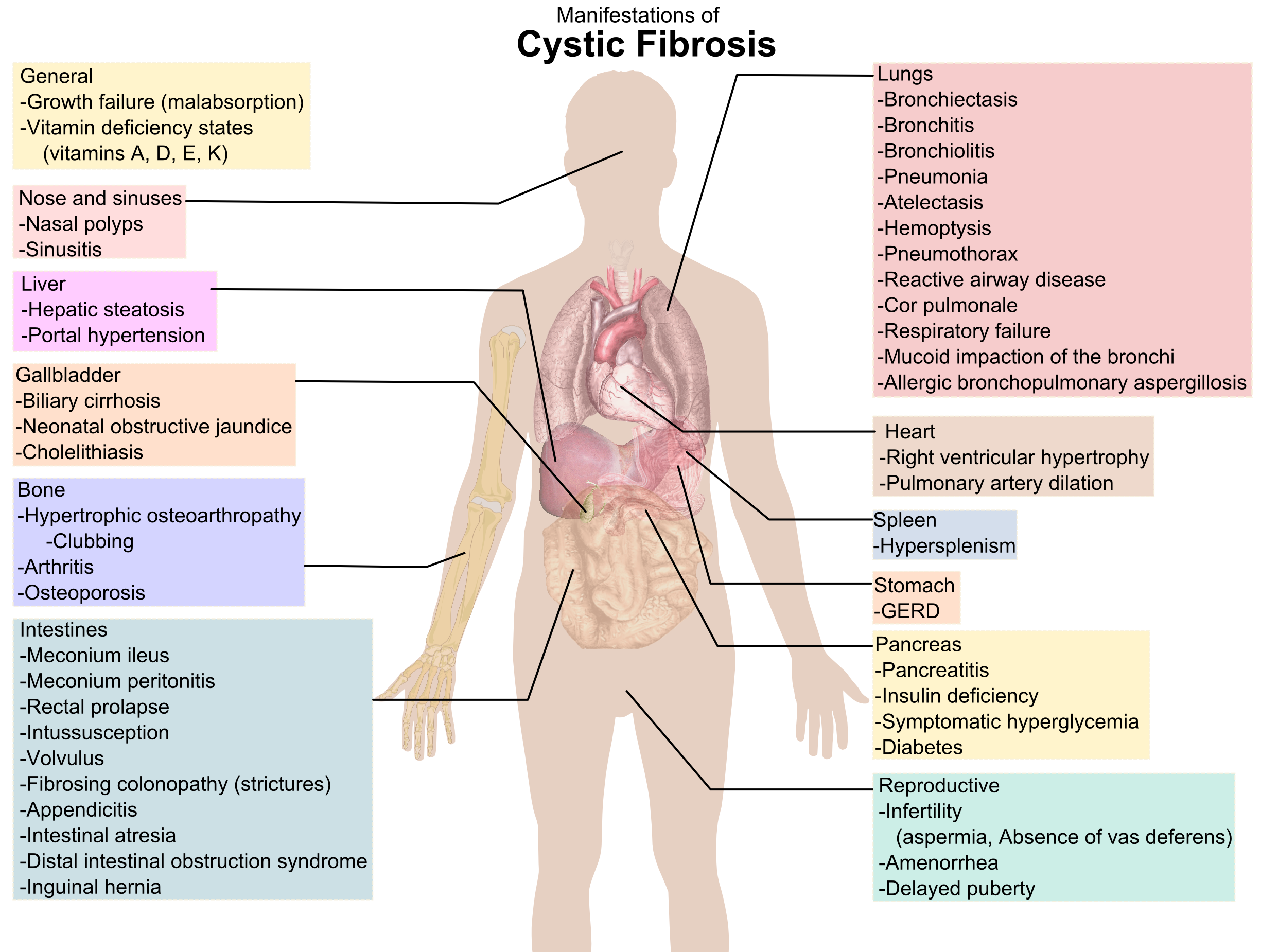
Symptoms of CF

People with cystic fibrosis may experience salty skin, persistent coughing, lung infections such as pneumonia and bronchitis, and wheezing and shortness of breath. Cystic fibrosis can also cause poor weight gain and growth, nasal polyps, chronic sinus infections, clubbing or enlargement of fingers and toes, infertility in males, and rectal prolapse. Cystic fibrosis may also lead to arthropathies. These symptoms and co-morbidities can ultimately lead to nutritional deficits and highly decreased quality of life.

Compared to white patients, Black patients have more severe pulmonary imaging findings and display more respiratory symptoms at diagnosis. Similarly, Black and Hispanic patients have overall worse pulmonary function than white patients that is often present earlier in life. Though this may be the case, these symptoms can be misdiagnosed as other health issues and treated as such.

== Diagnosis ==
=== Through symptoms ===
To be diagnosed with CF, patients must meet certain criteria. These criteria may include showing a combination of the signs and symptoms above and/or have a family member with CF and/or test positive for the mutation during genetic screening.

==== Conventional diagnostic criteria ====
Individuals must have at least one clinical feature:

- meconium ileus (bowel obstruction when meconium in intestine is too thick)
- diarrhea and failure to thrive
- recurrent respiratory infections
- nasal polyps
- rectal prolapse
- male infertility
- electrolyte depletion

Or CF diagnosis in family member, or positive newborn screening test, plus one or both of the following:

- chloride channel dysfunction (positive sweat test or abnormal transepithelial potential difference)
- known disease-causing mutations on chromosome 7 in trans

Though these symptoms may present themselves in underrepresented minorities, there remains the misconception among doctors that underrepresented minorities rarely have the disease. This results in under-diagnosis in these populations. Also, in developing countries, such as in Africa, where HIV, protein energy malnutrition, and chronic pulmonary infections are prominent, it can be difficult for clinicians to rightly diagnose patients with CF. Proper diagnosis can also be affected when patients show a positive test but do not display symptoms or display symptoms but do not show positive diagnostic tests. For this reason, it is very important to continue to monitor patients in both categories, especially those of the latter while treating the symptoms that may be disguised as another disease.

=== Through screening ===
In many western countries, prenatal and newborn genetic screening is available. This has been correlated with decreased incidence as patients and their families are able to seek treatment early on. These screening methods may include measuring serum immunoreactive trypsin (iRT) and CFTR mutation analysis.

CFTR mutation classification systems typically include six classes where classes I-III tend to have more severe symptoms than classes IV-VI.

==== CFTR mutation classification ====
1. Protein production mutations (Class I)
2. Protein processing mutations (Class II)
3. Gating mutations (Class III)
4. Conduction mutations (Class IV)
5. Insufficient CFTR transcript mutations (Class V)
6. Reduced protein stability and increased turnover of CFTR at the cell surface (Class VI)

IRT and CFTR mutation analyses are always confirmed with what is known as a sweat test which will show elevated levels of chloride in sweat of CF patients. However, this is not a perfect system and many children end up with an inconclusive diagnosis and need to be monitored for symptoms that may not show up until much later in life. Also, in some states such as New Jersey, there is only one mutation on the CFTR screening panel (F508del). Because 12.9% of CF patients in the United States do not have this specific mutation, they cannot be diagnosed using this particular screening method. This value can be even larger when narrowing in on minority populations (see race and ethnicity). Upon analysis of the 2020 Cystic Fibrosis Foundation Patient Registry, the detection rate of CFTR mutation variants in known CF patients was highest in white patients at a false negative rate of only 3–5%.

CFTR Mutation Detection Rate 2020 Cystic Fibrosis Foundation Patient Registry
Race / ethnicity	Detection rate (%)	Detection failure rate (%)
Asian	56-77	23-44
Black	73-86	14-27
American Indian and Alaskan Natives	84-91	9-16
Hispanic	81-94	6-19
White	95-97	3-5

== Risk factors, incidence, and prevalence ==
=== Genetics, sex, and age ===
Since the CFTR mutation is autosomal recessive, the most significant risk factor is family history. The disease only manifests itself when a child inherits CFTR mutations from both parents. Children who inherit a mutation from one parent are considered carriers and can pass it on to their children. With this being the case, mutations may be family and region specific (See Race, ethnicity, and geographic location). In regard to sex, CF occurs in males and females; however, women are more likely to display worse symptoms and outcomes. This is particularly relevant in regard to Peudomonas aeruginosa respiratory infections. Age-wise, most people are diagnosed by the age of 2; however, the Cystic Fibrosis Foundation Patient Registry shows that more than half of the CF population is age 18 or older in the United States.

=== Race, ethnicity, and geographic location ===
Cystic fibrosis occurs in all races, but may be most prevalent in white people of Northern European ancestry. CF incidence in other populations may be underreported as there are hundreds of CFTR mutations that can manifest the disease and not all have been identified. Though there has been a decrease in incidence in more developed countries due to prenatal genetic screening, the prevalence is expected to increase as people are able to live longer with the disease.

F508del is the most common mutation across all cystic fibrosis patients. However, it is not the most common mutation found in specific geographical locations.

CFTR mutation F508del frequency by geographical location
Frequency (%)	Location
70	central, northern, western, and northeastern Europe
100	Faroe Islands of Denmark
20	Turkey
60	Argentina and Uruguay
40	Brazil, Chile, Colombia, Mexico, and Venezuela
20-30	Puerto Rico, Cuba, Ecuador, and Costa Rica
10	Dominican Republic
60	Pakistan
20	India
10	Japan

Since a popular method of identification is genetic testing for this particular mutation, the identification frequency is lower in underrepresented population.

CFTR mutation identification frequency by race in the United States
Identification category	Frequency (%)	Race
Unclassified	25	Black, Hispanic, and other races
	11	non-Hispanic White
One unidentified	8-10	Black, Hispanic, and other races
	3	non-Hispanic White people

African descendants display the most genetic diversity across the human population. For CF patients of African descent, this means that they are more likely to harbor less common CFTR mutations. Some mutations that are unique to Africa are 2766del8, 1670delC, Y1109x, and A204T.

Map of mutations identified in African countries

CFTR mutations on the African continent. Mutations in bold text are unique to Africa.
Country	Mutations
Morocco	ΔF508, 5T, 12TG, 11TG, 711+1G>T, R74W, R1070W, D1270N, 3849+10kbC>T, S549R, G1244E, U
Algeria	ΔF508, 1609delCA, N1303K, 711+1G>T, 1812-1G>A, 5T, E1104X, U
Tunisia	ΔF508, W1282X, 711+1G>T, E1104X, R74W, Y122X, V201M, R1158X, 4016insT, U, G542X, N1303K, 405+1G>A, G85E, D1270N, R1066C, I1203V, R785X, 5T, **2766del8, F1166C, 3729delAinsTCT, 1811+5A>G, T665S, L1043R, 4268+2T>G**
Libya	**1670delC**, ΔF508, E1104X, N1303K, U
Egypt	ΔF508, N1303K, U, 1838+3A>C, T665S, 5T, **7T, 9T**
Sudan	D579G, **R1102K**
Senegal	U, **4136+1G>A, EX17a-EX18del**
Cameroon	**Y1109x, 405+4A>G**
Rwanda	F693L, T854T, M470V, P1290P, E527E, U, 3120+1G>A, Q1463Q, 1898+152T>A, 1001+11C>T, 2752-15C>G, **A204T, 3041-71A>G, 4575+2G>A, 3272-32T>C**
Namibia	ΔF508
Zimbabwe	3120+1G>A, **c.54-1161_c.164+1603del2875**
South Africa	ΔF508, G1249E, D1270N, 394deITT, R553X, N1303K, R117H, S549N, 1717-1G>A, 3659deIC, 2183delAA, 3120+1G>A, 3196de154, 3272-26A>G, G542X, W1282X, G5510, 0493X, 621+1G>T, 278945G>A, R1162X, U, **-94G>T, c.54-1161_c.164+1603del2875**

== Treatment ==
Treatment is most effective with early diagnosis. As CF is a complicated ailment, patients must often use a combination of therapies.

=== Airway clearance ===
Clearing the airways of mucus can help decrease the incidence of infection in the lung and improve lung function. The most common airway clearance techniques include deep coughing, active breathing therapy, autogenic drainage, and positive expiratory pressure.

=== Inhaled medications ===
There are several available inhaled medications such as bronchodilators and mucus thinners. These are medications that are delivered as a mist or aerosol and inhaled through a nebulizer. They may also include antibiotics.

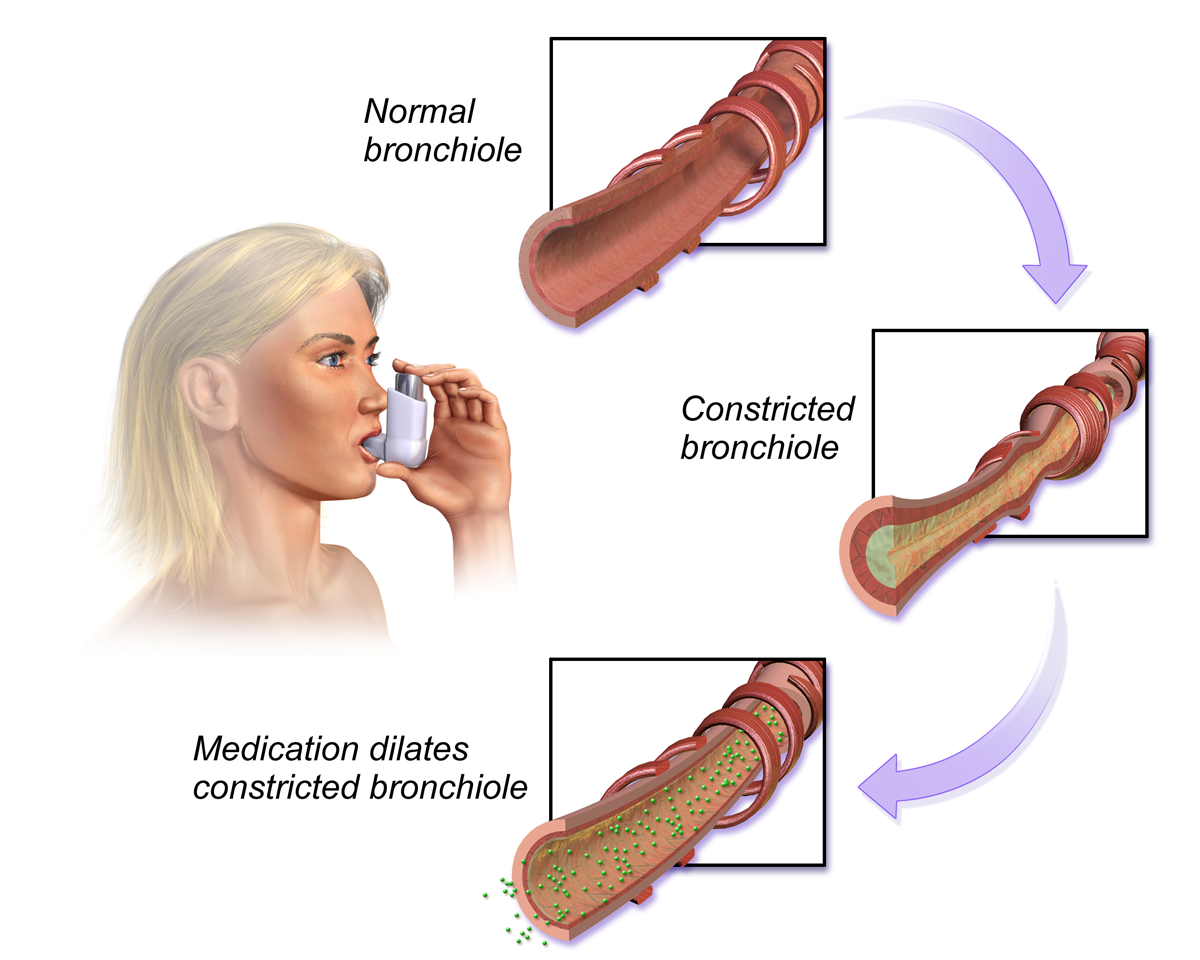
Figure 3. Bronchodilators are a type of inhaled medication used to treat symptoms of CF.

=== Antibiotics ===
Antibiotics are used to fight bacterial infections which CF patients are very likely to develop due to thickened mucus. They are often taken daily by CF patients. It is recommended that inhaled antibiotics be taken only when the airway has been clear so that the drug can reach the affected area easily.

=== Pancreatic enzyme supplements ===
Pancreatic enzyme supplements serve to improve pancreatic function by increasing the absorption of essential nutrients. They are taken with meals. Multivitamins as supplements are also recommended for CF patients.

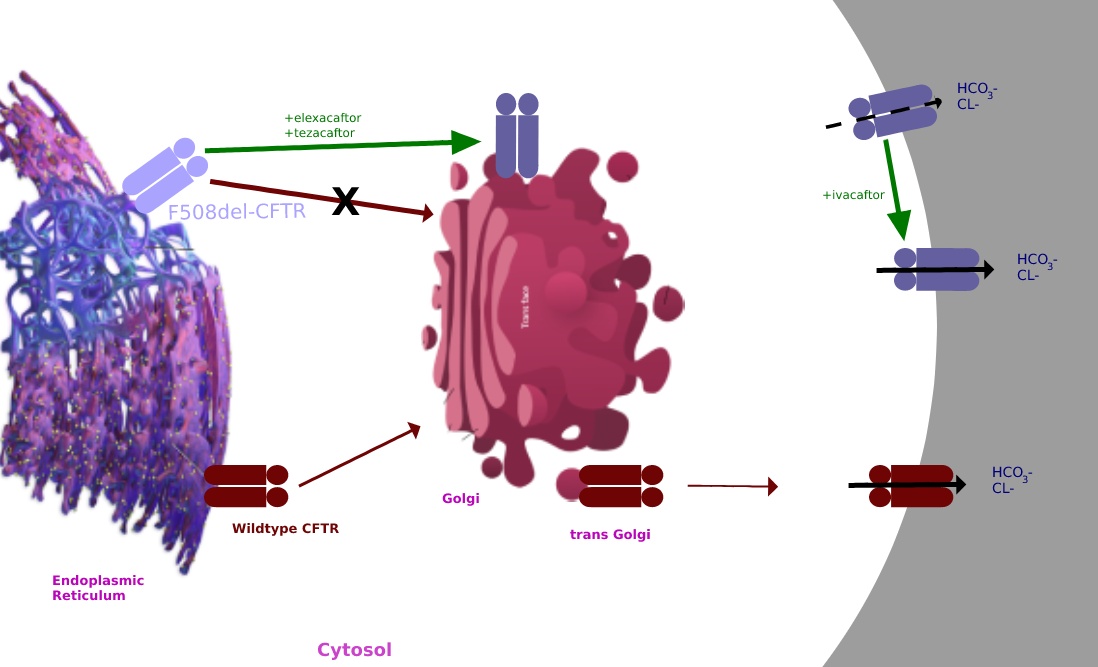
Mechanism of action of Elexacaftor/tezacaftor/ivacaftor

=== Fitness plans ===
A personalized fitness plan can aid in airway clearance, improve energy, increase lung function, and help the overall health of the patient.

=== CFTR modulators ===
CFTR modulators target the mutated CFTR protein. Thus far, there are some approved CFTR modulators for specific mutations. One such drug is elexacaftor/tezacaftor/ivacaftor. However, the cost of CFTR modulators is high. In addition to the high cost, the available CFTR modulators may not be as effective in minority populations. In fact, while 92.4% of white patients are eligible for treatment with CFTR modulators, only 69.7% and 75.6% of Hispanic patients are eligible.

== Global impact ==
=== Healthcare access ===
Communities with large Black and Hispanic populations are also most likely to have lower quality/less available healthcare. This means that the risk of mistakes being made in screening and diagnosis are more likely to happen in these areas. The clinics and hospitals are often understaffed and rushing through samples can cause inaccurate screening results. Furthermore, the cystic fibrosis screening tests for CFTR present false negative results most often in Black and Hispanic babies. This happens because the CFTR variants most tested for are those that are largely found in white populations. Also, as previously mentioned, one of the most common methods of diagnosis is using the sweat test. However, this test has a disproportionate rate of false negatives in areas with less healthcare access. The presence of implicit biases in healthcare also contribute to this. Additionally, availability of genetic screening options in developing countries and areas of lower socioeconomic status has proven to be difficult both because of financial and resource burden. Altogether, this means that Black and Hispanic families are more likely to be diagnosed later on and therefore do not receive timely and as effective treatment.

=== Prognosis and quality of life in underrepresented populations ===
It is still up for debate on whether the overall prognosis of CF is improving. In areas where genetic screening is available, clinicians are able to identify and provide treatment for CF early on. In areas where this is not available, many patients are not diagnosed until later in life and display worse symptoms and poorer management of symptoms. This is often in areas where there is a high density of underrepresented groups. With the reduced access to healthcare, minority populations experience worse outcomes, even after taking low socioeconomic status into account. Although Hispanic patients are more likely than white patients to have milder CFTR mutations (those from Classes IV-VI), they suffer worse outcomes.

CFTR class I-III mutation frequency by race in the United States
Frequency (%)	Race
75	non-Hispanic White
50	Black, Hispanic, and other races

== Current programs and research ==
In addition to focusing on improving detection and diagnosis, understanding CF microorganisms, and developing new treatments, optimizing current treatments, and evaluating long-term antimicrobial use, the Cystic Fibrosis Foundation is currently striving for more equity and timeliness in cystic fibrosis newborn screening. Cystic Fibrosis Research Institute has implemented strategies to increase awareness in underrepresented populations. Though there is ongoing research about cystic fibrosis in underrepresented populations, many of the studies leave much to be desired and are not performed to the standards of studies conducted in white patients.
