= Wine (disambiguation) =

Wine is an alcoholic beverage made from fermented grapes.

Wine may also refer to:

== Drinks ==
- Fruit wine, wine made from fruit other than grapes
- Rice wine, wine made from rice

== Entertainment ==
- Wine (1913 film), a comedy short starring Fatty Arbuckle
- Wine (1924 film), an American comedy-drama directed by Louis J. Gasnier
- "Wine" (song), by Suran featuring Changmo from the 2017 EP Walkin'
- Wine (dance), Caribbean style of dance
- "Wine", a song by Taeyeon from the 2019 album Purpose
- "Wine", a song by Teenage Joans from the 2021 EP Taste of Me
- WINE (AM), a Connecticut, US radio station
- WUFO, a New York, US, radio station which formerly used the call sign WINE

== People ==
- Wine (surname)
- Wine (bishop) (died before 672)

== Other ==
- Wine (software), a program designed to allow Microsoft Windows applications to run on Unix-like operating systems
- Wine (color)
- Wine TV, a defunct television channel
- World Is Not Enough (spacecraft propulsion), a United States space project, abbreviated as WINE

== See also ==
- Red Wine (disambiguation)
