= Warren Warwick =

American pediatrician (died 2016)

Warren J. Warwick
- Died: February 15, 2016
- Education: University of Minnesota (MD)
- Occupation: Pediatric pulmonologist

Warren J. Warwick was an American pediatrician known for co-inventing a chest wall oscillation device called the Vest Airway Clearance System, or "The Vest", a mechanical vest for clearing the lungs of children with cystic fibrosis. He was a professor of pediatric pulmonology at the University of Minnesota, where he was a faculty member for over 50 years. He was the director of the Cystic Fibrosis Center at the University of Minnesota from 1962 to 1999.
