= Dorothy Hansine Andersen =

American physician (1901–1963)

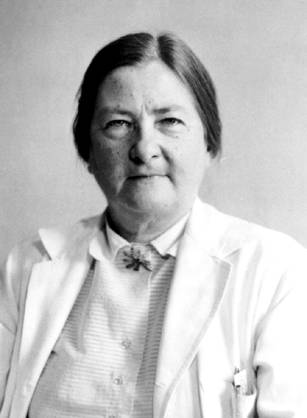
- Born: May 15, 1901; Asheville, North Carolina, U.S.
- Died: March 3, 1963 (aged 61); New York, New York, U.S.
- Education: Mount Holyoke College; Johns Hopkins University School of Medicine (MD); Columbia University (DMSc)
- Occupations: Pathologist; Pediatrician
- Employers: Strong Memorial Hospital; Columbia University College of Physicians and Surgeons; Babies Hospital of New York; (now Morgan Stanley Children's Hospital)
- Known for: Identifying and naming cystic fibrosis
- Awards: Honorary Fellow of the American Academy of Pediatrics; Honorary Chair of the Cystic Fibrosis Research Foundation (now the Cystic Fibrosis Foundation); Posthumously inducted into the National Women's Hall of Fame (2002)

Dorothy Hansine Andersen (May 15, 1901 – March 3, 1963) was the American physician and researcher who first identified and named cystic fibrosis. During her almost thirty year tenure at Babies Hospital of Columbia-Presbyterian Medical Center (now Morgan Stanley Children's Hospital), Andersen not only identified CF and its inheritance through a recessive gene, she was also at the forefront of developing diagnostic tests and life-extending treatments for the disease. Andersen was also active in researching other diseases that are diagnosed in children. She was the first to describe glycogen storage disease type IV, which, in recognition of her contributions, became known as Andersen's Disease. Her research on heart malformations informed the development of open heart surgery and the training of new surgeons.

During her lifetime, she was recognized by multiple organizations for her contributions to medicine, including by the American Academy of Pediatrics as an honorary fellow and by the Cystic Fibrosis Research Foundation (now the Cystic Fibrosis Foundation) as the honorary chair. In 2002, she was posthumously inducted into the National Women's Hall of Fame.

== Early life ==
Dorothy Hansine Andersen was born May 15, 1901 in Asheville, North Carolina to Mary Louise (née Mason) and Hans Peter Andersen. She was an only child. Her father, who had emigrated from Denmark as a child, graduated from Dartmouth College in 1886 and soon thereafter began his lifelong career with the YMCA. Andersen's mother, Mary Louise, graduated from Rockford College and began to attend Wilson College, but illness forced her to withdraw before graduating.

In 1905, the Andersen family relocated to Summit, New Jersey. Andersen spent her summers in St Johnsbury, Vermont, where her father's family was based. In 1914, Andersen's father died, and she and her mother, who was already suffering from a long-term illness, relocated to St Johnsbury soon thereafter. Andersen attended St. Johnsbury Academy, a boarding school that her father had also attended. The academy's offer of free tuition for local residents may have been part of why Andersen and her mother relocated to the town in 1915.

After graduating from St Johnsbury Academy in 1918, Andersen enrolled at Mount Holyoke College. Andersen's college years were marked by upheaval: World War I was ending, the Spanish Flu had swept the country including the Mount Holyoke campus, and Andersen's mother died in 1920, leaving her an orphan with tuition and room and board to pay. Despite this personal tragedy, she graduated from Mount Holyoke in 1922 with a major in zoology and physiology and a minor in chemistry. She began her medical degree in the fall of that same year.

== Career ==
After receiving her MD from Johns Hopkins University School of Medicine in 1926, Andersen intended to pursue a career as a surgeon, but because she was a female doctor in the 1920s, she could not find a position as a surgical resident. Instead, Andersen began her career as an assistant in anatomy at Strong Memorial Hospital in Rochester, New York. In 1929 she began teaching at Columbia University College of Physicians and Surgeons as an assistant instructor in pathology. In 1935, she was awarded a doctorate in medical science from Columbia University for her dissertation, "The Relation of the Endocrine Glands to the Female Reproductive Cycle."

In 1935, Andersen, then a new assistant pathologist at Babies Hospital of Columbia-Presbyterian Medical Center, began the research that would lead her to describe and name cystic fibrosis. That year, Andersen performed an autopsy on a 3-year-old girl whose cause of death had been reported as celiac disease. However, Andersen observed several pathological abnormalities not typical of celiac disease, including lungs clogged with thick secretions and fibrous cysts in the pancreas, which led her to investigate an alternative cause of death. Looking for similar cases, Andersen collected records of other autopsies that cited celiac disease as a cause of death. She also contacted researchers at other hospitals and combed the academic literature for other cases of patients who exhibited the traits she had observed. In total, she collected almost 49 cases of what she would call cystic fibrosis.

Based on this research, Andersen described and named CF for the first time in a 1938 article published in the American Journal of Diseases of Children. Until this point, CF had usually been diagnosed as celiac disease, because children with both diseases could not gain weight. Less often, children with undiagnosed CF were identified first as patients with recurrent pneumonia and no reported nutritional issues. Although Andersen first noticed macroscopic abnormalities in the lungs and pancreas, her description of the disease was based on the microscopic observation of cysts that formed around the acini in the pancreas. Other contemporary researchers also described cases of CF, but their research was less thorough and included many fewer patients. In his "History of Cystic Fibrosis," James Littlewood explains the significance of Andersen's contribution: "[Her] 1938 publication resulted in CF being recognized as a specific entity. Andersen's meticulous study was initiated to review the clinical, laboratory and autopsy findings of children with celiac disease to define the criteria for identifying those whose condition was caused by pancreatic disease. She collected cases in which the presence of a definite pancreatic histological abnormality had been identified, and she described in great detail the clinical and autopsy findings of 49 such children."

Through careful observation followed by thorough research, Andersen had identified and described a previously hidden, and therefore untreatable, disease. Brian O'Sullivan, a pediatric pulmonologist at the Geisel School of Medicine at Dartmouth, explained why he teaches his medical students about Andersen's extraordinary identification of CF: "There's the old saying, "Luck favors the prepared mind." The luck was that she was in a position where she saw some children, unfortunately, who had died of this problem. The prepared mind is Dorothy. . . . she's just brilliant, and she put this puzzle together. And so she recognized that she was seeing a group of children who had some of the hallmarks of celiac disease but on autopsy had very different problems."

After recognizing and describing CF as a disease, Andersen continued her research into its pathology. In 1946, she and Richard Hodges published research that correctly concluded CF was a genetic disease. Based on the prevalence in the population, they also noted that it behaved like a recessive trait.

Andersen was also instrumental in developing methods to diagnose CF. In 1942, she described the first method for diagnosing the disease in living patients: a laboratory test evaluated the pancreatic juices secreted into the duodenum, which is the first part of the small intestine. This test allowed Babies Hospital to begin the first successful diagnoses and treatment of CF in the world. Building on her first diagnostic test, Andersen theorized that newborns could be screened for the disease by measuring immunoreactive trypsinogen (an enzyme secreted by the pancreas) in the blood.

Andersen not only introduced the first successful CF test which relied on an invasive endoscopy, but her research was also key to the development of the non-invasive sweat test, which is still used to diagnose patients. Her insight that led to the test once again depended on "luck favor[ing] the prepared mind." In 1948 a heat wave in New York led to several children being admitted to Babies Hospital for heat exhaustion. Andersen noticed that the majority of these patients had CF and hypothesized that their susceptibility to heat exhaustion was related to a difference in their sweat. Drawing on that insight, Andersen (along with medical resident Walter Kessler) published a 1951 paper with the first observation that the sweat of patients with CF was different from those without the disease: sweat from patients with CF had higher chloride content.

Despite her pivotal role in the research that led to the sweat test, Andersen often receives less credit than she deserves. Andersen's forgotten role in the development of the sweat test is an example of the Matilda effect, the bias that leads to research being attributed to male contributors over female contributors. Two additional papers on the topic were published in 1953, both of which cited Andersen's 1951 study, which is evidence of its importance in further research. Paul di Sant'Agnese, an author on both subsequent papers, often receives full credit for the research and development of the sweat test.

While the publication record shows that Andersen initially observed the difference in the sweat of CF patients, she also might have played a larger role in the development of the test. In his biography of Andersen, Scott Baird observes that "it is likely that Andersen, a meticulous researcher who was not in the habit of leaving her own hypotheses uninvestigated, had a greater role in the CF sweat studies than is currently recognized; if so, her role was minimized by di Sant'Agnese."

Andersen also developed the first treatments for CF. She retrospectively published her results for general treatments, including a high-protein, low-fat diet, vitamin supplements, and replacement therapy for pancreatic enzymes. She also published a joint paper with di Sant'Agnese on the use of antibiotics for the lung infections that all CF patients experience.

In addition to her research on CF, Andersen contributed to the understanding of glycogen storage diseases and cardiac malformations. She first published findings on glycogen storage disease in 1941. In 1956, Andersen described a rare glycogen storage disease, which, in her honor, is now known as Andersen's Disease or Glycogen storage disease type IV. The disease is one of many rare glycogen storage diseases that are usually diagnosed in infancy or early childhood.

Andersen also investigated inherited heart malformations in children. Her research was so thorough that when surgeons set out to conduct the first open heart surgeries, they consulted with Andersen and referred to the specimens she had collected. Her systematic approach to studying heart malformations became part of the basis for training future heart surgeons.

== Personal life and death ==
Andersen's grave at Oak Woods Cemetery

As an adult, Andersen's personal life does not appear to be defined by romantic relationships or connections to her family. Instead, she shared her interests with a wide group of friends that included those she mentored. In her memoir, Dr Celia N. Ores, a pediatrician Andersen hired as a resident, remembers the warm atmosphere that Andersen created: "Dr Dorothy occasionally invited us to her country home in New Jersey. Her home sat on 100 acres of forest. She built three primitive log cabin-style structures from her birch trees in a clearing in the woods. There was a wood burning stove and no running water; it was quite rustic. She was a great cook, an engaging storyteller and, all in all, a terrific hostess. She invited a number of guests for weekends and assigned chores all around. I harvested mint to marinate in a mix of Jack Daniels and sugar for mint juleps she concocted. Others chopped wood for the stove."

Andersen eschewed convention and was known for being unkempt, with a cigarette dangling from her lips, trailing a long ash, giving the impression of a doctor focused solely on her work. She is remembered as a woman interested in the outdoors and hands-on skills like carpentry, roofing, and bricklaying. She is also known for her bravery in standing up for women's equality and her kindness as a mentor.

Andersen loved to travel, taking trips to Europe for business and pleasure throughout her life. She also read Latin, French and Italian, and spoke German.

Andersen died from lung cancer at sixty-one years old on March 3, 1963 at Presbyterian Hospital. She was buried at Oak Woods Cemetery in Chicago.

== Legacy and honors ==
Dorothy Andersen's most important legacy is the identification of CF, as well as her contributions to methods of diagnosing and treating the disease. Before Andersen began her research, patients with CF did not live past childhood. It is expected that babies born with CF between 2018 and 2022 will typically live into their 50s, 60s and beyond. Andersen's research paved the way for these advancements. The highest honor the Cystic Fibrosis Foundation bestows now includes Andersen in its name: The Dorothy Andersen and Paul di Sant'Agnese Distinguished Scientific Achievement Award.

== Depiction in media ==
Dorothy Andersen is the subject of the 2021 podcast season of Lost Women of Science,"The Pathologist in the Basement." She also features in Celia N. Ores's memoir, Reading Pushkin in Siberia: And Other Tales of Survival.

== Awards ==
- 1939, E. Mead Johnson Award
- 1948, Borden Award Research in Nutrition
- 1952, Citation of Mount Holyoke College
- 1954, Elizabeth Blackwell Award
- 1963, Great Heart Award of the Variety Club of Philadelphia
- 1963, Distinguished Service Medal of the Columbia Presbyterian Medical Center
- honorary fellow of the American Academy of Pediatrics
- honorary chair of the Cystic Fibrosis Research Foundation
- 2002, posthumously inducted into the National Women's Hall of Fame.

== Sources ==
- Baird, John Scott (2022). Dorothy Hansine Andersen. doi:10.1007/978-3-030-87484-1. ISBN 978-3-030-87483-4.
- Ores, Celia N. (2016). Reading Pushkin in Siberia. Lulu Publishing Services. ISBN 978-1-4834-4947-0.
