= IRT =

IRT or irt may refer to:

== Organizations ==
- Indiana Repertory Theatre, an American company of actors
- Institut für Rundfunktechnik, a German research institute for broadcasters
- Interborough Rapid Transit Company, a defunct New York subway operator
  - A Division (New York City Subway), also known as the IRT Division

== Science and technology ==
- Imagery Rehearsal Therapy, see Nightmare disorder § Treatment
- Immunoreactive trypsinogen, newborn screening test for cystic fibrosis
- Infrared thermography
- Infrared Telescope, on the STS-51-F Space Shuttle mission
- Item response theory, to interpret psychometric tests

== Television ==
- Ice Road Truckers, a reality television series
- International Response Team, a fictional body in Criminal Minds

== Other uses ==
- IR Tanger, a Moroccan association football club
- Incident response team, a group of people who respond to an emergency
- International Registry of Tartans, a Scottish Tartans Authority textile database
