= Paul di Sant'Agnese =

American physician

Paul di Sant'Agnese (1914–2005) was the founder of the Cystic Fibrosis Foundation and of Cystic Fibrosis Care in the United States. He was a physician, researcher and one of the first clinicians who devoted his life to understanding and conquering cystic fibrosis through his work at the Columbia University Medical Center, New York City. Undoubtedly the major advance during the Fifties was the recognition of the increased salt content of the sweat in people with CF by Paul di Sant’Agnese in 1953.

During the heat wave of 1949, he was the first to recognize that infants suffering from cystic fibrosis were at special risk for heat prostration. He thus discovered that sweat was abnormal in CF.

His discovery of abnormalities in sweat electrolytes lead to the sweat test, which is a primary method for diagnosing cystic fibrosis and was developed and improved over the next decade. This remains the cornerstone of the diagnosis of the disease— but also opened up areas of research that ultimately helped to identify the basic defect in cystic fibrosis.
