= Paul Quinton =

American physiologist (born 1944)

- Born: Paul M. Quinton; 1944 (age 81–82)
- Education: University of Texas at Austin; Rice University (PhD)
- Occupations: Physiologist; professor
- Children: 1 (adopted)

Paul M. Quinton (born 1944) is an American physiologist known for his research on cystic fibrosis. He is a professor of pediatrics at the University of California San Diego and a professor of Biomedical Sciences at the University of California Riverside.

== Early life and education ==
Quinton was born in 1944. He grew up in Southeast Texas. As a child, he suffered from chronic coughing and often had unusual salt stains on his clothes from excessive sweating. His mother would cover him with Vicks VapoRub to ease his cough.

In college at the University of Texas Austin, after coughing up blood, Quinton began investigating his possible condition looking into bronchitis and bronchiectasis. He noticed a footnote that referenced cystic fibrosis. Its definition gave him chills as it was so similar to his symptoms. His CF was confirmed by a sweat test. After his diagnosis, he committed to find the underlying causes of the disease.

Quinton received a PhD from Rice University.

== Career ==
Quinton focussed his research on sweat glands, exploring how salt is transported in and out of cells. Sweat glands were easier to study in CF patients as most of the other organs of the body are heavily damaged by the disease making analysis difficult. In CF patients, sweat glands are not destroyed, they just produce a high concentration of salt in the sweat. He removed his own sweat glands to study. He discovered that in CF patients, the cellular mechanisms responsible for reabsorbing salt during sweating were dysfunctional, leading to the characteristic symptoms of the disease, including thick mucus buildup that can cause lung failure.

In the early 1980s, Stanford University psychologist Jeffrey Wine, an expert researcher of invertebrate nervous systems, joined Quinton's lab after his daughter was diagnosed with CF. He would go on to found his own CF laboratory at Stanford.

In 2015, Quinton and a group of prominent cystic fibrosis doctors, after three years of private dialogue, publicly criticized Vertex Pharmaceuticals for overcharging for its breakthrough CF drugs. The group went public with their objection three weeks after the company won US approval for Orkambi which would help around half of the 30,000 Americans with CF. The group was disturbed by the $259,000 per patient annual price the drug, which is more than five times the annual salary of the average American family. Quintion called the price "egregious."

Vertex defended its pricing by citing the substantial investments made in drug development and the necessity of generating revenue to fund further research. It acknowledged the need for sustainable profits to continue its work in expanding treatment options for cystic fibrosis. Quinton noted the substantial financial rewards granted to Vertex executives, including the board awarding more than $53 million in one-time bonuses to twelve senior executives. He questioned the ethics of such compensation when the drugs are financially inaccessible for many patients. The group made efforts to seek a transparent dialogue regarding drug costs, including proposals for public discussions, but their concerns were largely ignored.

== Awards and honors ==
In 2000, Quinton was inducted as a Fellow of the American Association for the Advancement of Science.

== Personal life ==
Quinton is married. He and his wife adopted a son.
