= Postural drainage =

- ICD-9-CM: 93.99
- MeSH: D015916

Postural drainage (PD) is the drainage of lung secretions using gravity. It is used to treat a variety of conditions that cause the build-up of secretions in the lungs.

== Uses ==
Postural drainage is used to treat any condition that causes the build-up of secretions in bronchopulmonary segments. These include:

- bronchiectasis
- lung abscesses
- cystic fibrosis
- atelectasis
- chronic obstructive pulmonary disease (COPD)
- pneumonia
- postoperative lung damage (after some thoracic surgery)
- COVID-19

Patients must receive physiotherapy to learn to tip themselves into a position in which the lobe can be drained.

== Contraindications ==
Postural drainage is often not suitable for infants in the neonatal intensive care unit, who may have lots of equipment attached to them. Postural drainage is more difficult if patients experience poor mobility, poor posture, pain, anxiety, and skin damage, usually requiring adaptations to the technique. The Trendelenburg position which is a head down position is relatively contraindicated in patients who have uncontrolled hypertension, orthopnea, recent gross hemoptysis, and in those with an intracranial pressure more than 20 mm Hg. Precautions should be taken where there are rib fractures, osteoporosis, bronchospasm, and recent transplants.

== Risks ==
Postural drainage is considered safe and effective, but may cause some side effects. The procedure is discontinued if the patient complains of headache, discomfort, dizziness, palpitations, fatigue, or dyspnea. Patients may be dyspneic after the various maneuvers, since the head-down position increases the work of breathing, reduces tidal volume, and decreases functional residual capacity (FRC).

== Technique ==
In postural drainage, the patient's body is positioned so that the trachea is inclined downward and below the affected chest area. The body is positioned so that secretions drain into sequentially larger bronchi. Frames, tilt tables, and pillows may be used to support patients in these positions. Up to 12 postures may be used. Patients may need time to adapt to certain postures.

Postural drainage is done at least three times daily for up to 60 minutes, with 30 minutes being common. It can be done in the night to reduce coughing at night (although PD should be avoided after meals), or in the morning to clear secretions accumulated during the night. Bronchodilators can be used 15 minutes before PD is done to maximise its benefits. The most affected area is drained first to prevent infected secretions spilling into healthy lung. Drainage time varies, but each position requires 10 minutes. If an entire hemithorax is involved, each lobe has to be drained individually, but a maximum of three position per session is considered sufficient.

== Use with other physiotherapies ==
Postural drainage is often used in conjunction with a technique for loosening secretions in the chest cavity such as chest percussion. Chest percussion is performed by clapping the back or chest with a cupped hand. Bronchodilator medications may also be used before postural drainage to improve its effectiveness. Alternatively, a mechanical vibrator may be used in some cases to facilitate loosening of secretions. There are drainage positions for all segments of the lung. These positions can be modified depending on the patient's condition.

Postural drainage may be followed by airway clearance techniques of active cycle of breathing and huff coughing to help loosen and expel secretions from the airways.
