= Cystic fibrosis–related diabetes =

Cystic fibrosis-related diabetes
- Specialty: Endocrinology

Cystic fibrosis–related diabetes (CFRD) is diabetes specifically caused by cystic fibrosis, a genetic condition. Cystic fibrosis related diabetes mellitus (CFRD) develops with age, and the median age at diagnosis is 21 years. It is an example of type 3c diabetes – diabetes that is caused by damage to the pancreas from another disease or condition.

== Presentation ==
CFRD shares features of both type 1 diabetes and type 2 diabetes. The primary cause of CFRD is insulin deficiency due to pancreatic scarring. CFRD patients are typically young and are not obese, and lack metabolic syndrome features. The cause of CFRD is not autoimmune. CFRD patients can also have insulin resistance, but ketosis is rare.

== Pathophysiology ==
The endocrine pancreatic function deterioration appears to be secondary to chronic pancreatitis and subsequent scarring associated with CF. The thick mucus caused by CF is considered to block the pancreatic ducts causing chronic pancreatitis. The failure of the chloride channel leads to less salt and water in the mucus. It is also probable that the failed chloride channel leads to high chloride levels within cells which leads to increased cations (especially potassium and calcium) in those cells. This may also lead to abnormal functioning of the islets of Langerhans cells, the insulin-producing endocrine glands of the pancreas. Inflammation of the surrounding exocrine pancreatic cells is considered to affect the Islet cells but abnormal intracellular electrolytes may be a better explanation as to why CF persons (pwCF) have a high incidence of diabetes. Abnormal intracellular electrolytes may also the reason pwCF have a high incidence of Adrenal failure, osteoporosis and Hyperparathyroidism. Muscle function is also likely to be affected including heart muscle function. Research is needed into intracellular electrolytes in pwCF.

== Epidemiology ==
CFRD occurs in some 20% of adolescents and 40–50% of adults affected by CF. Though rare in children, it has been described in CF patients of all ages, including infants. Beginning in the teenage years, CFRD has an annual incidence of ~3%, and may be more common in females. It is associated with more severe CF gene mutation types.

As survival of CF patients has steadily increased in past decades, CFRD is an increasingly common – and currently the most common – complication of CF.

== See also ==
- Cystic fibrosis
- Chronic pancreatitis
