= Wine (surname) =

Wine or Wines is a surname. Notable people with the surname include:

- Bobby Wine (born 1938), American baseball player, coach and manager; father of Robbie
- Bobi Wine (born 1982), Ugandan politician
- Charles C. Wine (1901–1974), Arkansas lawyer
- Jeffrey Wine (fl. 1970s–2010s), American biologist, professor
- Ollie Wines (born 1994), Australian Rules Football player
- Robbie Wine (born 1962), American baseball player and coach; son of Bobby
- Sherwin Wine (1928–2007), American rabbi
- Toni Wine (born 1947), American songwriter
