= Type 3c diabetes =

Type 3c diabetes (also known as pancreatogenic diabetes) is diabetes that comes secondary to pancreatic diseases, involving the endocrine and exocrine (digestive) functions of the pancreas. It also occurs following surgical removal of the pancreas.

Around 5–10% of cases of diabetes in the Western world are related to pancreatic diseases. Chronic pancreatitis is most often the cause.

== Presentation ==
The symptoms of Type 3c diabetes are the same as other forms of diabetes. They include:

- Increased thirst (polydipsia) and dry mouth.
- Frequent urination.
- Fatigue.
- Blurred vision.
- Unexplained weight loss.
- Numbness or tingling in hands or feet.
- Slow-healing sores or cuts.
- Frequent skin and/or vaginal yeast infections.

People with Type 3c diabetes typically also have symptoms of exocrine pancreatic insufficiency, which include:

- Abdominal pain, gas and bloating.
- Constipation.
- Diarrhoea.
- Fatty stools (pale, oily, foul-smelling faeces that float).
- Unexplained weight loss.

The same complications that occur for other types of diabetics (type 1 and type 2) may occur for type 3c diabetics. These include retinopathy, nephropathy, neuropathy, and cardiovascular disease. Patients with this condition are advised to follow the same risk-reduction guidelines as the other diabetics do and keep blood sugars as normal as possible to minimize any complications.

== Cause ==
There are multiple causes. Some of which identified are:

- Pancreatic disease
- Pancreatic resection
- Chronic pancreatitis (caused by exocrine insufficiency, maldigestion, and malnutrition).
- Lacking genes in the E2F group.

== Diagnosis ==
Diagnostic Criteria for T3cDM
Major criteria (all must be fulfilled):
- Presence of exocrine pancreatic insufficiency (according to monoclonal fecal elastase-1 or direct function tests).
- Pathological pancreatic imaging: (by endoscopic ultrasound, MRI, or CT)
- Absence of T1DM-associated autoimmune markers (autoantibodies).
Minor Criteria:
- Impaired β-cell function
- No excessive insulin resistance (e.g. as measured by HOMA-IR).
- Impaired incretin (e.g. GIP) or pancreatic polypeptide secretion.
- Low serum levels of lipid (fat) soluble vitamins (A, D, E, or K).

== Management ==
The condition can be managed by many factors.

=== Medications ===
Medications such as insulin may be given in order to lower blood sugars. For not so high blood sugars, oral treatments in the form of a pill or capsule may be given.

Usually, insulin requirements are lower than in type 1 diabetes (SAID). However, therapeutic challenges may arise from the fact that hypoglycaemia is a common complication, owing to the lack of alpha cells.

== See also ==
- Diabetes mellitus
- Pancreatitis
- Chronic pancreatitis
- Exocrine pancreatic insufficiency
- Cystic fibrosis–related diabetes
