= Chest wall oscillation =

Medical procedure

- MeSH: D035641

Chest wall oscillation is when devices are used in airway clearance therapy to clear excess mucus from lung airways (bronchi and bronchioles). It is principally used in the treatment of cystic fibrosis, but is gaining use in the treatment of other diseases, such as bronchiectasis, COPD, cerebral palsy and muscular dystrophy, in which excessive mucus can block airways due to excessive production or impaired clearance.

This "passive system" is not dependent on the effort of the patient. It uses a compressor to inflate and deflate the vest rhythmically at timed intervals and thus imposes high frequency chest wall oscillations (HFCWO) that are transferred to the lungs. These oscillations thin thixotropic airway mucus, facilitating its removal by coughing. Delivery of air to the vest can be controlled manually.

== History ==
The Vest system was developed by Warren Warwick, a pediatrician and cystic fibrosis expert, and Leland Hansen MPH, a senior scientist at the University of Minnesota, which licensed the product to American Biosystems in 1988. It is the original High Frequency Chest Wall Oscillation Device by Advanced Respiratory, Inc (ARI), formerly American Biosystems, Inc., in Saint Paul, Minnesota, United States of America. In 2003, Hillrom acquired ARI.
