= Immunoreactive trypsinogen =

Substance measured in newborn screening tests for cystic fibrosis

Measurement of immunoreactive trypsinogen (IRT) in blood of newborn babies is an assay in rapidly increasing use as a screening test for cystic fibrosis (CF).

In CF, there is poor release from pancreatic ducts. Trypsinogen is a pancreatic enzyme precursor found in the blood that is elevated in most of those with CF at birth, regardless of whether their mutation is pancreatic sufficient or insufficient. The concentration of IRT is elevated in babies with CF since pancreatic ducts are partially blocked leading to abnormal enzyme drainage. Heterozygous carriers of cystic fibrosis can have a raised IRT and it is therefore not diagnostic in isolation.

IRT is measured in routine heel-prick blood taken for biochemical screening of all newborn infants born in the UK. This test is one of a number of completed in newborn screening (the "Guthrie Test"). In Australia it is known 94% of those with eventual diagnosis of CF have a positive IRT on newborn screen. Samples with a raised IRT (defined as highest 1% of values) are then screened for common CF gene mutations. Each centre has a slightly different gene panel; currently 40–50 of the most common genes are sequenced. However, there are more than 2,000 known mutations, so gene panel testing does miss occasional CF patients.

If gene testing finds one mutation they will then have a sweat test to help confirm the diagnosis. Sweat testing is more likely to be equivocal in infants and typically not attempted in those under 5 kg. If sweat test is positive more comprehensive gene testing is usually performed, especially in the current era of genotype specific treatments for CF. If two mutations are found they are diagnosed with CF, but patients can be diagnosed with CF on the basis of an abnormal sweat test alone.

== United States Testing Protocols ==
As of the year 2010, immunoreactive trypsinogen (IRT)-based newborn screening programs for cystic fibrosis have been implemented across the country. However, the specific testing protocol varies by state. Certain states require only a single immunoreactive trypsinogen test to be performed within hours or days of birth before requiring additional diagnostic screenings for infants with elevated IRT levels. Of these, some follow up one elevated IRT result with DNA screening to identify cystic fibrosis-specific genetic mutations. Other states mandate two IRT blood tests to be performed (one immediately after birth and one after a period of two weeks) before requiring any further testing. Newborns found to have abnormally high levels of immunoreactive trypsinogen and/or positive DNA screening results are referred to specialized facilities that perform sweat chloride tests to either confirm or rule out a diagnosis of cystic fibrosis.
