= Jeffrey Wine =

American biologist

Jeffrey J. Wine is an American biologist and professor. He is currently at Stanford University and an Elected Fellow of the American Association for the Advancement of Science. His research has focused on the genetic disease cystic fibrosis.
