= Red Wine =

Red wine is red-coloured wine.

Red Wine may also refer to:

== Film ==
- Red Wine (1928 film), an American film
- Red Wine (2013 film), a Malayalam-language Indian film

== Music ==
- "Red Wine", a song by Woody Guthrie from the album Ballads of Sacco & Vanzetti, 1960
- "Red Wine", a song by Mannheim Steamroller from the album Fresh Aire IV, 1981
- "Red Wine", a song by Lukas Graham from the album Lukas Graham, 2012
- "Red Wine", a song by Kelly Rowland from the album Talk a Good Game, 2013
- "Red Wine", a song by MØ from the album Forever Neverland, 2018
- "Red Wine", a song by Rae Sremmurd from the album SR3MM, 2018
- "Red Wine", a song by Megan Thee Stallion from the album Traumazine, 2022

== See also ==
- "Red Red Wine", a song by Neil Diamond
- Wine red, a color
