= Orla Tinsley =

Journalist, artist and campaigner from County Kildare, Ireland

Orla Tinsley is an Irish journalist, campaigner and multimedia artist.

== Work ==
Tinsley began writing for The Irish Times on the state of cystic fibrosis care in Ireland in 2005 when they were 18. Their work launched a decade-long campaign to improve awareness of and healthcare services for cystic fibrosis in Ireland. The campaign became a nationwide community effort, sustained by Tinsley's articles in The Irish Times about lack of facilities, the deaths of friends, and the stories and energy of people with CF and their families and communities around Ireland.

In September 2008, for their work they were named Rehab Young Person of the Year In April 2009, they appeared on The Late Late Show after writing several pieces in The Irish Times holding government to account on broken promises to build an adult cystic fibrosis unit in Dublin. In 2009, they began an internship in The Irish Times. That same year the promised government funding for the cystic fibrosis unit was pulled and the campaign reprised. Several campaigners from the previous had died. Tinsley and other new campaigners featured on RTE Liveline Show which played an important role in the campaign. Tinsley was named Irish Tatler Magazine's Woman of the Year in 2009. In 2010, they were awarded the Young Medical Journalist of the Year award.

=== Producer and writer ===
In April 2011, Tinsley presented, co-wrote and researched a special documentary for RTÉ's flagship current affairs programme Prime Time to apply pressure for building to begin at St Vincent's Hospital in Dublin.

=== Author ===
In September 2011, their memoir Salty Baby : A memoir was published by Hachette. The Sunday Times described the book as "gonzo journalism". It was shortlisted for Best Newcomer at the Bórd Gáis Irish Book Awards.

== Activism ==
=== The Adult Cystic Fibrosis Unit campaign ===
In July 2012, after campaign work over numerous years, a dedicated Cystic Fibrosis Unit opened. The ward block has an outpatient and inpatient facility for people with cystic fibrosis. It also has a floor of isolation rooms for people with cancer and another floor for those with infectious diseases who need isolation.

Similar units have opened in Cork University Hospital and University Hospital Limerick.

=== LGBT rights ===
In 2012 and 2013, Tinsley focused on the rights of transgender people to attain gender recognition in Ireland. They were named Broadcaster / Journalist of the Year by the Gay and Lesbian Association in 2013.

=== New cystic fibrosis drug ===
In late 2012, Tinsley launched a campaign to get Kalydeco into Ireland after experts rejected making the drug available because it was too expensive. The drug is the first to treat the cause of cystic fibrosis and not just the symptoms. In February 2013 the Minister for Health announced that the drug would be made available.

Since late 2013, Tinsley is one of the first people in the world to be treated by the second new cystic fibrosis drug lumacaftor/ivacaftor which treats the most common mutation of CF. The drug has proven to improve lung function and health for people with CF.

== Personal life ==
Tinsley received a double lung transplant in December 2017.

Tinsley is queer and non-binary.

== Media ==
Tinsley conceived, co-produced and featured in an Irish documentary Orla Tinsley: Warrior, which follows the process of their double lung transplant in New York in 2018. In 2020 the film was nominated as a finalist in the New York Festivals TV and Film Awards.

== Awards and honours ==
- Rehab Young Person of the Year (2008)
- Irish Tatler Magazine Woman of the Year (2009)
- Healthcare Person of the Year, Irish Healthcare Centre Awards(2013)
- Broadcaster / Journalist of the Year Gay and Lesbian Association Award (2013)
- Kildare's All time Greatest Person 2019 REVEALED: The winner of Kildare's All Time Greats is...
- Honorary Doctorate - University College Dublin
