= Laura Rothenberg =

American writer

- Laura Rothenberg on the cover of her 2003 memoir
- Born: February 3, 1981
- Died: March 20, 2003 (aged 22)
- Education: Brown University
- Occupation: Author
- Notable work: Breathing for a Living

Laura Elizabeth Rothenberg (February 3, 1981 – March 20, 2003) was an American author. She wrote a memoir describing her life with cystic fibrosis called Breathing for a Living.

== Biography ==
Laura Rothenberg was born February 3, 1981 and she grew up in New York City. Shortly after birth she was diagnosed with cystic fibrosis, a fatal disease with varying life expectancy. Goddaughter of Debra Winger, Rothenberg attended The Chapin School in Manhattan and then Brown University where she studied English until the deterioration of her cystic fibrosis forced her to withdraw and she decided to pursue a lung transplant, though it posed its own health risks. She received a double lung transplant at age 20, in July 2001. In the spring of 2002, she returned to Brown where she took a course on autobiographical writing, beginning writing that formed the basis of her later memoir. She also began recording audio of her experience when a radio producer, Joe Richman, lent her a tape recorder. Rothenberg's audio diary, My So-Called Lungs: A Young Girl's Diary of Living with Dying from Cystic Fibrosis, aired on NPR on August 5, 2002.

Health again forced Rothenberg to withdraw from Brown in November 2002 and on March 20, 2003, she died of chronic rejection of the transplant. Her memoir was published posthumously by Hyperion on May 12, 2003. Breathing for a Living describes her fight with cystic fibrosis and her decision to pursue a double lung transplant. A starred review in Publishers Weekly said, "Refusing to indulge in even a wisp of false hope or consolation, Rothenberg reminds us that there is a power in us that is greater than even the greatest suffering...an unforgettably real testament of the strength of one human spirit, and of our common human wish to know and say and be the truth. In The Washington Post, Roland Merullo wrote, "Those in the grasp of a fatal illness will recognize themselves here – the loneliness, the pain and hope – as will family members and friends. The rest of us, so often oblivious to our good luck, might be moved to set the book down between chapters and put our complaints in perspective."

== List of works ==
- "My So-Called Lungs", All Things Considered, NPR, August 5, 2002
- Breathing for a Living, Hyperion, 2003 ISBN 1-4013-0059-6
