= Airway clearance therapy =

Techniques to clear the respiratory airways

Airway clearance therapy is a non-pharmacological treatment that uses a number of airway clearance techniques to clear the respiratory airways of mucus and other secretions. Several respiratory diseases cause the normal mucociliary clearance mechanism to become impaired resulting in a build-up of mucus which obstructs breathing, and also affects the cough reflex. Mucus build-up can also cause infection, and subsequent inflammation, and repeated infections can result in damage to the airways, and the lung tissue.

All clearance techniques, other than basic coughing, rely on delivering vibrations to the airways in order to loosen the mucus that may then be coughed up and expelled as sputum. Techniques include manual chest physical therapy, and a number of devices. Devices include positive expiratory pressure, and oscillating positive expiratory pressure devices that are self-powered, and the vest that delivers oscillations externally to the chest wall.

All airway clearance therapies involve forced expiratory coughing called huffing to move secretions from the small airways to the large airways.

Respiratory therapists make recommendations and give guidance for appropriate airway clearance therapies. They also give instruction in the use of various airway clearance techniques.

== Clearance techniques ==
Airway clearance therapy uses different airway clearance techniques (ACTs) in a number of respiratory disorders including, cystic fibrosis, bronchitis, bronchiectasis, and chronic obstructive pulmonary disease to maintain respiratory health, and prevent the damaging consequences of inflammation. Techniques used are breathing, manual, and mechanical. They all need to be used with huff coughing which moves mucus from the small airways.

=== Breathing ===
Breathing techniques include the active cycle of breathing which includes huffing; and autogenic drainage, a technique that requires concentrated effort.

==== Huffing ====
Huffing or a huff cough, also called a forced expiration technique, helps to move mucus away from the lung wall so that it can finally be coughed out. Huffing needs to be carried out in a sitting position with the chin raised a little, and the mouth remaining open. A deep breath is taken to fill the lungs about 75 per cent, and held for two or three seconds. Breathing out is forceful and slow which helps to move the mucus from the smaller to the larger airways. A normal urge to cough at this point is repressed, and the breathing pattern is repeated a few times. A strong cough then follows to expel the mucus. Huffing forms part of the active cycle of breathing. Huffing as a clearance technique is different to the term of huffing used in substance inhalation.

==== Active cycle of breathing ====
The active cycle of breathing technique is carried out in three phases. Phase one is used to relax the airways; phase two involves moving the inhaled air to behind the mucus in order to clear it; phase three helps to clear the mucus out from the lungs.

Phase one

Gentle effortless breathing, in through the nose, and out through the mouth is used in phase one to relax the airways. The shoulders and upper chest are kept relaxed. On breathing out, the pursed lips method is advised. Keeping the lips pursed (as in kissing somebody) when exhaling creates a back pressure that keeps the airways open for longer. One recommendation is for six breaths of control to take place before phase two of the cycle.

Phase two

Phase two involves using exercises to expand the chest. Breathing is deep and may use a breath-hold of three seconds to move the air into the smaller airways, and reach behind the mucus. The out breath is unforced and may include some percussive clapping, or vibration.

Phase three

Using huff coughing, mucus is moved from the smaller airways to the larger airways, and needs to be continued until all the mucus is expelled.

==== Autogenic drainage ====
Autogenic drainage is a controlled airway clearance technique using different depths of inhalation, and different speeds of exhalation that enables mucus to be moved up the airway producing a voluntary cough. This method does not require any equipment, however, it is challenging to perform and appropriate training is required. Evidence supporting different techniques is limited. A review of the studies that have been conducted concluded that there is no strong evidence that autogenic drainage is better than other airway clearance techniques.

=== Manual ===
Chest physical therapy is a manual airway clearance therapy that uses postural drainage either on its own or combined with chest percussion (clapping). However, they are labour-intensive, and time-consuming, and mechanical devices are often used instead.

=== Mechanical ===
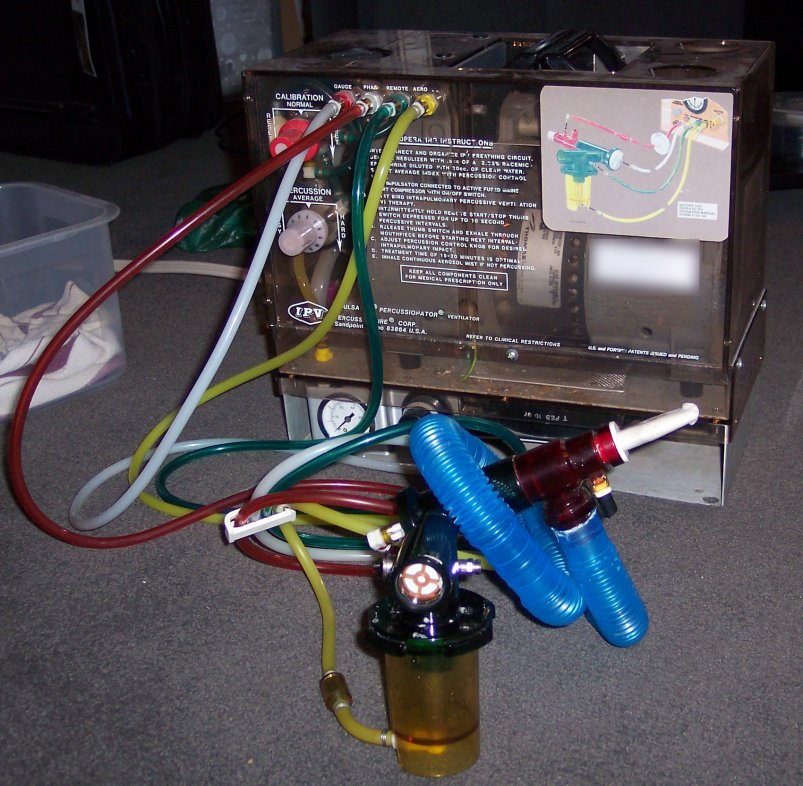
An intrapulmonary percussive ventilator machine

Devices used include positive expiratory pressure (PEP masks or mouthpieces), intrapulmonary percussive ventilators, mechanical insufflation-exsufflation known as a mechanically assisted cough, and airway oscillatory devices. Several mechanical techniques are used to dislodge mucus and encourage its expectoration. Chest percussion can be administered as a manual technique but can also be performed using specific devices that use chest wall oscillation or intrapulmonary percussive ventilation. Intrapulmonary percussive ventilators (IPVs) are machines which deliver short bursts of air through a mouthpiece to help to clear mucus. The air is delivered at a rate of approximately 150 pulses per minute and may be used with nebulized medication. Chest wall oscillation is a passive system that is not dependent on effort from the user. It involves the use of a special vest that employs the use of a compressor to inflate and deflate the vest rhythmically at timed intervals, and thus imposes high frequency chest wall oscillations that are transferred to the lungs. These oscillations thin airway mucus, and facilitate its removal by coughing. Delivery of air to the vest can be controlled manually.

Other methods such as biphasic cuirass ventilation, and associated clearance mode available in such devices, integrate a cough assistance phase, as well as a vibration phase for dislodging secretions. These are portable and adapted for home use.

Positive expiratory pressure physiotherapy consists of providing a back pressure to the airways during expiration. This effect is provided by devices that consist of a mask or a mouthpiece in which a resistance is applied only on the expiration phase. Operating principles of this technique seems to be the increase of gas pressure behind mucus through collateral ventilation along with a temporary increase in functional residual capacity preventing the early collapse of small airways during exhalation.

== See also ==
- Airway management
