= Sweat test =

- Purpose: measures concentration of chloride

The sweat test measures the concentration of chloride that is excreted in sweat. It is used to screen for cystic fibrosis (CF). Due to defective chloride channels (CFTR), the concentration of chloride in sweat is elevated in individuals with CF.

== Background ==
Cystic fibrosis is caused by defects in a protein found in many tissues, including the airways and the sweat glands. As a result, these tissues do not work properly. Sweat testing makes use of the fact that cystic fibrosis patients have defective sweat glands.

Sweat glands produce sweat through a well understood process of secretion and reabsorption of sodium chloride (salt). Secretion entails the movement of salt and water from sweat gland cells into the sweat duct. Reabsorption occurs in the duct with the movement of salt from the sweat back into sweat duct cells. What remains is sweat, a salt solution with a relatively finely tuned concentration of sodium and chloride.

For normal salt reabsorption to occur, individual ions of sodium and chloride must be taken from the sweat and moved back into cells of the sweat duct. These ions are moved by transporters called ion channels. In the case of sodium, there is a sodium channel; for chloride, there is a chloride channel called CFTR. For sweat to be produced with the proper concentrations of sodium and chloride, sodium channels and chloride channels (CFTRs) must work properly.

In cystic fibrosis, the CFTR chloride channel is defective, and does not allow chloride to be reabsorbed into sweat duct cells. Consequently, more sodium stays in the duct, and more chloride remains in the sweat. The concentration of chloride in sweat is therefore elevated in individuals with cystic fibrosis.

The concentration of sodium in sweat is also elevated in cystic fibrosis. Unlike CFTR chloride channels, sodium channels behave perfectly normally in cystic fibrosis. However, in order for the secretion to be electrically neutral, positively charged sodium cations remain in the sweat along with the negatively charged chloride anions. In this way, the chloride anions are said to "trap" the sodium cations.

== Method ==
Sweating is induced by pilocarpine iontophoresis. At the test site, an electrode is placed over gauze containing pilocarpine and electrolyte solution that will not interfere with the sodium and chloride measurement. A second electrode (without pilocarpine) will be placed at another site and a mild electric current will draw the pilocarpine into the skin where it stimulates the sweat glands.

The test site is carefully cleaned and dried, then a piece of preweighed filter paper is placed over the test site and covered with parafilm to prevent evaporation. Specialized collection devices may also be used. Sweat is collected for 30 minutes. The filter paper is retrieved and weighed to determine the weight of sweat collected. Several laboratory methods are then used to determine the sodium and chloride concentrations.

Before this method of inducing sweat was developed, the method was to place the entire person to be tested in a hemispherical chamber and slowly raise the humidity and temperature of the air inside.

== Results ==
=== Reference ranges ===
For infants up to and including 6 months of age, a chloride level of:

- Equal to or less than 29 mmol/L = CF is very unlikely
- 30 – 59 mmol/L = intermediate means that CF is possible
- Greater than or equal to 60 mmol/L = CF is likely to be diagnosed

For people older than 6 months of age, a chloride level of:

- Equal to or less than 39 mmol/L = CF is very unlikely
- 40 – 59 mmol/L = intermediate means that CF is possible
- Greater than or equal to 60 mmol/L = CF is likely to be diagnosed

=== Interpretation ===
Two reliable positive results on two separate days is diagnostic for CF. Because of the existence of milder variants, borderline or even near-borderline negative results may be used to diagnose CF. Clinical presentation, family history and patient age must be considered to interpret the results. Highly discordant sodium and chloride values may indicate technical errors.

=== Sources of error ===
Technical errors, insufficient sample, evaporation, contamination, dehydration, mineralocorticoid hormone therapy, and skin rash on the tested area may produce incorrect results. Positive test results may also be caused by malnutrition, adrenal insufficiency, glycogen storage diseases, hypothyroidism, hypoparathyroidism, nephrogenic diabetes insipidus, G6PD deficiency or ectodermal dysplasia.
