= Metropolis Technologies =

American technology company

- Company logo
- Industry: Artificial intelligence Parking industry
- Founded: 2017; 9 years ago
- Founder: Alexander Israel (CEO); Travis Kell; Peter Fisher; Courtney Fukuda
- Headquarters: Santa Monica: Nashville; New York City; Chicago; Seattle
- Number of employees: 20,000+ (2024)
- Subsidiaries: SP Plus Corporation
- Website: metropolis.io

Metropolis Technologies is an American technology company headquartered in Santa Monica, California. It is the largest parking operator in North America.

== Founding and key people ==
The company was founded in Venice, Los Angeles in 2017 by CEO Alexander Israel, with co-founders Travis Kell, Peter Fisher and Courtney Fukuda. In 2009, Israel co-founded and served as chief operating officer of ParkMe, a digital parking platform with a real-time database of parking information. In 2015, ParkMe was acquired by Inrix, a traffic data company that spun off from Microsoft Research.

== History ==
The company uses computer vision and deep learning algorithms to recognize registered members and process payments automatically through a mobile application. The company has headquarters in Santa Monica, Nashville, Tennessee, New York City, Seattle, and Chicago.

In 2022, Metropolis Technologies acquired the Nashville-based company Premier Parking.

In 2023, the company raised $1.8 billion in funding, led by investors Eldridge and 3L, before its $1.5 billion acquisition of SP Plus Corporation. The deal was completed in 2024, taking SP Plus private under a growth buyout. This merger made it the largest parking operator in North America. In 2025, Metropolis Technologies acquired Oosto (previously named AnyVision), which develops biometric technologies used in data centers, healthcare, and consumer products.

In June 2025, Lookman Olusanya became chief financial officer. He had previously been CFO of Square, and held financial roles at Google Cloud and Amazon Web Services. At the time, the company was reportedly approaching a $5 billion valuation.

As of 2025, the company processes approximately $5 billion in payments from 20 million customers annually, representing almost 10% of licensed drivers in the United States. That year, it raised $1.6 billion in Series D funding led by Aryeh Bourkoff’s LionTree to expand its computer vision platform into new industries, including quick-service restaurants, fueling, hospitality and retail. The company's platform uses artificial intelligence and computer vision technology to recognize users and enable contactless transactions without the need for traditional digital payments, apps or credit cards.

The company operates checkout-free parking, baggage and mobility services at over 75 airports throughout the United States.

In 2026, the company reached an $8.75 million settlement with the Tennessee Attorney General regarding its signage and parking violation policies. Under the terms of the settlement, Metropolis provided $2.25M in free parking credits to Tennessee residents.

The company was included in CNBC's Disruptor 50 list in 2025 and 2026. It was included on the 2026 TIME 100 lists of Most Influential Companies and Companies: Industry Leaders.

The L.A Business Magazine has described Metropolis as being part of the "recognition economy", a term that describes artificial intelligence infrastructure that can handle transactions based on contactless identity verification.
