= Aaron Skonnard =

American businessperson

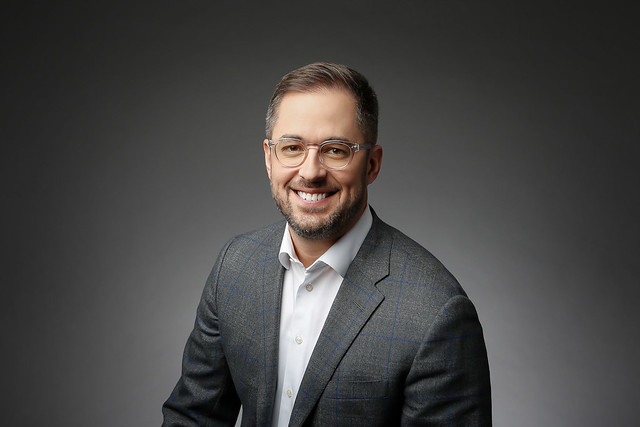
- Education: Brigham Young University (B.S.)
- Occupations: Investor, entrepreneur, author
- Known for: CEO of Pluralsight

Aaron Skonnard is an American businessman and author. He is the co-founder and former CEO of Pluralsight, an online technology skills and training platform he launched in 2004 with Keith Brown, Fritz Onion, and Bill Williams. Under his leadership Pluralsight grew from a technical training company to a global digital learning company. It went public in 2018 and was later acquired by Vista Equity Partners. Skonnard retired as CEO in 2024 and continues to serve on the Pluralsight One advisory Board.

== Early life ==
Skonnard began learning to code as a child, when his father brought home an Apple II computer. He graduated from Brigham Young University in 1996 with a degree in Computer science. After college, prior to founding Pluralsight, he worked at 3M, Intel, and Axiom Technologies.

== Career ==
=== Pluralsight ===
Skonnard co-founded Pluralsight in 2004 with Keith Brown, Fritz Onion, and Bill Williams. The company is based in America with additional offices in Ireland, Australia, and India.

Initially, Pluralsight focused on classroom training courses for businesses. Skonnard and his partners traveled globally to hold weeklong, in-person classes. In 2007, its business model shifted to focus exclusively on online video training. As the company grew, they expanded into enterprise subscriptions.

Beginning in 2012, the company raised over $190 million in venture funding, completing a Series A in 2012–2013, and a Series B in 2014. Following the Series B, Skonnard announced the company's valuation neared $1 billion, up from less than $100 million in 2012.From 2013 to 2017, Pluralsight was listed on the Inc. 5000 ranking of private companies.

In 2017, the company held its first Pluralsight Live customer conference. The conference has featured celebrities such as Michelle Obama, Malala Yousafzai, Ellen DeGeneres, Tony Hawk, Lin-Manuel Miranda, Angela Duckworth, and Trevor Noah over the years.

A year later, Pluralsight expanded into Europe, opening a Headquarters in Dublin, Ireland. At the time, the company had grown from its initial online offering of 10 courses to offering around 7,000. That same year, Pluralsight became a publicly traded company listing on the NASDAQ. Shares opened at $15, and closed the first day of trading at $20, giving the company a market cap of over $2.5 billion. By 2019, Pluralsight reported that roughly 70% of Fortune 500 companies used its products.

In April 2020, in response to the COVID-19 pandemic, Skonnard announced that Pluralsight would make its full library of online technology courses available to learners for the entire month to encourage skill development during lockdowns. The company reported that over 100,000 people signed up in the first 24 hours after the announcement.

In 2021 Vista Equity Partners purchased Pluralsight for $3.8 billion and merged it with A Cloud Guru.Three years later, Vista handed over control to a group of private lenders.

Skonnard stepped down as CEO of Pluralsight in April 2024, after leading the company for approximately 20 years. He continues to serve as a special advisor on the Pluralsight One Advisory Board.

==== Pluralsight One ====
In 2017, Pluralsight launched Pluralsight One, a social initiative. Through it, the company donates 1% of its equity, product, time, and profit to nonprofit partners aligned with Pluralsight's tech education mission. Skonnard and Fritz Onion also committed to donating from their personal shares, for an amount equal to 1% of the company's outstanding shares.

Some of the nonprofit partners that have received Pluralsight One grants include AnnieCannons, CodePath, Girls Who Code, Auticon Training Institute, Empowr Co., I.C., Stars, Junior Achievement Utah, LaunchCode, LGBT Tech, NPower, Tech-Moms, Unlocked Labs, and Year Up.

Pluralsight has partnerships with various organizations, including Code.org, The Computer Science Teachers Association (CSTA), The Norwegian Refugee Council (NRC), The Malala Fund, and Year Up.

==== Acquisitions ====
During Skonnard's tenure as CEO, Pluralsight acquired several companies including PeepCode, TrainSignal, TekPub, Digital-Tutors, Smarterer, Code School, HackHands, Train Simple, GitPrime, DevelopIntelligence, Next Tech, and A Cloud Guru.

==== Recognition ====
Skonnard has received several awards for entrepreneurship and leadership. In 2013, he received an Ernst & Young Entrepreneur of the Year Award. In 2016, he was recognized as one of Utah Business's CEO of the Year honorees and named Entrepreneur of the Year by MountainWest Capital Network. That same year, Skonnard was awarded Utah CEO of the Year at the inaugural Utah Startup Awards. In 2017, he was inducted into the Utah Technology Council Hall of Fame.

=== Silicon Slopes ===
In November 2015, Skonnard helped launch the Start Foundation, a 501(c)(3) organization hoping to improve Utah's tech industry. At launch, Skonnard was named the foundation's chairman.

In December 2016, the Start Foundation was replaced by a newly formed nonprofit started by Silicon Slopes and Beehive Startups. Skonnard served on the board of Silicon Slopes, which focuses increasing diversity and providing resources for startups and entrepreneurs in Utah.

In 2019, Skonnard helped launch the Silicon Slopes Computer Science fund and donated $1 million to help support efforts to get computer science in every school in Utah. Skonnard and entrepreneurs challenged Utah legislators to respond in kind, which led to the passage and funding of HB227.

=== Investments ===
Skonnard has invested in a number of companies including:

- After.com
- Artifact
- Bevy
- Chatbooks
- Cotopaxi
- Divvy
- Donde
- Grow
- Jump
- Kadence
- Leland
- Mindsmith
- Monarx
- Numetric
- Pmtbox
- Recursion Pharmaceuticals
- Skill Struck
- SponsorCX
- Taft
- Zencastr
- Zonos

=== Publications ===
==== Books ====
Skonnard is the author or co-author of three books: Essential WinInet, Essential XML: Beyond Markup, and Essential XML Quick Reference.

==== Magazine Articles ====
Skonnard has been published in technical and business magazines. This includes MSDN Magazine which was originally two separate journals: Microsoft Systems Journal and Microsoft Internet Developer as well as Inc Magazine, Entrepreneur, and Forbes.

=== Boards ===
As of 2025, Skonnard serves on the following boards:

- Pluralsight One Advisory Board
- Zions Bancorporation
- Utah Board of Higher Education
- Olympics Utah 2034 – Impact & Legacy Committee
- Nucleus Institute
- Kadence
- Mindsmith
- Strider

== Personal life ==
He lives in Utah with his wife, Monica, and their five children.
