= Courtney Fukuda =

American businessperson

- Fukuda in 2024
- Education: Yale University
- Known for: Cofounder of Metropolis Technologies
- Title: Chief integration officer of Metropolis Technologies

Courtney Fukuda is an American businessperson known for co-founding Metropolis Technologies.

== Early life and education ==
Courtney Fukuda is from Hawaii. She attended Punahou School in Honolulu, and graduated from Yale University with a Bachelor of Arts degree in economics in 2012. Fukuda competed in gymnastics on the collegiate level with the Yale Bulldogs.

== Career ==
Fukuda completed an internship at BlackRock Alternative Advisors in 2011, and was hired as a product strategist in 2012. She became Regional Head of Asia Pacific Product Strategy at BlackRock, in charge of business strategy in Greater China, South Korea, and Southeast Asia. While at BlackRock, she worked with Travis Kell, who was one of her fellow co-founders at Metropolis Technologies.

=== Metropolis Technologies ===
In 2017, Fukuda cofounded Metropolis Technologies with Alex Israel, Travis Kell, and Peter Fisher in Los Angeles. It is an artificial intelligence platform built around computer vision and machine learning that processes contactless transactions. Fukuda currently serves as chief integration officer at Metropolis Technologies.

She was included in the 2025 Inc. magazine "Female Founders" list for leading Metropolis' $1.6 billion acquisition of SP Plus Corporation. The acquisition made Metropolis Technologies the largest parking operator in North America. In 2026, Metropolis Technologies was included on Time Magazine's TIME 100 Most Influential Companies and TIME 100 Companies: Industry Leaders lists.

Fukuda was a speaker at the 2026 Web Summit conference.
