= Reshma Kewalramani =

Pharmaceutical Executive

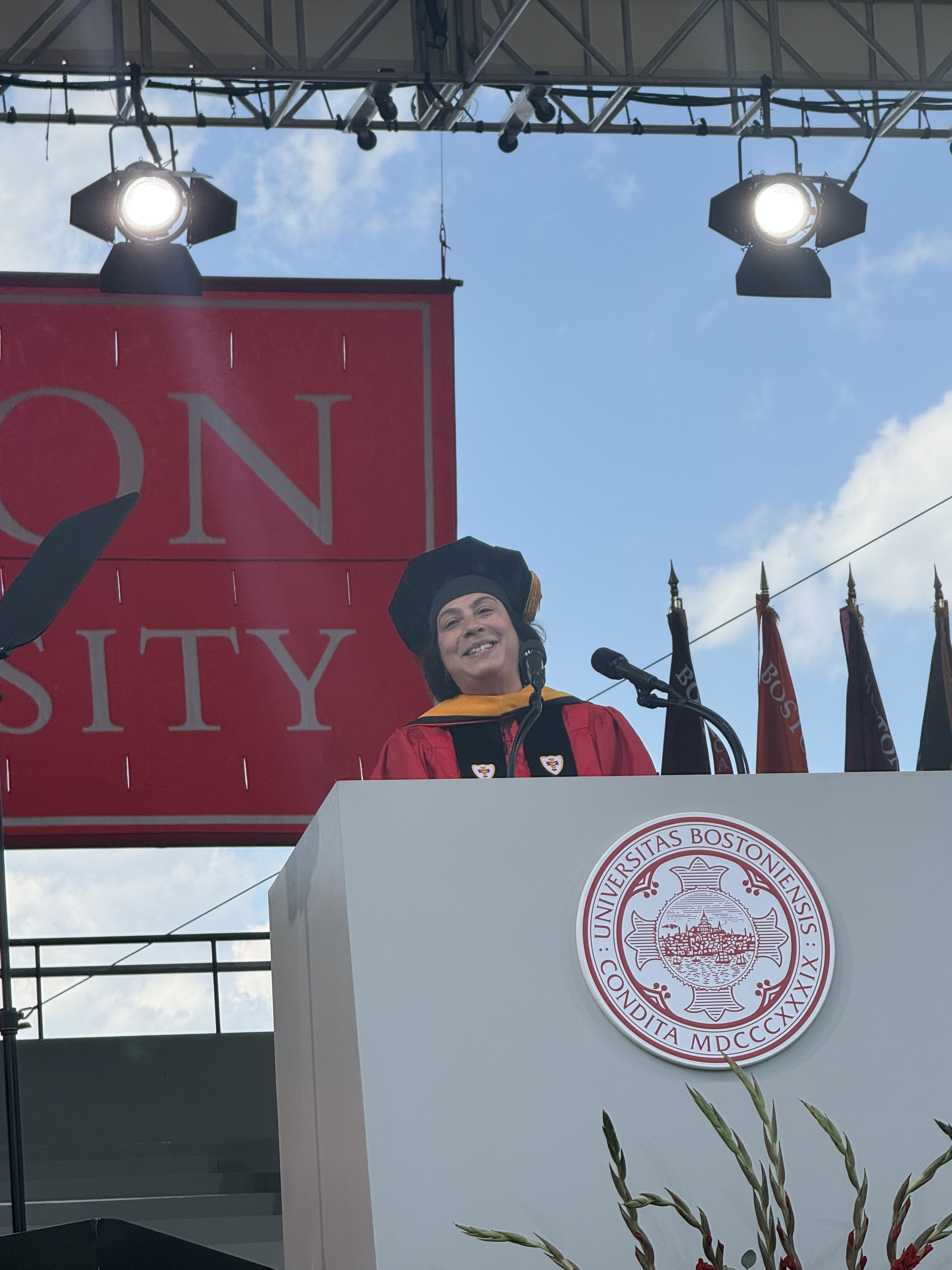
- Kewalramani in 2026
- Born: Bombay, India
- Education: Boston University, B.A./M.D. (1998); Harvard General Management Program (2015)
- Occupations: CEO and president of Vertex Pharmaceuticals
- Years active: 1998–present
- Known for: First female CEO of a large US biotech company.
- Board member of: Massachusetts General Hospital; Boston University School of Medicine; Biomedical Science Careers Program; Kidney Health Initiative
- Awards: Harvard Medical School Excellence in Teaching Award; International Institute of New England Golden Door Award; New England Council New Englander of the Year; Fortune Most Powerful Women List
- Website: Reshma Kewalramani

Reshma Kewalramani, is the president and chief executive officer of Vertex Pharmaceuticals, a biotechnology company based in Boston, Massachusetts, as of April 1, 2020. She is the first female CEO of a large US biotech company. She was previously the chief medical officer and vice president of global medicines development and medical affairs at Vertex.

== Early life and education ==
Kewalramani was born in Bombay, India to a Sindhi Hindu family. She and her family immigrated to the US when she was 11 years old.

She graduated in 1998 from the seven-year liberal arts/medical education program at Boston University, Phi Beta Kappa, Summa Cum Laude. She finished her internship and residency at the Massachusetts General Hospital and her fellowship in nephrology at the Massachusetts General Hospital and Brigham and Women's Hospital combined program. After finishing her fellowship in clinical nephrology she did research in transplantation. She graduated from the General Management Program at Harvard Business School in 2015.

== Career ==
Kewalramani began her career as a physician at Massachusetts General Hospital and Brigham and Women's Hospital. She was also a physician at the Massachusetts Eye and Ear Infirmary and the Massachusetts Institute of Technology. She then entered the biopharma sector, working for Amgen for over 12 years, where she held leadership positions in research and development. In 2017 she joined Vertex Pharmaceuticals, and in 2018 became Chief Medical Officer. She assumed the role of president and CEO on April 1, 2020 and is a member of the Vertex Board of Directors.

Since Kewalramani became CEO, Vertex has continued to develop and gain regulatory approvals for its cystic fibrosis therapies, including Trikafta and Alyftrek. Under her tenure, and in collaboration with CRISPR Therapeutics, Vertex developed Casgevy, a CRISPR-based gene-editing therapy for sickle cell disease and beta thalassemia, which received regulatory approval in December 2023; and has advanced investigational cell therapies for type 1 diabetes. The company is also conducting clinical trials for a treatment for APOL1-mediated kidney disease (AMKD), among other programs. In 2025, the FDA approved Journavx (suzetrigine) for moderate-to-severe acute pain, marking the first approval of a new class of pain medication in over two decades.

=== Boards and awards ===
Kewalramani is a member of the Massachusetts General Hospital Board of Trustees, the Biomedical Science Careers Program Board, and the Boston University School of Medicine Dean's Advisory Board. She was also a member of the board of directors of Ginkgo Bioworks, the National Board of Directors for Year Up, and was on the inaugural board of directors of the Kidney Health Initiative.

She is the recipient of the American College of Physicians Associates Council Award, the American Medical Women's Association Janet M. Glasgow Memorial Achievement Citation, and the Harvard Medical School Excellence in Teaching Award. Kewalramani is also a Fellow of the American Society of Nephrology and received board certification in Internal Medicine in 2001 and in Nephrology in 2003. In 2019, she received the TiE Boston Healthcare Leadership Award, and was named one of Boston Business Journal's Power 50. In 2020, Kewalramani was named to the inaugural Business Leaders List by Indiaspora, Business Insider’s list of 10 people transforming health care, the PharmaVOICE 100 list of leaders in the life sciences, and Boston Business Journal’s list of Women Who Mean Business. In 2021, she was the recipient of the International Institute of New England’s Golden Door Award and was named a New Englander of the Year by the New England Council. In 2023, she was a recipient of the Hope Visionary award at the 26th annual Biomedical Science Careers Program Evening of Hope benefit in recognition of her passion and commitment to the BSCP students and its mission to help minorities and underrepresented individuals achieve their educational and professional goals in STEM fields. Under her leadership as CEO, Vertex was ranked #2 on The Commonwealth Institute’s Top Women-Led Businesses in Massachusetts in 2021. She was named on Fortune's list of Most Powerful Women in 2023.

In 2025, Time magazine included Kewalramani on its list of "100 Most Influential People." She is the only Indian to have made the list. She was also named to the Time 100 Health list that year.

== Personal life ==
Kewalramani lives in Massachusetts, and has twin sons.
