= Npower =

Npower may refer to:

- N-Power (Nigeria), Nigerian Federal Government programme to empower youth.
- npower (United Kingdom), a gas and electricity supply company in the UK
- NPower (USA), a network of nonprofit technology assistance providers in the United States
- Npower, a line of electronics from Nickelodeon which includes music/media players, digital cameras and DVD players
- NPOWER, Nielsen's audience insights platform
