= Jupiter Broadcasting =

American podcasting network

- Type: Podcast network
- Industry: Technology
- Genre: Science, Technology, News
- Founded: 2008
- Founder: Chris Fisher, Bryan Lunduke
- Headquarters: Seattle, Washington, U.S.
- Area served: Worldwide
- Key people: Chris Fisher, Wes Payne
- Products: Audio podcasts
- Website: jupiterbroadcasting.com

Jupiter Broadcasting is a podcasting network formed by Chris Fisher and Bryan Lunduke in May 2008 following the initial success of The Linux Action Show!

== History ==
In 2008, the company had two shows The Linux Action Show! and CastaBlasta.

By 2017, they were producing nine video and audio podcasts.

In September of 2018, Jupiter Broadcasting announced their merger with Linux Academy, a Linux and cloud training platform.

In December of 2019, Linux Academy was acquired by A Cloud Guru.

In August 2020, on Linux Unplugged 368, Chris Fisher announced Jupiter Broadcasting would be independent again, and 2 shows, Coder Radio and Linux Action News, would resume. Linux Headlines would stay with A Cloud Guru.

== Broadcasts ==
=== Current ===
- LINUX Unplugged – a spin-off of The Linux Action Show! where the hosts Chris Fisher and Wes Payne (formerly Chris Fisher and Matt Hartley) together with an open Mumble room discusses topics around Linux and its community topics

=== Former ===
- Ask Noah – a community oriented Q&A show featuring live callers run by Noah Chelliah. In September 2019, Ask Noah became a part of the Destination Linux Network.
- Beer is Tasty – a show which reviewed various beers
- BSD Now – an all-encompassing BSD podcast covering a range of topics on a variety of BSDs. It is hosted by Allan Jude and Benedict Reuschling. Previous host Kris Moore left in episode 185. Beginning at episode 349, BSD Now became independent of Jupiter Broadcasting. This was announced on episode 347.
- CastaBlasta – a podcast that was hosted by Chris Fisher, Jeremy Randall, Bryan Lunduke, and John. It covered TV shows and movies. Originally an audio-only podcast, it migrated over to video before being put on an indefinite hiatus.
- Choose Linux – A show about discovering Linux. Previously hosted by Joe Ressington, Drew DeVore, Ell Marquez and Jason Evangelho of Forbes, who left in episode 11. On April 9, 2020, this show wase retired due to Ressington's termination from A Cloud Guru.
- Coder Radio – a talk show which advises listeners on business and software development. It is hosted by Michael Dominick and Chris Fisher.
- FauxShow – branded as "not a real show, but a social experience". Last broadcast to date was in February 2016. It was hosted by Chris and Angela Fisher.
- HowTo Linux – a show focusing on Linux tutorials geared toward new and experienced Linux users. It was hosted by Chris Fisher and Chase Nunes.
- In-Depth Look – a show that went in-depth on various technology topics
- Tech Talk Today – a daily commentary show focusing on tech news and Internet culture. It was hosted by Chris and Angela Fisher.
- Joint Failures – a general entertainment show
- Jupiter@Nite – a loose talk show-style show, its theme was based on current events with an emphasis on science and technology
- Legend of The Stoned Owl (LOTSO) – a show that focused on video games news and reviews
- Linux Action News – Weekly Linux news and analysis by Chris Fisher and Wes Payne.
- Linux Action Show – a technology show with a focus on Linux, the open source community and the free-software community. Hosted by Chris Fisher (2006–2017), Noah Chelliah (February 1, 2015 – 2017), Matt Hartley (from July 29, 2012 – January 25, 2015), Allan Jude (September 4, 2011 – December 18, 2011) and Bryan Lunduke (2006 – July 15, 2012, excluding 2011).
- MMOrgue – focused specifically on massively multiplayer online games
- Plan B – an audio show that discussed news relating to Bitcoin and other crypto-currencies
- Rover Log – Fisher's personal vlog
- SciByte – an audio-only science news hosted by Chris Fisher and Heather Rose
- Self-Hosted – Hosted by Chris Fisher and Alex Kretzschmar. The show covers self-hosting network services and digital software.
- STOked – focused on Star Trek Online
- TechSNAP – a show about systems administration. It was hosted by Wes Payne and Jim Salter (previously Allan Jude and Chris Fisher) until Payne left A Cloud Guru to return to software development full-time.
- The Friday Stream – a casual show where the crew shared stories and give each other a hard time
- TORked – Focused on Star Wars: The Old Republic
- Unfilter – a news show that reported stories not often covered by major networks. It was hosted by Chase Nunes and Chris Fisher. While no longer a part of Jupiter Broadcasting, on March 18, 2020, Unfilter was brought back with only Chris Fisher.
- User Error – a show hosted by Alan Pope, Joe Ressington and Daniel Fore. Previously hosted by Chris Fisher, Noah Chelliah, and "The Beard". While no longer part of the Jupiter Broadcasting network, on April 21, 2020, Joe Resington (with the other 2 current hosts) brought a similar show back called "The New Show".
- Women's Tech Radio – Interviews with women in technology-related fields. It was hosted by Angela Fisher and Paige Hubbell.

=== Transmission technology ===
Most shows are streamed live through various platforms, such as their own website, Twitch, YouTube, and other audio-only formats. When not live, past episodes are available for streaming and download.

Jupiter Broadcasting also uses social media, like an IRC channel for live chat, Mumble for Linux UNPLUGGED, Telegram, and most current shows have their own Twitter account. Viewer interaction is encouraged during live streams.

As of early 2017, all shows from the main JB1 studio are being streamed using Linux and open source technologies. All remaining proprietary software had been removed and replaced by free alternatives which, according to Fisher, does not present any type of downgrade to the content's quality.

== Awards ==
- The Linux Action Show came fourth after Richard Stallman in the Linux Journal for Best Linux/OSS Advocate/Evangelist for 2013.
- Ask Noah, Linux Unplugged, and TechSNAP made it in the top 50 of VertitechIT's Best IT Podcasts: 50 Informative (and Entertaining) Shows for IT Pros. Ask Noah came in #3, Linux Unplugged #20, and TechSNAP #38.

== Sponsorships ==
Jupiter Broadcasting has been an annual media sponsor for LinuxFest Northwest since 2008.
