= Pluralsight =

Online education company

Pluralsight, LLC
- Type: Private
- Industry: E-learning
- Founded: 2004
- Founder: Aaron Skonnard; Keith Brown; Fritz Onion; Bill Williams
- Headquarters: Westlake, Texas, US
- Key people: Erin Gajdalo (CEO)
- Products: Technology learning platform
- Services: Online education
- Revenue: ▲$500.2 million (2019)
- Owner: Blue Owl Capital; Ares Management
- Number of employees: 2,000 (2025)
- Website: www.pluralsight.com

Pluralsight, LLC is an American privately held online education company that offers a variety of video training courses for software developers, IT administrators, and creative professionals through its website. Founded in 2004 by Aaron Skonnard, Keith Brown, Fritz Onion, and Bill Williams, the company has its headquarters in Westlake, Texas. As of July 2018, it uses more than 1,400 subject-matter experts as authors, and offers more than 7,000 courses in its catalog. Since first moving its courses online in 2007, the company has expanded, developing a full enterprise platform, and adding skills assessment modules.

== History ==
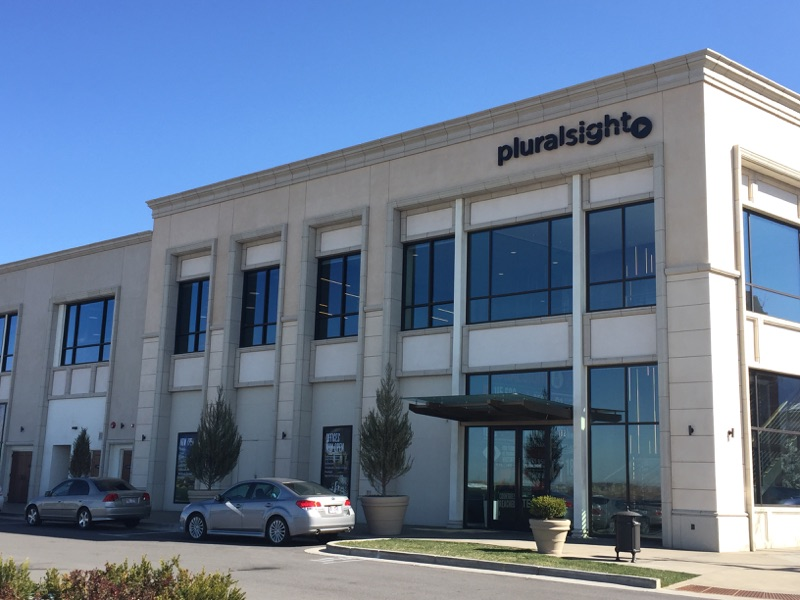
Former Pluralsight headquarters in Farmington, Utah

Pluralsight was founded in 2004 as a classroom training company that involved sending an instructor to a business or training event. When Pluralsight first started, its four founders each contributed $5,000. For the first nine years, the company and its founders received no outside funding. By 2007, the company shifted its emphasis to online video training.

In December 2012, the company raised $27.5 million in Series A funding from Insight Venture Partners. On March 18, 2014, it received an additional $2.5 million in Series A Funding. On August 27, 2014, it received $135 million in Series B funding from Insight Venture Partners, ICONIQ Capital, and Sorenson Capital—reported at the time to be the largest venture funding round ever received by a Utah company. Co-founder and CEO Aaron Skonnard stated that after this round of funding, the company's estimated total valuation had increased from less than $100 million in 2012 to nearly $1 billion.

In December 2016, the company raised an additional $30 million in a Series C round that valued the company over $1 billion. The round included funding from existing investors Insight Venture Partners and Iconiq Capital.

In April 2018, Pluralsight filed for an initial public offering. On May 17, 2018, the company opened on the NASDAQ exchange at a $15 share price, and closed its first day of trading at $20.

The company raised $456 million from investors with a secondary public offering in March 2019.

In 2020, Pluralsight had 18,000 corporate clients which includes 70% of Fortune 500 companies.

In December 2020, Pluralsight announced it would be acquired by private equity firm Vista Equity Partners for $3.5 billion. Regulatory approval was expected in the first half of 2021, and Pluralsight would no longer be publicly traded.

In April 2021, Vista Equity Partners successfully completed its acquisition of Pluralsight for $22.50 per share.

In April 2024, co-founder Aaron Skonnard was succeeded as chief executive officer by Chris Walters.

In May 2024, Vista Equity Partners announced they had written off the entire value of Pluralsight. That July, the company announced that it would move its headquarters from Draper, Utah to Westlake, a Dallas suburb in North Texas, and reduce its workforce by 17%. In August, lenders, led by Blue Owl and Ares Management, took full ownership of Pluralsight, erasing Vista Equity Partners' shareholdings.

In February 2025, Pluralsight settled a class-action lawsuit for $20 million in the U.S. District Court for the District of Utah that was originally filed by a group of public employee retirement funds investors in the U.S. District Court for the Southern District of New York in August 2019, then transferred to Utah.

== Business model ==
Through a subscription business model, Pluralsight provides online professional tech training to individual and business customers. The company pays its course authors a royalty, based on how often their videos are viewed. In 2013, author Scott Allen became the first of its authors to earn over $1 million in royalties from his courses.

The company also offers a complete SaaS platform for its enterprise users.

Pluralsight was reportedly working with roughly 40% of Fortune 500 companies in 2017 and with 70% by 2019. That year, business-to-business sales accounted for 86% of the company's billings.

In 2017, the company announced its participation in the Pledge 1% movement—a global initiative to encourage corporate philanthropy by asking companies to commit 1% of their efforts towards nonprofit organizations. The company launched Pluralsight One in September 2017, with the goal of improving technology education in the nonprofit sector.

== Acquisitions ==
Starting in 2013, Pluralsight expanded through a series of acquisitions. On July 24, 2013, it acquired PeepCode, a provider of open source training to developers, for an undisclosed amount. This added about 100 new courses in the Open Source category to Pluralsight's course catalog, expanding it beyond its traditional realm of offerings focused mainly on developers who worked on Microsoft technologies. On August 5, it acquired Chicago-based TrainSignal, a company providing training for Information technology personnel, for $23.6 million. It absorbed 35 TrainSignal employees, and maintained its office in Chicago as a satellite. On October 31, Pluralsight acquired Tekpub, producer of a series of screencasts on new development technologies, for an undisclosed amount. Co-founder Rob Conery joined Pluralsight, and continues to produce training videos under its brand. Other authors from Tekpub, including Jon Skeet and Scott Hanselman, also became Pluralsight authors.

On April 9, 2014, Pluralsight announced it acquired Digital-Tutors, a company providing training for creative professionals, for $45 million. This acquisition expanded the company's training catalog to more than 3000 titles, broadening its topic coverage to media and design. Approximately 30 employees from Digital-Tutors joined Pluralsight. Pluralsight maintained the former Digital-Tutors headquarters in Oklahoma City as a satellite office. On November 19, Pluralsight announced it had acquired Smarterer, an online skills assessment platform, for $75 million. Based in Boston, Smarterer was founded in 2010 and was backed by Google Ventures, among others. Smarterer founder and CEO Dave Balter stated that his entire 18-person staff would remain with the company.

On January 26, 2015, Pluralsight announced its acquisition of Orlando-based Code School, an online training site offering video courses and exercise-based lessons related to entry-level and intermediate coding and programming. It was reported that the acquisition was for $36 million. Code School's office, and its team of 39 full-time employees, remain open in Orlando. On July 9, Pluralsight announced its acquisition of HackHands for an undisclosed amount. Founded in 2013, San Francisco-based HackHands provides on-demand live assistance for technology learners via video and audio chat, instant messaging, and screen sharing. The HackHands acquisition marked Pluralsight's seventh deal in two years.

On July 19, 2016, Pluralsight announced it had acquired Train Simple, a video training company with a focus on Adobe software.

On May 1, 2019, Pluralsight announced its acquisition of GitPrime, a developer team productivity tool, for $170 million in cash.

On October 14, 2020, Pluralsight acquired DevelopIntelligence. This acquisition added the ability to deliver Instructor-led training.

On January 12, 2021, Pluralsight announced the acquisition of Next Tech, a San Diego, California provider of cloud-based computing environments, enabling the authoring and hosting of labs in software development, data science, and machine learning for an undisclosed amount.

On June 2, 2021, Pluralsight announced the acquisition of A Cloud Guru, an Austin, Texas provider of an interactive, online learning platform designed to help IT professionals re-skill in cloud technology. The transaction was closed on July 8, 2021.

== Partnerships and community involvement ==
In October 2012, Microsoft and Pluralsight announced a partnership making Pluralsight courses available to MSDN subscribers and through its DreamSpark, BizSpark, WebsiteSpark, and Engineer Excellence programs. The customized "Pluralsight Starter Subscription" consisted of several Visual Studio 2012 courses. In November 2014, the two companies partnered again, giving MSDN subscribers a 12-month access to a selection of Pluralsight's courses.

In May 2013, Pluralsight launched a free programming coding bootcamp for kids ages 10 and up to help teach coding in school.

In 2014, Pluralsight partnered with the state of Utah's Office of Economic Development to offer Utah K–12 teachers a free one-year subscription to their training library. Utah Governor Gary Herbert valued the donation between $5 million and $10 million.

Pluralsight also partnered with LaunchCode in November 2014 to help candidates secure jobs in technology by offering one year of free access to the Pluralsight course library. In December 2014, the company supported the "Hour of Code" movement by hosting an hour of code for a week. More than 200 students across the state participated.

In 2017, Pluralsight announced partnerships with Microsoft, Adobe, and Oracle, to expand their offerings and course availability.

In September 2017, during a panel discussion with Ivanka Trump about increasing access to STEM-related programs in public schools, Pluralsight pledged $10 million as part of a private-sector contribution reaching over $300 million. Other participants include Amazon, Google, General Motors, and Facebook.

In 2017, Google announced, in association with Pluralsight, 100,000 scholarships to help developers gain access to advanced learning curriculum in emerging technologies, including mobile and web development, machine learning, artificial intelligence, and cloud platforms in India.

In 2020, Pluralsight partnered with Google and Andela for a developer skills program available to all countries in Africa. The program, Google Africa Developer Scholarship, offers all participants free access to Pluralsight's training courses.

== See also ==
- EdX
- FutureLearn
- Khan Academy
- LinkedIn Learning
- Coursera
- Udemy
- Udacity
