= Crinetics Pharmaceuticals =

American pharmaceutical company

Crinetics Pharmaceuticals, Inc.
- Type: Subsidiary
- ISIN: US22663K1079
- Industry: Pharmaceuticals, Medical technology
- Founded: 2008
- Defunct: 2026
- Fate: Merged with Vertex Pharmaceuticals
- Headquarters: San Diego, California, United States
- Key people: Scott Struthers (co-founder); Stephen F. Betz (co-founder)
- Revenue: US$9.4 million (2024)
- Operating income: US$−94.74 million (2024)
- Net income: US$−80.6 million (2024)
- Total assets: US$1.4 billion (2024)
- Total equity: US$1.3 billion (2024)
- Number of employees: 437 (2024)
- Parent: Vertex Pharmaceuticals Inc.
- Website: crinetics.com

Crinetics Pharmaceuticals was a global pharmaceutical company known for developing drugs for the treatment of endocrine-related diseases. It was founded by Scott Struthers, Frank Zhu, Ana Kusnetzow, and Stephen F. Betz in 2008 and is headquartered in San Diego, California. It went public on NASDAQ in 2018.

In July 2026, Vertex Pharmaceuticals agreed to acquire the company for $10 billion. The acquisition closed in September of 2026.

== History ==
Struthers, Zhu, Kusnetzow, and Betz founded Crinetics in 2008 after previously working together on a small molecule drug for the treatment of endometriosis at Neurocrine Biosciences.

Crinetics expanded into a larger laboratory in 2010. After receiving NIH grant funding, Crinetics moved into its second laboratory.

In 2011, Crinetics Pharmaceuticals competed for the Michelson Prize, a competition sponsored by the Found Animals Foundation to develop a low-cost, non-surgical method for sterilizing dogs and cats, which would later lead to the licensing of a molecule for the treatment of acromegaly in large breed dogs.

Crinetics first synthesized its lead drug candidate to treat acromegaly. The drug was named paltusotine, in 2016. Crinetics Pharmaceuticals went public with an IPO in 2018. It conducted Phase II trials for paltusotine from 2019 to 2020. It conducted Phase III trials for paltusotine from 2021 to 2024. After the drug succeeded in a second Phase III study, the FDA accepted the company's new drug application for paltusotine and the company announced it was planning for a 2025 launch for the drug. The FDA set a Prescription Drug User Fee Act for the drug on September 25, 2025.

In 2021, Crinetics, together with 5AM Ventures and Frazier Healthcare Partners, formed an independently operated new company, Radionetics Oncology, aimed to develop a deep pipeline of novel, targeted, nonpeptide radiopharmaceuticals for the treatment of a broad range of oncology indications.

Crinetics partnered with the veterinary medicine company Loyal to develop a pill to extend the lifespans of large dogs in 2023.

In 2024, Scott Struthers received the Ernst & Young Entrepreneur of the Year Award for his work with Crinetics. In 2024, Crinetics was reported to have patent activity in rare diseases, health technology, and addiction therapies.

In 2024, Radionetics formed a strategic relationship with Eli Lilly and Company to take forward Radionetics’ proprietary GPCR targeting small molecule radiopharmaceuticals. Under the terms of the agreement, Radionetics received a $140 million upfront cash payment. As part of the strategic agreement, Lilly obtained the exclusive right to acquire Radionetics upon conclusion of an exercise period for $1 billion.

Crinetics also established its first office outside the United States in Zug, Switzerland in 2024.

In 2025, Crinetics Pharmaceuticals plans to file an Investigational New Drug for an oral thyroid stimulating hormone receptor antagonist and its nonpeptide drug conjugate (CRN09682). A total of four development candidates are currently in IND-enabling studies, including a PTH antagonist (Hyperparathyrodism), non-peptide drug conjugate (NETs and SST2-expressing solid tumors), TSH antagonist (Graves’ disease & TED) and SST3 agonist (ADPKD).

In July 2026, Vertex Pharmaceuticals agreed to acquire Crinetics for $10 billion.

== Treatments ==
Crinetics’ pipeline focuses on synthesizing novel molecules for rare endocrine diseases. It is most known for developing paltusotine, a drug designed to treat the hormonal disorder acromegaly. Paltusotine works by helping moderate elevated IGF-1 levels, which is the main symptom of acromegaly. Paltusotine has also been tested as a treatment for carcinoid syndrome.

Crinetics has also developed oral treatments for neuroendocrine tumors, hyperinsulism, and Cushing's disease. The company's drug for treating Cushing's disease, Atumeltnant (also known as CRN049894), works by reducing levels of ACTH.

The company's pipeline also includes an oral parathyroid hormone inhibitor program for hyperparathyroidism and treatments for thyroid eye disease, Graves' disease, and obesity. Additionally, Crinetics nonpeptide drug conjugates (NDCs) include CRN09682, which is a somatostatin receptor 2 (SST2) targeted drug. NDCs are a new technology developed in-house by Crinetics.
