= Growth buyout =

Type of business acquisition

A growth buyout (GBO) is an acquisition intended to allow an investor or holding company to capitalize on the market growth of a maturing portfolio company. Unlike growth equity, which typically involves minority ownership, a growth buyout usually involves acquiring a large or controlling stake. Because growth buyouts are typically financed with less debt than conventional leveraged buyouts, their returns depend more heavily on growth in the portfolio company's earnings than on leverage. The model has been pursued by American and European private equity firms since the 1980s and is associated particularly with investment in technology and healthcare companies.

== Characteristics ==
Growth buyouts often target profitable portfolio companies in industries with a high potential for growth. These acquisitions are financed through a combination of debt and equity. Cambridge Associates defines growth buyouts as being a highly growth oriented form of private equity strategy, in contrast to more leverage-oriented strategies like leveraged buyouts (LBO). The holding company in growth buyout transactions seeks to create revenue growth in the portfolio company by expanding market share. This model has also been called "buy and build". Typically this market growth is achieved through strategies like such as acquisitions and the expansion of product lines and distribution.

During a growth buyout, the holding company often acquires a large stake or even a controlling interest in the portfolio company. This focus on management and control differentiates growth buyouts from growth equity, which typically involves minority ownership. These buyouts carry a certain amount of risk, as they rely upon the expectation of continued growth in the portfolio company. In order to be successful, they require operational expertise and the ability to structure financing and acquisitions.

== History ==
The growth buyout model is often pursued by American and European private equity firms. Growth buyouts have been observed to correlate with increased employment and employee commitment, due to an increased focus on human resource management intended to drive growth.

Private equity firm TA Associates originally pursued a mixture of early stage and high-growth investments in the 1960s, before shifting to focus exclusively on growth buyouts in the 1980s. Thomas H. Lee Partners acquired Hills Department Store through a growth buyout in 1985, after which the company's sales, operating profit and number of employees grew significantly. The firm acquired J. Baker, Inc. through a growth buyout that same year, increasing its number of stores and licensed sales.

Frazier Healthcare Partners created a dedicated growth buyout fund in 2024 with the goal of acquiring middle-market healthcare companies. The joint venture Accel-KKR has historically pursued growth buyout strategies, especially those focused on technology and software companies such as Energy Services Group, healthcare technology company VisiQuate, fraud prevention and transaction management platform Accertify, and vehicle-to-government technology company Vitu. Technology industry company Metropolis Technologies is also known for adopting a growth buyout model, such as its acquisition of the publicly traded company SP Plus Corporation which was taken private by Metropolis in 2024. Other firms associated with growth buyouts include General Atlantic, which launched its eighth growth fund in 2024, with an $8 billion goal. Insight Partners closed $12.5 billion across three vehicles in January 2025, including a dedicated growth buyout fund.

== Value creation and returns ==
Empirical studies of buyout investments generally attribute the change in an investment's value to three sources: growth in the portfolio company's earnings, commonly measured as EBITDA; a change in the valuation multiple applied to those earnings between entry and exit, known as multiple expansion; and the effect of leverage, including the repayment of acquisition debt from operating cash flow. Because growth buyouts are financed with less debt than conventional leveraged buyouts, a larger share of the return must be generated by earnings growth rather than by deleveraging or financial structuring.

Research on operating performance following buyouts has produced mixed results across time periods. Steven Kaplan, examining 76 management buyouts completed between 1980 and 1986, found that operating income and net cash flow rose substantially relative to industry benchmarks in the three years after the transaction. Acharya, Gottschalg, Hahn and Kehoe, studying large buyouts of Western European companies, reported positive abnormal returns after controlling for leverage and sector performance, which they attributed to operational improvement at the portfolio company. Cohn, Hotchkiss and Towery, examining buyouts of privately held firms, found that acquirers disproportionately target companies with growth opportunities that are constrained by leverage and by reliance on external financing, and that those companies grow rapidly after the transaction, particularly where add-on acquisitions are made.

The relative weight of these drivers has shifted over time. An analysis by Bain & Company of approximately 430 fully realized buyout transactions completed in the United States and Western Europe between 2010 and 2019 found that multiple expansion accounted for nearly half of the increase in enterprise value. Bain subsequently reported that whereas a typical private equity investment in the 2010s required roughly 5 per cent average annual EBITDA growth to reach a 2.5× multiple on invested capital over a five-year holding period, comparable transactions in the mid-2020s required approximately 10 to 12 per cent.

This dependence on sustained earnings growth is the principal risk of the strategy. Where a conventional leveraged buyout can generate equity returns through debt repayment even with flat earnings, a growth buyout priced on expected expansion offers less protection if that expansion does not materialize or if exit multiples contract. Comparable evidence from outside the United States and Western Europe is less extensive; a study of Japanese buyouts found that post-buyout financial performance was associated with the replacement of incumbent chief executives in family-owned small and medium-sized enterprises.

== See also ==
- Management buyout
- Divisional buyout
