= Alex Israel (businessman) =

American businessman

Alexander Israel
- Education: University of Puget Sound
- Known for: Co-founder of Metropolis Technologies (CEO); Co-founder of ParkMe
- Board member of: National Parking Association

Alexander Israel is an American entrepreneur and angel investor known for being CEO and co-founder of Metropolis Technologies, an artificial intelligence company and the largest parking operator in North America. He previously co-founded ParkMe and served as its chief operating officer.

== Early life and education ==
Israel grew up in Los Angeles. His mother was a psychologist, and his father was a theatre set designer. He graduated from University of Puget Sound in 2006 with bachelor's degree in business and economics.

== Career ==
=== ParkMe ===
In 2007, Israel founded the digital parking platform ParkMe. He served as chief product officer and chief operating officer. The platform allows users to find and reserve parking spaces online, and pay for them digitally. By 2013, the company had expanded its services to 28,000 locations and launched a mobile app.

ParkMe was acquired in 2015 by INRIX, a spinoff of Microsoft Research which had previously been a partner of ParkMe since 2012.

=== Metropolis Technologies ===
Israel serves as CEO of Metropolis Technologies, which he co-founded in 2017. The company uses computer vision to recognize users and their vehicles, enabling it to process contactless payments and manage infrastructure. Israel coined the term "recognition economy" to describe the use of artificial intelligence to replace payment and identity infrastructure. In an article for Fortune, he described the recognition economy as the transition from the device-based transactions that predominated in the 2010s, to presence-based transactions utilizing artificial intelligence. In a recognition economy, a fully integrated artificial intelligence environment allows for consistent customer identification that carries through all interactions, eliminating the need to re-verify identity or payment details at every point of contact.

As of 2021, it operated in 600 different locations in the United States, and had offices in cities like San Francisco, Seattle, and New York City. The company raised $41 million in funding for this expansion. That year, the company also entered a partnership with Uber.

Under Israel, the company has adopted a growth buyout strategy of acquisition supported by investments from venture capital firms. The company acquired the Nashville based company Premier Parking in 2022. In 2024, it acquired SP Plus Corporation for $1.5 billion as part of a growth buyout strategy, which plans to leverage SP Plus' growth. It raised $1.8 billion in funding for this acquisition, led by venture capital firms and institutional investors such Eldridge Industries, 3L, BDT & MSD Partners, Vista Credit Partners, Temasek, Slow Ventures and Assembly Ventures. At the time of the acquisition, SP Plus had over 20,000 employees and 3,300 locations in North America. The acquisition made Metropolis the largest parking operator in North America. It has over 4,200 locations as of 2025.

The company raised an additional $1.6 billion in funding in 2025, led by LionTree, to begin providing its AI payment platform to companies in the fast food, gas station, and hotel industries. Israel described the company's expansion into retail payments as part of the emergence of the "recognition economy" as artificial intelligence is increasingly used in daily life.

Israel also serves on the board of the National Parking Association.

== Awards and recognition ==
Israel was included on Los Angeles Business Journal's "20 In Their 20s" list in 2013. He was included in the National Parking Association's "40 Under 40" list in 2016. In 2024, Ernst & Young named Israel "Entrepreneur of the Year" for Los Angeles. Metropolis Technologies received the LA Business Journal's "Innovator Award" in 2024.

In 2025, Israel was included in the LA Business Journal's "LA500" list, and Metropolis was included on the CNBC Disruptor 50 list in 2025 and 2026. In 2026, Metropolis Technologies was included on the TIME 100 lists of "Most Influential Companies" and "Industry Leaders".

He has been a regular speaker at the Milken Institute Global Conference.
