= Jeffrey Leiden =

CEO of biotechnology company

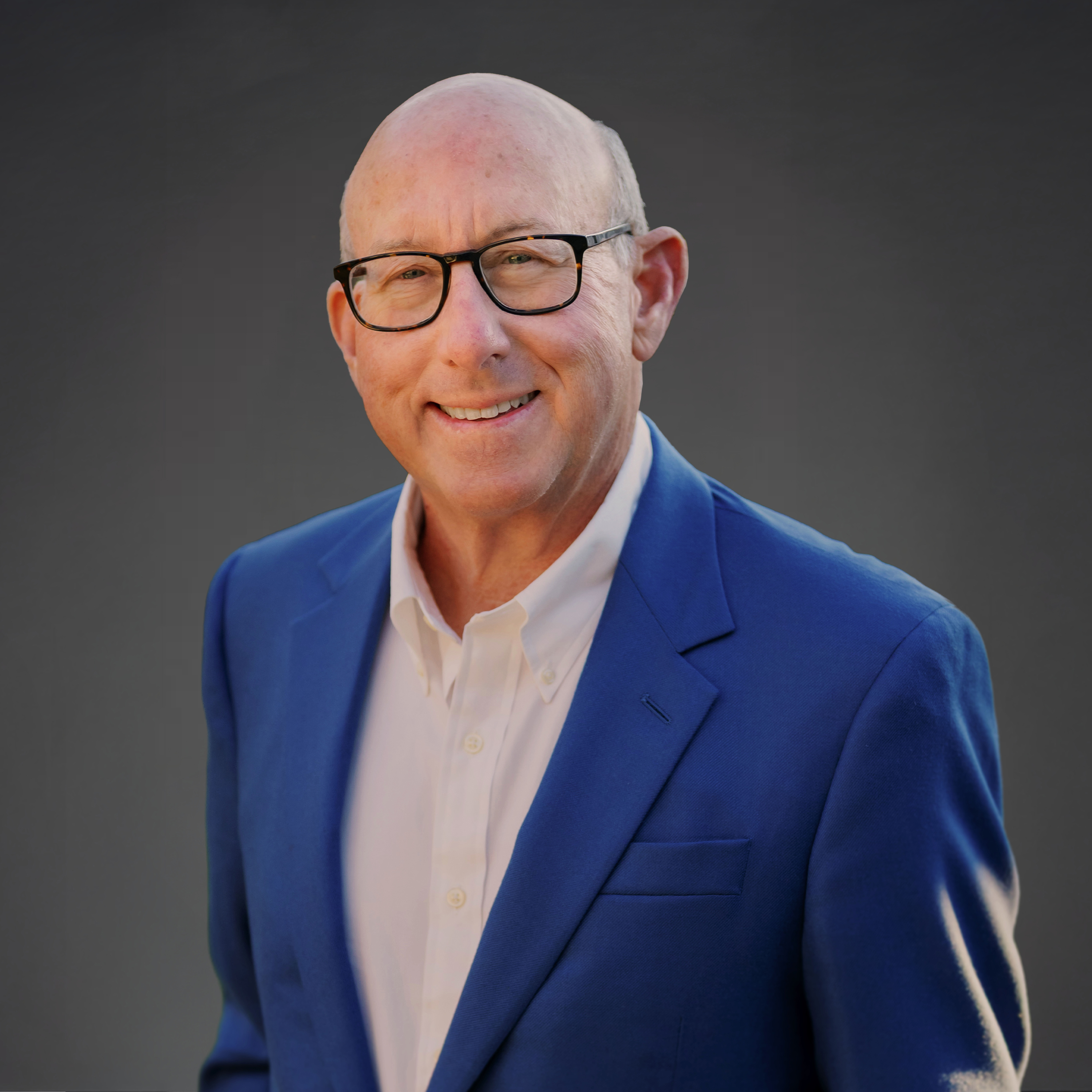
- Born: Glencoe, Illinois
- Education: University of Chicago
- Occupations: Executive Chairman, Vertex Pharmaceuticals
- Organizations: Clarus Ventures; Abbott Labs; Harvard School of Public Health and Medical School; Cardiogene; University of Chicago; Howard Hughes Medical Institute, University of Michigan
- Board member of: National Academy of Medicine; American Academy of Arts and Sciences; American Society for Clinical Investigation; Association of American Physicians; Harvard Medical School; Massachusetts Mutual Life Insurance Company; Massachusetts’s Governor’s Digital Healthcare Council; Governor’s STEM Advisory Council
- Awards: Ernst and Young Entrepreneur of the Year in Life Sciences (2017); Henri A. Termeer Innovative Leadership Award (2018); Academy of Distinguished Bostonians (2018); New Englander of the Year
- Website: Jeffrey Leiden

Jeffrey Leiden is an American physician, scientist and businessman who is the executive chairman of Vertex Pharmaceuticals, a biotechnology company based in Boston, Massachusetts. He was initially appointed to the board of directors of the company in 2009 and was CEO and president from February 2012 to March 2020.

== Early life ==
Leiden grew up in Glencoe, a suburb north of Chicago. His mother was a primary school teacher, and his father was a clinical psychologist with a PhD in psychology. He has one sister. His grandparents on his mother’s side were Russian immigrants. At ten years old he learned to scuba dive, and by eleven he was a certified scuba instructor.

== Education ==
Leiden attended a progressive public school in Glencoe, IL called North School which had a special self-paced learning program. In elementary school Leiden skipped second grade and started the University of Chicago after his junior year at New Trier East High School, at the age of 15.

He received his bachelor's degree in biological sciences at age 18, a Ph.D. in virology at age 21 and his M.D. at age 23 from the University of Chicago, where he later became Chief of Cardiology. He was elected to several honors societies, including Phi Beta Kappa and Alpha Omega Alpha. Between 1982 and 1987, Leiden was a clinical fellow in cardiology at the Brigham and Women’s Hospital, the Harvard Medical School and a postdoctoral fellow in medicine at the Dana–Farber Cancer Institute.

== Career ==
In 1987, Leiden was appointed assistant professor of medicine and assistant investigator in the Howard Hughes Medical Institute at the University of Michigan in Ann Arbor.

In 1992, Leiden moved to the University of Chicago as the Rawson Professor of Medicine and Pathology and chief of the Division of Cardiology.

In 1996, Leiden, along with Elizabeth and Gary Nabel founded Cardiogene, a gene therapy company, which was subsequently acquired by Boston Scientific.

In 1999, Leiden was appointed the Elkin Blout Professor of Biological Sciences at the Harvard School of Public Health and Professor of medicine at the Harvard Medical School.

Leiden moved to Abbott Labs in June 2000, as senior vice president and chief scientific officer. Later that year, he was promoted to president and chief operating officer and oversaw all aspects of the company’s global pharmaceutical business, where he led the development and launch of Kaletra and Humira.

In 2006, Leiden joined Clarus Ventures as a managing director. At Clarus, Leiden founded and chaired the boards of Lycera Corporation and Variation Biotechnologies, and served as chairman of the board of TyRx, Inc., which was subsequently acquired by Medtronic (NYSE: MDT).

=== Vertex ===
Leiden served as chairman, president and chief executive officer of Vertex from 2012 to 2020. Under his leadership, Vertex developed and launched Kalydeco, Orkambi, Symdeko and Trikafta – the first medicines to treat the underlying cause of cystic fibrosis. The FDA approved Trikafta on October 21, 2019.

In 2015 Leiden established a collaboration between Vertex and CRISPR Therapeutics that led to the discovery and development of Casgevy, (exagamglogene autotemcel; formerly known as CTX001), the first gene editing treatment to show curative potential for two human genetic diseases, sickle cell disease and beta thalassemia. Casgevy was approved for use in the UK (November 2023), the United States (January 2024) and Europe, (February 2024.)

In 2015 Vertex shareholders voted to recommend reducing Leiden's compensation from its 2014 estimated figure of US$48.5 million. By 2017 his earnings totaled approximately US$17.3 million. Also under his leadership, Vertex acquired Semma Therapeutics for $950 million in 2019. The company developed stem cell-derived therapies including the experimental cell therapy for Type 1 diabetes known as VX-880.

Criticism of Vertex pricing structures for Orkambi, a groundbreaking cystic fibrosis drug costing in the region of US$135,000 to US$270,000 per patient per year depending on the patient's country, has resulted in campaigns by concerned parent groups addressed to Leiden. Leiden wrote to the UK Prime Minister Theresa May in 2018, suggesting Vertex might consider reducing investment in the UK as a result of the lack of agreement between Vertex and the UK's National Health Service on the pricing of a five-year access agreement for Vertex drugs.

On October 24, 2019, Vertex reached an agreement with NHS England for all currently licensed Vertex cystic fibrosis medicines, having previously reached similar agreements with countries including Scotland, Ireland and France. On June 20, 2024, the National Institute for Health and Care Excellence, (NICE) said in its final draft guidance that Orkambi, Symkevi, and Kaftrio are recommended for the treatment of Cystic Fibrosis, with Vertex coming to a long-term, extended, reimbursement agreement with the NHS. This final decision differs from its provisional draft guidance from November 2023 that recommended that the three drugs were above the acceptable range of NHS resources in terms of cost effectiveness, despite positive outcomes for Cystic Fibrosis patients.

While Leiden served as chairman, the market capitalization of Vertex Pharmaceuticals increased from $7.74 billion at the beginning of 2012 to $69.97 billion in April 2020.

On April 1, 2020, Leiden transitioned to the role of executive chairman. He was succeeded by Reshma Kewalramani, who was previously the company's chief medical officer. Leiden currently serves as executive chairman.

== Boards and awards ==
He is an elected member of the National Academy of Medicine, the American Academy of Arts and Sciences, the American Society for Clinical Investigation and the Association of American Physicians. He currently serves as a lead independent director of the Massachusetts Mutual Life Insurance Company, and was the former vice chairman of Shire Pharmaceuticals and was formerly a director of PathAI, Millennium Pharmaceuticals, Abbott Labs, Quest Diagnostics, and TAP Pharmaceuticals. Leiden is also the chairman of Casana, a home health monitoring company. In May 2022 Leiden was appointed as Chairman of the Board of Odyssey Therapeutics, a company developing novel medicines for cancer and auto-immune disease.

Leiden was named a Crain’s Chicago Business 40 Under 40 in 1994; and served as a member of the NHLBI Board of Scientific Counselors between 1994 and 1999. In 2000, he was president of the American Society for Clinical Investigation.

In 2017, Ernst and Young named Leiden an Entrepreneur of the Year in Life Sciences. In 2018, the Massachusetts Biotechnology Council awarded Leiden the Henri A. Termeer Innovative Leadership Award; and the Greater Boston Chamber of Commerce named Leiden to the Academy of Distinguished Bostonians. Leiden was also named one of Boston Business Journal’s Power 50 for several years, including most recently in 2022. In 2018 and 2020, he was named as part of Boston Magazine’s 100 Most Influential People in Boston and was honored as a New Englander of the Year by the New England Council. In 2018 he was named “Best Biopharma CEO” by STAT News. In December 2020 Jeffrey Leiden was honored with the Forbes Lifetime Achievement in BioPharma Award at the 2020 Forbes Healthcare Summit.

Leiden also served in 2016 as co-chairman of the Massachusetts’s Governor’s Digital Healthcare Council; is a member of the Governor's Task Force on Artificial Intelligence; and the Governor’s STEM Advisory Council.

In 2018 he was honored with the "New Englander of the Year Award" by the New England Council.

Leiden was ranked 13th on Forbes' list of most innovative leaders for 2019, the highest-ranking leader in the healthcare/biotech sector.

He is trustee of the Boston Symphony Orchestra.

Leiden is a member of the MIT Presidential CEO Advisory Board.

In November 2022 Leiden was named as one of several strategic advisors for the newly launched Life Sciences Private Capital, a private equity division of J.P. Morgan.

He is a director of the Massachusetts Competitive Partnership (MACP) and previously served as chair from January 2020 to December 2022.

== Philanthropy ==
In December 2017, Leiden and his wife Lisa established a professorship in translational medicine at the Brigham and Women’s Hospital and Harvard Medical School. The Leidens are also major donors to the Museum of Fine Arts, Boston, Ariadne Labs and the Bottom Line Foundation.
