= The Last Jews of Libya =

- Directed by: Vivienne Roumani
- Written by: Vivienne Roumani; Joseph Dorman
- Produced by: Aryeh Bourkoff
- Narrated by: Isabella Rossellini
- Cinematography: Vivienne Roumani; Thomas Geyer
- Edited by: Amanda Zinoman
- Music by: Maurice Roumani Daniel Roumani; Jonathon Roumani Elia Roumani
- Release date: 2 May 2007
- Running time: 50 minutes
- Country: United States
- Language: English

The Last Jews of Libya is a 2007 American documentary film directed by Vivienne Roumani.

== Synopsis ==
The film traces Jewish life in Libya as far back as the 3rd century B.C. It focuses on the Roumani family, residents of Benghazi for centuries, beginning during the Turkish Ottoman rule. The family is transformed by advances in European culture and through its relations with Arabs, though maintaining their unique religious practices. Much of the film deals with the last decades of the family's life in Libya. At the close of World War II, there were 36,000 Jews in Libya, though due to rising Arab nationalism almost all left in the next several years. Nowadays they have all left the country. The Last Jews in Libya is narrated by Isabella Rossellini and features archival film and photographs. It raises questions of family, community, and identity.

== Production ==
Director Vivienne Roumani was inspired by her eldest son Aryeh Bourkoff's request for something about the family history that he could show to his children some day. Even though she had never directed a film before, she decided to create a film. It was aided by the discovery of her mother Elise Roumani's memoirs. Vivienne Roumani travelled around the world to interview several generations of her family in English, Hebrew, Italian and Arabic in order to make the film. She managed to film over 80 hours of material and collected 1,000 photographs, which needed to be condensed into a film. The Sundance Channel executive Larry Aidem, an acquaintance of Bourkoff, helped put him in contact with Amanda Zinoman, who edited the film.

== Release and reception ==
The Last Jews of Libya premiered at the Tribeca Film Festival on May 2, 2007. It was also screened at the Jerusalem International Film Festival, the Sao Paulo International Film Festival, and several Jewish film festivals. The film was shown at the Library of Congress, followed by a discussion from the filmmaker. The Sundance Channel purchased rights to the film to air it.

The film received a positive reception. Star magazine wrote "Anyone who's ever wondered about their family history especially when that history involved fleeing from persecution will find The Last Jews of Libya fascinating and moving." George Robinson of The Jewish Week wrote that "viewers are given concrete examples of the workings of history on individuals, and history has an appealing and entirely human face." Judy Lash Balint of Blogcritics magazine called it "a moving documentary."
