= Bryan Mistele =

- Born: 1968 (age 57–58)
- Education: University of Michigan (BS), Harvard Business School (MBA
- Occupation: Business executive
- Known for: GPS probe-based traffic information
- Title: Co-founder, president and CEO, INRIX

Bryan Mistele is an American technology executive who is the co-founder, president, and chief executive officer of INRIX, a Kirkland, Washington-based provider of traffic information, connected-car services, and mobility analytics. Before founding INRIX, he was a general manager at Microsoft, where he led the company's Automotive Business Unit. Mistele has served on several U.S. transportation policy bodies and is a frequent speaker on the topic of the future of transportation.

== Early life and education ==
Mistele earned a B.S. in computer engineering from the University of Michigan in 1990 and an MBA from Harvard Business School in 1995. Early in his career, he worked at the Ford Motor Company.

== Career ==
=== Microsoft ===
Mistele joined Microsoft in August 1995 as a program manager responsible for the business & finance category of The Microsoft Network. As general manager of Microsoft's Automotive Business Unit, Mistele oversaw the company's in-vehicle software effort. He was responsible for building four businesses: automotive telematics, mobile services, the real-estate service HomeAdvisor, and Microsoft's personal finance and investing properties.

=== INRIX ===
Mistele co-founded INRIX in June 2004 with Craig Chapman. The company was built on the idea of using GPS signals to create traffic information, combined with traffic-prediction research from Microsoft Research, which had begun in 2002 with a machine-learning system called JamBayes that predicted how long congestion on Seattle highways would last. Microsoft licensed the methods, tools and software to INRIX in 2004. INRIX raised $6.1 million in its first funding round in April 2005, from August Capital and Venrock Associates. A second round of $10 million followed in May 2006, with Bain Capital Ventures joining as a new investor. In October 2007, the company raised $15 million from August Capital, Bain Capital and Venrock.

INRIX combined data from government road sensors, such as toll-tag readers, cameras, radar units and pavement sensors, with speed and location readings from GPS units in vehicles owned by trucking and delivery companies. It blended these readings with historical traffic patterns, weather, construction schedules and event data to estimate and forecast traffic conditions.

In May 2006, INRIX launched Dust Network, which drew anonymous GPS reports from more than 500,000 commercial fleet, delivery and taxi vehicles across the United States. At launch it covered 30 U.S. cities and 10,000 miles of roads. The approach was adopted by public agencies. In 2007, the Wisconsin Department of Transportation accepted INRIX probe-based data for 250 miles of highway. In January 2008, the I-95 Corridor Coalition, a group of transportation agencies from 16 eastern states, awarded INRIX a multi-year contract to supply probe-based traffic data for about 1,500 miles of freeway and 1,000 miles of arterial roads between New Jersey and North Carolina, drawing on more than 750,000 GPS-equipped vehicles.

In January of 2009, INRIX announced at CES that it would supply the traffic information to Ford Motor Company for its SYNC Traffic, Directions and Information services, including traffic, routing, and other services. By 2010, the INRIX network, called the Smart Driver Network, included more than two million GPS-enabled vehicles reporting on over 260,000 miles of U.S. roads, and more than 40 percent of state transportation departments were using the company's data for operations and planning. By late 2012, INRIX was collecting data from about 100 million drivers across 35 countries and supplied traffic information to six of the eight largest automakers with built-in navigation.

Under Mistele, INRIX expanded internationally, acquiring the British traffic information company ITIS Holdings in 2011. The same year it raised $37 million in a round led by Kleiner Perkins. In 2014, his company announced investments by Intel Capital and Porsche SE, and in 2015 it acquired the parking-data company ParkMe, extending its services from traffic into parking.

=== Transportation policy and industry roles ===
Mistele has been a member of the Bipartisan Policy Center's National Transportation Policy Project and of the United States Department of Transportation's Intelligent Transportation Systems Advisory Committee. He has also served on the board of the Intelligent Transportation Society of America.

With venture capitalist Tom Alberg of Madrona Venture Group, he co-founded ACES Northwest, an industry network focused on autonomous, connected, electric and shared vehicles in the Pacific Northwest. He also serves on the board of the Discovery Institute. He has spoken on transportation technology at venues including the U.S. Department of Transportation's Volpe National Transportation Systems Center.

== Personal life ==
Mistele is married, has two sons and lives in Kirkland, Washington. He grew up sailing and lists boating, skiing and windsurfing among his hobbies.
