= Aryeh Bourkoff =

Founder and CEO of LionTree LLC

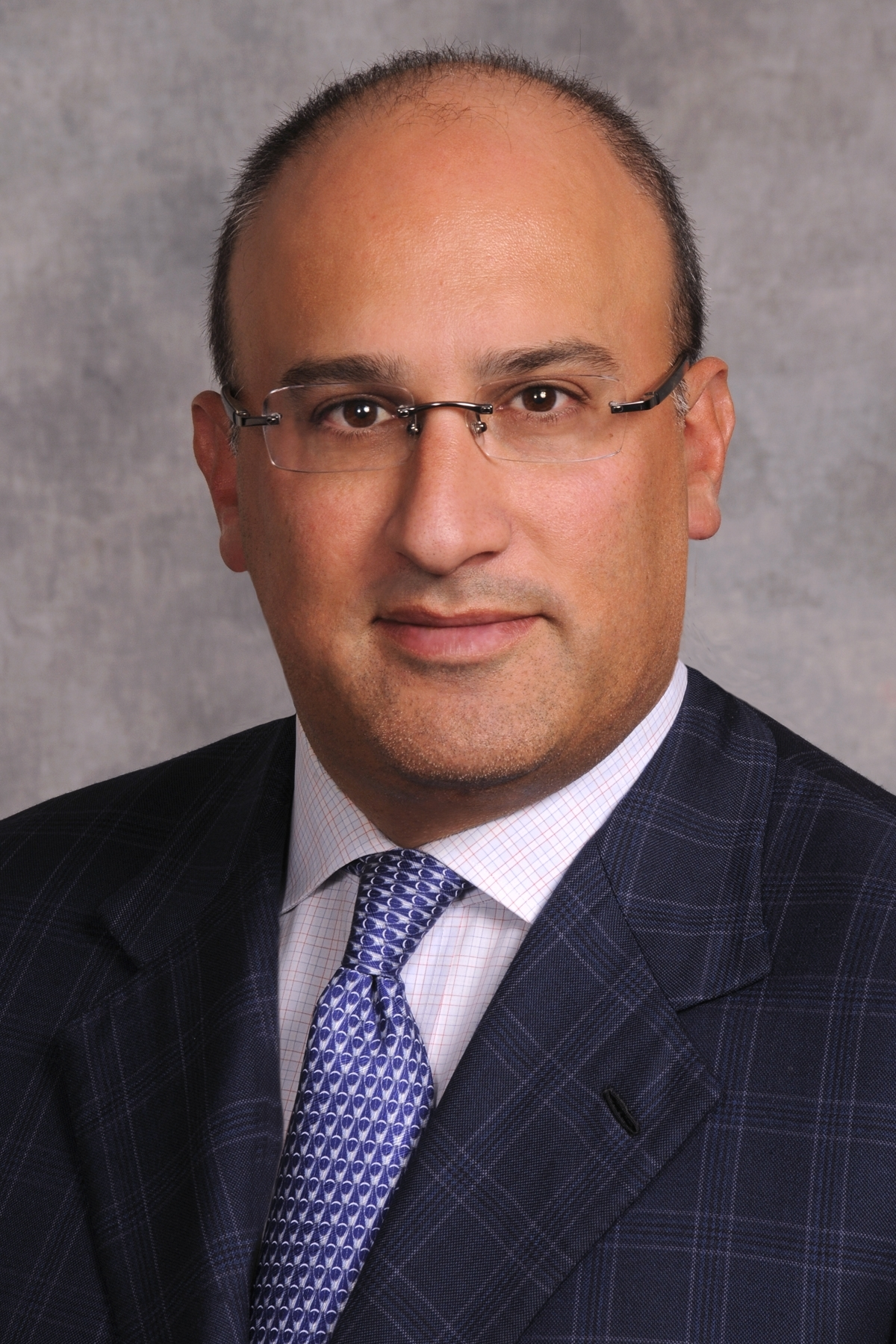
- Born: 1972 (age 53–54); Palo Alto, California
- Education: University of California, San Diego (BA)
- Title: Founder and CEO of LionTree LLC

Aryeh B. Bourkoff (born 1972) is an American businessman and documentary producer. He is the founder and chief executive officer of LionTree LLC, a global investment and merchant banking firm focused on media, technology and telecommunications.

== Early life and education ==
Bourkoff was born in 1972 in Palo Alto, California. The son of filmmaker Vivienne Roumani, and is of Libyan Jewish ancestry. Bourkoff attended high school at Baltimore City College High School, graduating in 1991. Bourkoff holds a B.A. in Economics from the University of California at San Diego.

== Career ==
Bourkoff began his career as a high-yield fixed income research analyst at Smith Barney from 1995 to 1997 and at CIBC World Markets Corp from 1997 to 1999.

Bourkoff moved to UBS in 1999, where he began as a fixed income research analyst, and later an equity analyst as well. In 2005, he became the first sector analyst ranked No. 1 for equity, fixed income and hedge funds in the same year by Institutional Investor. Institutional Investor also named him a top ranked fixed-income analyst in the cable and satellite sector from 2000 to 2007.

In 2007, Bourkoff was named Head of the Media and Communications Research Group, and two years later was named the Joint Global Head of Telecom, Media and Technology Investment Banking. In 2011, Bourkoff was appointed Vice Chairman and Head of Americas Investment Banking, and became a member of the UBS Investment Banking Executive Committee. While Vice Chairman at UBS, Bourkoff was recognized by Fortune Magazine on their “40 under 40” list.

After 13 years at UBS, Bourkoff founded LionTree in 2012, and is its CEO. In March 2017, LionTree Partners founded Ocelot Partners, a special-purpose acquisition company that focuses on investment opportunities in the European TMT sector, along with Andrew Barron and Martin E. Franklin.

On August 14, 2020, Daily Front Row listed Bourkoff as one of a group of high profile investors who purchased W magazine, a troubled fashion magazine. Bourkoff organized US$1million in startup funding for Punchbowl News, a Capitol Hill insider-reporting online news service, led by prominent former Politico reporters.

In 2021, he was described as 'media's hottest dealmaker' by The Hollywood Reporter, noting his role in organize WarnerMedia's merger with Discovery and Amazon's acquisition of Metro-Goldwyn-Mayer.

== Politics ==
Bourkoff, a Democrat, has a long history as a fund-raiser for Vice President Kamala Harris, but also is reportedly close to Jared Kushner (son-in-law of former President Donald Trump).

== Philanthropy ==
Today, Bourkoff serves as a trustee of the Foundation Fighting Blindness, and is a member of the Council on Foreign Relations. Additionally, Bourkoff is a member of the Board of Trustees of The Paley Center for Media, the New York Philanthropic Advisory Board of UNICEF, the Royal Academy of Arts America Board, and Lincoln Center’s Business Advisory Council as well as the Lincoln Center Media & Entertainment Council. Bourkoff has served on the Board of Trustees at Carnegie Hall since at least 2019.

== Personal life ==
Bourkoff is the producer of two documentary films, Out of Print and The Last Jews of Libya, both of which had their premieres at the Tribeca Film Festival. Bourkoff currently lives in New York City with his wife Elana and their four children.
