= HackHands =

Online technology mentoring platform

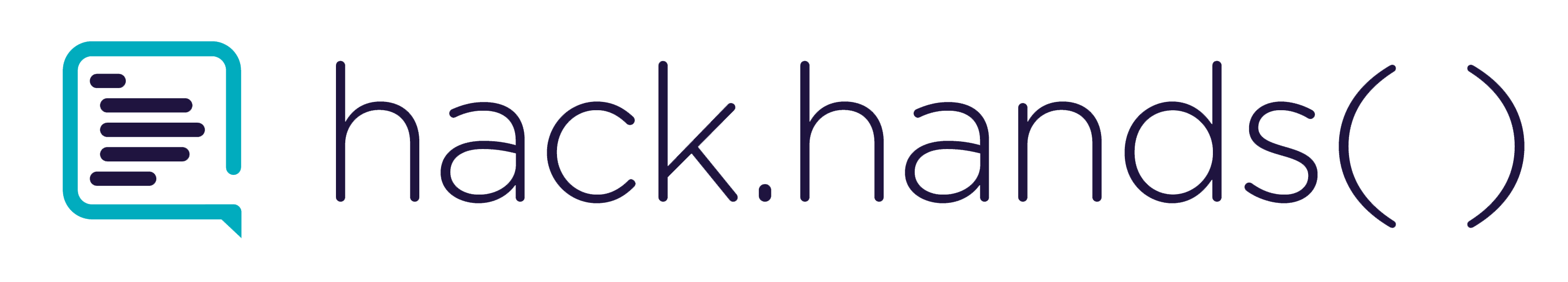
- Type: Private subsidiary
- Industry: Online Education
- Founded: 2013
- Headquarters: Farmington, Utah, U.S.
- Area served: Globally
- Products: E-mentoring; Online Technical Training
- Parent: Pluralsight
- Website: www.hackhands.com

HackHands (stylized as hack.hands()) is an online learning platform for computer programming and coding. Users pay to communicate with programming mentors via video calls, screen sharing, and shared text editors.

== History ==
HackHands was founded by 6PS Group, a web development company, in 2013.

In 2014, HackHands founded HackPledge, an initiative to encourage industry experts to mentor and teach novice developers. The company also launched the HackSummit, a programming conference that had more than 64,000 registrants.

On July 9, 2015, Pluralsight, an online education company, announced it had acquired HackHands.
