= Suzetrigine =

Non-opioid analgesic drug

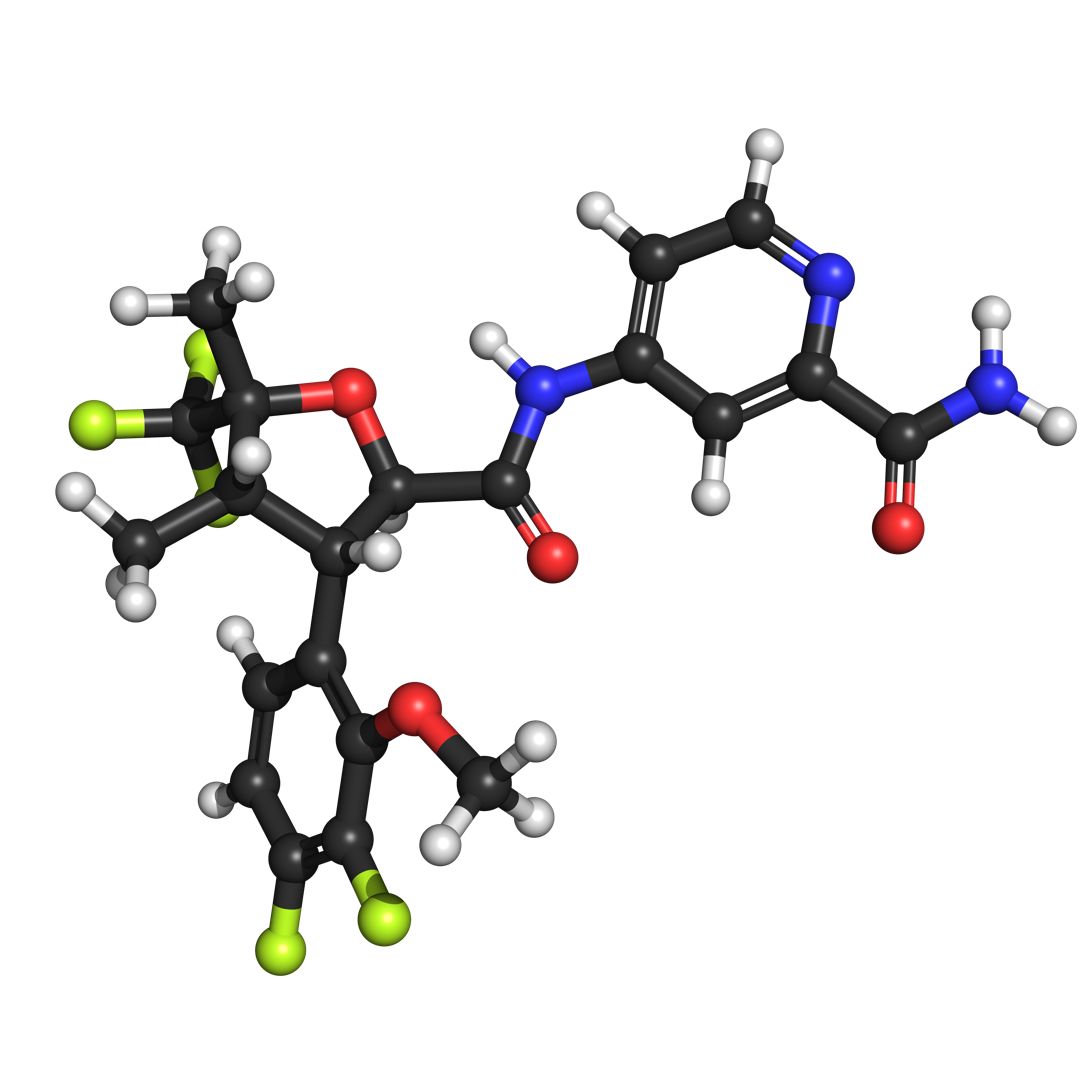

Clinical data
- Pronunciation: /suˈzɛtrɪdʒiːn/ soo-ZE-tri-jeen
- Trade names: Journavx
- Other names: VX-548; VX548
- AHFS/Drugs.com: Monograph
- MedlinePlus: a625039
- License data: US DailyMed: Suzetrigine
- Routes of administration: Oral
- Drug class: Na_{v}1.8 sodium channel blocker; analgesic
- ATC code: None

Legal status
- Legal status: US: ℞-only

Pharmacokinetic data
- Bioavailability: Unknown
- Protein binding: 99%
- Metabolism: CYP3A4
- Metabolites: M6-SUZ (active)
- Onset of action: 3 hours (T_{max})
- Elimination half-life: Suzetrigine: 23.6 hours M6-SUZ: 33 hours
- Excretion: Feces: 49.9% Urine: 44%

Identifiers
- IUPAC name: 4-[[(2R,3S,4S,5R)-3-(3,4-Difluoro-2-methoxyphenyl)-4,5-dimethyl-5-(trifluoromethyl)oxolane-2-carbonyl]amino]pyridine-2-carboxamide
- CAS Number: 2649467-58-1
- PubChem CID: 156445116
- DrugBank: DB18927
- ChemSpider: 128942439
- UNII: LOG73M21H5
- KEGG: D12860
- ChEMBL: ChEMBL5314487

Chemical and physical data
- Formula: C_{21}H_{20}F_{5}N_{3}O_{4}
- Molar mass: 473.400 g·mol^{−1}
- 3D model (JSmol): Interactive image
- SMILES: COc1c([C@H]2[C@H](C(=O)Nc3ccnc(C(N)=O)c3)O[C@@](C)(C(F)(F)F)[C@H]2C)ccc(F)c1F
- InChI: InChI=1S/C21H20F5N3O4/c1-9-14(11-4-5-12(22)15(23)16(11)32-3)17(33-20(9,2)21(24,25)26)19(31)29-10-6-7-28-13(8-10)18(27)30/h4-9,14,17H,1-3H3,(H2,27,30)(H,28,29,31)/t9-,14-,17-,20-/m0/s1; Key:XSQUJFKRXZMOKA-PAFIKIDNSA-N

Suzetrigine, sold under the brand name Journavx, is an analgesic medication used in the treatment of moderate to severe acute pain. It is taken orally. Suzetrigine was developed by Vertex Pharmaceuticals.

The most common adverse effects include itching, muscle spasms, increased blood level of creatine phosphokinase, and rash.

Suzetrigine is a small-molecule non-opioid analgesic that works as a selective inhibitor of Na_{v}1.8-dependent pain-signaling pathways in the peripheral nervous system. Na_{v}1.8 channels are predominantly present in peripheral nociceptive neurons of the dorsal root ganglia. Suzetrigine inhibits pain signals before they reach the central nervous system and has no addictive potential.

Suzetrigine was approved for medical use in the United States in January 2025. The US Food and Drug Administration considers it to be a first-in-class medication.

== Medical uses ==
Suzetrigine is indicated for the treatment of moderate to severe acute pain in adults. It was primarily studied in people with postoperative pain, including due to abdominoplasty and bunionectomy. However, a small minority of patients received suzetrigine for non-surgical pain, including arthralgias, limb pain, and sprains and strains. Treatment of acute pain using suzetrigine has not been studied beyond 14 days of use.

In clinical studies conducted through 2024, suzetrigine reduced pain typically from 7 to 4 on the standard numeric scale used to rate pain. The efficacy of suzetrigine was evaluated in two randomized, double-blind, placebo- and active-controlled trials of acute surgical pain, one following abdominoplasty and the other following bunionectomy. Both trials found that suzetrigine reduced pain more effectively than placebo. Suzetrigine was not superior to placebo for the treatment of lumbosacral radiculopathy.

However, in clinical studies, no superiority over hydrocodone and paracetamol (acetaminophen) in terms of pain reduction was shown over 48 hours. Medical professionals have noted its efficacy may be inferior to high-dose opioid analgesics. There are no studies comparing suzetrigine with high-dose opioids. Suzetrigine exhibits CYP3A4-mediated drug interactions and there is limited long-term data regarding its use. Moreover, usage has not been studied in those younger than 18 or older than 80 years of age and its cost-effectiveness is disputed.

== Contraindications ==
Concomitant use of suzetrigine with strong CYP3A4 inhibitors is contraindicated.

== Adverse effects ==
The most common adverse effects of suzetrigine may include itching, rash, muscle spasms, and increased levels of creatine kinase. Mild side effects may include nausea, vomiting, constipation, headache, and dizziness. In preliminary research, suzetrigine had no serious neurological, behavioral, addictive, or cardiovascular effects.

Patients with severe hepatic impairment (Child-Pugh Class C) are recommended to avoid using suzetrigine, and a lower dose is recommended for patients with moderate hepatic impairment (Child-Pugh Class B) due to an increased risk of adverse reactions.

As of 2026, safety beyond 14 days of suzetrigine use for acute pain has not been determined and long-term side effects have not been established. There is no human data regarding the safety of suzetrigine use during pregnancy and breastfeeding. Safety in pediatric patients has also not been established.

== Interactions ==
Consuming grapefruit while using suzetrigine may cause adverse grapefruit–drug interactions.

Patients using a hormonal contraceptives that contains progestins other than levonorgestrel and norethindrone are advised to use an additional non-hormonal contraceptive or an alternative hormonal method during concomitant use with suzetrigine and 28 after using suzetrigine due to a risk of suzetrigine interacting with certain hormonal contraceptives and reversing their impact.

== Chemistry ==
The chemical name of suzetrigine is 4-[(2R,3S,4S,5R)-3-(3,4-difluoro-2-methoxyphenyl)-4,5-dimethyl-5-(trifluoromethyl)oxolane-2-amido]pyridine2-carboxamide. Its molecular formula is C_{21}H_{20}F_{5}N_{3}O_{4} and it has a molecular weight of 473.39 g/mol.

== Pharmacology ==
=== Pharmacodynamics ===
Suzetrigine operates on Na_{v}1.8 channels predominately found in the peripheral nociceptive neurons of the dorsal root ganglia. Na_{v}1.8 channels are involved in the generation of action potentials in the nociceptive neurons of the peripheral nervous system, playing a key role in the transmission of pain signals. Suzetrigine works by selectively blocking Nav1.8 channels. It binds to the voltage-sensing domain 2 of Na_{v}1.8 channels with a 3,100-times greater affinity than to other voltage-gated sodium channels. Suzetrigine selectively binds to this site with a novel allosteric mechanism, thereby stabilizing the closed state and causing tonic inhibition.

Suzetrigine's mechanism avoids the addictive potential of opioids caused by their effects on the reward system in the central nervous system. Unlike opioid medications, which reduce pain signals in the brain, suzetrigine works by closing sodium channels in peripheral nerves, inhibiting painful sensations from being transmitted to the brain.

=== Pharmacokinetics ===
Suzetrigine is well-absorbed from the GI tract, with the 50mg maintenance dose being relatively unaffected by meal timing, and the 100mg initial dose requiring an empty stomach for proper absorption. The median maximum plasma concentration (T_{max}) is reached within 3 hours of a single oral dose under fasting conditions and about 5 hour when taken with food. The volume of distribution is estimated at 495 L. Suzetrigine has a mean effective half-life of 23.6 hours. Two doses a day allow for maintaining therapeutic plasma levels. Suzetrigine is 99% protein-bound; its active metabolite, M6-SUZ, has a mean effective half-life of 33 hours and is 96% protein-bound. Steady-state concentrations are reached within 3 days. The primary metabolic pathway is via CYP3A isozymes, followed by excretion via feces (49.9%) and urine (44%).

== History ==
Vertex Pharmaceuticals announced in January 2024, that suzetrigine had successfully met several endpoints in its phase III clinical trials. The company announced in July 2024 that the US Food and Drug Administration (FDA) had accepted a New Drug Application for suzetrigine. Due to its novel mechanism, the FDA granted priority review, fast track, and breakthrough therapy designations to the application for suzetrigine. In January 2025, the FDA granted approval of Journavx to Vertex Pharmaceuticals, making it the first non-opioid pain medication to be approved by the FDA in two decades.

As of November 2025, phase IV post-marketing clinical trials are underway to assess the effectiveness and safety of suzetrigine as a part of multimodal therapy for the treatment of acute post-operative pain.

The manufacturer engaged in lobbying activity promoting non-opioid pain treatment and supporting the NO PAIN Act (Non-Opioids Prevent Addiction In the Nation Act).

== Society and culture ==
=== Legal status ===
Suzetrigine was approved for medical use in the United States in January 2025.

=== Names ===
Suzetrigine is the international nonproprietary name.

Suzetrigine is sold under the brand name Journavx.
