= INRIX =

American traffic data company

INRIX, Inc.
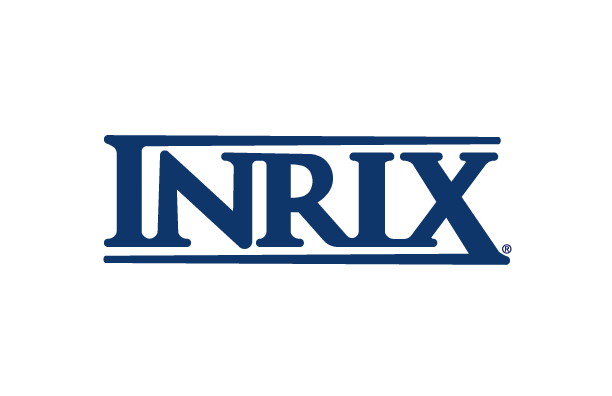
- INRIX, Inc. logo as of Dec 2012
- Type: Private
- Industry: Analytics, automotive, mobility and transportation
- Founded: July 2004; 22 years ago
- Founders: Bryan Mistele, Craig Chapman
- Headquarters: Kirkland, Washington, United States
- Key people: Bryan Mistele (CEO); Mark Daymond (CTO); Thadd Stricker (CFO); Chico Gersappe (CRO)
- Products: Roadway traffic, mobility analytics, safety, parking
- Owner: August Capital, Venrock, Bain Capital Ventures, Kleiner Perkins, Porsche SE, Intel Capital
- Number of employees: 350 (May 2019)
- Website: www.inrix.com

INRIX, Inc. was a company headquartered in Bellevue, Washington, US. It provided location-based data and software-as-a-service analytics—such as real-time and historical traffic conditions, road safety, and parking availability—to automakers, businesses, cities, and road authorities worldwide, as well as turn-by-turn navigation applications such as Google Waze. INRIX also published research reports on traffic congestion, parking, roadway safety, retail site selection, and autonomous vehicles in major cities. On October 16th, 2026, INRIX was acquired by Arity, a subsidiary of Allstate.

== History ==
INRIX was founded in 2004 by Bryan Mistele and Craig Chapman and spun out technology from Microsoft Research. Since 2005, the company has raised $129 million in venture capital funding over five rounds from August Capital, Venrock, Bain Capital Ventures, Kleiner Perkins, Porsche SE, and Intel Capital. INRIX acquired ITIS (a provider of daily traffic and travel information to European drivers), ParkMe, and OpenCar in 2011, 2015, and 2016, respectively.

In November 2023, INRIX acquired the Portland-based shared mobility platform Ride Report.

== Technology ==
INRIX collects anonymized data on congestion, traffic incidents, parking, and weather-related road conditions from billions of data points daily in more than 145 countries. The data is aggregated from connected cars and mobile devices, cameras and sensors on roadways, and major events expected to affect traffic. The company makes this analysis available through SaaS cloud-based applications for businesses and road authorities to understand mobility trends. INRIX works with local authorities to digitize rules of the road for highly automated vehicles (HAVs) operating on public roads, and information gathered from HAVs can be used for infrastructure improvements.

== Applications ==
INRIX apps and APIs include: INRIX IQ, a suite of SaaS applications that compile and analyze traffic patterns, congestion, traffic signals, safety, and other transportation information used by commuters, businesses, and municipal planners;INRIX AI Traffic, which uses anonymized data from mobile phones and vehicles to provide historical, real-time, and predictive traffic data to road authorities and drivers; INRIX Parking, which helps users find available parking and compares prices.

INRIX products and analysis are used in three main areas.

Safety – Safety View by GM Future Roads and INRIX is an application used by city transportation planners to analyze data on vehicle crashes, traffic speed, vulnerable road users (e.g. pedestrians, motorcyclists, and bicyclists), and US Census data. This information is used by local authorities to improve road safety and measure the effectiveness of road safety efforts. Safety View data was used to analyze road speeds and safety around 27 schools in Washington DC.

Efficiency – INRIX works with national, state and local DOTs to identify inefficiencies in traffic flow in real time, allowing local authorities to reduce congestion and vehicle emissions while saving time and money. The resulting infrastructural performance assessments are used to improve traffic-light timing, road configuration, signage and other mobility information.

Environmental – Transportation planners use INRIX data and tools to analyze traffic patterns, congestion, traffic signals, safety and another mobility information. Municipal and state transportation authorities use these insights to reduce delays and bottlenecks and other inefficiencies in their transportation arteries, thus reducing carbon emissions.

== Partnerships ==
INRIX has formed partnerships with academic, state, local, and federal institutions to design and implement its research. These include Texas A&M Transport Institute and the University of Maryland Center for Advanced Transportation Technology Laboratory (CATT Lab).
