= Vivienne Roumani =

American filmmaker

- Born: Vivienne Roumani; Benghazi, Libya
- Occupations: Director, filmmaker, documentarian
- Years active: 1989–present
- Parents: Joseph Roumani (father); Elise Tammam Roumani (mother)
- Website: http://vivienneroumani.com

Vivienne Roumani-Denn is an American oral historian and filmmaker. She created the first web site of the Jews of Libya and she is the director of critically acclaimed films The Last Jews of Libya and Out of Print.

== Filmography ==
Year	Film	Role	Genre	Ref.
2007	The Last Jews of Libya	Director	Documentary	
2013	Thanks	producer	Short film	
2013	Out of Print	Director, producer	Documentary	
2019	Purity	executive producer	Short film	

== Early life and education ==
Vivienne Roumani was born in Benghazi, Libya, and immigrated to the US at the age of twelve. She attended high school in Brookline, Massachusetts, and received a BA from Simmons College with majors in Philosophy and French and a minor in Spanish. She subsequently earned a Master of Library Science degree from the University of Maryland and a Master of Administrative Science from the Johns Hopkins University.

== Career ==
Vivienne Roumani held library management positions at the Johns Hopkins University (Director, Interlibrary Loan), The Library of Congress (Director, Loan Division), and the University of California, Berkeley (Head, Interlibrary Loan; Head, Earth Sciences & Map Libraries; Judaica Librarian). In 1999 she became the Founding Director of the Sephardic Library and Archives of the American Sephardi Federation (ASF) at the Center for Jewish History in New York, and she served as the Executive Director of ASF from 2000 to 2003.

In 1998/99, while the Judaica Librarian at Berkeley, Roumani conducted extensive oral histories of Jews from Libya, and she created the first webpage about Jewish life in Libya: jewsoflibya.com. The response to this website from young Libyans showed that they had been unaware of the presence of Jews in Libya. Some wrote that they had asked their grandparents and been told that there had indeed been a Jewish community in Libya. She has continued to obtain oral histories from the survivors of this community, and their testimonies are incorporated in her lecturing and writing.

Roumani turned to filmmaking in 2004. Her documentary The Last Jews of Libya (Director, Cinematographer, Writer), narrated by Isabella Rossellini, premiered at the 2007 Tribeca Film Festival in New York and was screened at film festivals worldwide and on cable TV in the United States. It was re-issued in 2017, with the addition of new material and subtitles in Italian, English, and Hebrew, as The Last Jews of Libya Revisited, in commemoration of the fiftieth anniversary of the end of the Jewish community in Libya.

She created VR Films in 2013 for the production of her prize-winning documentary Out of Print (Director, co-Producer), narrated by Meryl Streep and featuring Jeff Bezos, Scott Turow, Ray Bradbury, John Perry Barlow and others. Out of Print premiered at the Tribeca Film Festival in 2013 and was screened at film festivals and on TV and cable channels in the United States and worldwide.

Roumani also collaborated with musician Gerard Edery to create two productions: Flamenco Sepharad, a musical and dance performance (2001), and The Spirit of Sepharad: From Casbah to Caliphate, a multi-media performance with music, dance, and film (2008). Both have been performed at venues in the United States and worldwide.

== Selected publications ==
The Jews of Cyrenaica during World War II, in their own words, Sephardic Horizons, 11(2-3), Spring-Summer, 2021

Food and Drink - Modern Period - Libya, in Encyclopedia of Jews in the Modern World Online, ed. Norman A. Stillman, Brill, 2019

Life Interrupted : Interviews with Jews of Libyan Origin, in Jewish Libya: Memory and Identity in Text and Image, eds. Jacques Roumani, David Meghnagi, and Judith Roumani, Syracuse University Press, 2018

Jews in Libya, Encyclopedia of the Jewish Diaspora, Vol. 2 (Countries, Regions, and Communities), M. A. Ehrlich, Ed., ABC-CLIO, 2009, pp. 477–481.

Libya, in Avotaynu Guide to Jewish Genealogy, ed. S. A. Sack and G. Mokotoff,, Avotaynu, Bergenfield, NJ, 2004.

Introduction, Jewish Women From Muslim Societies Speak, Brandeis Univ. Hadassah International Research Institute on Jewish Women and American Sephardi Federation, 2003.

Using Procite for Creating Special Collections Databases and Reserve Reading Lists at the University of California (with R. Brandt and R. J. Heckart), Pro-Cite in Libraries: Applications in Bibliographic Database Management, Deb Renee Biggs, Ed., Medford, NJ: Learned Information, Inc (1995): 113-121.

Data for GIS: The essential ingredient, in Nancy L. Blair, Ed., Proceedings of the Geoscience Information Society, 1995, pp. 31– 38 (publ. 1996)

The Image of Libraries and Librarians: Is It Changing? (With Julia Wooldridge) Public Library Quarterly 6 (4): 55- 63 (1985)
