= Year Up =

American nonprofit organization

Year Up United
- Established: 2000; 26 years ago
- Founder: Gerald Chertavian
- Type: 501(c)(3) Nonprofit
- Legal status: 501(c)(3)
- Headquarters: Boston
- Location: United States
- Key people: Ellen McClain (CEO & President)
- Revenue: $179.3 million (2022)
- Students: 4,000 (2022)
- Website: yearup.org

Year Up United is an American nonprofit organization focused on education and job skills. The organization provides students without a 4- year bachelor's degree with resources, training and corporate internships with the aim of improving their job prospects and social mobility.

== History ==
The organization was founded in Boston in 2000 by Gerald Chertavian, who worked as a banker on Wall Street and later co-founded a software company.

In June 2002, Year Up United's first class of students graduated its one-year program. The program had started in Boston in 2001 with 22 students.

In 2011, Year Up United established a Puget Sound program, based in downtown Seattle. It opened a program in Phoenix in 2014.

As of 2020, the organization worked with more than 250 companies that provided funding for the program and took on interns.

In 2021, the Office of Planning, Research, and Evaluation in the US Department of Health and Human Services (OPRE) published a report of a study it had sponsored, evaluating Year Up United's longer-term impact via a five-year randomized controlled trial. The study found that the Year Up United program had a statistically significant impact on earnings. In 2022, the OPRE reported that six years after completing the Year Up United program, past participants had an income 30% higher than a control group of non-participants.

As of 2022, approximately 4,000 students per year participated in Year Up United's programs.

In September 2024, the organization changed their name to Year Up United. They were also shown in a Netflix documentary, Untapped: Closing America's Opportunity Gap, which released in October 2024.

== Programs ==
Year Up United's program includes job skills training and internships in a corporate environment, for underserved students who have a high school diploma or equivalent, but have not received a college degree. As of 2024, the program was aimed at young people and accepted participants aged between 18 and 29 years old.

The organization also runs a program providing materials and resources to other training providers working with students, including community colleges.

== Funding and partnerships ==
The majority of funding for Year Up United is provided by its corporate partners. Additional funding is provided by sponsorships, donations and public funding, the latter of which represented 2% of the organization's budget as of 2018. In 2022, Google announced it was working with Year Up United and two other job training programs to provide funding and course content. Also in 2022, Year Up United received a grant of $3 million from the private equity firm Blackstone Inc.
