= NPower (United States) =

Nonprofit organization in the United States

NPower is a national nonprofit 501(c)(3) organization that is on a mission to empower young adults and military connected individuals to thrive in the digital economy through transformative IT Information Technologytraining, creating pathways to economic prosperity.

Founded in 1999 in New York City, NPower currently operates in New York City, New Jersey (Newark), Maryland (Baltimore), Missouri (St. Louis), Michigan (Detroit), Texas (Dallas, San Antonio, Houston), California (San Francisco Bay Area), North Carolina (Raleigh), Ohio (Dayton). To date, it has served over 10,000 individuals.

== Programs ==
The NPower signature training model includes:

Tech Fundamentals – A 20-week program consisting of instructor-led virtual training with an opportunity to earn industry-recognized certifications: CompTIA A+ & IT Fundamentals+, a Google IT Support Certificate, and an IT Generalist Apprenticeship credential*. Coursework focuses on basic Information Technology (IT) competencies for entry-level tech employment.Program provides mentoring from senior-level IT professionals and job placement assistance with access to a wide range of top employers

NPower also offers App Development which covers coding, UI/UX Fundamentals, and Generative AI exposure and Networking and Systems Administration which involves managing and optimizing the devices, systems, and connections within a network to ensure seamless data access and communication programs.

Advanced Programs – Multiple paths for advanced IT coursework and certification including Cybersecurity and Cloud Computing.

NPower is also a Department of Defense SkillBridge and Army Career Skills Program (CSP) provider. And provides cybersecurity training to active-duty military personnel within 180 days of separation from the military.

NPower provides a range of social service support (housing referrals, technology equipment, clothing donations, travel assistance, etc.) to students during their tenure in the program.

== Leadership ==
Bertina Ceccarelli is NPower's current CEO. She joined the organization in May 2016.

NPower's current board chairperson is Matt Horner, Executive Vice President of Global Enterprise Sales at World Wide Technology.

NPower’s National Advisory Council includes executive volunteers who support and guide innovative ways to anticipate future trends in NPower’s programs and curriculum.

Each NPower region maintains a regional advisory board of esteemed technology executives from around the country.

== History ==
NPower was founded in 1999 in partnership with Microsoft, JPMorgan Chase, and Accenture, with the original goal of providing tech support for nonprofits. In 2002, it began its first training programs out of New York, which have evolved into national program offerings.

- 2000 - NPower is founded with the mission of deploying trained tech support to nonprofits in New York.
- 2002 - NPower launches its first core training program for young adults in New York, later relocating to Brooklyn.
- 2011 - NPower New York opens a second location in Harlem.
- 2013 - NPower Texas opens in Dallas and launches its first program for military veterans.
- 2014 - NPower California opens in the San Francisco Bay Area to serve veterans. NPower Canada opens in Toronto to serve young adults.
- 2015 - NPower New Jersey opens to serve young adults and veterans.
- 2016 - NPower Maryland opens in Baltimore to serve young adults.
- 2017 - NPower Missouri opens in St. Louis to serve young adults.
- 2019 - NPower New Jersey opens Newark location. NPower Michigan opens first location in Detroit to serve young adults. NPower Maryland expands to West Baltimore. NPower Missouri expands to North St. Louis.
- 2020 - In response to the COVID-19 global pandemic, NPower adapts its programs to virtual training.

== Events and fundraisers ==
NPower hosts an annual fundraising gala each fall. Other events include regional graduations each spring and fall.
