= LionTree =

American investment and merchant banking firm

LionTree LLC
- Type: Private
- Industry: Financial services
- Founded: 2012; 14 years ago
- Founders: Aryeh Bourkoff; Ehren Stenzler
- Headquarters: 745 Fifth Avenue, New York, U.S.
- Area served: Worldwide
- Key people: Aryeh Bourkoff (CEO)
- Products: Investment banking Merchant banking
- Number of employees: 100
- Website: www.liontree.com

LionTree LLC is an American boutique investment and merchant bank that has a focus on industries related to technology, media and telecommunications (TMT). Although the firm is based in the United States, it also has a significant presence in Europe. LionTree also has a media company called Kindred Media.

== History ==
LionTree was founded in June 2012 by Aryeh Bourkoff, former head of UBS's investment banking in the Americas, alongside fellow UBS alum, Ehren Stenzler who joined in July 2012.

In 2016, LionTree opened additional offices in San Francisco and London. In 2017, an office in Paris was opened.

During the same year, LionTree founded Ocelot Partners, a special-purpose acquisition company that focuses on investment opportunities in the European TMT sector, along with Andrew Barron and Martin E. Franklin. In March 2018, Ocelot Partners acquired Ocean Outdoor, a U.K.-based digital billboard company, from Searchlight Capital.

In 2017, LionTree started its own media company, Kindred Media which produces the KindredCast podcast.

On June 16, 2022, the University of California, San Diego renamed the RIMAC Arena to Liontree Arena after Liontree donated $5 million for scholar-athletes.

== Business overview ==
=== LionTree Advisors ===
The investment banking unit is called LionTree Advisors and provides services such as mergers and acquisitions, capital raisings, and initial public offerings.

Notable deals LionTree was involved in include:

- CK Hutchison's acquisition of Italian mobile operator, Wind Tre,
- Verizon's acquisition of AOL and Yahoo!,
- The 2019 merger of CBS and Viacom,
- Amazon's acquisition of MGM studios,
- Take-Two Interactive's acquisition of Zynga
- New York Times acquisition of The Athletic.

=== LionTree Partners ===
LionTree Partners acts as the investment arm of Liontree. It mainly invests in companies from the TMT sector. Notable investments include Astra, Fanatics, Inc. and FuboTV.
