= Frazier Healthcare Partners =

Healthcare private equity and venture capital firm

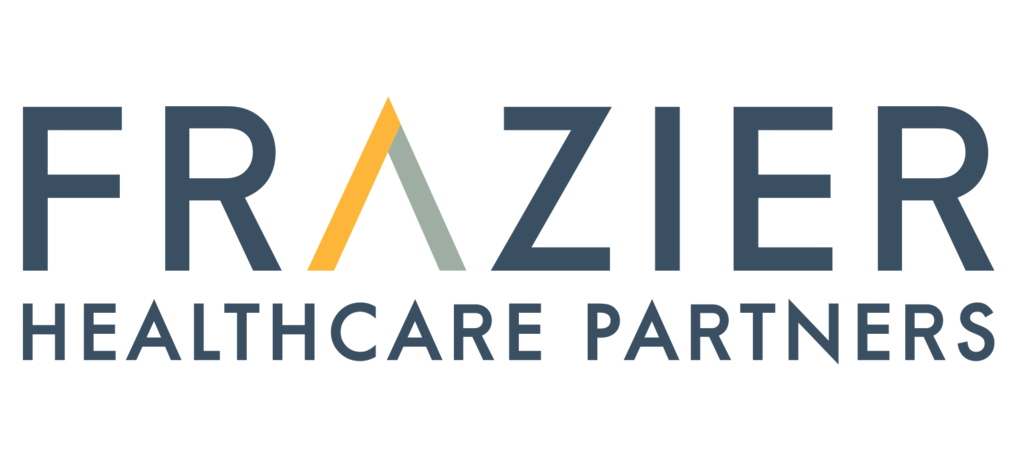
- Company type: Private
- Industry: Private equity
- Founded: 1991
- Founder: Alan D. Frazier
- Headquarters: Two Union Square, Seattle, WA, United States
- Key people: Alan D. Frazier (Chairman)
- Products: Leveraged buyouts; Growth capital; Venture capital
- AUM: US$5.2 billion (2023)
- Website: frazierhealthcare.com

Frazier Healthcare Partners is a healthcare private equity and venture capital firm based in Seattle, Washington with offices in New York City and Menlo Park that invests across the U.S., Canada and Europe. The firm specializes in leveraged buyouts, growth equity and venture capital financing.

== Background ==
Frazier Healthcare Partners was founded by Alan D. Frazier in 1991. With over $11 billion total capital raised, the firm has invested in over 200 companies and currently manages a portfolio of approximately 40 companies across healthcare services and life sciences sectors.

The firm’s Growth Buyout fund invests in healthcare and pharmaceutical services, medical products and related sectors. The Life Sciences fund invests in therapeutics and related areas that are addressing unmet medical needs through innovation.

In 2024, the investment firm closed its 11th dedicated healthcare fund focused on middle market companies, which was oversubscribed and hit its hard cap of $2.3 billion in total capital commitments.
