= LaunchCode =

Organization in Missouri, US

- Industry: Information Technology
- Headquarters: St. Louis, Missouri, USA
- Key people: Jeff Mazur (Current Executive Director); Jim McKelvey (Co-Founder & Director); Robin Carnahan (Director); Brendan Lind (Co-Founder and Founding Executive Director)
- Website: www.launchcode.org

LaunchCode is a non-profit organization headquartered in St. Louis, Missouri. Founded in 2013 by Jim McKelvey, it aims to help people enter the technology field by providing free and accessible education, training, and paid apprenticeship placements, including training veterans and those in prison. It has locations in Kansas City and Philadelphia.

In 2020, 60% of LaunchCode students identified as women or non-binary, 49% identified as people of color, 19% identified as LGBTQIA+, and 46% did not have a 4-year degree.

The company also offers the LaunchCode MoonShot Challenge award.
