= SP Plus Corporation =

American parking company

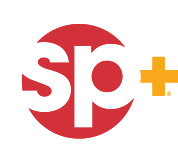
- Formerly: Standard Parking Corporation
- Type: Private
- Industry: Parking
- Founded: 1929 (Standard), 1947 (APCOA)
- Fate: Acquired by Metropolis Technologies
- Headquarters: Aon Center; Chicago, Illinois, United States
- Number of employees: 26,000
- Parent: Metropolis Technologies, Inc.

SP Plus Corporation is an American provider of parking facility management services. It is a provider of parking, baggage handling, ground transportation, facility maintenance, event logistics, and security services across the United States and Canada. Until December 2013, it was known as Standard Parking Corporation.

The company employs more than 26,000 people to manage 4,200 parking facility locations, as well as parking and shuttle bus operations at 75 airports. It is wholly owned by Metropolis Technologies, Inc.

== History ==
Standard Parking began in 1929 in Chicago, Illinois, where it was operated by David and Benjamin Warshauer as a family owned and controlled business. The business operated under the corporate name of Standard Parking Corporation from 1981 until 1995, at which time it was reconstituted as a limited partnership named Standard Parking, L.P. March 1998, Standard Parking merged with APCOA, Inc., forming APCOA/Standard Parking, Inc.

In April 2003, APCOA/Standard Parking, Inc. changed its corporate name to Standard Parking Corporation. In June 2004, Standard Parking completed its initial public offering, listing on the Nasdaq under the symbol STAN, and raising $54 million in gross proceeds from the offering.

In July 2009, Standard Parking acquired the assets of Gameday Management Group, which plans the operation of transportation and parking systems, primarily for major stadium and sporting events and whose Click and Park service offers traffic demand management and pre-paid parking services. In October 2012, Standard Parking completed the acquisition of Central Parking, effectively doubling the size of the company.

In December 2013, the company rebranded to SP Plus Corporation and changed its NASDAQ ticker symbol to SP.

In October 2023, Metropolis Technologies, an artificial intelligence company founded by Alex Israel that uses computer vision to enable checkout-free payment, agreed to acquire SP Plus Corporation for $1.5 billion. Metropolis completed the acquisition on May 16, 2024, taking SP Plus private. With the completion of the transaction, SP Plus shares no longer trade on the Nasdaq Global Select Market. The company continues to operate as a founder-led and founder-controlled, private company. Metropolis CEO Alex Israel stated that the acquisition will allow Metropolis to expand its reach in the North American market.

== See also ==
- APCOA Parking
