= Pancreatic cyst =

Fluid-filled growth in the pancreas

- Specialty: Gastroenterology
- Symptoms: Usually asymptomatic. In some cases abdominal pain, jaundice, weight loss
- Complications: Pancreatitis, pancreatic cancer
- Treatment: Surgical resection for high risk cysts

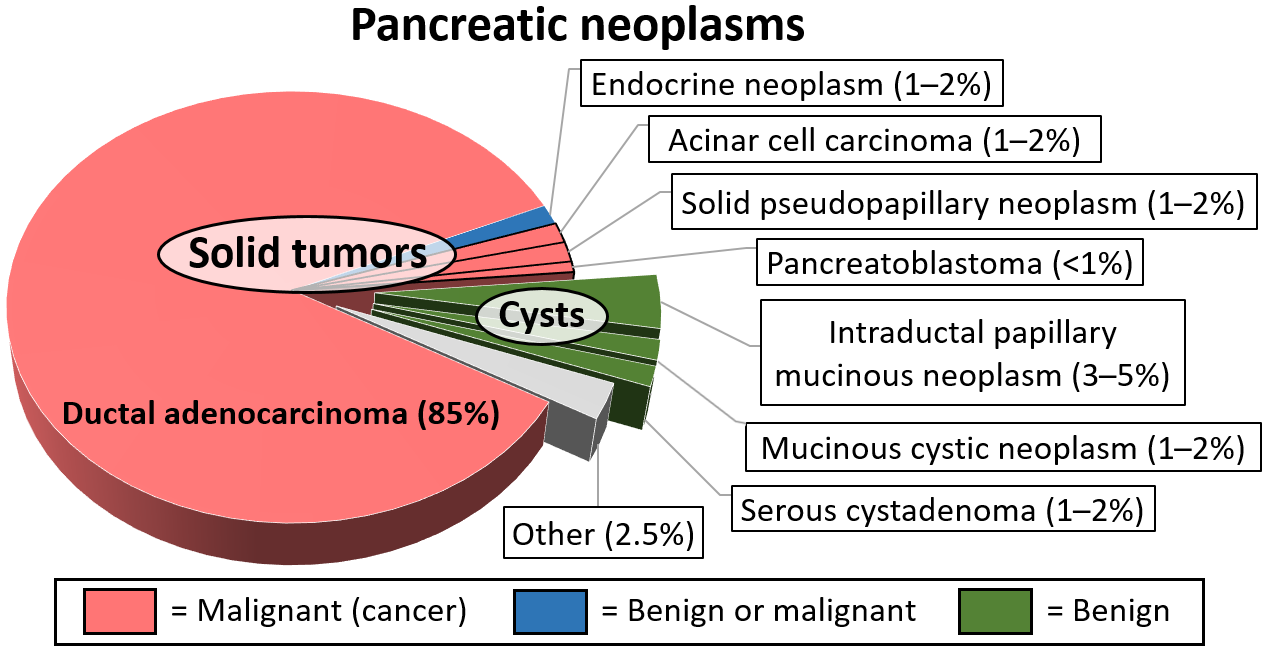
Relative incidences of various pancreatic neoplasms, with cysts annotated at center right. Also, non-neoplastic cysts include pseudocyst, retention cyst, benign epithelial cysts, lymphoepithelial cysts, squamous lined cysts (dermoid cyst and epidermal cyst in intrapancreatic accessory spleen), mucinous nonneoplastic cysts, and lymphangiomas.

A pancreatic cyst is a fluid-filled sac within the pancreas. The prevalence of pancreatic cysts is 2-15% based on imaging studies, but the prevalence may be as high as 50% based on autopsy series. Most pancreatic cysts are benign and the risk of malignancy (pancreatic cancer) is 0.5-1.5%. Pancreatic pseudocysts and serous cystadenomas (which collectively account for 15-25% of all pancreatic cysts) are considered benign pancreatic cysts with a risk of malignancy of 0%.

Causes range from benign to malignant. Pancreatic cysts can occur in the setting of pancreatitis, though they are only reliably diagnosed 6 weeks after the episode of acute pancreatitis.

Main branch intraductal papillary mucinous neoplasms (IPMNs) are associated with dilatation of the main pancreatic duct, while side branch IPMNs are not associated with dilatation. MRCP can help distinguish the position of the cysts relative to the pancreatic duct, and direct appropriate treatment and follow-up. The most common malignancy that can present as a pancreatic cyst is a mucinous cystic neoplasm.

== Diagnosis ==
Pancreatic cysts are usually seen incidentally when medical imaging is obtained for other purposes and they are usually asymptomatic. Pancreatic cysts may sometimes be definitively diagnosed based on imaging findings from an MRI or CT scan with contrast. However, sometimes additional imaging is required, such as an endoscopic ultrasound with or without fine needle aspiration or magnetic resonance cholangiopancreatography (MRCP). EUS has a higher accuracy in diagnosing high risk radiographic features of pancreatic cysts compared to MRI, especially if contrast enhancement is also used. Based on imaging, cysts that cause biliary obstruction, dilation of the main pancreatic duct greater than 10 mm, have a mass in their walls greater than 5 mm are considered high risk features and are associated with a 56-89% risk of cancer. Cyst size greater than 3 cm, main pancreatic duct dilation of 5–10 mm, or a change in caliber or a narrowing of the main pancreatic duct with atrophy of the duct distally, presence of lymph node swelling, thickened or enhancing cyst walls, or an increase in cyst size over a year are considered intermediate risk imaging findings for cancer.

Lab workup and other clinical findings can also be used to assess malignant risk of pancreatic cysts. An elevation in the biomarker CA19-9, new onset diabetes, pancreatitis, abdominal pain or weight loss are all considered high risk features, with the presence of jaundice being a very high risk feature.

Cytologic analysis of the cystic fluid can help distinguish what type of pancreatic cyst is present, but it is not helpful in grading. However, cytologic fluid analysis by fine needle aspiration has low specificity as most samples contain only fluid without specific cell types. Elevated levels of amylase in the fluid suggest communication with the pancreatic duct, which is indicative of a pseudocyst or IPMN. Increased levels of carcinoembryonic antigen (CEA) are indicative of mucinous cysts in 75% of cases, and very low levels of CEA effectively rule out mucinous cysts. And reduced glucose levels in the cyst fluid is useful in differentiating (with an approximate sensitivity of 90% and specificity of 85% at a cutoff of 50 mg/dL) between mucinous and non-mucinous cysts, with mucinous cysts having a low glucose level and non-mucinous cysts having a high glucose level.

DNA analysis of the cystic fluid may aid in the diagnosis of pancreatic cysts, but yields are variable, between 25 and 50%. VHL tumor suppressor gene mutations (associated with Von Hippel-Lindau disease) are associated with simple cysts, serous cystadenomas and less commonly pancreatic neuroendocrine tumors. KRAS mutations are associated with mucinous cysts, GNAS mutations are associated with IPMNs, CTNNB1 mutations are associated with solid pseudopapillary tumours.

== Types ==
Pancreatic pseudocysts are benign, with a risk of malignant progression of 0%. Pseudocysts are associated with acute or chronic pancreatitis and the cysts usually commnicate with the main pancreatic duct. They usually resolve spontaneously and are unilocular (not septated; i.e. do not have walls separating parts of the cyst) and may be solitary or multiple.

Serous cystadenomas are benign as well, with a risk of malignant potential of 0% and they usually present in the 5-7th decade of life with 60% of instances being in women. They do not communicate with the main pancreatic duct. Their imaging characteristics vary and have been described as muti-cystic with a honeycomb appearance, with less common variants being solid, macrocystic or unilocular. Serous systadenomas may have a central scar in the cyst seen on CT or MRI, and this is characteristic of the type, but is only seen in 30% of cases.

Intraductal papillary mucinous neoplasms (IPMN) involve the main pancreatic duct (main ductal IPMN) or its branches (branch duct IPMN) or both (mixed type IPMN). IPMNs are pre-malignant with main duct IPMNs having a 33-85% malignant potential and branch duct IPMNs having a 15% risk of malignancy at 15 years. IPMNs usually occur during the 5-th decade of life and have an equal male and female incidence. They may present as solitary or multiple lesions, and they may cause pancreatitis as the pancreatic duct is blocked by mucin.

Pancreatic mucinous cystic neoplasm usually involve the tail of the pancreas and 90% of cases involve women and they usually present in the 4-6th decade of life. They have a malignant potential of 10-34%. They do not communicate with the pancreatic ducts and they usually present as single, thick walled, non-loculated (having a single chamber) lesions. They characteristically contain ovarian type stromal cells.

Pancreatic neuroendocrine tumors may sometimes undergo cystic degeneration forming cysts. These types of tumors arise from pancreatic endocrine cells, and 10% are functional, being able to secrete hormones. They are characterized on imaging by their thick walls. 80% of these tumors express somatostatin receptors thus allowing them to be visualized on Gallium DOTA scans.

== Follow up guidelines ==
Cysts from 1–5 mm on CT or ultrasound are typically too small to characterize and considered benign. No further imaging follow-up is recommended for these lesions. Cysts from 6–9 mm require a single follow-up in 2–3 years, preferably with magnetic resonance cholangiopancreatography (MRCP) to better evaluate the pancreatic duct. If stable at follow-up, no further imaging follow-up is recommended. For cysts from 1–1.9 cm follow-up is suggested with MRCP or multiphasic CT in 1–2 years. If stable at follow-up, the interval of imaging follow-up is increased to 2–3 years. Cysts from 2–2.9 cm have more malignant potential, and a baseline endoscopic ultrasound is suggested, followed by MRCP or multiphasic CT in 6–12 months. If patients are young, surgery may be considered to avoid the need for prolonged surveillance. If these cysts are stable at follow-up, interval imaging follow-up can be done in 1–2 years.
