= Intraductal papillary mucinous neoplasm =

- Other names: IPMN
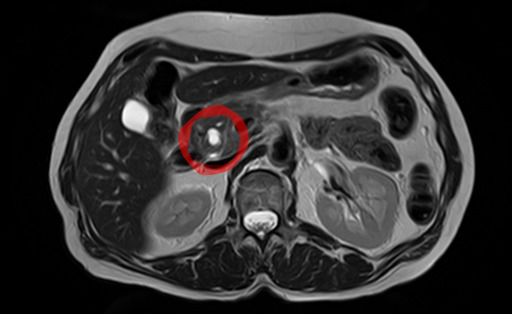
- Intraductal papillary mucinous neoplasm in magnetic resonance imaging.
- Specialty: Gastroenterology
- Symptoms: Usually asymptomatic
- Usual onset: 50-70 years of age
- Types: Main duct, branch duct or mixed
- Risk factors: Male gender
- Differential diagnosis: Mucinous cystic neoplasm
- Treatment: Imaging surveillance, surgical resection

Intraductal papillary mucinous neoplasm (IPMN) is a type of tumor that can occur within the cells of the pancreatic duct. IPMN tumors produce mucus, and this mucus can form pancreatic cysts. Although intraductal papillary mucinous neoplasms are benign tumors, they can progress to pancreatic cancer. As such IPMN is viewed as a precancerous condition. Once an intraductal papillary mucinous neoplasm has been found, the management options include close monitoring and pre-emptive surgery.

== Histology ==
IPMNs are lined with mucin-secreting columnar epithelium.

== Diagnosis ==
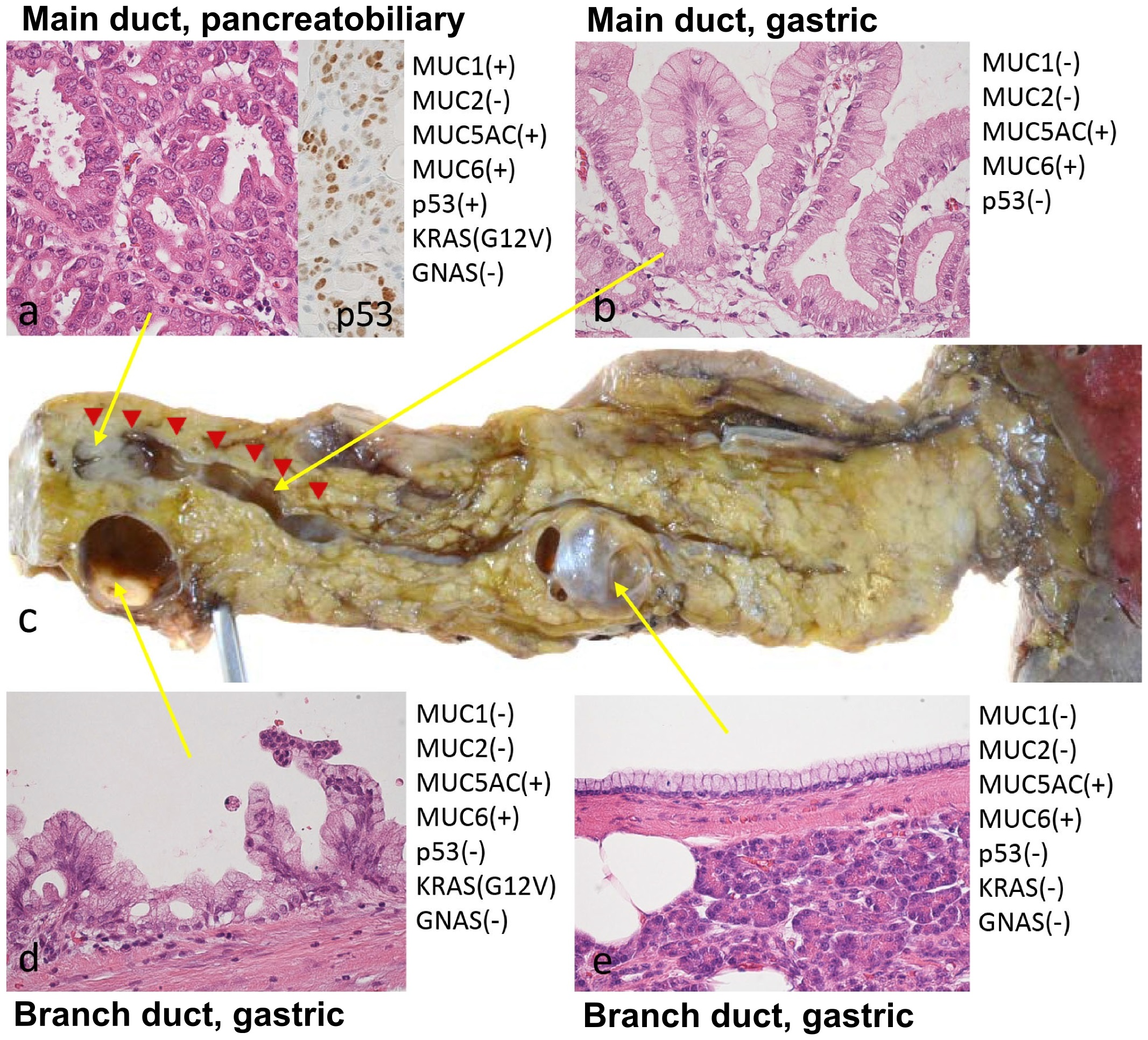
Histopathology of IPMN types in a distal pancreatectomy specimen from a 60-year-old man, by gross pathology (center image), microscopy and immunohistochemistry: The resected specimen (c) revealed that the mural nodule in the MPD consisted of PB-type IPMN with high-grade dysplasia (adenocarcinoma) (a) with a diffuse positivity of p53 immunostaining (an insert) and KRAS mutation (G12V). The BD-IPMN of the body was lined by gastric mucinous epithelium showing low papillary configuration with mild epithelial stratification with the same KRAS mutation (d), and the proliferation of similar gastric IPMN components sequentially involved the bottom of the mural nodule and the wall of the surrounding dilated MPD (indicated by red arrowheads) (b). The BD-IPMN of the tail was lined by flat, monolayer gastric mucinous epithelium lacking cellular atypia and KRAS mutation (e).

In most cases, IPMNs are diagnosed based on clinical and radiographic criteria. If fluid from the cyst is aspirated, the CEA level is typically elevated. Confirmation of the diagnosis with tissue is rarely necessary.

By histopathology, IPMN is characterized on light microscopy by Mucinous epithelial cells, and growth within the pancreatic ducts. Mucin 5AC is a useful immunohistochemistry marker. Characteristic genetic alterations are those of KRAS and GNAS.

Further subtyping of IPMN can be done as either:

- Gross pathology: Main duct, branch duct, and mixed duct lesions, which determines surgical management. Main duct lesion is the segmental or diffuse dilatation of main pancreatic duct greater than 5 mm without other causes of obstruction. Meanwhile, branch duct lesion is the pancreatic cyst more than 5 mm that communicates with the main duct. The mixed duct lesions fulfills both criteria above.
- By light microscopy and immunohistochemistry: Gastric, intestinal, pancreaticbiliary, and oncocytic.

== Treatment ==
The treatment of choice for main-duct IPMNs is resection due to approximately 50% chance of malignancy. Side-branch IPMNs are occasionally monitored with regular CT or MRIs, but most are eventually resected, with a 30% rate of malignancy in these resected tumors. Indications for surgical resection include obstructive jaundice, an enhancing mural nodule >5 mm, and pancreatic duct dilation (>10 mm).

Surgery can include the removal of the head of the pancreas (a pancreaticoduodenectomy), removal of the body and tail of the pancreas (a distal pancreatectomy), or rarely removal of the entire pancreas (a total pancreatectomy). In selected cases the surgery can be performed using minimally invasive techniques such as laparoscopy or robotic surgery. A study using Surveillance, Epidemiology, and End Results Registry (SEER) data suggested that increased lymph node counts harvested during the surgery were associated with better survival in invasive IPMN patients.

== Prognosis ==
Survival 5 years after resection of an IPMN without malignancy is approximately 80%, 85% with malignancy but no lymph node spread and 0% with malignancy spreading to lymph nodes.

== Epidemiology ==
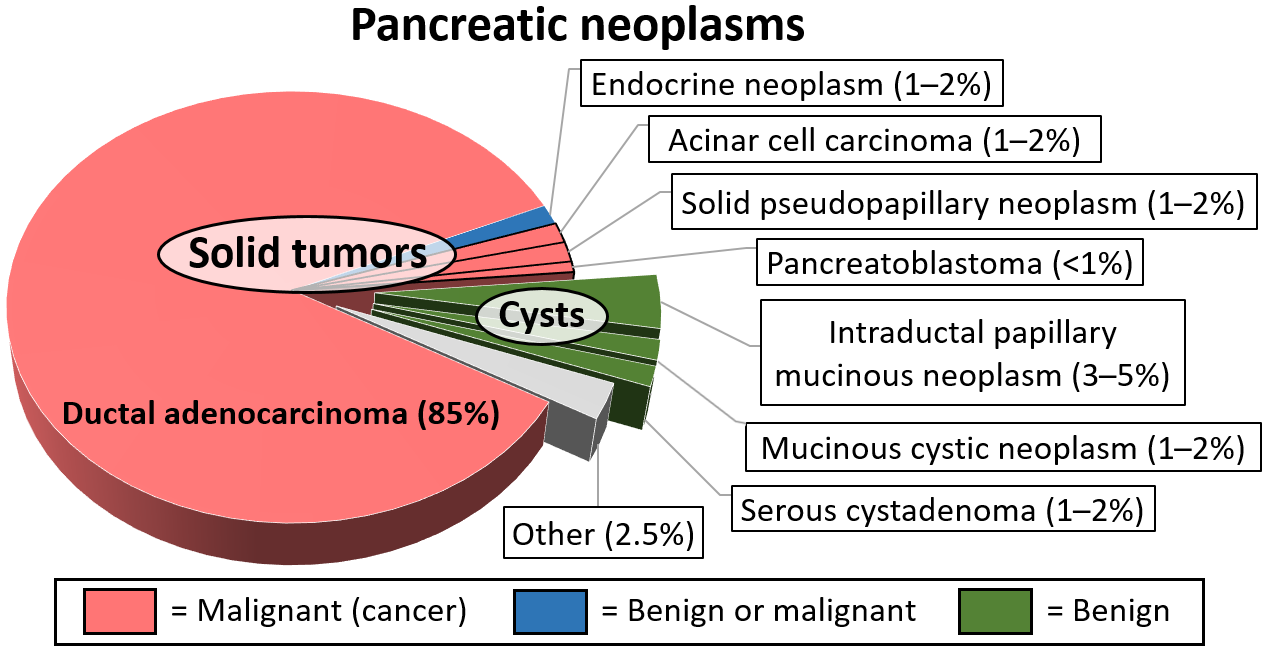
Relative incidences of various pancreatic neoplasms, with intraductal papillary mucinous neoplasm annotated at center right.

Side branch IPMNs are the most common pancreatic cysts. IPMNs occur more often in men than women, and often occur in the 6th and 7th decade of life.

== History ==
In 1982, IPMN was reported as a "mucin-producing tumor" by Kazuhiko Ohashi of the Japanese Foundation for Cancer Research.

== See also ==
- Intra-ampullary papillary–tubular neoplasm
- Pancreatic serous cystadenoma
- Solid pseudopapillary neoplasm
