= Cystic lesions of the pancreas =

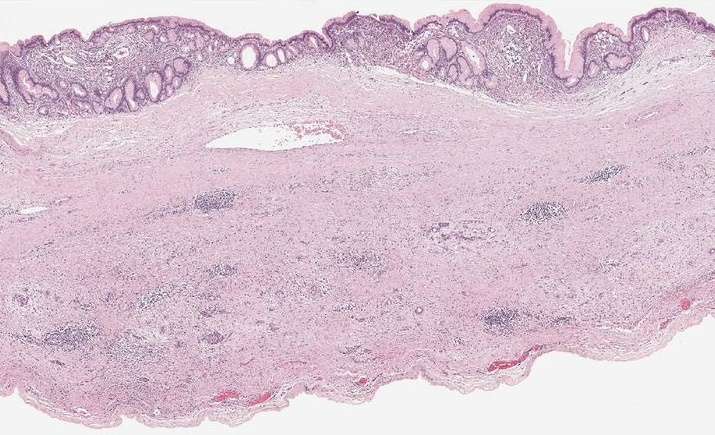
- Mucinous cystadenoma of the pancreas 6

Cystic lesions of the pancreas are a group of pancreatic lesions characterized by a cystic appearance. They can be benign or malignant.

Cystic lesions are found in 20.6% of all pancreatectomy specimens. Among this heterogeneous group, benign neoplasms predominate, particularly those with mucinous lining. Age at presentation, gender, location and tumor size are highly variable, with the exception of solid pseudopapillary tumor.

== Types ==
- Pancreatic intraductal papillary mucinous tumors (most common diagnosis - 52.6%)
- Pancreatic serous cystic tumors (20.6%)
  - Pancreatic serous cystadenoma
  - Pancreatic serous cystadenocarcinoma
- Pancreatic mucinous cystic tumors (13.4%)
  - Pancreatic mucinous cystadenoma
  - Pancreatic mucinous cystadenocarcinoma
