= Pancreatic mucinous cystadenoma =

Pancreatic mucinous cystadenoma is a tumour of pancreas. It may be benign or be associated with an invasive carcinoma component.

== Pathology ==
=== Microscopy ===
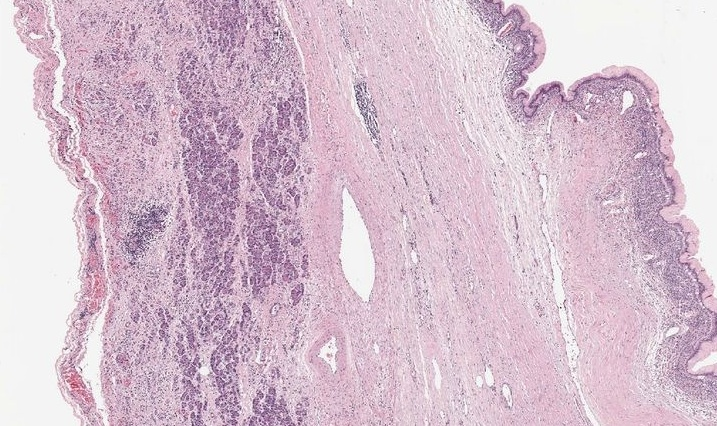
Mucinous cystadenoma of the pancreas

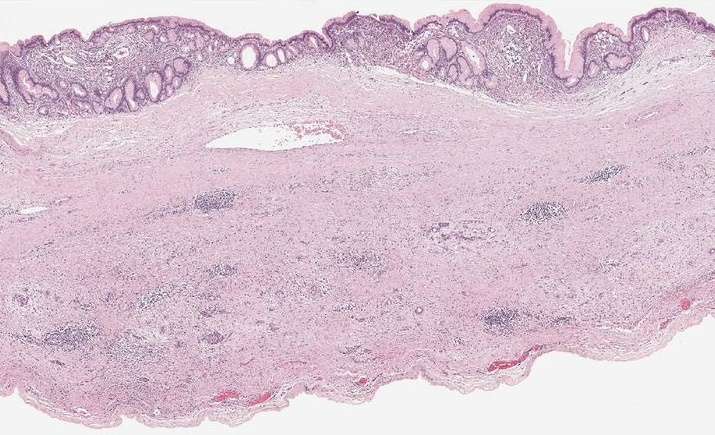
Mucinous cystadenoma of the pancreas

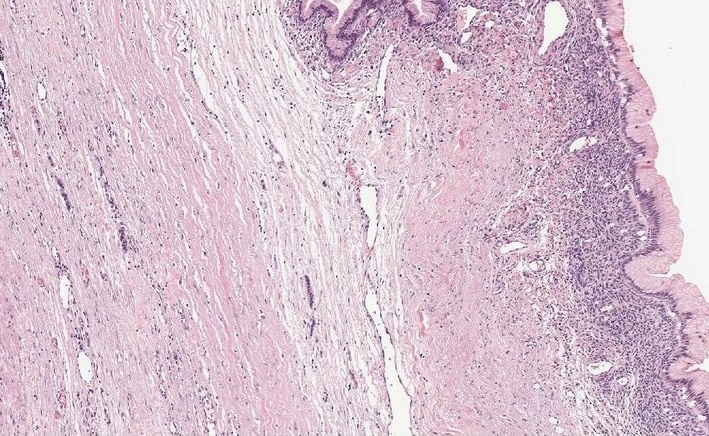
Mucinous cystadenoma of the pancreas

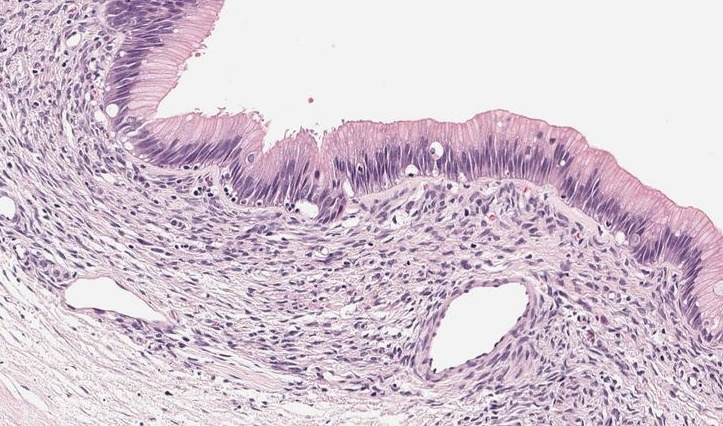
Mucinous cystadenoma of the pancreas

== See also ==
- Mucinous cystadenoma
- Pancreatic cysts
- Pancreatic serous cystadenoma
