= IAPN =

IAPN may stand for:

- Independent American Party of Nevada
- International Association of Professional Numismatists
- Intra-ampullary papillary–tubular neoplasm
