= Pancreatectomy =

Surgical removal of all or part of the pancreas

In medicine, a pancreatectomy is the surgical removal of all or part of the pancreas. Several types of pancreatectomies exist, including pancreaticoduodenectomy (Whipple procedure), distal pancreatectomy, segmental pancreatectomy, and total pancreatectomy.

== History ==
Pancreatic surgeries have been reported as early as the 1800s, however the first successful complete pancreatectomy was reported in 1944. Surgery on the pancreas is complex, at times requiring both the resection, or removal of parts or the entire organ, as well as anastomosis, or the connection of different parts of the digestive system. Advances in technology have allowed for the improvement in outcomes, reduction of complications, and improvement in surgical techniques.

== Pancreatic anatomy and function ==
Pancreas and surrounding structures.

The pancreas is a digestive and endocrine organ that serves as a gland. It releases endocrine and exocrine hormones to help with metabolism and digestion.

The pancreas is located behind the stomach. It is divided into the head, neck, body and tail. Some people have a fifth part of the pancreas known as the uncinate process. The pancreas contains a main pancreatic duct where the exocrine molecules collect and then drain into the duodenum via the common bile duct. There is also an accessory pancreatic duct that drains above the main duct straight into the duodenum.

Blood supply to the pancreas comes from the celiac artery and the superior mesenteric artery, branches of the aorta.

=== Exocrine function ===
The pancreas releases digestive enzymes into the gastrointestinal tract via the pancreatic ducts. These enzymes make it possible to break down food and materials in the small intestine allowing nutritional molecules to be absorbed. The enzymes include trypsin and chymotrypsin which help digest proteins, amylase which breaks down carbohydrates, as well as lipase which breaks down fats. The pancreas has majority exocrine function.

=== Endocrine function ===
The pancreas is also made up of areas of cells known as pancreatic islets which include alpha, beta, and delta cells. Alpha cells secrete glucagon, beta cells secrete insulin, and delta cells secrete somatostatin, all of which are important hormones for metabolism. The endocrine function of the pancreatic glands is only 1-2% of pancreatic function.

== Indications ==
Pancreatectomies may be performed for a variety of reasons, including:

- Inflammation
  - Necrotizing pancreatitis
  - Chronic pancreatitis
- Trauma
- Neoplasms (Tumors)
  - Adenocarcinoma (85%)
  - Cystadenoma (mucinous/serous)
  - Cystadenocarcinoma
  - Islet cell tumors (neuroendocrine tumors)
  - Papillary cystic neoplasms
  - Lymphoma
  - Acinar cell tumors
- Severe hyperinsulinemic hypoglycemia

== Types of Pancreatic Surgery ==
Pancreatectomy
- Diagram showing the area removed for a total pancreatectomy
- ICD-9-CM: 52.5-52.6
- MeSH: D010180
- OPS-301 code: 5-524-5-525

The most common surgical procedure involving removal of a portion of the pancreas is called a pancreaticoduodenectomy.

Diagram showing how the bowel is joined back together after a total pancreatectomy

A distal pancreatectomy is removal of the body and/or tail of the pancreas. It is considered the standard procedure for cancer lesions found in the body or tail of the pancreas. The surgery is considered safe, with low morbidity and mortality, with the exception of in the case of pancreatic adenocarcinomas, a type of cancer that has a poor prognosis. Both open and laparoscopic techniques have been used for this type of surgery. Robot-assisted pancreatectomy also offers benefits in the morbidity and mortality.

A segmental pancreatectomy is used to remove part of the pancreas so that there is not an excess of loss of pancreatic tissue. It is used in instances of benign or low-grade tumors of the pancreatic neck and body. A study by Du et al. published in 2013 showed decreased intraoperative hemorrhage and risk of post-operative diabetes, however, there was an increase in pancreatic fistula rate in patients that underwent a middle segmental pancreatectomy.

A total pancreatectomy is the complete removal of the pancreas. It is a surgery used to remove the entire pancreas for issues such as chronic pancreatitis or advanced pancreatic cancers if non-surgical techniques do not work. This surgery is known to have disadvantages, however, over the years, surgical techniques as well as the surgical outcomes have improved. Total removal of the pancreas can lead to an insufficiency of hormones produced.

In total pancreatectomy, the gallbladder, distal stomach, a portion of the small intestine, associated lymph nodes and in certain cases the spleen are removed in addition to the entire pancreas.

TP-IAT (total pancreatectomy with islet autotransplantation) has also gained respectable traction within the medical community. These procedures are used in the management of several conditions involving the pancreas, such as benign pancreatic tumors, pancreatic cancer, and pancreatitis. TP-IAT is used to prevent post-operative diabetes and the subsequent complications. The islet cells are isolated from the explanted pancreas into the portal vein in order to help mitigate the loss of endocrine function following total pancreatectomy.

== Contraindications ==
Reasons why patients should not receive a specific treatment to the disease/illness are known as contraindications. Contraindications to pancreatectomies include a patient's other medical history or comorbidities, poor functional status of the patient, and/or bleeding issues. Contraindications to pancreatectomy also can vary by type. In distal pancreatectomies, lesions that are not fully able to be removed are considered contraindications.

== Complications ==
Among the common complications of complete or nearly complete pancreatectomy are deficiencies of pancreatic endocrine or exocrine function, requiring replacement of insulin or digestive enzymes. Patients can develop type 1 diabetes after pancreatectomy and a study by Kim et al. determined that patients with BMIs >25 kg/m^{2} had higher incidences of pancreatic diabetes after distal pancreatectomy. Type 1 diabetes can be treated with careful blood glucose monitoring and insulin therapy.

Complications also include fistulas, or the formation of an abnormal connection between two organs, and pancreatic leakage, where digestive enzymes can leak through the formation of the fistulas. Treatment for pancreatic leaks after surgery can include stenting and occlusion of the pancreatic duct, the use of octreotide, a drug that mimics somatostatin which inhibits secretion from the pancreas, or two other types of surgeries that remove part of the stomach or small intestine along with the pancreas.

== Prognosis ==
After a total pancreatectomy, the body no longer produces its own insulin or pancreatic enzymes, so patients have to take insulin and enzyme supplements. Those who were not already diabetic become so (type 3c diabetes). Glycemic control is challenging even for relatively young and healthy apancreatic people, owing to the digestive challenges of not having endogenous insulin and pancreatic enzymes under autonomic control. It can be challenging depending on age and comorbidities. But overall, quality of life in patients after total pancreatectomy is comparable with quality of life in patients who undergo a partial pancreatic resection.

== See also ==
- List of surgeries by type
