= Mucinous cystic neoplasm =

Type of abnormal tissue

A mucinous cystic neoplasm is an abnormal and excessive growth of tissue (neoplasm) that typically has elements of mucin and one or more cysts. By location, they include:

- Pancreatic mucinous cystic neoplasm: These lesions are benign, though there is a high rate of progression to cancer. As such, surgery should be pursued when feasible. The rate of malignancy present in MCN is about 10 percent. If resection is performed before invasive malignancy develops, the prognosis is excellent. The extent of invasion is the single most important prognostic factor in predicting survival.
- Mucinous cystic neoplasms of the liver are a type of liver cancer in which tissue similar to the stroma of ovary occurs.
