= Intra-ampullary papillary–tubular neoplasm =

Abnormal growths of the hepatopancreatic duct

- Other names: Intra-ampullary papillary tubular neoplasm, intra-ampulla papillary–tubular neoplasm, IAPN
- Specialty: Gastroenterology, oncology

Intra-ampullary papillary–tubular neoplasms (IAPN) are precancerous neoplasms of the ampulla of Vater. On histological examination the neoplasms exhibit both papillary and tubular features.

IAPN were first described in 2010. They are rare; comprising 0.5% of gastrointestinal tumours.

== See also ==
- Duodenal cancer
- Intraductal papillary mucinous neoplasm
