= Papillary tumor =

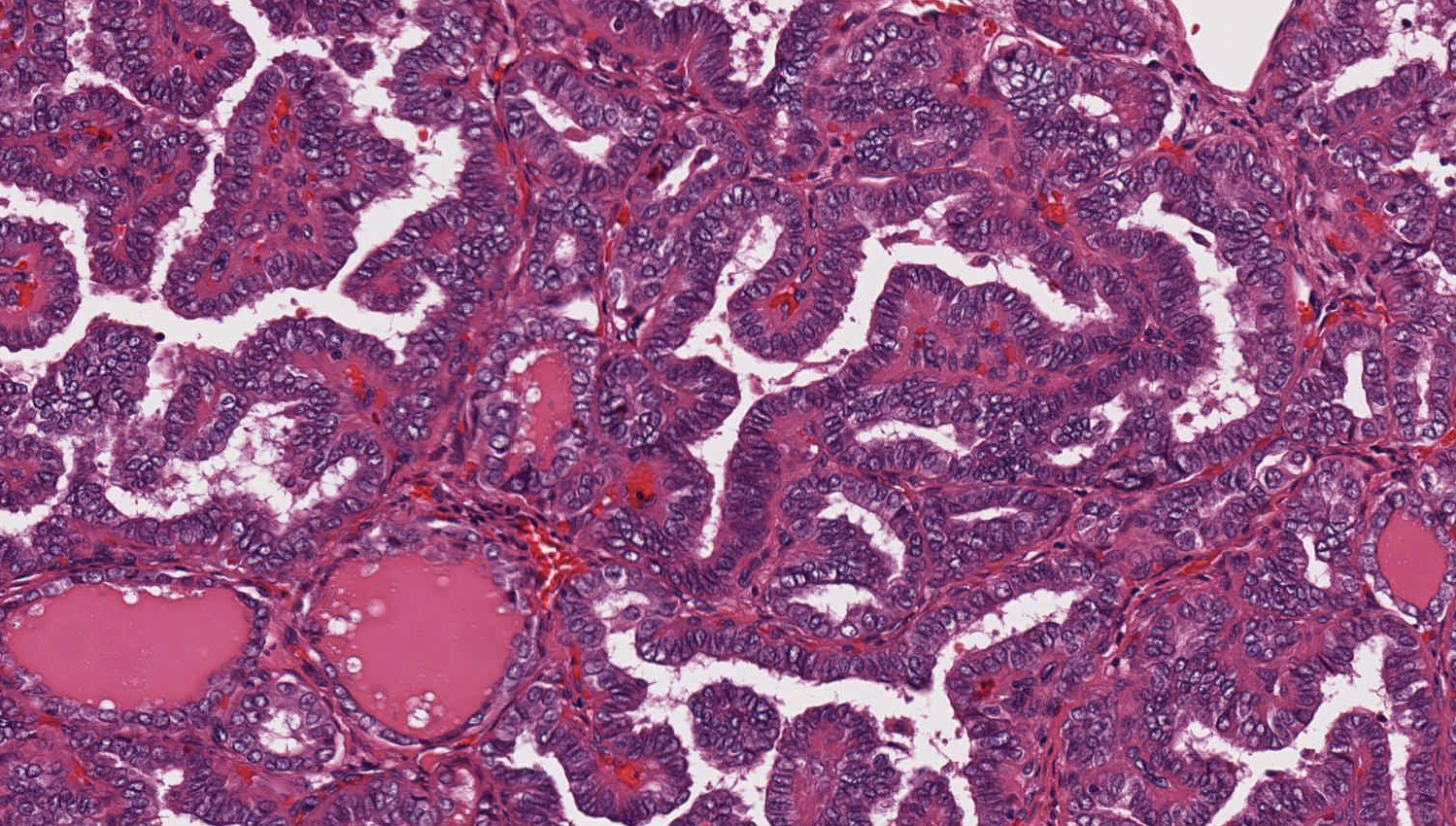
Histopathology of a thyroid papillary carcinoma.

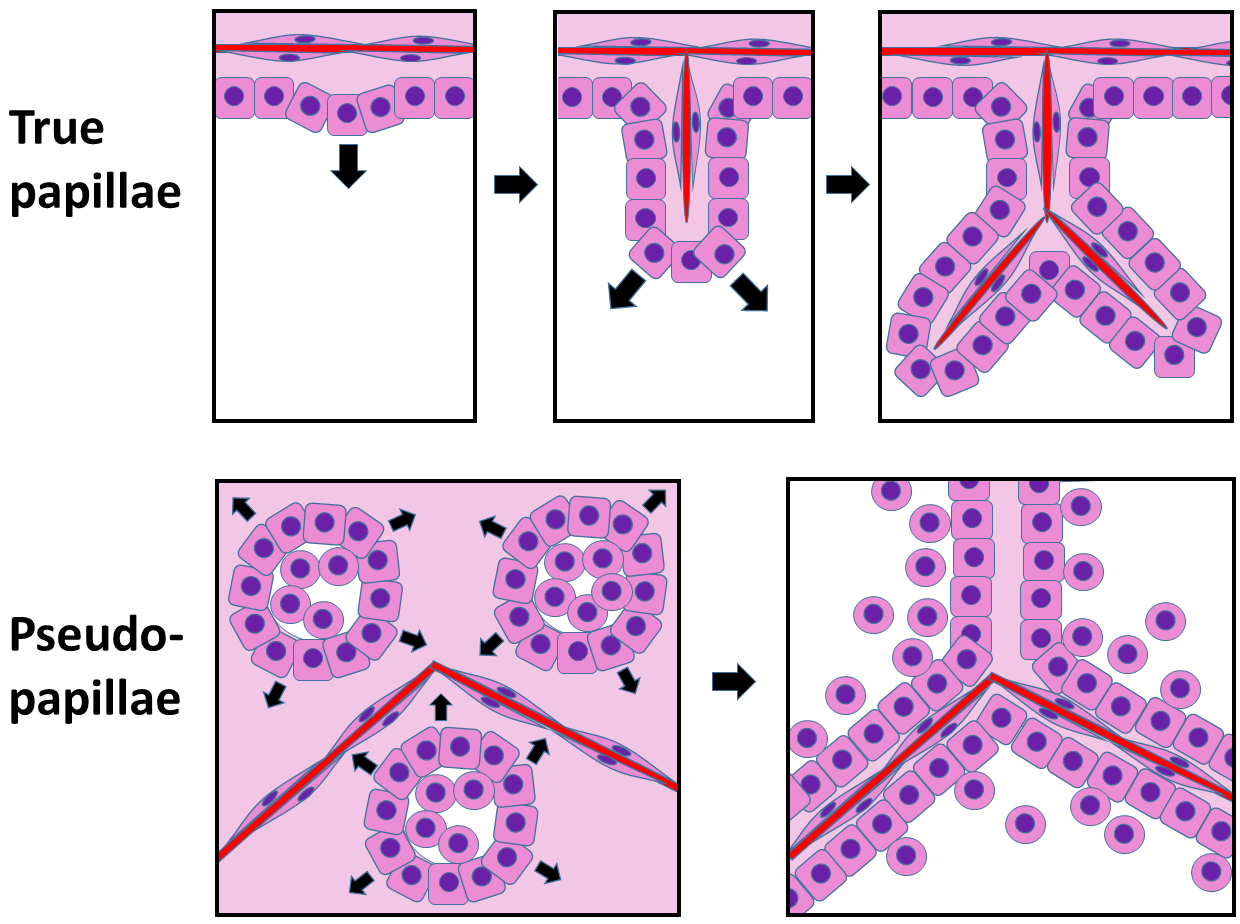
Papillae vs pseudopapillae: True papillae are outgrowths of epithelium, surrounding fibrovascular cores of stroma and at least one blood vessel. In contrast, pseudopapillae (such as in solid pseudopapillary tumors) are nests of proliferating cells that eventually grow to become almost back-to-back, with cells in the centers of nests disintegrating, leaving rims of cells lining the periphery of each nest. Discohesive cells and some formations lacking central blood vessels are visual clues.

A papillary tumor is a tumor shaped like a small mushroom, with its stem attached to the epithelial layer (inner lining) of an organ. It consists of papillae, which are outgrowths that consist of stroma with at least one central blood vessel, surrounded by epithelium. Usually, the epithelium constitutes the true tumor cells, and the fibrovascular cores (stroma and blood vessels) consist of reactive supportive tissue.
