= Cystadenoma =

Benign closed-sac tumor of glandular origin

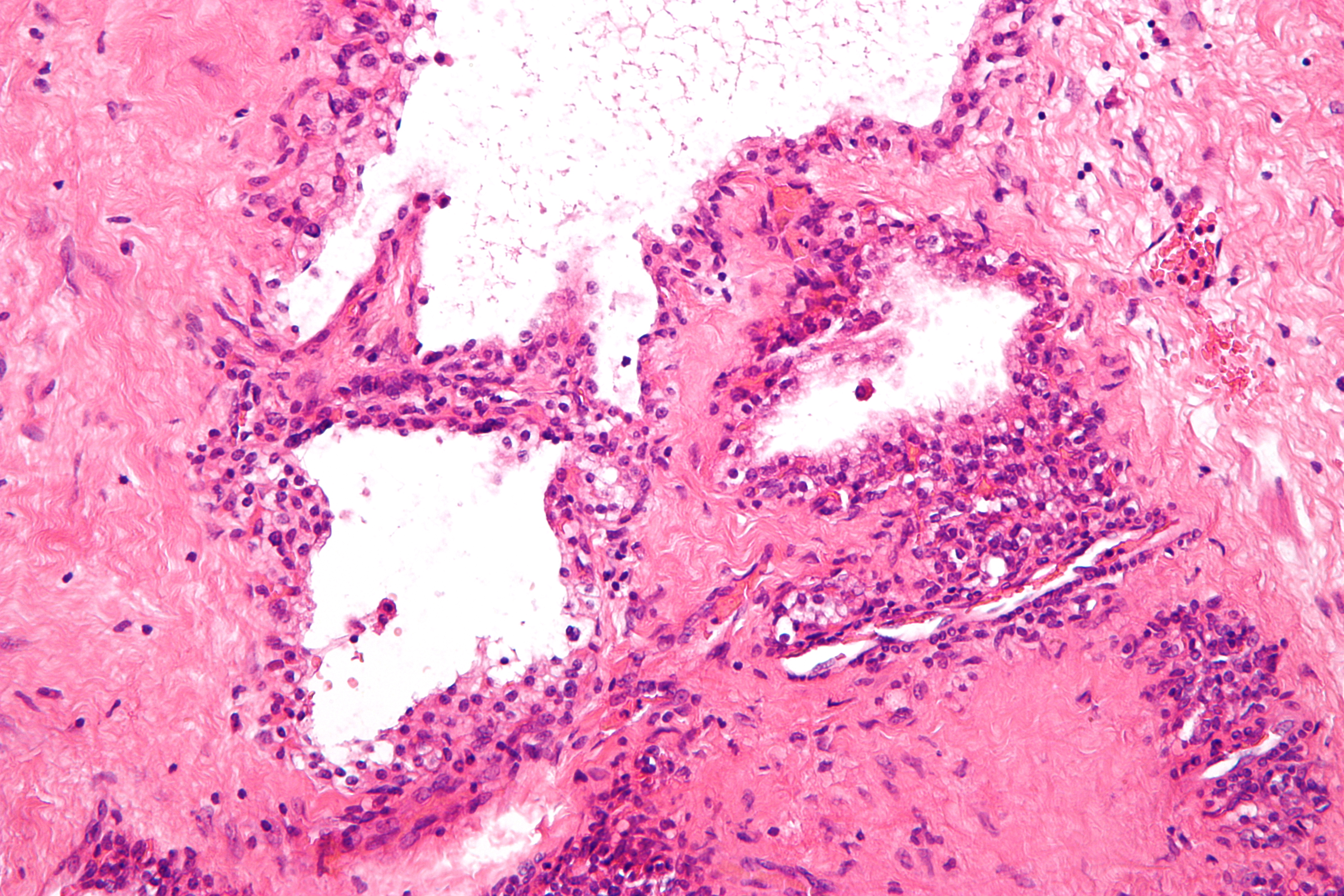
- Micrograph showing a pancreatic serous cystadenoma, a type of cystadenoma. H&E stain.
- Specialty: Oncology

Cystadenoma is a type of cystic adenoma. When malignant, it is called cystadenocarcinoma.

== Classification ==
When not otherwise specified, the ICD-O coding is 8440/0. However, the following classifications also exist:

=== By form ===
- serous cystadenoma (8441-8442)
- papillary cystadenoma (8450-8451, 8561)
- mucinous cystadenoma (8470-8473)

=== By location ===
- Bile duct cystadenoma (8161) or biliary cystadenoma is a slow-growing tumour arising from bile ducts of the liver. The presence of endocrine cells in the tumour also indicates its origin from the glands surrounding the bile ducts. The incidence is 1–5 in 100,000 people. Females are affected more than males at a 9:1 ratio. Mean age of presentation is 45 years old. About 30% of biliary cystadenoma can progressively become malignant over time.
- Endometrioid cystadenoma (8380)
- Appendix: The term mucinous cystadenoma is an obsolete term for appendiceal mucinous neoplasm

The term "cystadenoma" may also refer to a hidrocystoma.

== See also ==
- Warthin's tumor
