= Pancreatic mucinous cystic neoplasm =

- Other names: MCN
- Specialty: Gastroenterology
- Complications: Pancreatic cancer
- Usual onset: 40-60 years of age
- Risk factors: Female gender, older age
- Treatment: Surgical resection

Pancreatic mucinous cystic neoplasm (MCN) is a type of cystic lesion that occurs in the pancreas. Amongst individuals undergoing surgical resection of a pancreatic cyst, about 23 percent were mucinous cystic neoplasms. These lesions are benign, though there is a high rate of progression to cancer. As such, surgery should be pursued when feasible. The rate of malignancy present in MCN is about 10 percent. If resection is performed before invasive malignancy develops, prognosis is excellent. The extent of invasion is the single most important prognostic factor in predicting survival.

== Pathology ==
Histologic evaluation of MCNs shows mucin-producing columnar epithelial lining, which is surrounded by ovarian-like stroma. Calcification may be present. Factors that predict malignancy include loculated appearance, mural nodules, papillary projections, p53 immunoreactivity, and loss of ovarian-like stroma.

== Diagnosis ==
The diagnosis of pancreatic MCN is typically achieved with imaging. If the results of imaging (CT/MRI) are unclear, then endoscopic ultrasound with fine needle aspiration (EUS-FNA) of the cyst may be necessary. Cyst fluid analysis may help distinguish potentially premalignant mucinous cysts (MCNs and IPMNs), from benign non-mucinous cysts. However, cyst fluid analysis cannot rule out the presence of pancreatic cancer or high grade dysplasia.

== Management ==
Where possible, surgical resection of mucinous cystic neoplasms is preferable. In individuals who are eligible to undergo surgery, who are found to have asymptomatic cysts that appear to be benign MCNs or IPMNs, then surveillance imaging may be considered.

Following surgery, if resected tissue consists only of MCN without cancer, then further postoperative surveillance imaging is not necessary.

In individuals unable to undergo surgery, there may be a role for endoscopic ultrasound (EUS) guided ablation with alcohol lavage with paclitaxel injection. EUS guided therapy has been performed successfully, though more data is necessary, particularly prospective study. An EUS-guided approach appears more effective with smaller sized MCNs.

== Epidemiology ==
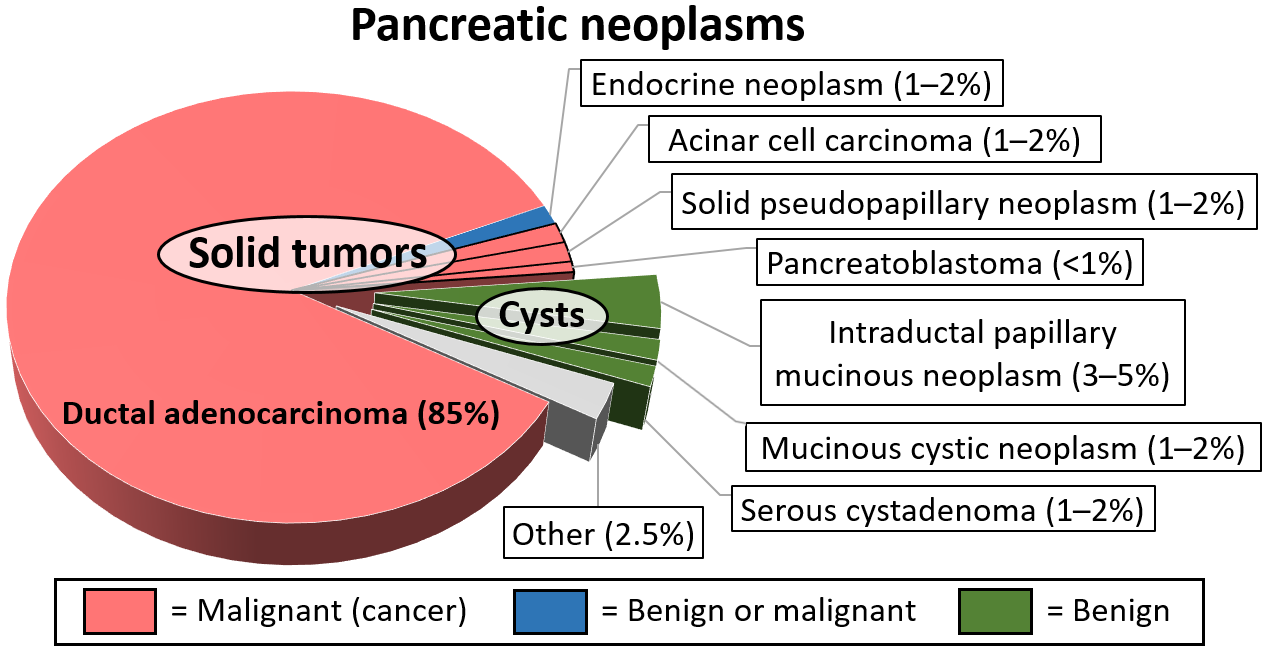
Relative incidences of various pancreatic neoplasms, with mucinous cystic neoplasm annotated near bottom right.

MCNs are much more common in women. A study in 2012 found that amongst individuals undergoing surgical resection of a pancreatic cyst, about 23 percent were mucinous cystic neoplasms. The rate of malignancy present in MCN is about 10 percent. Malignancy is more often present in older individuals.

== See also ==
- Intraductal papillary mucinous neoplasm
- Pancreatic serous cystadenoma
