= Solid pseudopapillary tumour =

- Other names: Solid pseudopapillary neoplasm, solid pseudopapillary tumour/neoplasm of the pancreas, Frantz's tumour
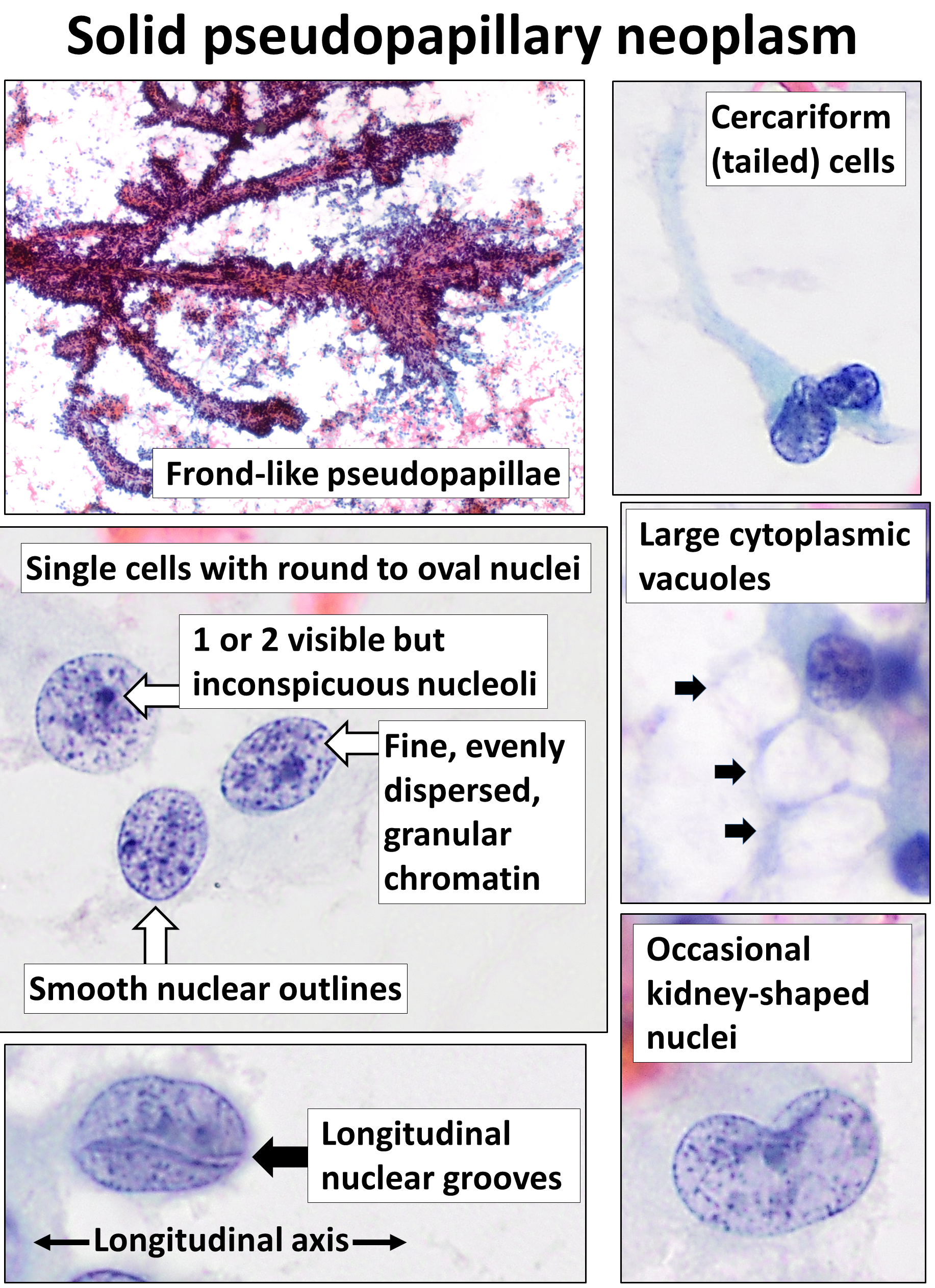
- Cytopathology of solid pseudopapillary tumour/neoplasm with main findings that distinguish it from pancreatic endocrine neoplasms and acinar cell carcinomas. Diff-Quik stain.
- Specialty: Oncology

A solid pseudopapillary tumour is a low-grade malignant neoplasm of the pancreas of papillary architecture that typically afflicts young women.

== Signs and symptoms ==
Solid pseudopapillary tumours are often asymptomatic and are identified incidentally on imaging performed for unrelated reasons. Less often, they may cause abdominal pain. Solid pseudopapillary tumours tend to occur in women, and most often present in the third decade of life.

== Diagnosis ==
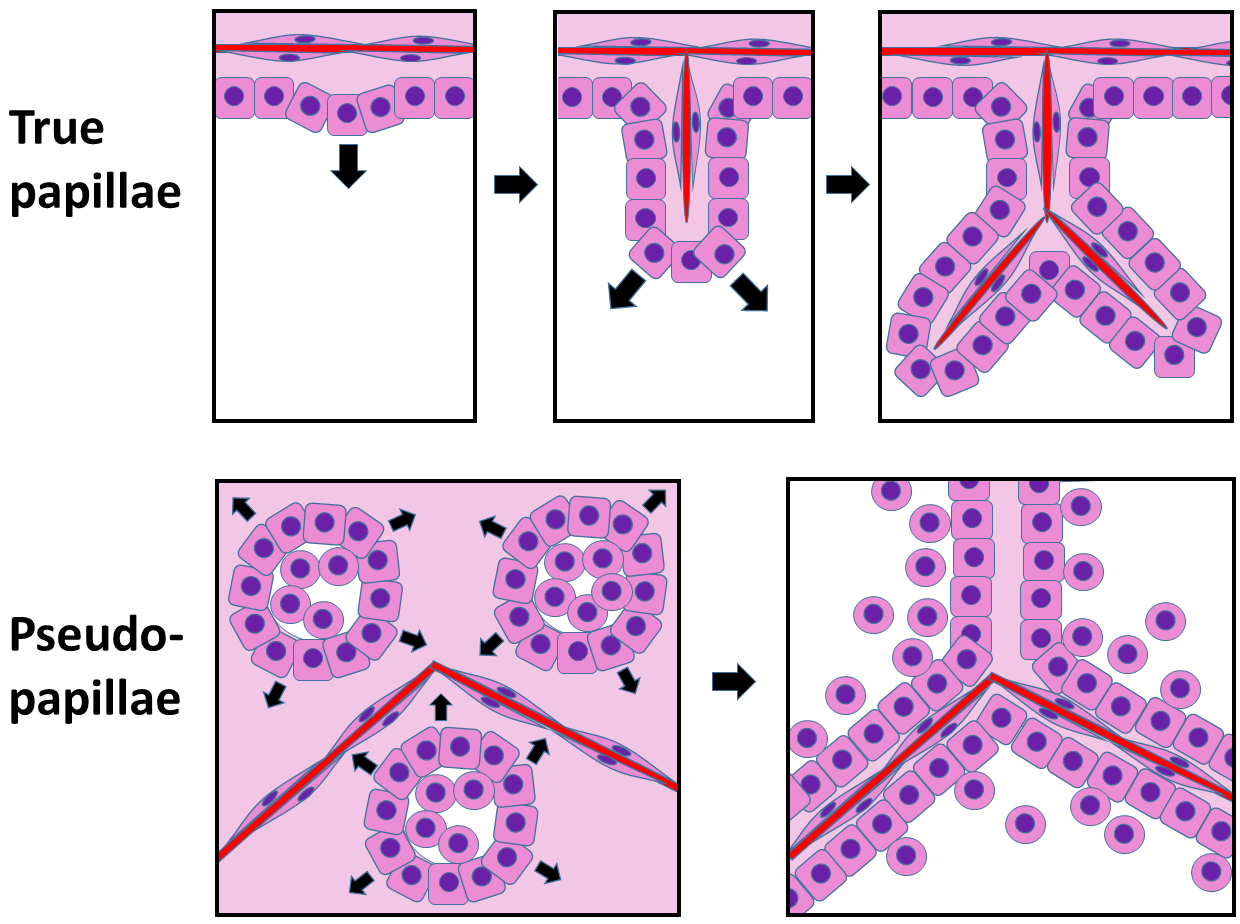
Papillae vs pseudopapillae: True papillae are outgrowths of epithelium, surrounding fibrovascular cores of stroma and at least one blood vessel. In contrast, pseudopapillae (such as in solid pseudopapillary tumours) are nests of proliferating cells that eventually grow to become almost back-to-back, with cells in the centers of nests disintegrating, leaving rims of cells lining the periphery of each nest. Discohesive cells and some formations lacking central blood vessels are visual clues.

The gold standard for diagnosing solid pseudopapillary tumour of the pancreas is cytopathology by endoscopic ultrasound (EUS) guided fine needle aspiration (FNA) of the lesion. After surgical excision, the tumor can undergo histopathology evaluation for cancer staging.

=== Gross morphology ===
Solid pseudopapillary tumours are typically round, well-demarcated, measuring 2–17 cm in diameter (average 8 cm), with solid and cystic areas with hemorrhage on cut sections.

=== Histomorphology ===
Solid pseudopapillary tumours consist of solid sheets of cells that are focally dyscohesive. The cells in the lesion usually have uniform nuclei with occasional nuclear grooves, eosinophilic or clear cytoplasm and PAS positive eosinophilic intracytoplasmic globules. Necrosis is usually present and, as cell death preferentially occurs distant from blood vessels, lead to the formation of pseudopapillae.

=== Immunohistochemistry ===
Solid pseudopapillary tumours show positive nuclear staining for beta catenin, as well as positive immunostaining for CD10, CD56, vimentin, alpha 1-antitrypsin, and neuron specific enolase; they are negative for chromogranin and pancreatic enzymes.

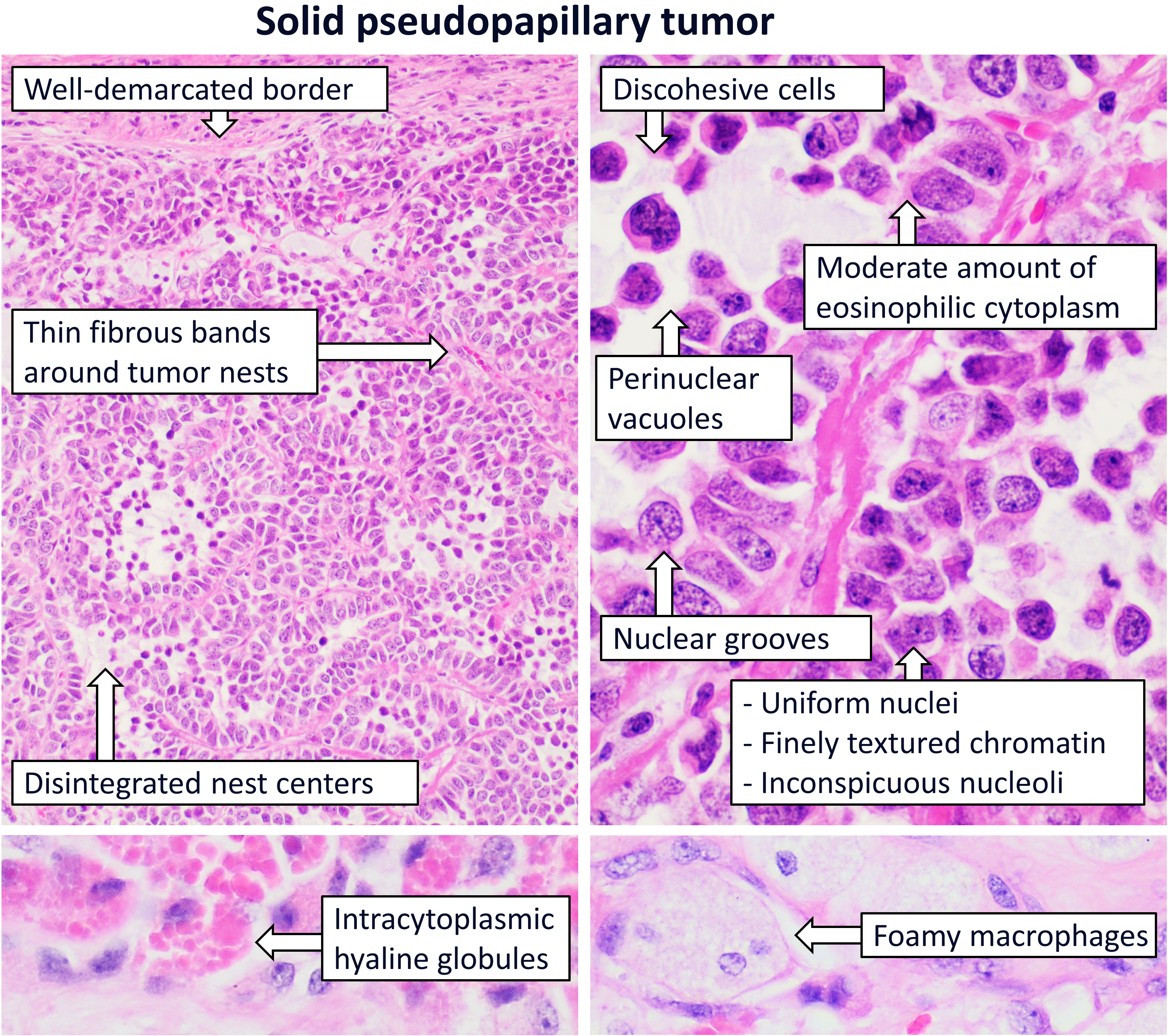
Histopathology of solid pseudopapillary tumor

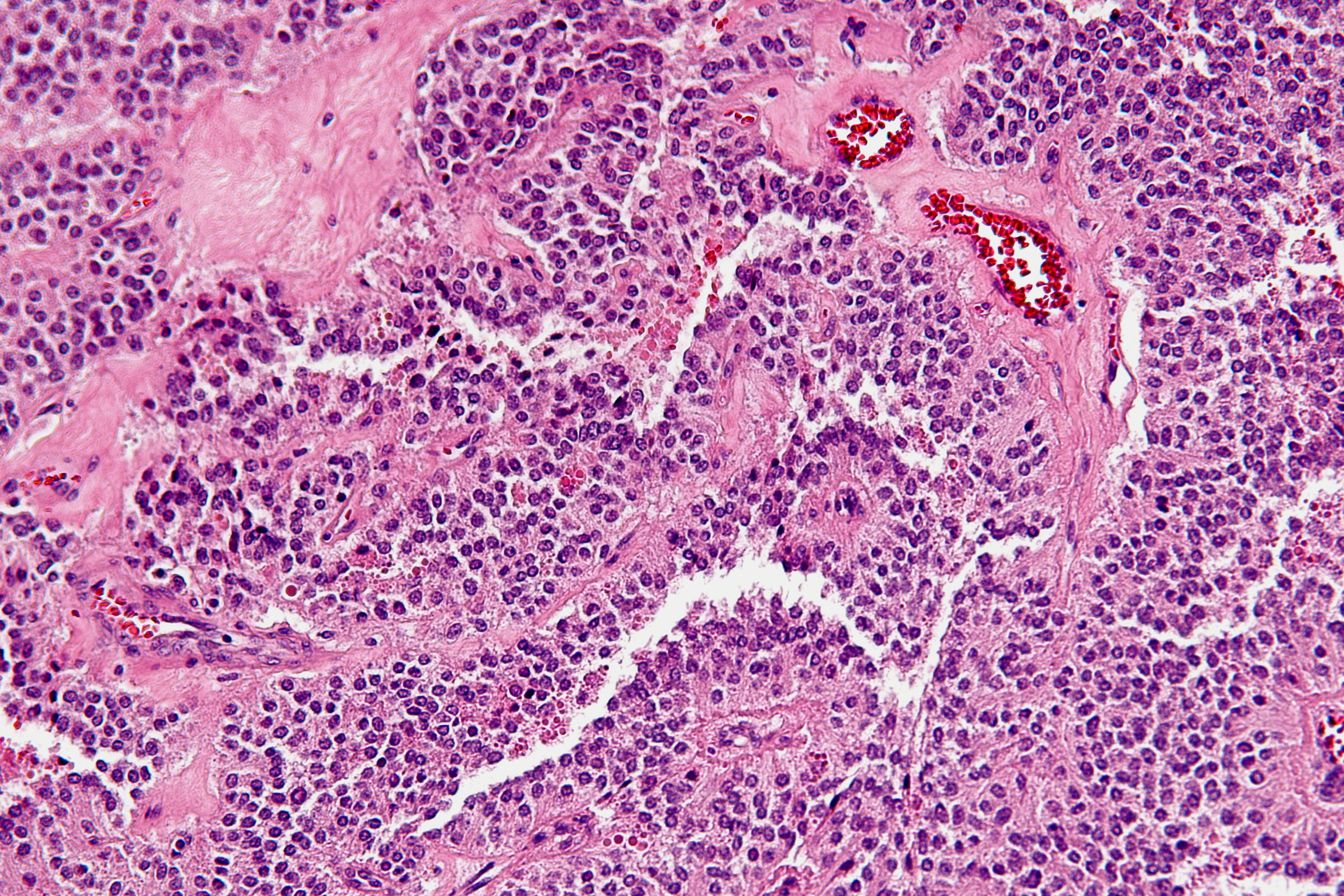
Histopathology of a solid pseudopapillary tumour. H&E stain. This case also shows the key feature of intracytoplasmic hyaline globules.

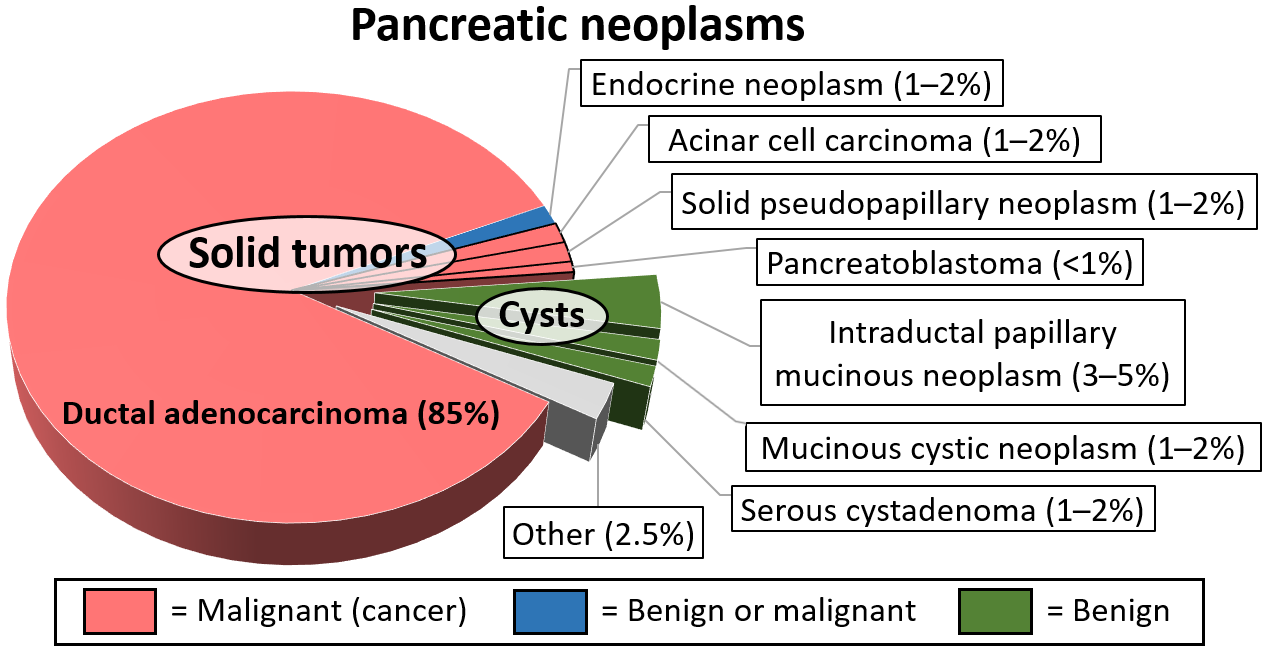
Relative incidence of various pancreatic neoplasms, with solid pseudopapillary neoplasm annotated at center right.

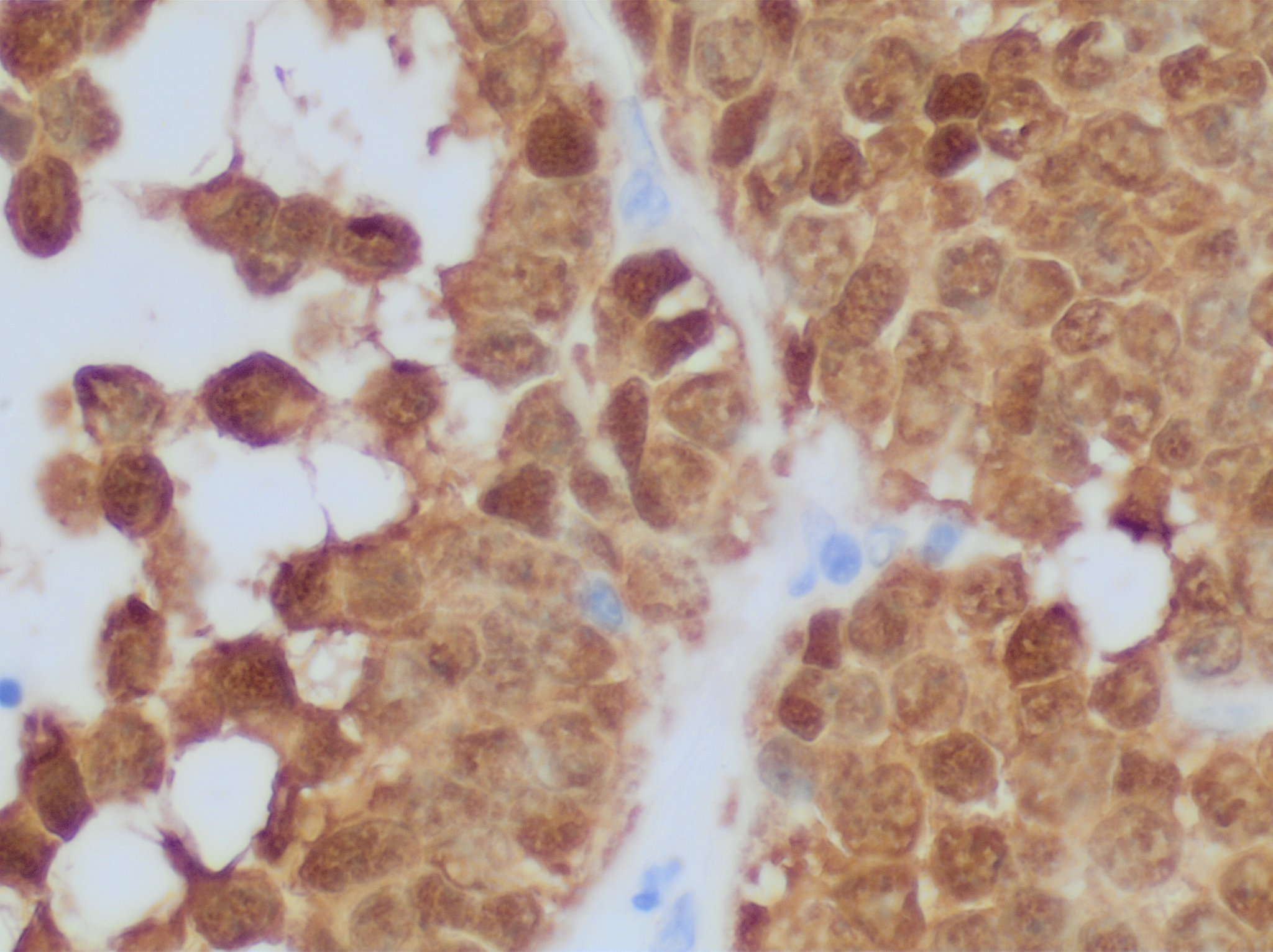
β-catenin immunohistochemistry in solid pseudopapillary tumor, staining the nuclei in 98% of such cases. Cytoplasm is also staining in this case.

== Management ==
In most cases, solid pseudopapillary tumours should be resected surgically, as there is a risk of malignancy (cancer).

== See also ==
- Pancreatic cancer
- Pancreatic mucinous cystic neoplasm
- Serous cystadenoma of the pancreas
