= Pancreatic tumor =

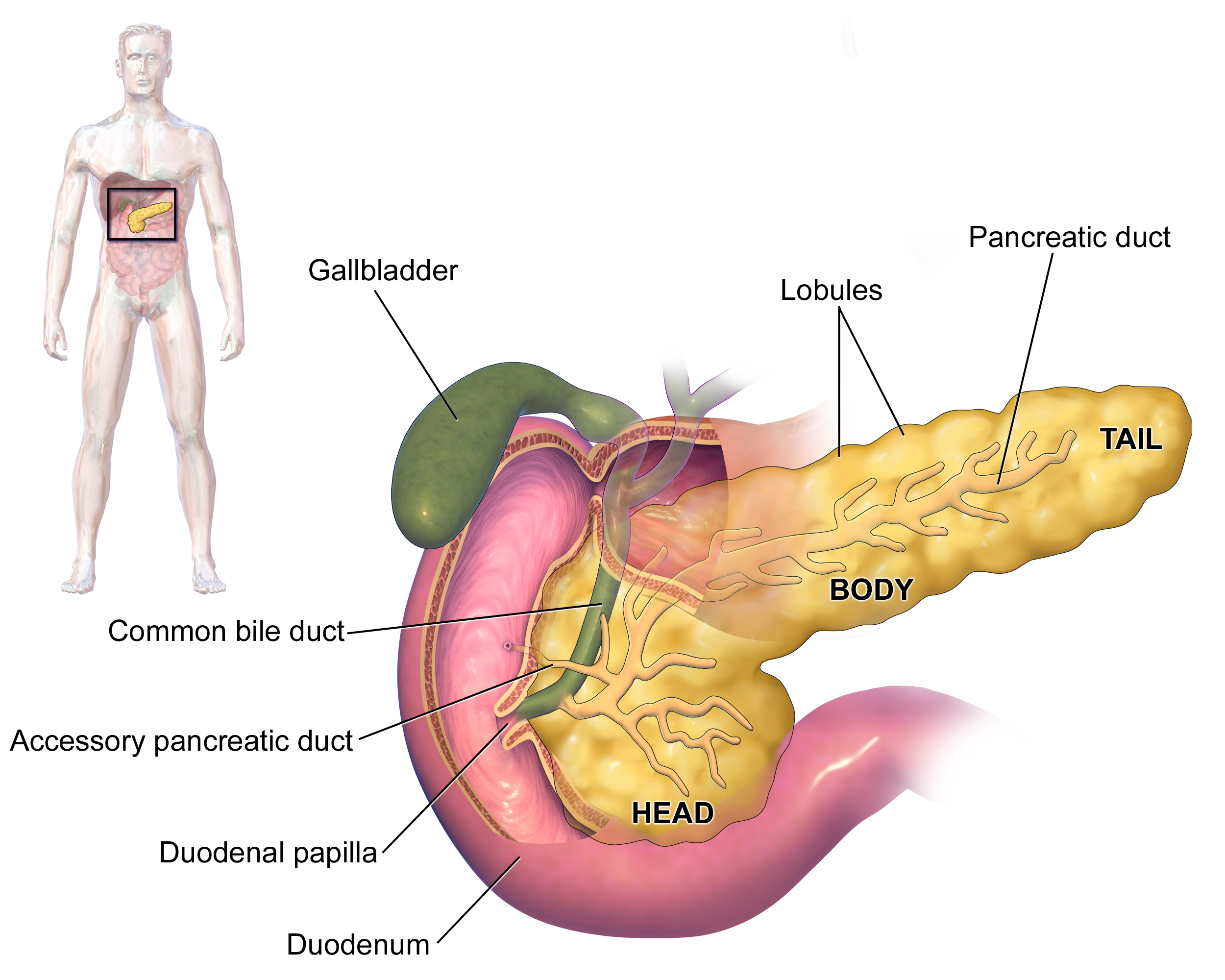
- Anatomy of the pancreas
- Specialty: Gastroenterology, Hepatology, Oncology
- Usual onset: Adults

A pancreatic tumor is an abnormal growth in the pancreas. In adults, almost 90% are pancreatic cancer and a few are benign. Pancreatic tumors are rare in children.

Classification is based on cellular differentiation (ductal, acinar, neuroendocrine, other) and gross appearance (intraductal, cystic, solid). Each different type of pancreatic tumor has a different appearance when examined under a microscope. These unique microscopic features and genetic markers are what allow for proper diagnosis and treatments in patients with pancreatic cancers.

== Types ==
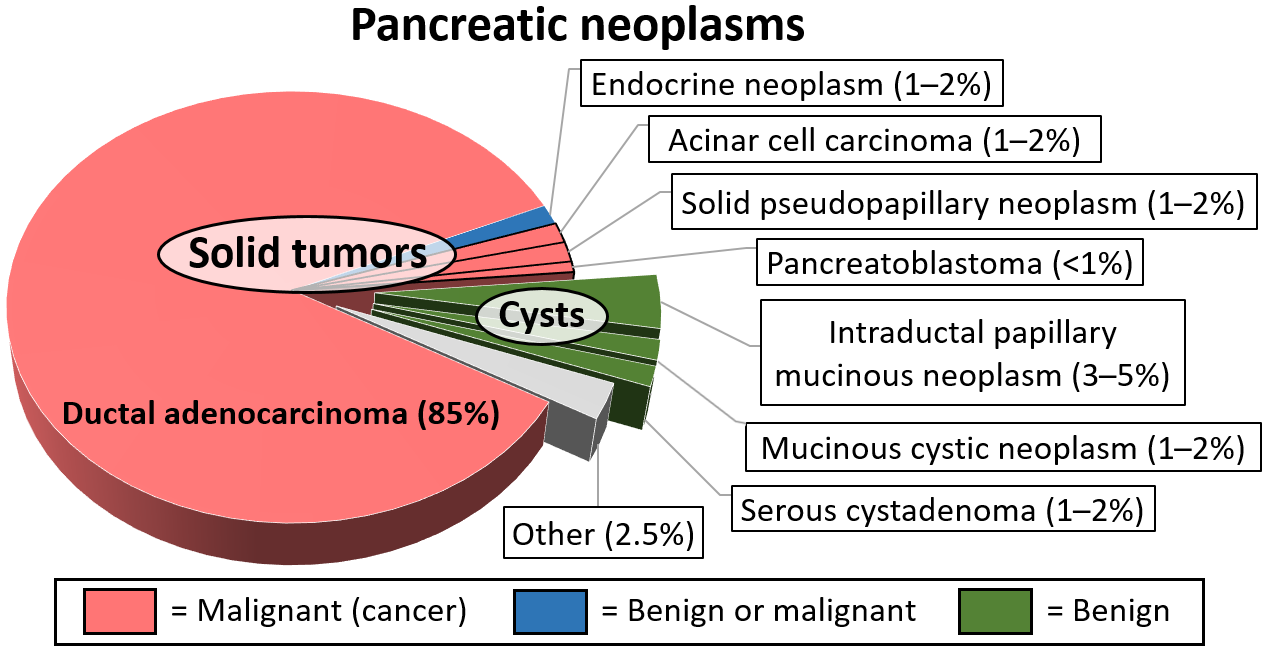
Relative incidences of various pancreatic neoplasm.

The most common type of pancreatic tumor is pancreatic adenocarcinoma, which accounts near 90% of all pancreas cancers. Adenocarcinomas are exocrine tumors of the pancreas, which implies that they begin within the part of the pancreas responsible for creating digestive enzymes. Different subtypes of exocrine adenocarcinomas exist, with the most common being pancreatic ductal adenocarcinoma (PDAC).

Following PDACs, acinar cell carcinomas account for 5% of exocrine pancreatic cancers and can be "functioning", and overproduce certain molecules that can lead to some of the signs and symptoms that are often encountered in pancreatic cancers.

The last type of exocrine tumors include pancreatic mucinous cystic neoplasms, which have fluid filled cavities. These types of tumors are common and mostly benign, although certain subtypes have varying malignant potential.

The second broad category of pancreatic tumor types are neuroendocrine tumors (also known as "endocrine" or "islet cell tumors"). These types of tumors arise from hormone-producing cells in the pancreas and account for only 1-2% of all pancreatic tumors. These endocrine tumors tend to be classified into either "functioning" or "non-functioning" types depending on whether the release hormones or not. For example, some of these pancreatic endocrine tumors release hormones such as insulin, gastrin and glucagon systemically. Often times, these large surges in hormones lead to a relatively early detection due to symptoms that arise in response. Pancreatic endocrine tumors are named after the type of hormone they release. For example, an insulin-secreting tumor is referred to as an "insulinoma". On the other end of the spectrum, non-functioning types of endocrine tumors do not secrete hormones and thus do not give rise to obvious clinical symptoms. This latter type is therefore often diagnosed after spread to other parts of the body.

== Symptoms and Presentation ==
The defining presenting symptom of patients is jaundice or a "yellowing" of the skin and eyes. Although this jaundice has been described as painless in textbooks, a significant number of patients present with pain in addition to jaundice, typically arising in the upper abdomen and radiating to the back. Additional presenting symptoms include abdominal pain, nausea, vomiting, and generalized itching. Often, significant weight loss and loss of appetite is also present.

== Management ==
After diagnosis and proper staging of pancreatic cancer, candidacy for surgical resection is then assessed.
