= Pancreatic serous cystadenoma =

- Other names: Serous cystadenoma of the pancreas, serous microcystic adenoma
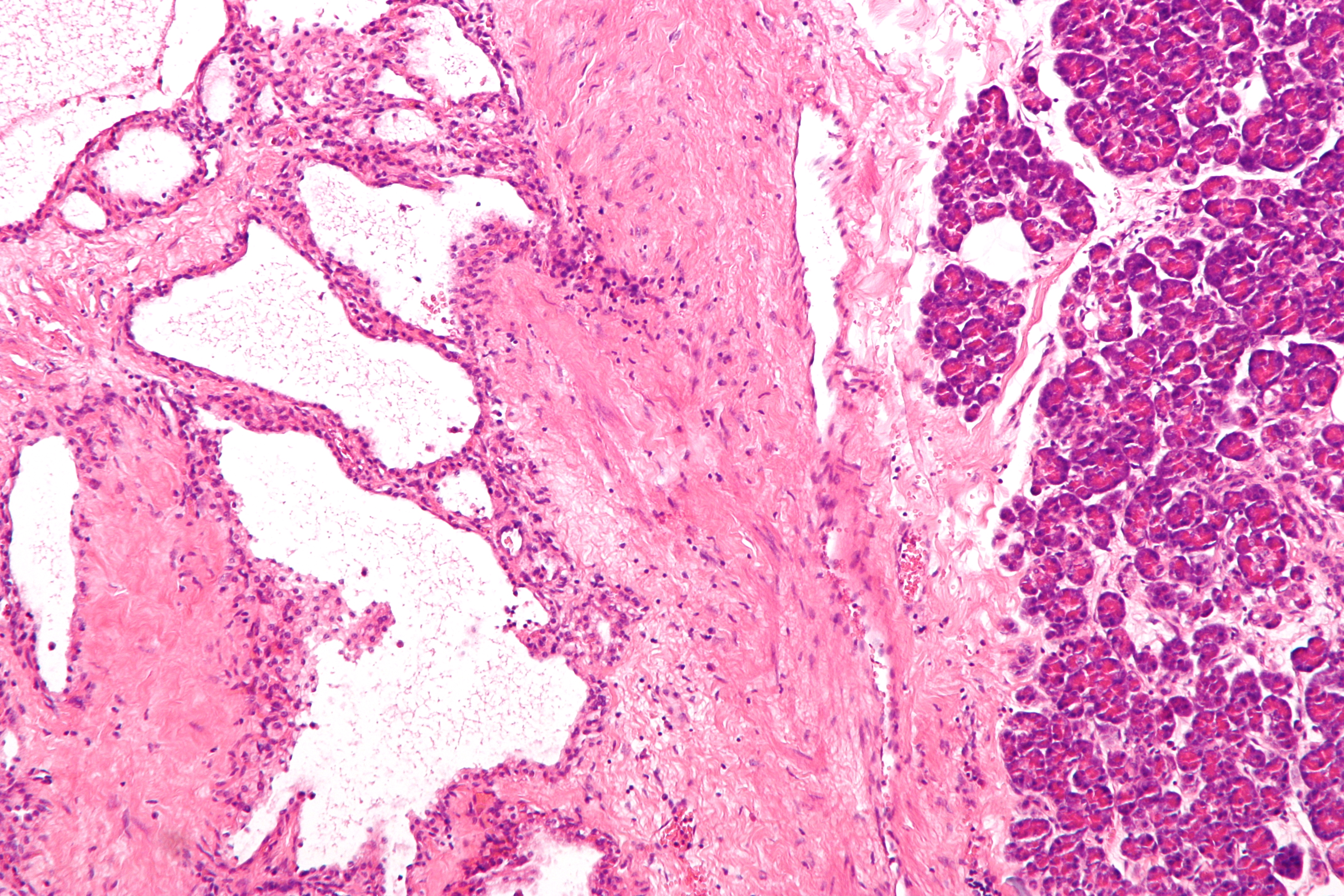
- Micrograph showing a pancreatic serous cystadenoma. H&E stain.
- Specialty: General surgery, gastroenterology
- Symptoms: Usually asymptomatic
- Usual onset: 50–60 years of age
- Risk factors: Female gender
- Treatment: Surgical resection (if symptomatic)
- Deaths: 0.1%

Pancreatic serous cystadenoma is a benign tumour of the pancreas. It is usually solitary and found in the body or tail of the pancreas, and may be associated with von Hippel–Lindau syndrome.

In contrast to some of the other cyst-forming tumors of the pancreas (such as the intraductal papillary mucinous neoplasm and the pancreatic mucinous cystadenoma), serous cystic neoplasms are almost always entirely benign. There are some exceptions; rare case reports have described isolated malignant serous cystadenocarcinomas. In addition, serous cystic neoplasms slowly grow, and if they grow large enough they can press on adjacent organs and cause symptoms.

== Signs and symptoms ==
In most cases, serous cystadenomas of the pancreas are asymptomatic. However, large cysts may cause symptoms related to their size.

== Classification ==
Pathologists classify serous cystic neoplasms into two broad groups. Those that are benign, that have not spread to other organs, are designated "serous cystadenoma". Serous cystadenomas can be further sub-typed into microcystic, oligocystic (or macrocystic), solid, mixed serous-endocrine neoplasm, and VHL-associated serous cystic neoplasm. This latter classification scheme is useful because it highlights the range of appearances and the clinical associations of these neoplasms. Serous cystic neoplasms that have spread ("metastasized") to another organ are considered malignant and are designated "serous cystadenocarcinoma".

== Pathology ==
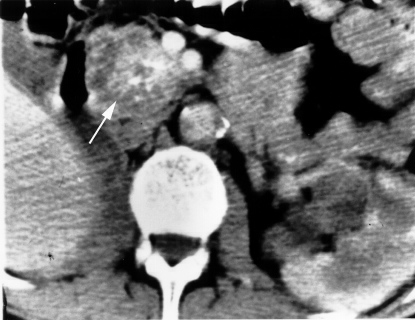

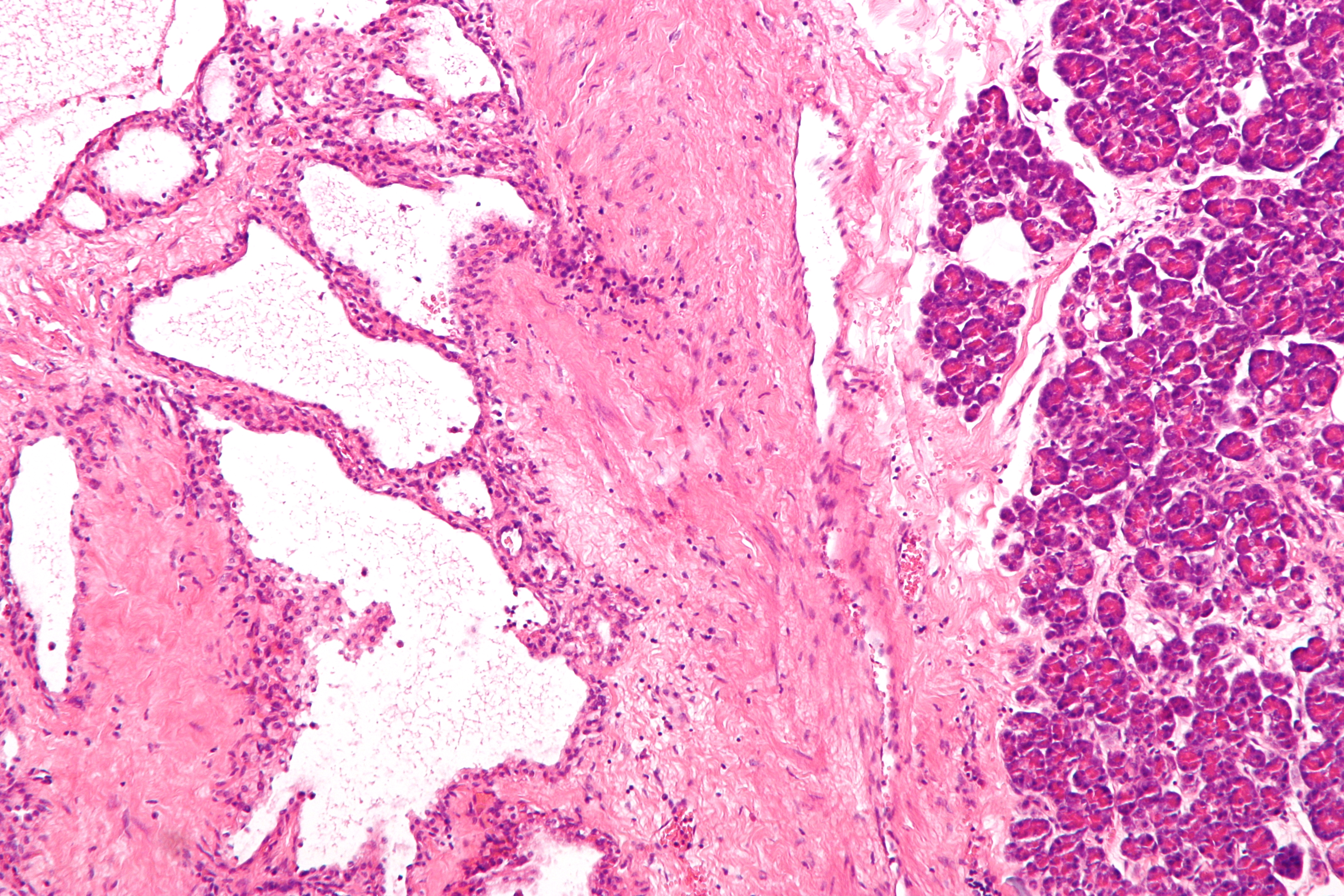

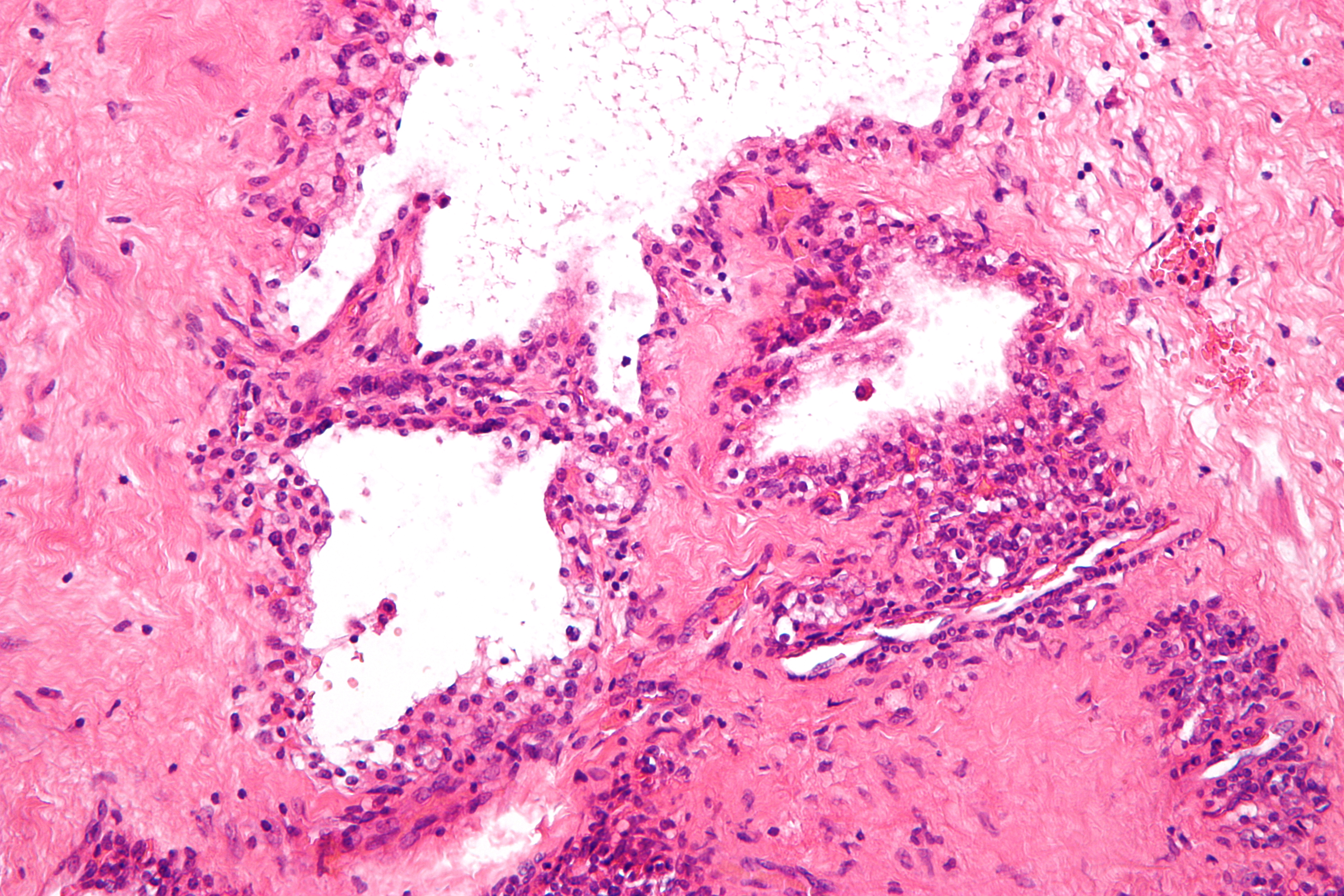

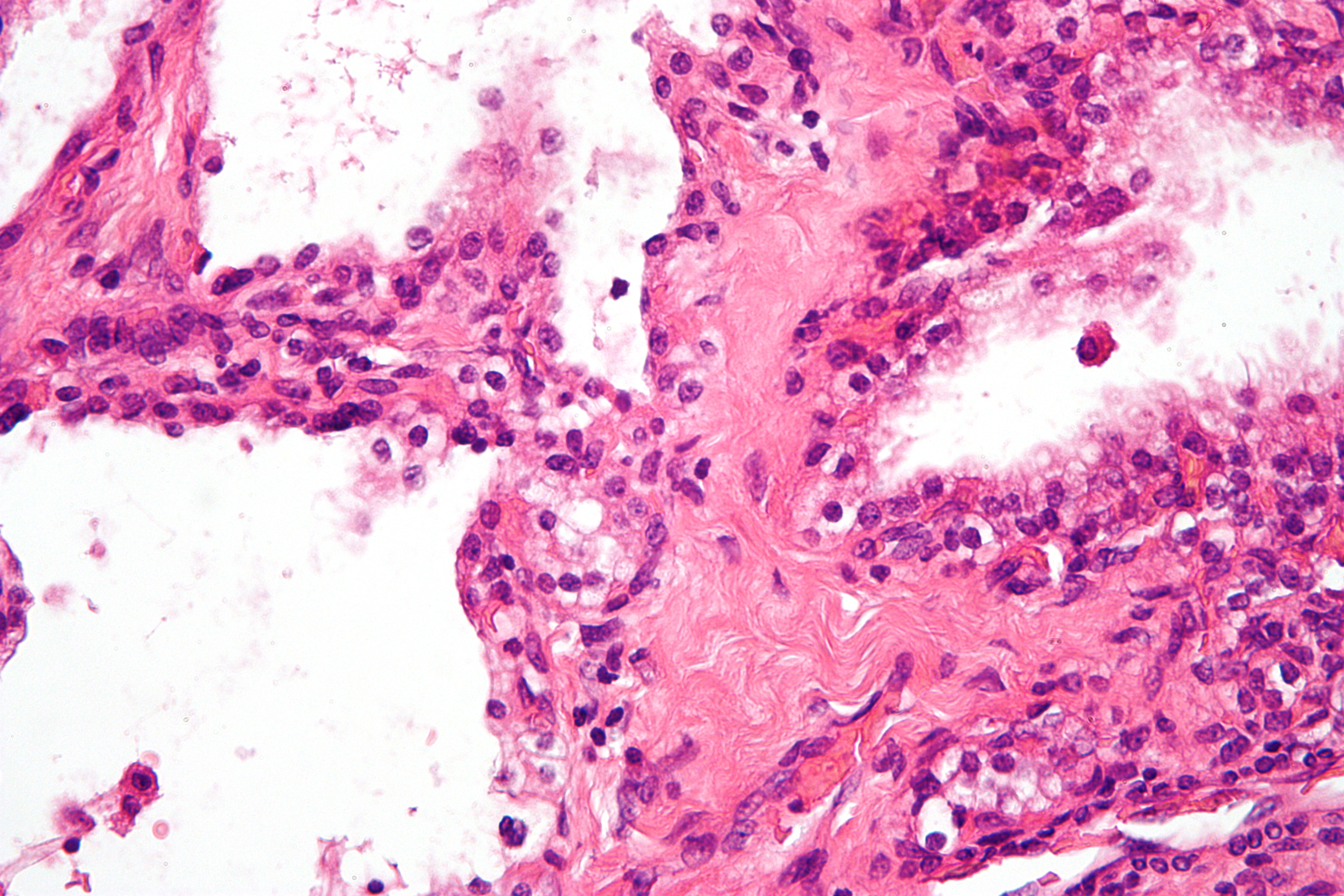

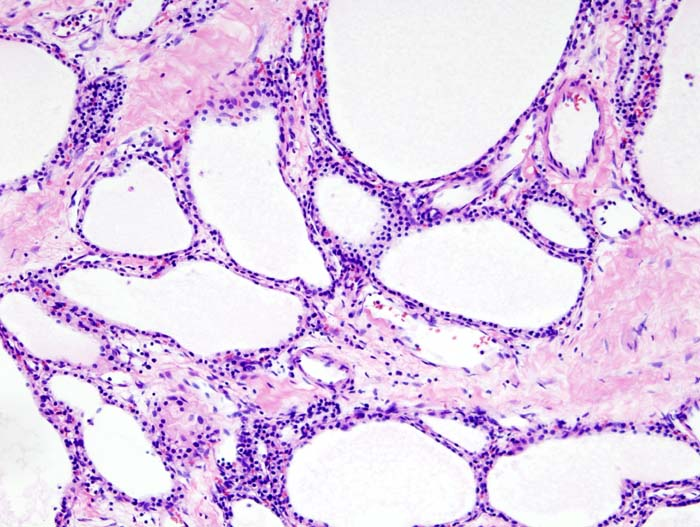

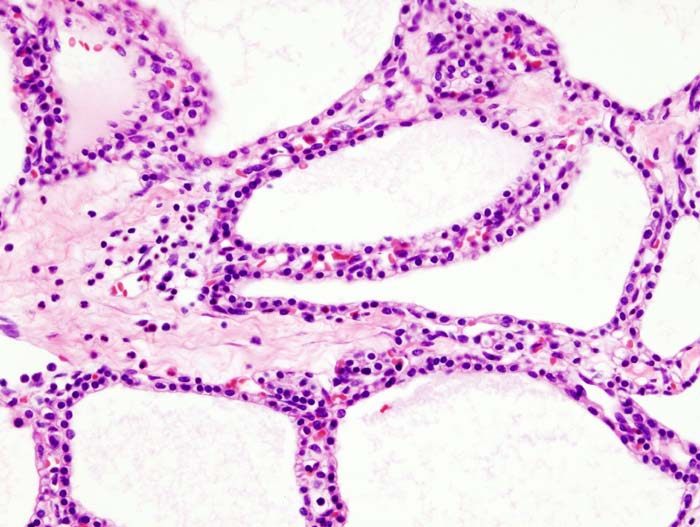

== Treatment ==
These lesions rarely require surgery unless they are symptomatic or the diagnosis is in question. Since these lesions do not have malignant potential, long-term observation with imaging surveillance is unnecessary. Surgery can include the removal of the head of the pancreas (a pancreaticoduodenectomy), removal of the body and tail of the pancreas (a distal pancreatectomy), or rarely removal of the entire pancreas (a total pancreatectomy). In selected cases the surgery can be performed using minimally invasive techniques such as laparoscopy.

== Epidemiology ==
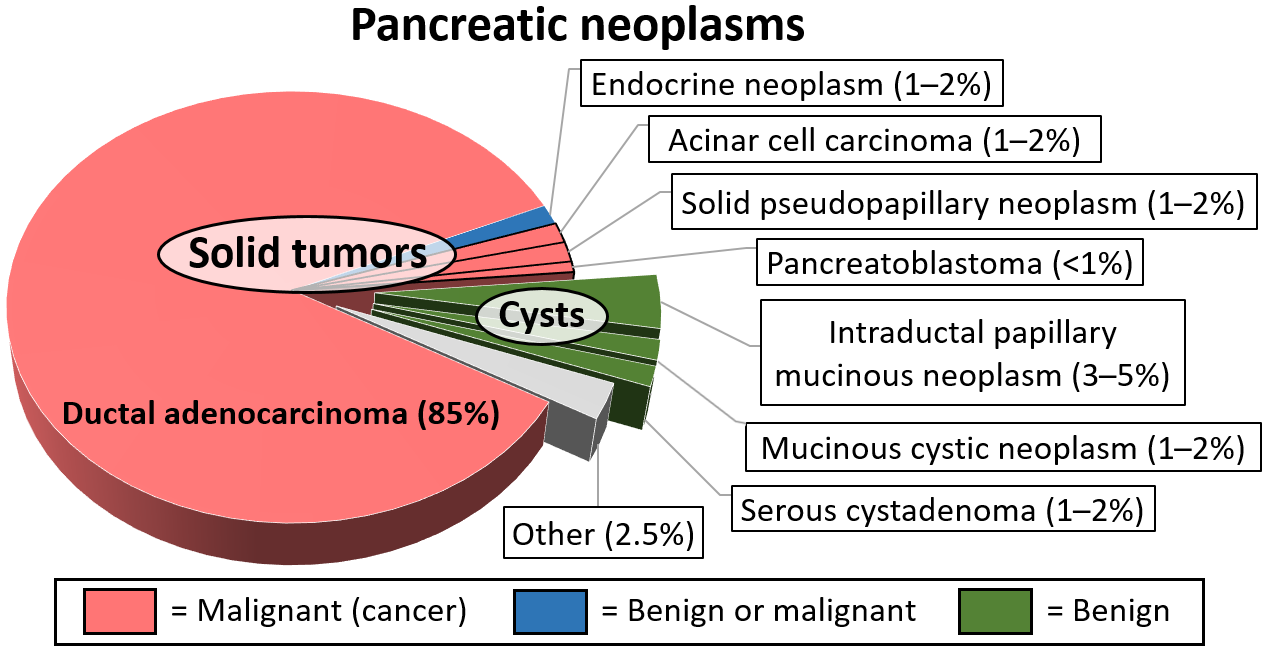
Relative incidences of various pancreatic neoplasms, with serous cystadenoma annotated near bottom right.

Serous cystadenomas of the pancreas are more common in women. SCAs are usually diagnosed in people 50–60 years of age.

== See also ==
- Ovarian serous cystadenoma
- Pancreatic mucinous cystadenoma
- Solid pseudopapillary neoplasm
