= Pancreatic cancer =

Type of endocrine gland cancer

- Position of the pancreas, behind the stomach; (which is transparent in this schematic)
- Specialty: Gastroenterology; Hepatology; Oncology; General surgery
- Symptoms: Yellow skin; Abdominal or back pain; Unexplained weight loss; Light-colored stools; Dark urine; Loss of appetite
- Usual onset: 40+ years of age
- Risk factors: Tobacco smoking; Heavy alcohol intake; Obesity; Diabetes; Certain rare genetic conditions
- Diagnostic method: Medical imaging; Blood tests; Tissue biopsy
- Prevention: Not smoking; Low alcohol intake; Maintaining a healthy weight; Low red meat diet
- Treatment: Surgery; Radiotherapy; Chemotherapy; Palliative care
- Prognosis: Five year survival rate 14% (US, 2022)
- Frequency: 393,800 (2015)
- Deaths: 552,700 (2023)

Pancreatic cancer is any cancer with a primary location in the pancreas, a glandular organ lying behind the stomach. It arises when cells in the pancreas start to multiply out of control and form a mass. These cancerous cells have the ability to invade or spread to other parts of the body. A number of types of pancreatic cancer are known.

The most common type of pancreatic cancer, pancreatic adenocarcinoma, accounts for about 90% of cases, and the term "pancreatic cancer" is sometimes used to refer only to that type. These adenocarcinomas start within the ductal part of the pancreas that makes digestive enzymes. Several other types of cancer, which collectively represent the majority of the non-adenocarcinomas, can also arise from these cells.

About 1–2% of cases of pancreatic cancer are neuroendocrine tumors, which arise from the hormone-producing cells of the pancreas. These are generally less aggressive than pancreatic adenocarcinoma.

Signs and symptoms of the most-common form of pancreatic cancer may include yellow skin, abdominal or back pain, unexplained weight loss, light-colored stools, dark urine, and loss of appetite. Usually, no symptoms are seen in the disease's early stages, and symptoms that are specific enough to suggest pancreatic cancer typically do not develop until the disease has reached an advanced stage. By the time of diagnosis, pancreatic cancer has often spread to other parts of the body.

Pancreatic cancer rarely occurs before the age of 40, and more than half of cases of pancreatic adenocarcinoma occur in those over 70. However, early-onset pancreatic cancer (defined as pancreatic cancer diagnosed in someone <50 years of age) is becoming more prevalent, disproportionally so in younger women.

Risk factors for pancreatic cancer include tobacco smoking, obesity, diabetes, and certain rare genetic conditions. About 25% of cases are linked to smoking, and 5–10% are linked to inherited genes.

Pancreatic cancer is usually diagnosed by a combination of medical imaging techniques such as ultrasound or computed tomography, blood tests, and examination of tissue samples (biopsy). The disease is divided into stages, from early (stage I) to late (stage IV). Screening the general population has not been found to be effective.

The risk of developing pancreatic cancer is lower among non-smokers, and people who maintain a healthy weight and limit their consumption of red or processed meat; the risk is greater for men, smokers, and those with diabetes. There are some studies that link high levels of red meat consumption to increased risk of pancreatic cancer, though meta-analyses typically find no clear evidence of a relationship. Smokers' risk of developing the disease decreases immediately upon quitting, and almost returns to that of the rest of the population after 20 years. Pancreatic cancer can be treated with surgery, radiotherapy, chemotherapy, palliative care, or a combination of these. Treatment options are partly based on the cancer stage. Surgery is the only treatment that can cure pancreatic adenocarcinoma, and may also be done to improve quality of life without the potential for cure. Pain management and medications to improve digestion are sometimes needed. Early palliative care is recommended even for those receiving treatment that aims for a cure.

Pancreatic cancer is among the deadliest forms of cancer globally, with one of the lowest survival rates. In 2021, pancreatic cancers of all types resulted in 508,532 (up from 411,600 in 2013) deaths globally. It is the fifth-most-common cause of death from cancer in the United Kingdom, and the third most-common in the United States.

The disease occurs most often in the developed world, where about 70% of the new cases in 2012 originated. Pancreatic adenocarcinoma typically has a very poor prognosis; after diagnosis, 9% survive after five years globally and 14% live for five years in the US. For cancers diagnosed early, the five-year survival rate rises to about 20%. Neuroendocrine cancers have better outcomes; at five years from diagnosis, 65% of those diagnosed are living, though survival varies considerably depending on the type of tumor.

== Types ==
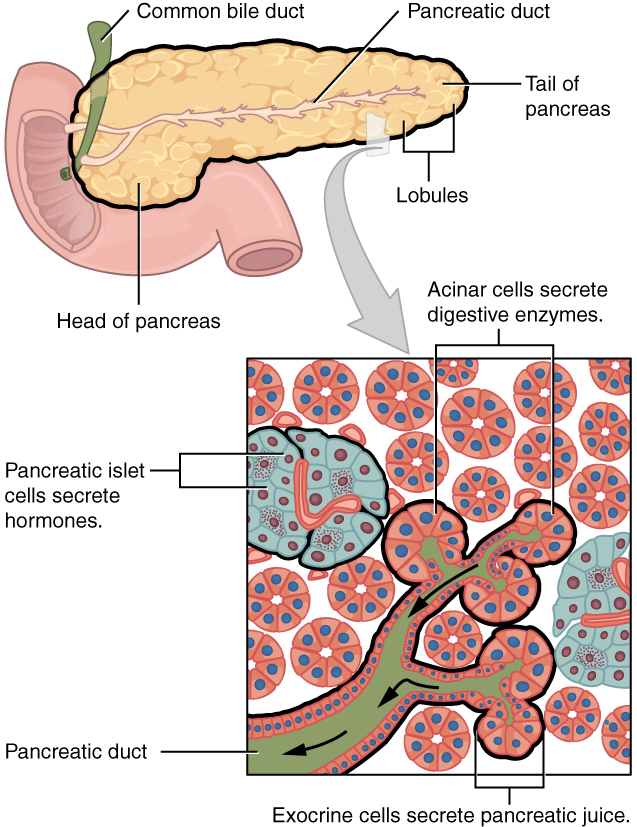
The pancreas has many functions, served by the endocrine cells in the islets of Langerhans and the exocrine acinar cells. Pancreatic cancer may arise from any of these and disrupt any of their functions.

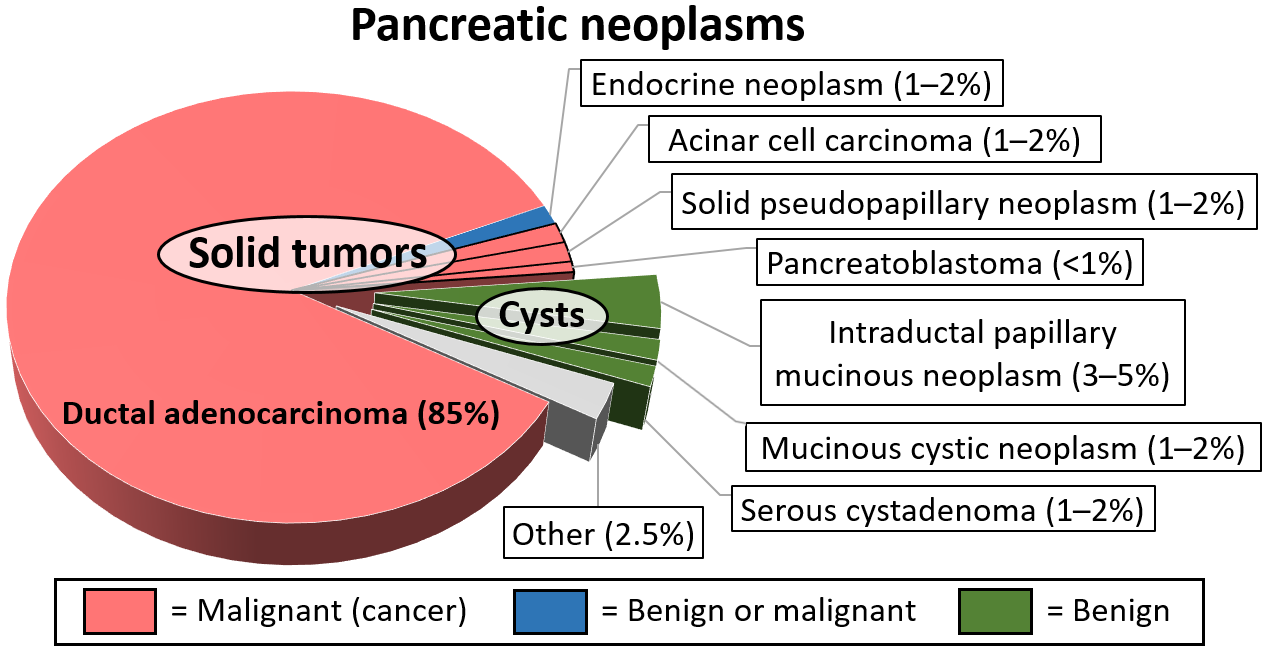
Relative incidences of various pancreatic neoplasms, with pancreatic cancers in red/pink color

The many types of pancreatic cancer can be divided into two general groups. The vast majority of cases (about 95%) occur in the part of the pancreas that produces digestive enzymes, known as the exocrine component. Several subtypes of exocrine pancreatic cancers are described, but their diagnosis and treatment have much in common.

The small minority of cancers that arise in the hormone-producing (endocrine) tissue of the pancreas have different clinical characteristics and are called pancreatic neuroendocrine tumors, sometimes abbreviated as "PanNETs". Both groups occur mainly (but not exclusively) in people over 40, and are slightly more common in men, but some rare subtypes mainly occur in women or children.

=== Exocrine cancers ===
The exocrine group is dominated by pancreatic adenocarcinoma (variations of this name may add "invasive" and "ductal"), which is by far the most common type, representing about 85% of all pancreatic cancers. Nearly all these start in the ducts of the pancreas, as pancreatic ductal adenocarcinoma (PDAC). This is despite the fact that the tissue from which it arises – the pancreatic ductal epithelium – represents less than 10% of the pancreas by cell volume, because it constitutes only the ducts (an extensive but capillary-like duct-system fanning out) within the pancreas. This cancer originates in the ducts that carry secretions (such as enzymes and bicarbonate) away from the pancreas. About 60–70% of adenocarcinomas occur in the head of the pancreas.

The next-most common type, acinar cell carcinoma of the pancreas, arises in the clusters of cells that produce these enzymes, and represents 5% of exocrine pancreas cancers. Like the 'functioning' endocrine cancers described below, acinar cell carcinomas may cause over-production of certain molecules, in this case digestive enzymes, which may cause symptoms such as skin rashes and joint pain.

Cystadenocarcinomas account for 1% of pancreatic cancers, and they have a better prognosis than the other exocrine types.

Pancreatoblastoma is a rare form, mostly occurring in childhood, and with a relatively good prognosis. Other exocrine cancers include adenosquamous carcinomas, signet ring cell carcinomas, hepatoid carcinomas, colloid carcinomas, undifferentiated carcinomas, and undifferentiated carcinomas with osteoclast-like giant cells. Solid pseudopapillary tumor is a rare low-grade neoplasm that mainly affects younger women, and generally has a very good prognosis.

Pancreatic mucinous cystic neoplasms are a broad group of pancreas tumors that have varying malignant potential. They are being detected at a greatly increased rate as CT scans become more powerful and common, and discussion continues as how best to assess and treat them, given that many are benign.

=== Neuroendocrine ===
The small minority of tumors that arise elsewhere in the pancreas are mainly pancreatic neuroendocrine tumors (PanNETs). Neuroendocrine tumors (NETs) are a diverse group of benign or malignant tumors that arise from the body's neuroendocrine cells, which are responsible for integrating the nervous and endocrine systems. NETs can start in most organs of the body, including the pancreas, where the various malignant types are all considered to be rare. PanNETs are grouped into 'functioning' and 'nonfunctioning' types, depending on the degree to which they produce hormones.

The functioning types secrete hormones such as insulin, gastrin, and glucagon into the bloodstream, often in large quantities, giving rise to serious symptoms such as low blood sugar, but also favoring relatively early detection. The most common functioning PanNETs are insulinomas and gastrinomas, named after the hormones they secrete. The nonfunctioning types do not secrete hormones in a sufficient quantity to give rise to overt clinical symptoms, so nonfunctioning PanNETs are often diagnosed only after the cancer has spread to other parts of the body.

As with other neuroendocrine tumors, the history of the terminology and classification of PanNETs is complex. PanNETs are sometimes called "islet cell cancers", though they are now known to not actually arise from islet cells as previously thought.

== Signs and symptoms ==
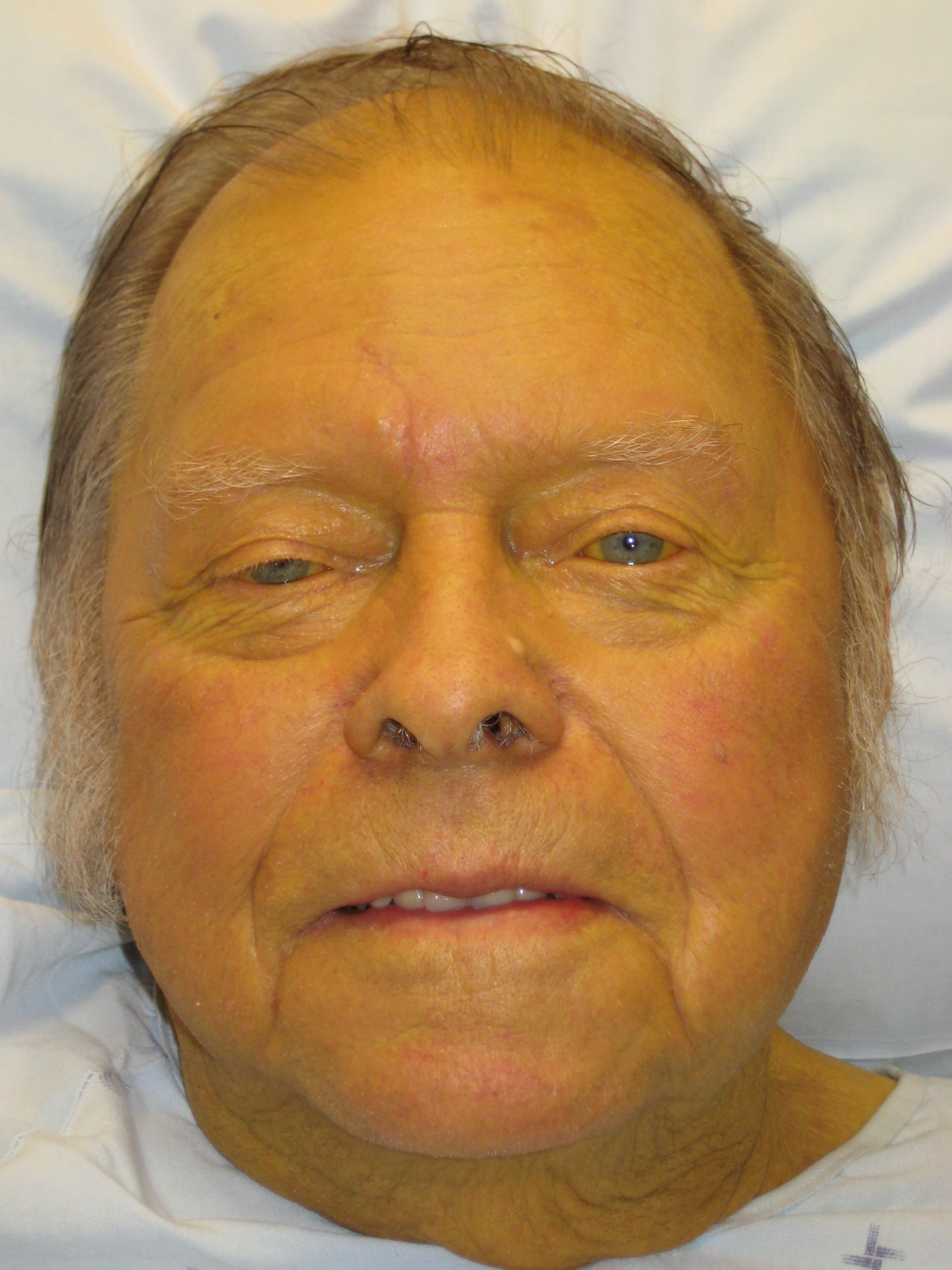
Jaundice can be a symptom, due to biliary obstruction from a pancreatic tumor.

Since pancreatic cancer rarely causes recognizable symptoms in its early stages, the disease is typically not diagnosed until tumors are large or have spread beyond the pancreas. The first symptom that most people notice is jaundice (yellowing of the skin and eyes) as the tumor grows large enough to block the bile duct, causing a buildup of yellow bilirubin in the body. People with jaundice can also have noticeably dark urine, light-colored or gray stools, and itchy skin.

A blocked bile duct can also cause the gallbladder to enlarge, which can sometimes be felt as a swollen lump just under the ribs on the right side. Tumors can also start to press on nearby organs, causing pain in the upper abdomen or back. Tumors that press on the stomach can result in nausea, vomiting, and pain that worsens after eating. Damage to the pancreas as tumors grow can reduce the organ's ability to make insulin resulting in diabetes, which typically manifests as increased thirst, hunger, and frequency of urination.

People with pancreatic cancer often experience general whole-body symptoms, most commonly fatigue and reduced appetite leading to unintended weight loss. Pancreatic cancer, as well as some other cancers, can increase one's risk of blood clots. Clots of the blood vessels under the skin (superficial thrombophlebitis) cause pain, redness, and swelling at the clot sites.

Clots can seem to resolve on their own, then reappear at nearby sites, called migratory thrombophlebitis or Trousseau's syndrome. Clots in larger blood vessels deeper in the body (called deep vein thromboses) cause pain and swelling of the affected body area. Clots in the blood vessels of the lung (called pulmonary embolism) can cause chest pain and difficulty breathing.

=== Metastastic disease ===
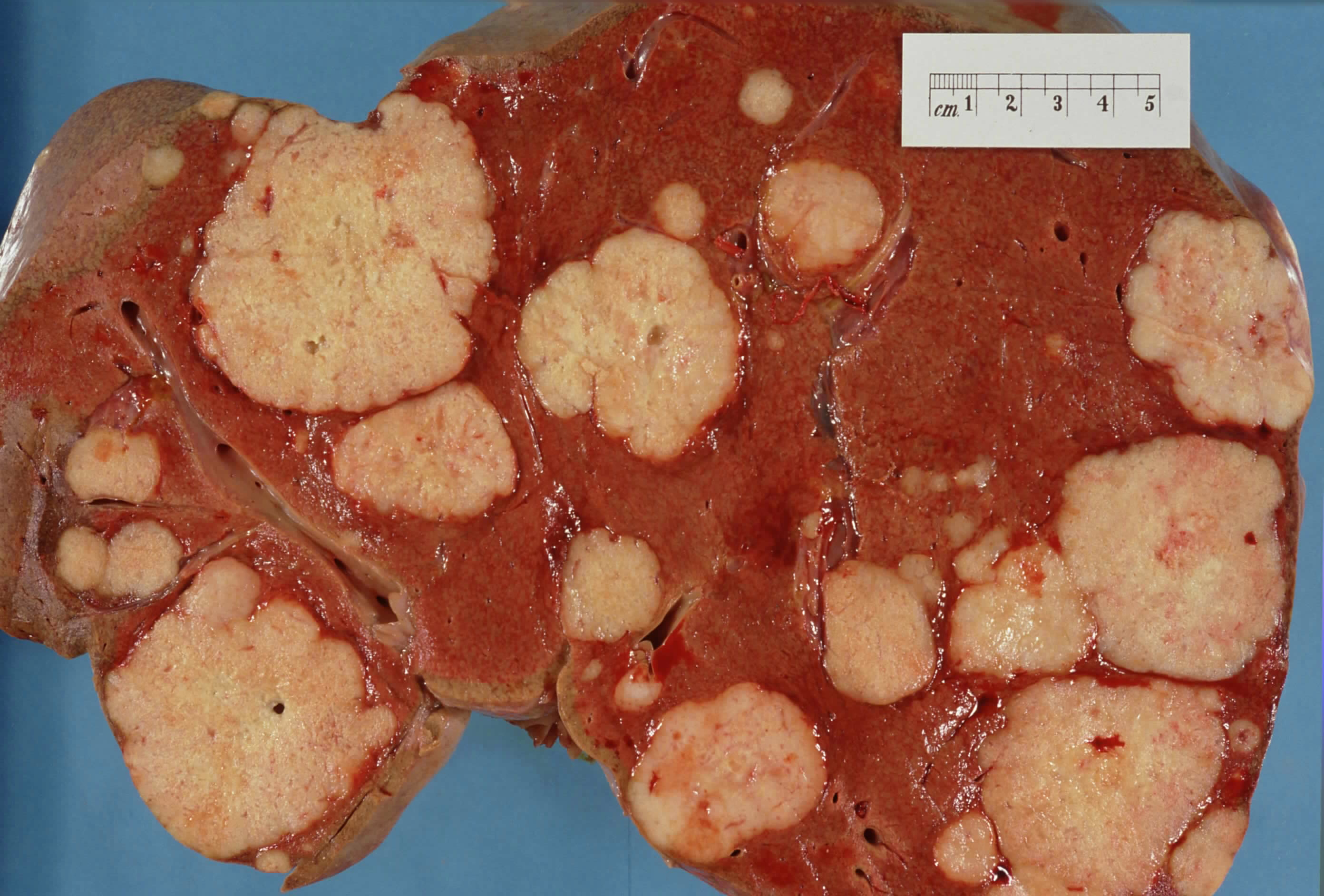
A cross-section of a human liver, at autopsy, showing many large pale tumor deposits, that are secondary tumors derived from pancreatic cancer

Signs and symptoms of pancreatic cancer can also be due to the spread of tumors to nearby lymph nodes or other organs. Spread to lymph nodes can cause lymph node enlargement that can be felt over the skin, most prominently in the left-side lower neck (called Virchow's node) or near the navel, called Sister Mary Joseph's node.

The metastasis of pancreatic cancer to other organs may also cause symptoms. Typically, pancreatic cancer spreads to the liver, lungs, peritoneum (tissue layer that envelopes abdominal organs), and less frequently to the bones.

Cancers in the pancreas may also be secondary cancers that have spread from other parts of the body. This is uncommon, found in only about 2% of cases of pancreatic cancer. Kidney cancer is by far the most common cancer to spread to the pancreas, followed by colorectal cancer, and then cancers of the skin, breast, and lung. Surgery may be performed on the pancreas in such cases, whether in hope of a cure or to alleviate symptoms.

== Risk factors ==
Risk factors for pancreatic adenocarcinoma include:

- The major preventable risk factor for pancreatic cancer is cigarette smoking, which causes around 25% of cases. Current smokers are around twice as likely to develop pancreatic cancer as those who have never smoked. The risk increases with the number of cigarettes smoked, with those who smoke over 35 cigarettes a day three times as likely to develop pancreatic cancer as those who never smoked. The risk declines after smoking cessation, returning to the level of those who never smoked within 10 to 20 years. Large studies have not found increased risk of pancreatic cancer in those exposed to secondhand smoke.
- Obesity – a body mass index greater than 35 increases relative risk by about half.
- Family history – 5–10% of pancreatic cancer cases have an inherited component, where people have a family history of pancreatic cancer. The risk escalates greatly if more than one first-degree relative had the disease, and more modestly if they developed it before the age of 50. Most of the genes involved have not been identified. Hereditary pancreatitis gives a greatly increased lifetime risk of pancreatic cancer of 30–40% to the age of 70. Screening for early pancreatic cancer may be offered to individuals with hereditary pancreatitis on a research basis. Some people may choose to have their pancreas surgically removed to prevent cancer from developing in the future.

Pancreatic cancer has been associated with these other rare hereditary syndromes: Peutz–Jeghers syndrome due to mutations in the STK11 tumor suppressor gene (very rare, but a very strong risk factor); dysplastic nevus syndrome (or familial atypical multiple mole and melanoma syndrome, FAMMM-PC) due to mutations in the CDKN2A tumor suppressor gene; autosomal recessive ATM and autosomal dominantly inherited mutations in the BRCA2 and PALB2 genes; hereditary non-polyposis colon cancer (Lynch syndrome); and familial adenomatous polyposis. PanNETs have been associated with multiple endocrine neoplasia type 1 (MEN1) and von Hippel Lindau syndromes.

- Chronic pancreatitis appears to almost triple risk, and as with diabetes, new-onset pancreatitis may be a symptom of a tumor. The risk of pancreatic cancer in individuals with familial pancreatitis is particularly high.
- Diabetes mellitus is a risk factor for pancreatic cancer and (as noted in the Signs and symptoms section) new-onset diabetes may also be an early sign of the disease. People who have been diagnosed with type 2 diabetes for longer than 10 years may have a 50% increased risk, as compared with individuals without diabetes.
- Specific types of food (as distinct from obesity) have not been clearly shown to increase the risk of pancreatic cancer. Dietary factors for which some evidence shows slightly increased risk include processed meat, red meat, and meat cooked at very high temperatures (e.g. by frying, broiling, or grilling).

=== Alcohol ===
Drinking alcohol excessively is a major cause of chronic pancreatitis, which in turn predisposes to pancreatic cancer, but considerable research has failed to firmly establish alcohol consumption as a direct risk factor for pancreatic cancer. Overall, the association is consistently weak and the majority of studies have found no association, with smoking a strong confounding factor. The evidence is stronger for a link with heavy drinking, of at least six drinks per day.

== Pathophysiology ==
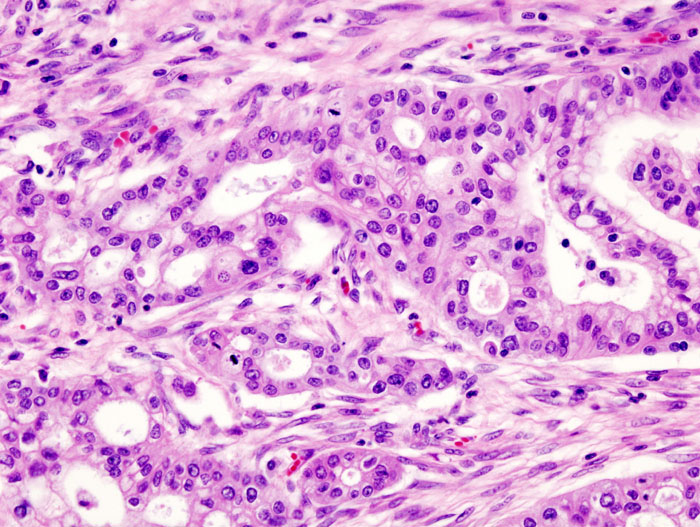
A micrograph of pancreatic ductal adenocarcinoma (the most common type of pancreatic cancer), H&E stain

=== Precancerous lesions ===
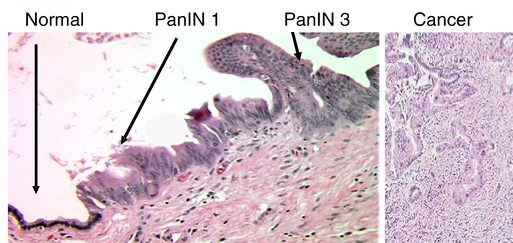
Micrographs of normal pancreas, pancreatic intraepithelial neoplasia (precursors to pancreatic carcinoma) and pancreatic carcinoma, H&E stain

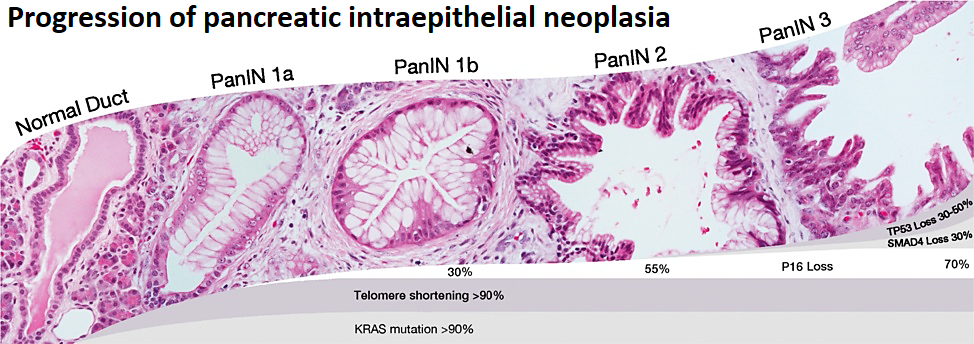
Progression of pancreatic intraepithelial neoplasia, including mutations

Exocrine cancers are thought to arise from several types of precancerous lesions within the pancreas, but these lesions do not always progress to cancer, and the increased numbers detected as a byproduct of the increasing use of CT scans for other reasons are not all treated. Apart from pancreatic serous cystadenomas, which are almost always benign, four types of precancerous lesion are recognized.

The first is pancreatic intraepithelial neoplasia (PanIN). These lesions are microscopic abnormalities in the pancreas and are often found in autopsies of people with no diagnosed cancer. These lesions may progress from low to high grade and then to a tumor. More than 90% of cases at all grades carry a faulty KRAS gene, while in grades 2 and 3, damage to three further genes – CDKN2A (p16), p53, and SMAD4 – are increasingly often found.

A second type is the intraductal papillary mucinous neoplasm (IPMN). These are macroscopic lesions, which are found in about 2% of all adults. This rate rises to about 10% by age 70. These lesions have about a 25% risk of developing into invasive cancer. They may have KRAS gene mutations (40–65% of cases) and in the GNAS Gs alpha subunit and RNF43, affecting the Wnt signaling pathway. Even if removed surgically, a considerably increased risk remains of pancreatic cancer developing subsequently.

The third type, pancreatic mucinous cystic neoplasm (MCN), mainly occurs in women, and may remain benign or progress to cancer. If these lesions become large, cause symptoms, or have suspicious features, they can usually be successfully removed by surgery.

A fourth type of cancer that arises in the pancreas is the intraductal tubulopapillary neoplasm. This type was recognised by the WHO in 2010 and constitutes about 1–3% of all pancreatic neoplasms. Mean age at diagnosis is 61 years (range 35–78 years). About 50% of these lesions become invasive. Diagnosis depends on histology, as these lesions are very difficult to differentiate from other lesions on either clinical or radiological grounds.

=== Invasive cancer ===
The genetic events found in ductal adenocarcinoma have been well characterized, and complete exome sequencing has been done for the common types of tumor. Four genes have each been found to be mutated in the majority of adenocarcinomas: KRAS (in 95% of cases), CDKN2A (also in 95%), TP53 (75%), and SMAD4 (55%). The last of these is especially associated with a poor prognosis. SWI/SNF mutations/deletions occur in about 10–15% of the adenocarcinomas.

The genetic alterations in several other types of pancreatic cancer and precancerous lesions have also been researched. Transcriptomics analyses and mRNA sequencing for the common forms of pancreatic cancer have found that 75% of human genes are expressed in the tumors, with some 200 genes more specifically expressed in pancreatic cancer as compared to other tumor types.

Pancreatic ductal adenocarcinoma cancer cells are known to secrete immunosuppressive cytokines, creating a tumor microenvironment that inhibits immune detection and blocks anti-cancer immunity. Cancer associated fibroblasts secrete fibrous tissue (desmoplasia) consisting of matrix metalloproteinases and hyaluronan which blocks the host's CD8+ T-cells from reaching the tumor. Tumor associated macrophages, neutrophils and regulatory T-cells secrete cytokines and work to create a tumor microenvironment that promotes cancer growth.

=== PanNETs ===
The genes often found mutated in pancreatic neuroendocrine tumors (PanNETs) are different from those in exocrine pancreatic cancer. For example, KRAS mutation is normally absent. Instead, hereditary MEN1 gene mutations give risk to MEN1 syndrome, in which primary tumors occur in two or more endocrine glands. About 40–70% of people born with a MEN1 mutation eventually develop a PanNet. Other genes that are frequently mutated include DAXX, mTOR, and ATRX.

== Diagnosis ==
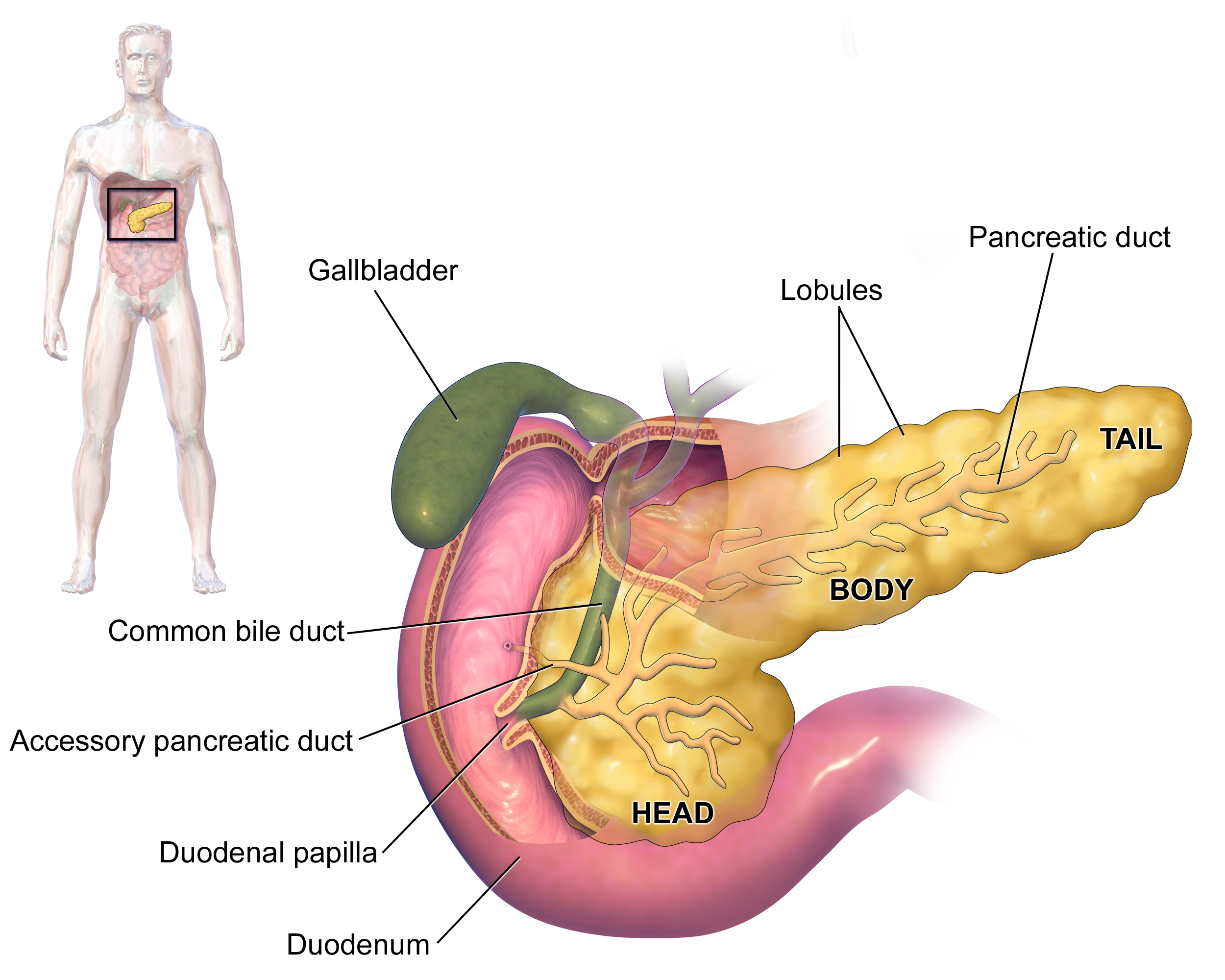
The head, body, and tail of the pancreas: The stomach is faded out in this image to show the entire pancreas, of which the body and tail lie behind the stomach, and the neck partially behind.

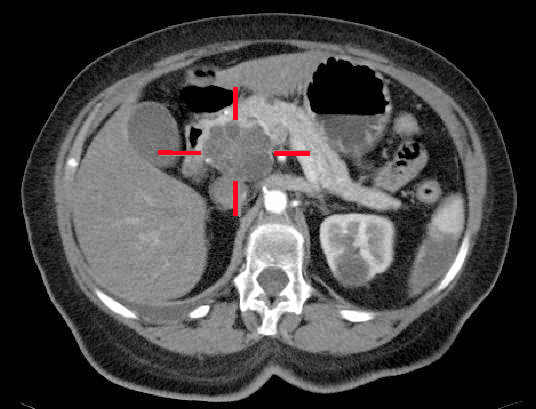
An axial CT image with IV contrast and added color: Cross lines towards top left surround a macrocystic adenocarcinoma of the pancreatic head.

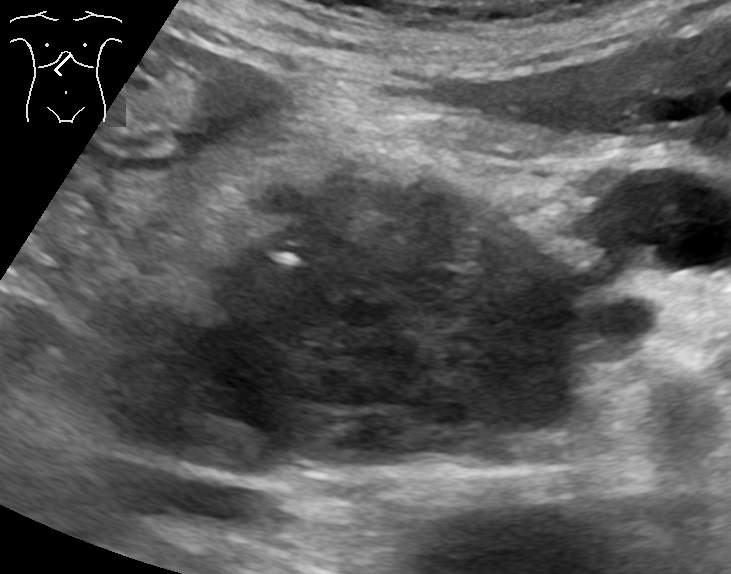
Abdominal ultrasonography of pancreatic cancer (presumably adenocarcinoma), with a dilated pancreatic duct to the right

Medical imaging techniques, such as computed tomography (CT scan) and endoscopic ultrasound (EUS) are used both to confirm the diagnosis and to help decide whether the tumor can be surgically removed (its "resectability"). On contrast CT scan, pancreatic cancer typically shows a gradually increasing radiocontrast uptake, rather than a fast washout as seen in a normal pancreas or a delayed washout as seen in chronic pancreatitis.

Magnetic resonance imaging and positron emission tomography may also be used, and magnetic resonance cholangiopancreatography may be useful in some cases. Abdominal ultrasound is less sensitive and will miss small tumors, but can identify cancers that have spread to the liver and build-up of fluid in the peritoneal cavity (ascites). It may be used for a quick and cheap first examination before other techniques.

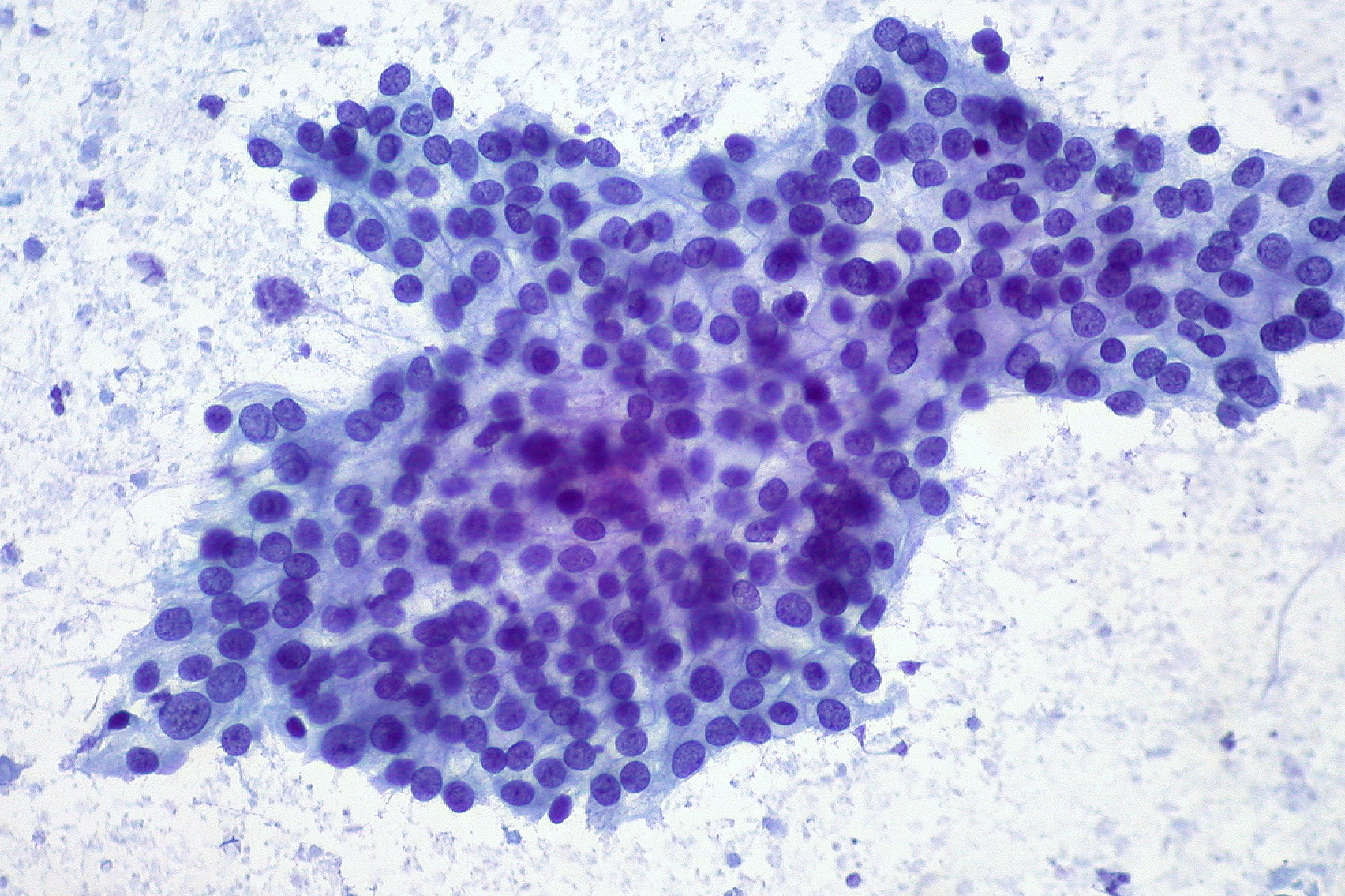
Fine needle aspiration of well-differentiated pancreatic adenocarcinoma, showing a flat sheet with prominent honeycombing. The disorganization, nuclear overlapping, and lack of uniform nuclear spacing provides a clue that this is adenocarcinoma (as opposed to non-neoplastic duct epithelium).

A biopsy by fine needle aspiration, often guided by endoscopic ultrasound, may be used where there is uncertainty over the diagnosis, but a histologic diagnosis is not usually required for removal of the tumor by surgery to go ahead.

Liver function tests can show a combination of results indicative of bile duct obstruction (raised conjugated bilirubin, γ-glutamyl transpeptidase and alkaline phosphatase levels). CA19-9 (carbohydrate antigen 19.9) is a tumor marker that is frequently elevated in pancreatic cancer. However, it lacks sensitivity and specificity, not least because 5% of people lack the Lewis (a) antigen and cannot produce CA19-9. It has a sensitivity of 80% and specificity of 73% in detecting pancreatic adenocarcinoma, and is used for following known cases rather than diagnosis.

All those with pancreatic cancer require genetic testing as high risk oncogenic mutations may provide prognostic information and certain mutations with high risk features require first degree relatives to undergo genetic testing as well.

=== Histopathology ===
The most common form of pancreatic cancer (adenocarcinoma) is typically characterized by moderately to poorly differentiated glandular structures on microscopic examination. There is typically considerable desmoplasia or formation of a dense fibrous stroma or structural tissue consisting of a range of cell types (including myofibroblasts, macrophages, lymphocytes and mast cells) and deposited material (such as type I collagen and hyaluronic acid).

This creates a tumor microenvironment that is short of blood vessels (hypovascular) and so of oxygen (tumor hypoxia). It is thought that this prevents many chemotherapy drugs from reaching the tumor, as one factor making the cancer especially hard to treat.

Cancer type	Relative incidence	Microscopy findings	Micrograph	Immunohistochemistry markers	Genetic alterations
Pancreatic ductal adenocarcinoma (PDAC)	90%	Glands and desmoplasia		Aberrant p53; SMAD4 loss; MUC1; MSLN; CA19-9	p53; SMAD4; KRAS; p16
Pancreatic acinar cell carcinoma (ACC)	1% to 2%	Granular appearance		Trypsin; Chymotrypsin; Lipase	p53; SMAD4; APC; ARID1A; GNAS
Solid pseudopapillary tumor		Discohesive tumor nests surrounded by thin fibrous bands.	Low and high magnification	β-catenin (aberrant nuclear expression); p120 (cytoplasmic stain)	Point mutation in exon 3 of β-catenin gene
Adenosquamous carcinoma	1% to 4%	Combination of gland-like cells and squamous epithelial cells.		Positive for: CK5/6; CK7; p63; Negative for: CK20; p16; p53	KRAS; p53
Pancreatic neuroendocrine tumor	5%	Multiple nests of tumor cells	Gastrinoma	Chromogranin; Synaptophysin	MEN1; DAXX/ATRX
Pre-cancer below for comparison:
Precancer: Intraductal papillary mucinous neoplasm (IPMN)	3%	Mucinous epithelial cells. Growth within the pancreatic ducts.		Mucin 5AC	KRAS; GNAS

=== Staging ===
==== Exocrine cancers ====
Pancreatic cancer is usually staged following a CT scan. The most widely used cancer staging system for pancreatic cancer is the one formulated by the American Joint Committee on Cancer (AJCC) together with the Union for International Cancer Control (UICC). The AJCC-UICC staging system designates four main overall stages, ranging from early to advanced disease, based on TNM classification of Tumor size, spread to lymph Nodes, and Metastasis.

To help decide treatment, the tumors are also divided into three broader categories based on whether surgical removal seems possible: in this way, tumors are judged to be "resectable", "borderline resectable", or "unresectable". When the disease is still in an early stage (AJCC-UICC stages I and II), without spread to large blood vessels or distant organs such as the liver or lungs, surgical resection of the tumor can normally be performed, if the patient is willing to undergo this major operation and is thought to be sufficiently fit.

The AJCC-UICC staging system allows distinction between stage III tumors that are judged to be "borderline resectable" (where surgery is technically feasible because the celiac axis and superior mesenteric artery are still free) and those that are "unresectable" (due to more locally advanced disease); in terms of the more detailed TNM classification, these two groups correspond to T3 and T4 respectively.

Pancreatic cancer staging (TNM classification)

Stage T1 pancreatic cancer

Stage T2 pancreatic cancer

Stage T3 pancreatic cancer

Stage T4 pancreatic cancer

Pancreatic cancer in nearby lymph nodes – Stage N1

Pancreatic cancer metastasized – stage M1

Locally advanced adenocarcinomas have spread into neighboring organs, which may be any of the following (in roughly decreasing order of frequency): the duodenum, stomach, transverse colon, spleen, adrenal gland, or kidney. Very often they also spread to the important blood or lymphatic vessels and nerves that run close to the pancreas, making surgery far more difficult. Typical sites for metastatic spread (stage IV disease) are the liver, peritoneal cavity and lungs, all of which occur in 50% or more of fully advanced cases.

==== PanNETs ====
The 2010 WHO classification of tumors of the digestive system grades all the pancreatic neuroendocrine tumors (PanNETs) into three categories, based on their degree of cellular differentiation (from "NET G1" through to the poorly differentiated "NET G3"). The U.S. National Comprehensive Cancer Network recommends use of the same AJCC-UICC staging system as pancreatic adenocarcinoma. Using this scheme, the stage-by-stage outcomes for PanNETs are dissimilar to those of the exocrine cancers. A different TNM system for PanNETs has been proposed by the European Neuroendocrine Tumor Society.

== Prevention and screening ==
Apart from not smoking, the American Cancer Society recommends keeping a healthy weight, and increasing consumption of fruits, vegetables, and whole grains, while decreasing consumption of red and processed meat, although there is no consistent evidence this will prevent or reduce pancreatic cancer specifically. A 2014 review of research concluded that there was evidence that consumption of citrus fruits and curcumin reduced risk of pancreatic cancer, while there was possibly a beneficial effect from whole grains, folate, selenium, and non-fried fish.

In the general population, screening of large groups is not considered effective and may be harmful as of 2019, although newer techniques, and the screening of tightly targeted groups, are being evaluated. Nevertheless, regular screening with endoscopic ultrasound and MRI/CT imaging is recommended for those at high risk from inherited genetics.

A 2019 meta-analysis found that use of aspirin might be negatively associated with the incidence risk of pancreatic cancer, but found no significant relationship with pancreatic cancer mortality.

== Management ==
=== Exocrine cancer ===
A key assessment that is made after diagnosis is whether surgical removal of the tumor is possible (see Staging), as this is the only cure for this cancer. Whether or not surgical resection can be offered depends on how much the cancer has spread. The exact location of the tumor is also a significant factor, and CT can show how it relates to the major blood vessels passing close to the pancreas. The general health of the person must also be assessed, though age in itself is not an obstacle to surgery.

Chemotherapy and, to a lesser extent, radiotherapy are likely to be offered to most people, whether or not surgery is possible. Specialists advise that the management of pancreatic cancer should be in the hands of a multidisciplinary team including specialists in several aspects of oncology, and is, therefore, best conducted in larger centers.

==== Surgery ====
Parts of the body removed in Whipple's operation

Surgery with the intention of a cure is only possible in around one-fifth (20%) of new cases. Although CT scans help, in practice it can be difficult to determine whether the tumor can be fully removed (its "resectability"), and it may only become apparent during surgery that it is not possible to successfully remove the tumor without damaging other vital tissues. Whether or not surgical resection can be offered depends on various factors, including the precise extent of local anatomical adjacency to, or involvement of, the venous or arterial blood vessels, as well as surgical expertise and a careful consideration of projected post-operative recovery. The age of the person is not in itself a reason not to operate, but their general performance status needs to be adequate for a major operation.

One particular feature that is evaluated is the encouraging presence, or discouraging absence, of a clear layer or plane of fat creating a barrier between the tumor and the vessels. Traditionally, an assessment is made of the tumor's proximity to major venous or arterial vessels, in terms of "abutment" (defined as the tumor touching no more than half a blood vessel's circumference without any fat to separate it), "encasement" (when the tumor encloses most of the vessel's circumference), or full vessel involvement. A resection that includes encased sections of blood vessels may be possible in some cases, particularly if preliminary neoadjuvant therapy is feasible, using chemotherapy and/or radiotherapy.

Even when the operation appears to have been successful, cancerous cells are often found around the edges ("margins") of the removed tissue, when a pathologist examines them microscopically (this will always be done), indicating the cancer has not been entirely removed. Furthermore, cancer stem cells are usually not evident microscopically, and if they are present they may continue to develop and spread. An exploratory laparoscopy (a small, camera-guided surgical procedure) may therefore be performed to gain a clearer idea of the outcome of a full operation.

How the pancreas and bowel are joined back together after a Whipple's operation

For cancers involving the head of the pancreas, the Whipple procedure is the most commonly attempted curative surgical treatment. This is a major operation which involves removing the pancreatic head and the curve of the duodenum together ("pancreato-duodenectomy"), making a bypass for food from the stomach to the jejunum ("gastro-jejunostomy") and attaching a loop of jejunum to the cystic duct to drain bile ("cholecysto-jejunostomy"). It can be performed only if the person is likely to survive major surgery and if the cancer is localized without invading local structures or metastasizing. It can, therefore, be performed only in a minority of cases. Cancers of the tail of the pancreas can be resected using a procedure known as a distal pancreatectomy, which often also entails removal of the spleen. Nowadays, this can often be done using minimally invasive surgery.

Various techniques exist for reconstructing the pancreas after a Whipple procedure, with the aim of reducing complications such as postoperative pancreatic fistula. A Cochrane review comparing duct-to-mucosa pancreaticojejunostomy with other anastomosis techniques found very low-certainty evidence and no clear differences in fistula rates, mortality, or other major complications.

Different approaches are also used for reconnecting the stomach to the small intestine after a Whipple procedure. A Cochrane review comparing antecolic versus retrocolic routes for the gastrojejunostomy found no clear difference in delayed gastric emptying, mortality, or other major complications.

Although curative surgery no longer entails the very high death rates that occurred until the 1980s, a high proportion of people (about 30–45%) still have to be treated for a post-operative sickness that is not caused by the cancer itself. The most common complication of surgery is difficulty in emptying the stomach. Certain more limited surgical procedures may also be used to ease symptoms (see Palliative care): for instance, if the cancer is invading or compressing the duodenum or colon. In such cases, bypass surgery might overcome the obstruction and improve quality of life but is not intended as a cure.

The extent of lymph node removal during pancreatic cancer surgery remains a subject of debate. A Cochrane review comparing standard versus extended lymphadenectomy found no clear evidence that more extensive lymph node removal improves overall survival or reduces cancer recurrence, but it was associated with increased operative time and a greater risk of complications.

==== Chemotherapy ====
After surgery, adjuvant chemotherapy with gemcitabine or 5-FU can be offered if the person is sufficiently fit, after a recovery period of one to two months. In people not suitable for curative surgery, chemotherapy may be used to extend life or improve its quality. Before surgery, neoadjuvant chemotherapy or chemoradiotherapy may be used in cases that are considered to be "borderline resectable" (see Staging) in order to reduce the cancer to a level where surgery could be beneficial. In other cases neoadjuvant therapy remains controversial, because it delays surgery.

Gemcitabine was approved by the United States Food and Drug Administration (FDA) in 1997, after a clinical trial reported improvements in quality of life and a five-week improvement in median survival duration in people with advanced pancreatic cancer. This was the first chemotherapy drug approved by the FDA primarily for a nonsurvival clinical trial endpoint. Chemotherapy using gemcitabine alone was the standard for about a decade, as a number of trials testing it in combination with other drugs failed to demonstrate significantly better outcomes. However, the combination of gemcitabine with erlotinib was found to increase survival modestly, and erlotinib was licensed by the FDA for use in pancreatic cancer in 2005.

The FOLFIRINOX chemotherapy regimen using four drugs was found more effective than gemcitabine, but with substantial side effects, thus only suitable for people with good performance status. This is also true of protein-bound paclitaxel (nab-paclitaxel), which was licensed by the FDA in 2013 for use with gemcitabine in pancreas cancer. By the end of 2013, either singular FOLFIRINOX or gemcitabine in combination with nab-paclitaxel^{(Note:)} were regarded as good choices for those able to tolerate the side-effects, and singular gemcitabine remained an effective option for those who were not. Regimen changes during this period only increased survival times by a few months.

A 2023 meta-analysis found clinical evidence that the FOLFIRINOX regimen provided better overall survival (OS) than gemcitabine plus nab-paclitaxel; both increased the risk of serious grade 3/4 adverse events. An assemblage of 51 studies encompassing 11,333 persons provided comparison of seven different chemotherapy regimens. The previously promoted gemcitabine plus nab-paclitaxel regimen offered insignificant OS or quality of life (QoL) improvement (66% risk of death at 12 months (RoD) versus control group's 63%). Gemcitabine plus taxane improved those results, bettering both OS and QoL (64% RoD versus control group's 77%). FOLFIRINOX offered the best outcome improving OS and forestalling QoL deterioration (52% RoD versus control group's 77%).

Treatment regimens continue to evolve as pharmacology advances. Clinical trials are often conducted to assess novel adjuvant therapies.

In 2026, Adjuvant systemic chemotherapy after surgery is recommended for eligible patients after their recovery from resection. For medically fit patients, modified FOLFIRINOX is commonly used, while gemcitabine-based regimens remain options for those who are not suitable for intensive multi-agent chemotherapy.

Neoadjuvant chemotherapy with or without chemoradiation is recommended for borderline resectable pancreatic cancer, as per multiple consensus guidelines, though the optimal regimen is still under investigation.Standard first-line systemic therapy for metastatic or recurrent pancreatic adenocarcinoma includes FOLFIRINOX, NALIRIFOX, and gemcitabine plus nab-paclitaxel for selected patients, while gemcitabine alone is an option for those unsuitable for combination chemotherapy.

A regimen known as NALIRIFOX, comprising liposomal irinotecan with oxaliplatin, fluorouracil, and leucovorin, was approved by the United States Food and Drug Administration in 2024 for first-line treatment of metastatic pancreatic adenocarcinoma.

==== Radiotherapy ====
The role of radiotherapy as an auxiliary (adjuvant) treatment after potentially curative surgery has been controversial since the 1980s. In the early 2000s the European Study Group for Pancreatic Cancer Research (ESPAC) showed prognostic superiority of adjuvant chemotherapy over chemoradiotherapy. The European Society for Medical Oncology recommends that adjuvant radiotherapy should only be used for people enrolled in clinical trials. However, there is a continuing tendency for clinicians in the US to be more ready to use adjuvant radiotherapy than those in Europe. Many clinical trials have tested a variety of treatment combinations since the 1980s, but have failed to settle the matter conclusively.

Radiotherapy may form part of treatment to attempt to shrink a tumor to a resectable state, but its use on unresectable tumors remains controversial as there are conflicting results from clinical trials. The preliminary results of one trial, presented in 2013, "markedly reduced enthusiasm" for its use on locally advanced tumors.

==== Targeted therapy ====
For biomarker-selected subgroups of pancreatic adenocarcinoma, targeted therapy is mainly used. Maintenance olaparib may be considered for patients with metastatic pancreatic adenocarcinoma and germline BRCA1 or BRCA2 variants whose disease has not progressed after first-line platinum-based chemotherapy. Median progression-free survival was 7.4 months with olaparib compared with 3.8 months with placebo in the POLO trial, although median overall survival was not significantly improved.

For adults with advanced, unresectable, or metastatic pancreatic adenocarcinoma harboring an NRG1 gene fusion, zenocutuzumab-zbco was approved by the FDA in 2024 for those whose disease had progressed on or after prior systemic therapy, marking the first FDA approval for a specific systemic therapy for pancreatic adenocarcinoma with an NRG1 gene fusion. With NRG1 gene fusions, zenocutuzumab-zbco showed promising results in clinical trials .

Patients with metastatic PDAC have a 5-year survival of only 3% regardless of treatment. Daraxonrasib is a RAS inhibitor that unlike other RAS inhibitors inhibits all three key members of the Ras superfamily, i.e., KRAS, HRAS, and NRAS. Certain mutations in any one of these RAS proteins appear responsible for more than 90% of PDACs. In 2025, daraxonrasib received a breakthrough therapy designation from the U.S. FDA based on phase I and II (see Phases of clinical research) studies conducted by Revolution Medicines that found daraxonrasib to be effective in treating metastatic PDAC. The company reported median survival of 13.2 months with daraxonrasib vs. 6.7 months with standard chemotherapy. A more recent study examined the effects of daraxonrasib in 35 previously untreated patients with metastatic PDAC. Of the 35 patients, 34 showed control of their disease. PDAC tumors injected into C57BL/6 mice grew rapidly with the mice requiring euthanasia 20-40 days after implantation. C57BL/6 mice implanted with these tumors that were treated with daily, oral daraxonrasib (20 milligram per kilogram body weight) had significantly longer survival yet nonetheless died due to the apparent tumors becoming resistant to daraxonrasib. In contrast, the tumors in mice treated with the same dose of daraxonrasib plus afatinib and SD36 underwent rapid apoptotic cell death and complete tumor regression that endured for the study period of over 200 days. Treating with a combination of any two of the three drugs did not show this >200 day effect and the tumor implants treated with daraxonrasib did not respond to the subsequent addition of afatinib and SD36. These findings support studies on treating humans with PDAC tumors with daraxonrasib combined with other drugs.

==== Immunotherapy ====
In unselected pancreatic adenocarcinoma, immune checkpoint inhibitors have a limited role, but may be used for selected tumors with specific biomarkers such as microsatellite instability-high or mismatch repair-deficient solid tumors. The indication for pembrolizumab includes unresectable or metastatic cases that have progressed after prior treatment and have no satisfactory alternative treatment options.

==== Personalized mRNA vaccines ====
A 2025 study reports that a phase 1 clinical trial has found promising results for personalized mRNA vaccines as a potential treatment for pancreatic cancer. The trial involved 16 patients with resectable pancreatic cancer, who were monitored for up to four years. Between 2019 and 2021, participants underwent tumor removal surgery. Researchers then used genetic material from each patient's tumor to create customized mRNA vaccines, designed to help the immune system recognize and attack cancer cells. Patients also received standard treatment alongside the vaccine. Results showed that eight of the 16 participants developed T cells targeting their tumors, indicating an immune response to the vaccine.

=== PanNETs ===
Treatment of PanNETs, including the less common malignant types, may include a number of approaches. Some small tumors of less than 1 cm that are identified incidentally, for example on a CT scan performed for other purposes, may be followed by watchful waiting. This depends on the assessed risk of surgery which is influenced by the site of the tumor and the presence of other medical problems. Tumors within the pancreas only (localized tumors), or with limited metastases, for example to the liver, may be removed by surgery. The type of surgery depends on the tumor location, and the degree of spread to lymph nodes.

For localized tumors, the surgical procedure may be much less extensive than the types of surgery used to treat pancreatic adenocarcinoma described above, but otherwise surgical procedures are similar to those for exocrine tumors. The range of possible outcomes varies greatly; some types have a very high survival rate after surgery while others have a poor outlook. As all this group are rare, guidelines emphasize that treatment should be undertaken in a specialized center. Use of liver transplantation may be considered in certain cases of liver metastasis.

For functioning tumors, the somatostatin analog class of medications, such as octreotide, can reduce the excessive production of hormones. Lanreotide can slow tumor growth. If the tumor is not amenable to surgical removal and is causing symptoms, targeted therapy with everolimus or sunitinib can reduce symptoms and slow progression of the disease. Standard cytotoxic chemotherapy is generally not very effective for PanNETs, but may be used when other drug treatments fail to prevent the disease from progressing, or in poorly differentiated PanNET cancers.

Radiation therapy is occasionally used if there is pain due to anatomic extension, such as metastasis to bone. Some PanNETs absorb specific peptides or hormones, and these PanNETs may respond to nuclear medicine therapy with radiolabeled peptides or hormones such as iobenguane (iodine-131-MIBG). Radiofrequency ablation (RFA), cryoablation, and hepatic artery embolization may also be used.

=== Palliative care ===
Palliative care is medical care which focuses on treatment of symptoms from serious illness, such as cancer, and improving quality of life. Because pancreatic adenocarcinoma is usually diagnosed after it has progressed to an advanced stage, palliative care as a treatment of symptoms is often the only treatment possible.

Palliative care focuses not on treating the underlying cancer, but on treating symptoms such as pain or nausea, and can assist in decision-making, including when or if hospice care will be beneficial. Pain can be managed with medications such as opioids or through procedural intervention, by a nerve block on the celiac plexus (CPB). This alters or, depending on the technique used, destroys the nerves that transmit pain from the abdomen. CPB is a safe and effective way to reduce the pain, which generally reduces the need to use opioid painkillers, which have significant negative side effects.

Other symptoms or complications that can be treated with palliative surgery are obstruction by the tumor of the intestines or bile ducts. For the latter, which occurs in well over half of cases, a small metal tube called a stent may be inserted by endoscope to keep the ducts draining. Palliative care can also help treat depression that often comes with the diagnosis of pancreatic cancer.

Both surgery and advanced inoperable tumors often lead to digestive system disorders from a lack of the exocrine products of the pancreas (exocrine insufficiency). These can be treated by taking pancreatin which contains manufactured pancreatic enzymes, and is best taken with food. Difficulty in emptying the stomach (delayed gastric emptying) is common and can be a serious problem, involving hospitalization. Treatment may involve a variety of approaches, including draining the stomach by nasogastric aspiration and drugs called proton-pump inhibitors or H_{2} antagonists, which both reduce production of gastric acid. Medications like metoclopramide can also be used to clear stomach contents.

== Prognosis ==
Outcomes in pancreatic cancers according to clinical stage, as of 2014
Clinical stage	U.S. five-year survival (%) for 1992–1998 diagnoses	
Clinical stage	Exocrine pancreatic cancer	Neuroendocrine treated with surgery
IA / I	14	61
IB	12	
IIA / II	7	52
IIB	5	
III	3	41
IV	1	16

Pancreatic adenocarcinoma and the other less common exocrine cancers have a very poor prognosis, as they are normally diagnosed at a late stage when the cancer is already locally advanced or has spread to other parts of the body. Outcomes are much better for PanNETs: Many are benign and completely without clinical symptoms, and even those cases not treatable with surgery have an average five-year survival rate of 16%, although the outlook varies considerably according to the type.

For locally advanced and metastatic pancreatic adenocarcinomas, which together represent over 80% of cases, numerous trials comparing chemotherapy regimes have shown increased survival times, but not to more than one year. Overall five-year survival for pancreatic cancer in the US has improved from 2% in cases diagnosed in 1975–1977, and 4% in 1987–1989 diagnoses, to 6% in 2003–2009. In the less than 20% of cases of pancreatic adenocarcinoma with a diagnosis of a localized and small cancerous growth (less than 2 cm in Stage T1), about 20% of Americans survive to five years.

About 1500 genes are linked to outcomes in pancreatic adenocarcinoma. These include both unfavorable genes, where high expression is related to poor outcome, for example C-Met and MUC-1, and favorable genes where high expression is associated with better survival, for example the transcription factor PELP1.

== Epidemiology ==
Pancreatic cancer death rate, 2023

Deaths from pancreatic cancer per million persons in 2012 0–4 5–6 7–9 10–15 16–25 26–33 34–70 71–121 122–162 163–235

Pancreatic cancer is the 12th most commonly diagnosed cancer, and the sixth leading cause of cancer death. Around 1% of people develop pancreatic cancer in their lifetime.

In 2015, pancreatic cancers of all types resulted in 411,600 deaths globally. In 2014, an estimated 46,000 people in the US were expected to be diagnosed with pancreatic cancer and 40,000 to die of it. Although it accounts for only 2.5% of new cases, pancreatic cancer is responsible for 6% of cancer deaths each year. Pancreatic cancer is the fifth most-common cause of death from cancer in the United Kingdom, and the third most-common in the United States.

The risk of developing pancreatic cancer increases with age. Most cases occur after age 65, while cases before age 40 are uncommon. The disease is slightly more common in men than in women.

In the United States, the risk for African Americans is over 50% greater than for whites, but the rates in Africa and East Asia are much lower than those in North America or Europe. The United States, Central, and eastern Europe, and Argentina and Uruguay all have high rates.

=== PanNETs ===
The annual incidence of clinically recognized pancreatic neuroendocrine tumors (PanNETs) is low (about 5 per one million person-years) and is dominated by the non-functioning types. Somewhere between 45% and 90% of PanNETs are thought to be of the non-functioning types. Studies of autopsies have uncovered small PanNETs rather frequently, suggesting that the prevalence of tumors that remain inert and asymptomatic may be relatively high. Overall PanNETs are thought to account for about 1 to 2% of all pancreatic tumors. The definition and classification of PanNETs has changed over time, affecting what is known about their epidemiology and clinical relevance.

== History ==
=== Recognition and diagnosis ===
The earliest recognition of pancreatic cancer has been attributed to the 18th-century Italian scientist Giovanni Battista Morgagni, the historical father of modern-day anatomic pathology, who claimed to have traced several cases of cancer in the pancreas. Many 18th and 19th-century physicians were skeptical about the existence of the disease, given the similar appearance of pancreatitis. Some case reports were published in the 1820s and 1830s, and a genuine histopathologic diagnosis was eventually recorded by the American clinician Jacob Mendes Da Costa, who also doubted the reliability of Morgagni's interpretations. By the start of the 20th century, cancer of the head of the pancreas had become a well-established diagnosis.

Regarding the recognition of PanNETs, the possibility of cancer of the islet cells was initially suggested in 1888. The first case of hyperinsulinism due to a tumor of this type was reported in 1927. Recognition of a non-insulin-secreting type of PanNET is generally ascribed to the American surgeons, R. M. Zollinger and E. H. Ellison, who gave their names to Zollinger–Ellison syndrome, after postulating the existence of a gastrin-secreting pancreatic tumor in a report of two cases of unusually severe peptic ulcers published in 1955. In 2010, the WHO recommended that PanNETs be referred to as "neuroendocrine" rather than "endocrine" tumors.

Small precancerous neoplasms for many pancreatic cancers are being detected at greatly increased rates by modern medical imaging. One type, the intraductal papillary mucinous neoplasm (IPMN) was first described by Japanese researchers in 1982. It was noted in 2010 that: "For the next decade, little attention was paid to this report; however, over the subsequent 15 years, there has been a virtual explosion in the recognition of this tumor."

=== Surgery ===
The first reported partial pancreaticoduodenectomy was performed by the Italian surgeon Alessandro Codivilla in 1898, but the patient only survived 18 days before succumbing to complications. Early operations were compromised partly because of mistaken beliefs that people would die if their duodenum were removed, and also, at first, if the flow of pancreatic juices stopped. Later it was thought, also mistakenly, that the pancreatic duct could simply be tied up without serious adverse effects; in fact, it will very often leak later on. In 1907–1908, after some more unsuccessful operations by other surgeons, experimental procedures were tried on corpses by French surgeons.

In 1912 the German surgeon Walther Kausch was the first to remove large parts of the duodenum and pancreas together (en bloc). This was in Breslau, now Wrocław, in Poland. In 1918 it was demonstrated, in operations on dogs, that it is possible to survive even after complete removal of the duodenum, but no such result was reported in human surgery until 1935, when the American surgeon Allen Oldfather Whipple published the results of a series of three operations at Columbia Presbyterian Hospital in New York. Only one of the patients had the duodenum entirely removed, but he survived for two years before dying of metastasis to the liver.

The first operation was unplanned, as cancer was only discovered in the operating theater. Whipple's success showed the way for the future, but the operation remained a difficult and dangerous one until recent decades. He published several refinements to his procedure, including the first total removal of the duodenum in 1940, but he only performed a total of 37 operations.

The discovery in the late 1930s that vitamin K prevented bleeding with jaundice, and the development of blood transfusion as an everyday process, both improved post-operative survival, but about 25% of people never left hospital alive as late as the 1970s. In the 1970s a group of American surgeons wrote urging that the procedure was too dangerous and should be abandoned. Since then outcomes in larger centers have improved considerably, and mortality from the operation is often less than 4%.

In 2006 a report was published of a series of 1,000 consecutive pancreatico-duodenectomies performed by a single surgeon from Johns Hopkins Hospital between 1969 and 2003. The rate of these operations had increased steadily over this period, with only three of them before 1980, and the median operating time reduced from 8.8 hours in the 1970s to 5.5 hours in the 2000s, and mortality within 30 days or in hospital was only 1%. Another series of 2,050 operations at the Massachusetts General Hospital between 1941 and 2011 showed a similar picture of improvement.

== Research directions ==
Early-stage research on pancreatic cancer includes studies of genetics and early detection, treatment at different cancer stages, surgical strategies, and targeted therapies, such as inhibition of growth factors, immune therapies, and vaccines. Bile acids may have a role in the carcinogenesis of pancreatic cancer.

A key question is the timing of events as the disease develops and progresses – particularly the role of diabetes, and how and when the disease spreads. The knowledge that new onset of diabetes can be an early sign of the disease could facilitate timely diagnosis and prevention if a workable screening strategy can be developed. The European Registry of Hereditary Pancreatitis and Familial Pancreatic Cancer (EUROPAC) trial is aiming to determine whether regular screening is appropriate for people with a family history of the disease.

Keyhole surgery (laparoscopy) rather than Whipple's procedure, particularly in terms of recovery time, is being evaluated. Irreversible electroporation is a relatively novel ablation technique with potential for downstaging and prolonging survival in persons with locally advanced disease, especially for tumors in proximity to peri-pancreatic vessels without risk of vascular trauma.

Efforts are underway to develop new drugs, including those targeting molecular mechanisms for cancer onset, stem cells, and cell proliferation. A further approach involves the use of immunotherapy, such as oncolytic viruses. Galectin-specific mechanisms of the tumor microenvironment are under study.

Because of the highly hypoxic nature of the environment, Hypoxia-activated prodrugs such as CP-506 especially in combination with immunotherapy are also being studied.

The nanoparticles assist in the sustained and targeted release of a drug regimen to cancer/tumor-specific sites rather than affecting healthy cells, leading to negligible or no toxicity.

== See also ==
- Gastrointestinal cancer
- Pancreatic Cancer Action Network (organization in the US)
- Lustgarten Foundation for Pancreatic Cancer Research (organization in the US)
- List of people diagnosed with pancreatic cancer
- Pancreatitis
