= Hepatoid tumor =

Hepatoid tumor or hepatoid [adeno]carcinoma are terms for a number of uncommon or rare neoplasms in humans, named for a visual resemblance of the cells under the microscope to those of hepatocellular carcinoma, the most common form of liver cancer. They can arise in several parts of the body, and thus form sub-types of diseases such as stomach cancer and pancreatic cancer. The WHO defines "Hepatoid carcinoma" as "An adenocarcinoma with morphologic characteristics similar to hepatocellular carcinoma, arising from an anatomic site other than the liver".

In dogs it may refer to a Perianal gland tumor, based on a similar resemblance to healthy liver cells.
