= Pancreaticoduodenectomy =

Major surgical procedure involving the pancreas, duodenum, and other organs

- The pancreas, stomach, and bowel are joined back together after a pancreaticoduodenectomy
- Other names: Pancreatoduodenectomy, Duodenopancreatectomy, Whipple procedure, Kausch-Whipple procedure
- ICD-9-CM: 52.7
- MeSH: D016577

A pancreaticoduodenectomy, also known as a Whipple procedure, is a major surgical operation most often performed to remove cancerous tumours from the head of the pancreas. It is also used for the treatment of pancreatic or duodenal trauma, or chronic pancreatitis. Due to the shared blood supply of organs in the proximal gastrointestinal system, surgical removal of the head of the pancreas also necessitates removal of the duodenum, proximal jejunum, gallbladder, and, occasionally, part of the stomach.

== Anatomy involved in the procedure ==
The tissue removed during a pancreaticoduodenectomy

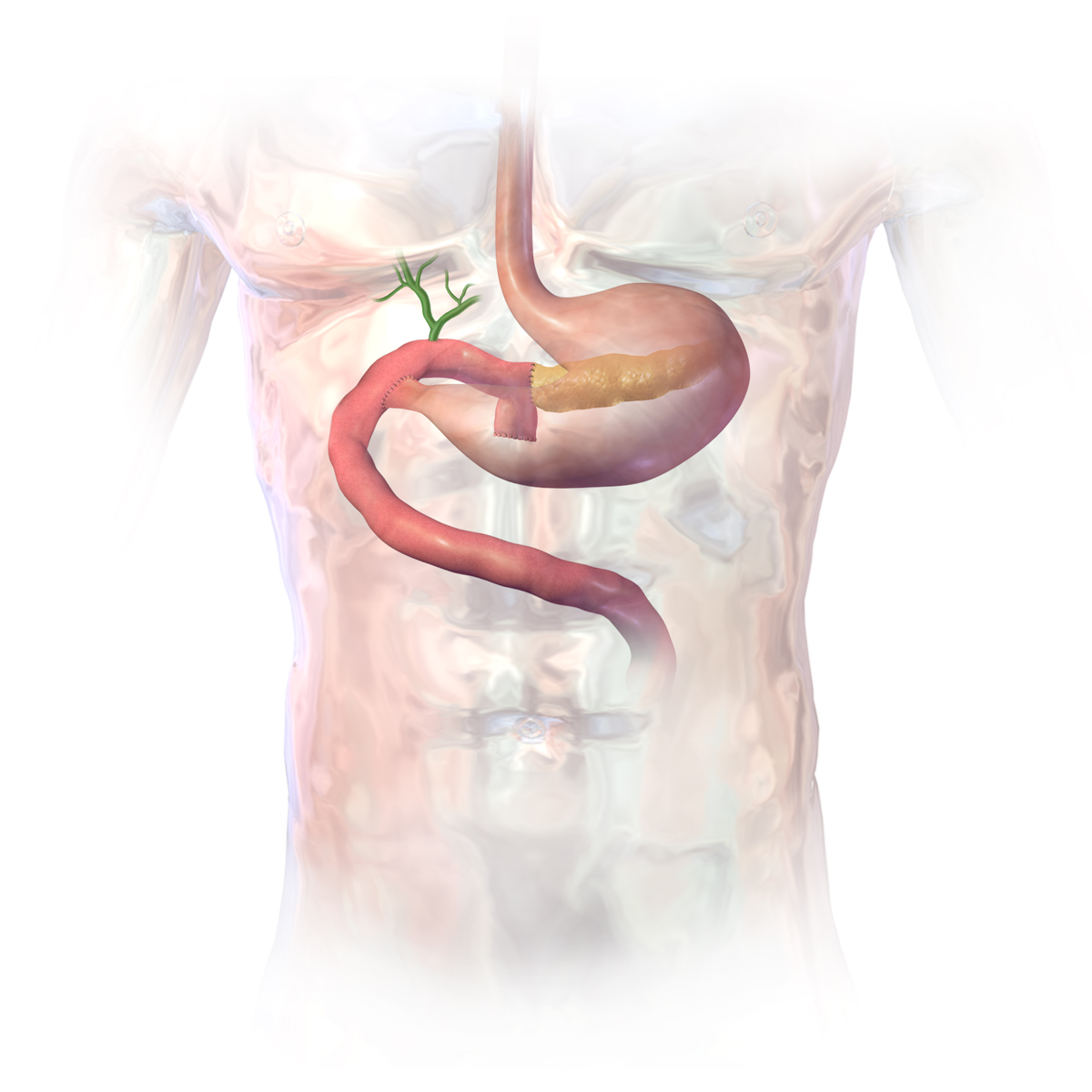
Whipple surgery

The most common technique of a pancreaticoduodenectomy consists of the en bloc removal of the distal segment (antrum) of the stomach, the first and second portions of the duodenum, the head of the pancreas, the common bile duct, and the gallbladder. Lymph nodes in the area are often removed during the operation as well (lymphadenectomy). However, not all lymph nodes are removed in the most common type of pancreaticoduodenectomy because studies showed that patients did not benefit from the more extensive surgery.

At the very beginning of the procedure, after the surgeons have gained access to the abdomen, the surfaces of the peritoneum and the liver are inspected for disease that has metastasized. This is an important first step as the presence of active metastatic disease is a contraindication to performing the operation.

The vascular supply of the pancreas is from the celiac artery via the superior pancreaticoduodenal artery and the superior mesenteric artery from the inferior pancreaticoduodenal artery. There are additional smaller branches given off by the right gastric artery which is also derived from the celiac artery. The reason for the removal of the duodenum along with the head of the pancreas is that they share the same arterial blood supply (the superior pancreaticoduodenal artery and inferior pancreaticoduodenal artery). These arteries run through the head of the pancreas so that both organs must be removed if the single blood supply is severed. If only the head of the pancreas were removed it would compromise blood flow to the duodenum, resulting in tissue necrosis.

While the blood supply to the liver is left intact, the common bile duct is removed. This means that while the liver remains with a good blood supply the surgeon must make a new connection to drain bile produced in the liver. This is done at the end of the surgery. The surgeon will make a new attachment between the pancreatic duct and the jejunum or stomach. During the surgery, a cholecystectomy is performed to remove the gallbladder. This portion is not done en bloc, as the gallbladder is removed separately.

Relevant nearby anatomy not removed during the procedure include the major vascular structures in the area: the portal vein, the superior mesenteric vein, and the superior mesenteric artery, the inferior vena cava. These structures are important to consider in this operation especially if done for resection of a tumor located in the head of the pancreas.

== Medical indications ==
Pancreaticoduodenectomy is most often performed as a curative treatment for periampullary cancer, which includes cancer of the bile duct, duodenum, ampulla or head of the pancreas. The shared blood supply of the pancreas, duodenum and common bile duct necessitates en bloc resection of these multiple structures. Other indications for pancreaticoduodenectomy include chronic pancreatitis, benign tumors of the pancreas, cancer metastatic to the pancreas, multiple endocrine neoplasia type 1 and gastrointestinal stromal tumors.

=== Pancreatic cancer ===
Pancreaticoduodenectomy is the only potentially curative intervention for malignant tumors of the pancreas. However, the majority of patients with pancreatic cancer present with metastatic or locally advanced un-resectable disease; thus only 15–20% of patients are candidates for the Whipple procedure. Surgery may follow neoadjuvant chemotherapy, which aims to shrink the tumor and increase the likelihood of complete resection. Post-operative death and complications associated with pancreaticoduodenectomy have become less common, with rates of post-operative mortality falling from 30-10% in the 1980s to less than 5% in the 2000s.

=== Ampullary cancer ===
Ampullary cancer arises from the lining of the ampulla of Vater.

=== Duodenal cancer ===
Duodenal cancer arises from the lining of the duodenal mucosa. Majority of duodenal cancers originate in the second part of the duodenum, where ampulla is located.

=== Cholangiocarcinoma ===
Cholangiocarcinoma, or cancer of the bile duct, is an indication for the Whipple procedure when the cancer is present in the distal biliary system, usually the common bile duct that drains into the duodenum. Depending on the location and extension of the cholangiocarcinoma, curative surgical resection may require hepatectomy, or removal of part of the liver, with or without pancreaticoduodenectomy.

=== Chronic pancreatitis ===
Treatment of chronic pancreatitis typically includes pain control and management of exocrine insufficiency. Intractable abdominal pain is the main surgical indication for surgical management of chronic pancreatitis. Removal of the head of the pancreas can relieve pancreatic duct obstruction associated with chronic pancreatitis.

=== Trauma ===
Damage to the pancreas and duodenum from blunt abdominal trauma is uncommon. In rare cases when this pattern of trauma has been reported, it has been caused by a lap seat belt in motor vehicle accidents. Pancreaticoduodenectomy has been performed when abdominal trauma has resulted in bleeding around the pancreas and duodenum, damage to the common bile duct, pancreatic leakage, or transection of the duodenum. Due to the rarity of this procedure in the treatment of trauma, there is no robust evidence regarding post-operative outcomes.

== Contraindications ==
In order to be considered for surgical removal, the tumor cannot encase more than 50% of any of the following vessels: the celiac artery, superior mesenteric artery, or inferior vena cava. In cases where less than 50% of the vessel is involved, vascular surgeons remove the involved portion of the vessel, and repair the residual artery or vein. Tumors are still borderline resectable even if they involve the superior mesenteric or portal veins, gastroduodenal artery, superior mesenteric vein or colon.

Metastatic disease is another contraindication to surgery. It most often occurs in the peritoneum, in the liver, and in the omentum. In order to determine if there are metastases, surgeons will inspect the abdomen at the beginning of the procedure after gaining access. Alternatively, they may perform a separate procedure called a diagnostic laparoscopy which involves insertion of a small camera through a small incision to look inside the abdomen. This may spare the patient the large abdominal incision that would occur if they were to undergo the initial part of a pancreaticoduodenectomy that was cancelled due to metastatic disease.

Further contraindications include encasement of major vessels (such as celiac artery, inferior vena cava, or superior mesenteric artery) as mentioned above.

== Surgical considerations ==
=== Pylorus-sparing pancreaticoduodenectomy ===
Clinical trials have failed to demonstrate significant survival benefits of total pancreatectomy, mostly because patients who submit to this operation tend to develop a particularly severe form of diabetes mellitus called brittle diabetes. Sometimes the pancreaticojejunostomy may not hold properly after the completion of the operation and infection may spread inside the patient. This may lead to another operation shortly thereafter in which the remainder of the pancreas (and sometimes the spleen) is removed to prevent further spread of infection and possible morbidity. In recent years the pylorus-preserving pancreaticoduodenectomy (also known as Traverso–Longmire procedure/PPPD) has been gaining popularity, especially among European surgeons. The main advantage of this technique is that the pylorus, and thus normal gastric emptying, should in theory be preserved. There is conflicting data as to whether pylorus-preserving pancreaticoduodenectomy is associated with increased likelihood of gastric emptying. In practice, it shows similar long-term survival as a Whipple's (pancreaticoduodenectomy + hemigastrectomy), but patients benefit from improved recovery of weight after a PPPD, so this should be performed when the tumour does not involve the stomach and the lymph nodes along the gastric curvatures are not enlarged.

Compared to the standard Whipple procedure, the pylorus preserving pancreaticoduodenectomy technique is associated with shorter operation time and less intraoperative blood loss, requiring less blood transfusion. Post-operative complications, hospital mortality and survival do not differ between the two methods.

=== Morbidity and mortality ===
Pancreaticoduodenectomy is considered, by any standard, to be a major surgical procedure.

Many studies have shown that hospitals where a given operation is performed more frequently have better overall results (especially in the case of more complex procedures, such as pancreaticoduodenectomy). A frequently cited study published in The New England Journal of Medicine found operative mortality rates to be four times higher (16.3 v. 3.8%) at low-volume (averaging less than one pancreaticoduodenectomy per year) hospitals than at high-volume (16 or more per year) hospitals. Even at high-volume hospitals, morbidity has been found to vary by a factor of almost four depending on the number of times the surgeon has previously performed the procedure. de Wilde et al. have reported statistically significant mortality reductions concurrent with centralization of the procedure in the Netherlands.

One study reported actual risk to be 2.4 times greater than the risk reported in the medical literature, with additional variation by type of institution.

=== Postoperative complications ===
Three of the most common post-operative complications are delayed gastric emptying, bile leak, and pancreatic leak. Delayed gastric emptying, normally defined as an inability to tolerate a regular diet by the end of the first post-op week and the requirement for nasogastric tube placement, occurs in approximately 17% of operations. During the surgery, a new biliary connection (normally a choledochal-jejunal anastomosis connecting the common bile duct and jejunum) is made. This new connection may leak in 1–2% of operations. As this complication is fairly common, it is normal in this procedure for the surgeon to leave a drain in place at the end. This allows for detection of a bile leak via elevated bilirubin in the fluid drained. Pancreatic leak or pancreatic fistula, defined as fluid drained after postoperative day 3 that has an amylase content greater than or equal to 3 times the upper limit of normal, occurs in 5–10% of operations, although changes in the definition of fistula may now include a much larger proportion of patients (upwards of 40%). The benefit of using postoperative drains after general pancreatic surgery is uncertain, as there is not sufficient evidence to support that routine use of drains reduce the risk of mortality or complications.

== Recovery after surgery ==
Immediately after surgery, patients are monitored for return of bowel function and appropriate closed-suction drainage of the abdomen.

=== Return of bowel function ===
Ileus, which refers to functional obstruction or aperistalsis of the intestine, is a physiologic response to abdominal surgery, including the Whipple procedure. While post-operative ileus is typically self-limited, prolonged post-operative ileus occurs when patients develop nausea, abdominal distention, pain or intolerance of food by mouth. Various measures are taken in the immediate post-operative period to minimize prolonged post-operative ileus. A nasogastric tube is typically maintained to suction, to drain gastric and intestinal contents. Ambulation is encouraged to stimulate return of bowel function. Use of opioid medications, which interfere with intestinal motility, is limited.

== History ==
The first attempted pancreaticoduodenectomy was performed in 1898 by Alessandro Codivilla, though it was unsuccessful. The first successful operation was performed by Walther Kausch in 1909. Kausch described the first periampullary cancer resection in 1912.

Pancreaticoduodenectomy is often called Whipple's procedure or the Whipple procedure after the American surgeon Allen Whipple, who devised an improved version of the surgery in 1935 while at Columbia-Presbyterian Medical Center in New York. The operation as performed initially by Whipple was in two stages. Of the first three patients Whipple operated on, one died during the operation, and none survived beyond 28 months. Though its therapeutic effects were discovered in 1929, vitamin K was not commercially available until 1940. With its introduction, a one-stage pancreaticoduodenectomy was now a viable and more appealing option. With this pharmacologic breakthrough, Whipple was able to attempt and successfully perform a one-stage pancreaticoduodenectomy in 1940. He outlined the new procedure in his seminal paper "Observations on Radical Surgery for Lesions of the Pancreas" in June 1946.

Though initially attempted as early as 1937 by Alexander Brunschwig, the first successful pylorus-sparing pancreaticoduodenectomy was performed in 1976 by William Traverso and Longmire.

== Nomenclature ==
Fingerhut et al. argue that while the terms pancreatoduodenectomy and pancreaticoduodenectomy are often used interchangeably in the medical literature, scrutinizing their etymology yields different definitions for the two terms. As a result, the authors prefer pancreatoduodenectomy over pancreaticoduodenectomy for the name of this procedure, as strictly speaking pancreaticoduodenectomy should refer to the resection of the duodenum and pancreatic duct rather than the pancreas itself.

== See also ==
- List of surgeries by type
