= Acinar cell carcinoma of the pancreas =

- Other names: Acinar cell carcinoma
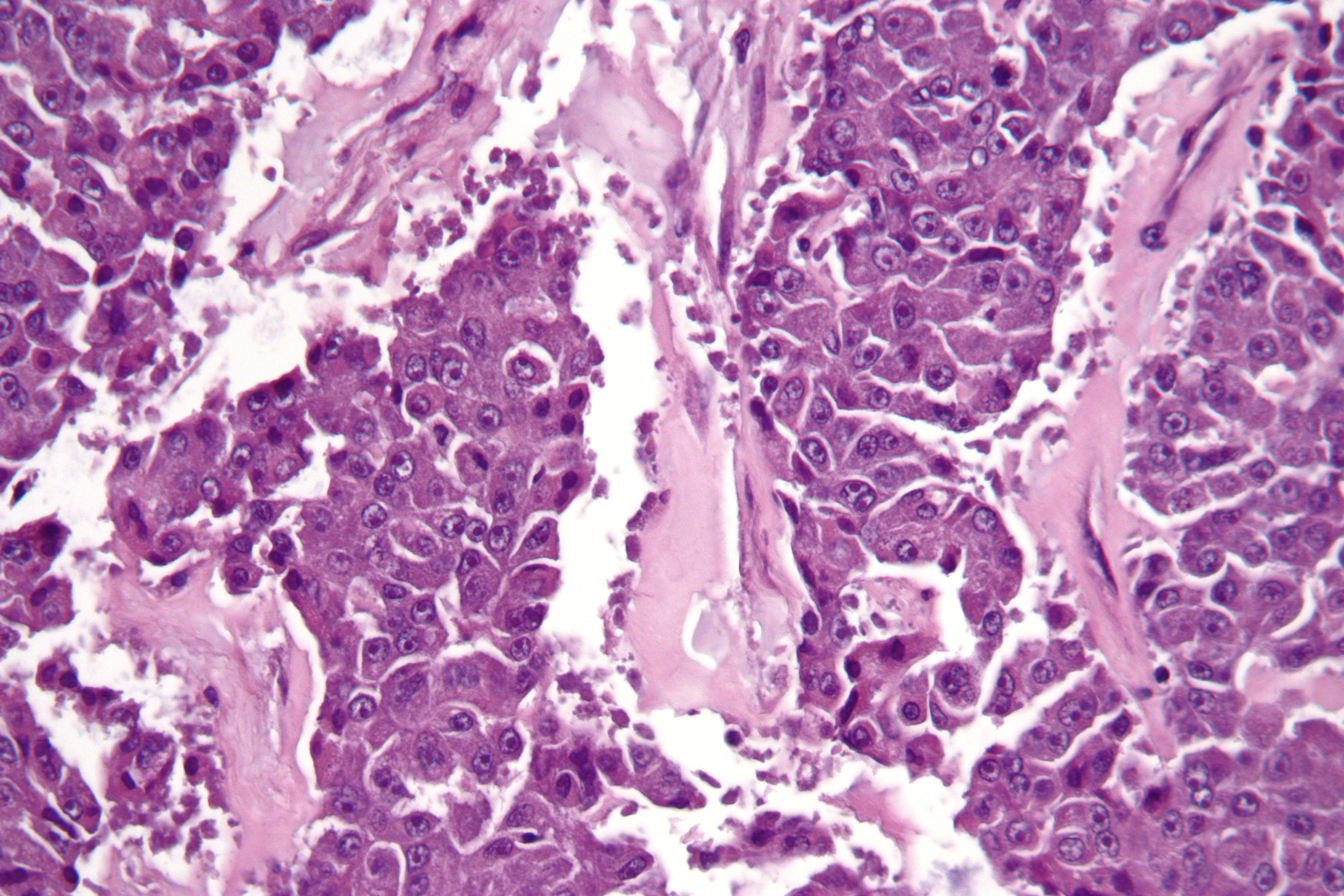
- Micrograph of an acinar cell carcinoma of the pancreas. H&E stain.
- Specialty: Oncology

Acinar cell carcinoma of the pancreas, also acinar cell carcinoma, is a rare malignant exocrine tumour of the pancreas. It represents 5% of all exocrine tumours of the pancreas, making it the second most common type of pancreatic cancer. It is abbreviated ACC. It typically has a guarded prognosis.

== Signs and symptoms ==
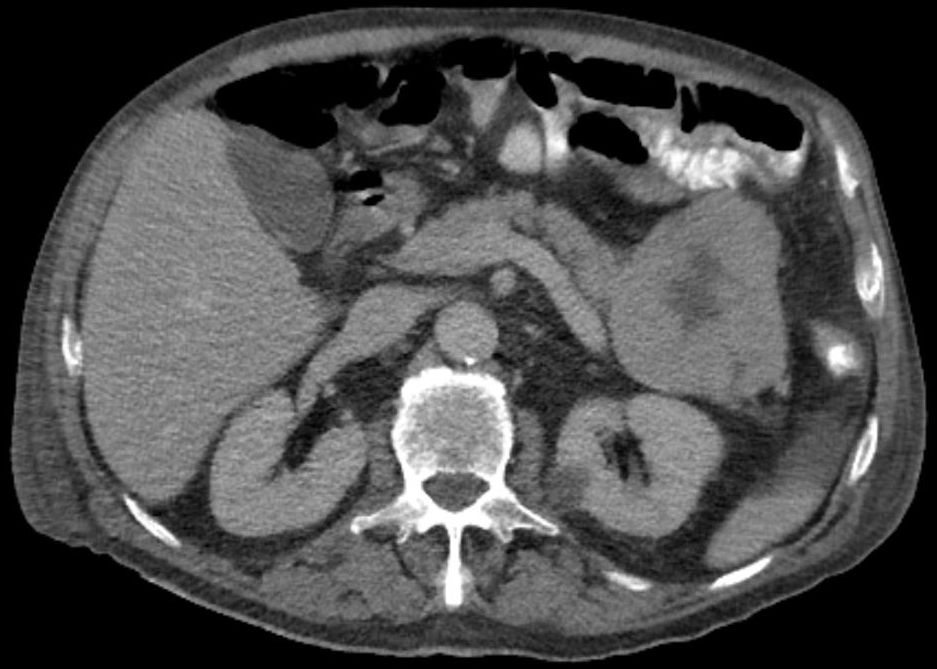
CT scan in a patient with acinar cell carcinoma

The disease is more common in men than women and the average age at diagnosis is about 60. Symptoms are often non-specific and include weight loss. A classic presentation, found in around 15% of cases includes subcutaneous nodules (due to fat necrosis) and arthralgias, caused by a release of lipase.

== Pathology ==
ACC is associated with increased serum lipase and manifests in the classic presentation known as the Schmid triad (subcutaneous fat necrosis, polyarthritis, eosinophilia).

ACC are typically large, up to 10 cm, and soft compared to pancreatic adenocarcinoma, lacking its dense stroma. They can arise in any part of the pancreas.

Histomorphologically, the tumour resembles the acinar cells of the pancreatic acini and, typically, have moderate granular cytoplasm that stain with both PAS and PASD.

== Diagnosis ==
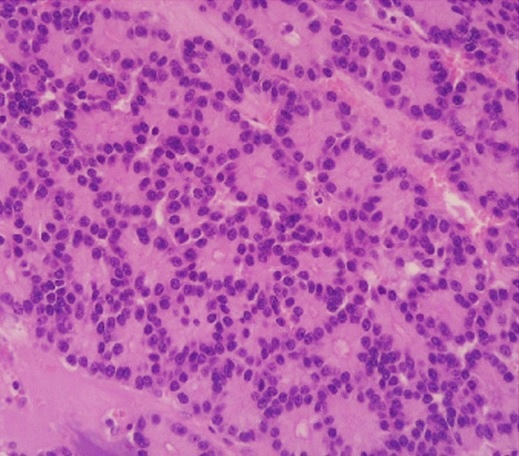
Light microscopy of acinar cell carcinoma.

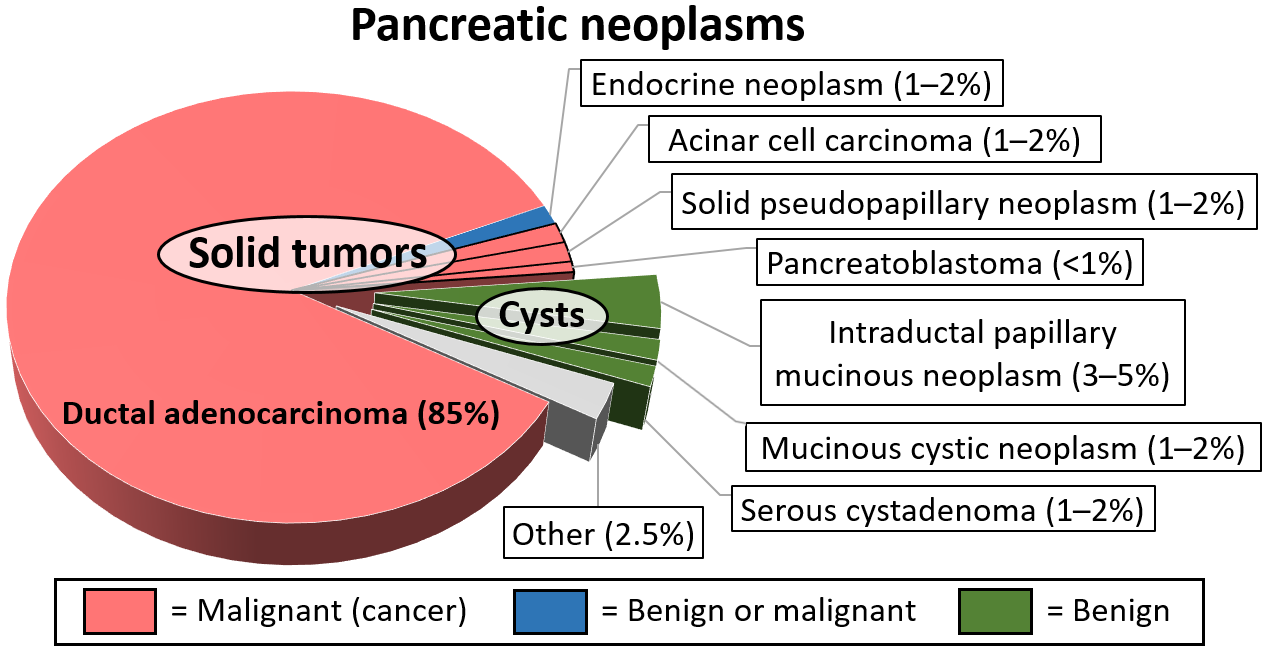
Relative incidences of various pancreatic neoplasms, with acinar cell carcinoma annotated near top right.

Light microscopy of an acinar cell carcinoma biopsy typically shows granular appearance. Immunohistochemistry is usually positive for trypsin, chymotrypsin and lipase. On genetic testing, altered genes/proteins are typically found for p53, SMAD4, APC, ARID1A and GNAS.

== Treatment ==
Surgery is recognized as the best therapeutic option for ACCs that are locally limited and resectable. In cases when surgery is not an option, more aggressive treatment plans for metastatic and locally advanced diseases must be looked for. The effectiveness of adjuvant therapy is still up for debate because of the rarity of ACC and the lack of adequate randomized trials comparing various treatment modalities.

== See also ==
- Pancreatic cancer
