= Alessandro Codivilla =

Italian surgeon

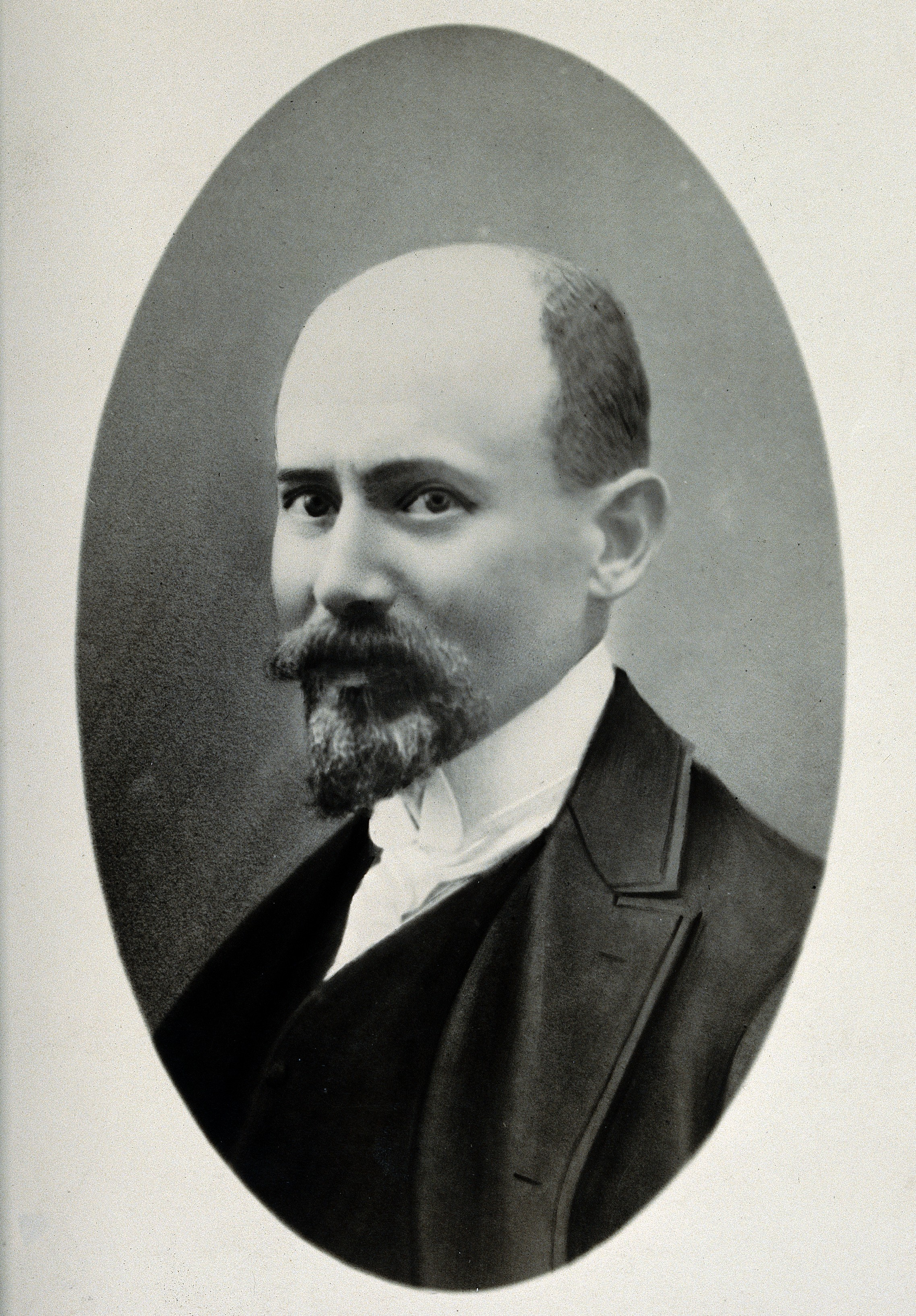
Alessandro Codivilla (21 March 1861 – 28 February 1912)

Alessandro Codivilla (21 March 1861 – 28 February 1912) was an Italian surgeon from Bologna and head of the surgical department of the hospital of Castiglion Fiorentino, known for his work in orthopaedics and first describing the pancreaticoduodenectomy.

== Life ==
=== Early years and degree ===
He was born in Bologna, Italy, on 21 March 1861 and belonged to a humble family. His father was a pawnbroker at the financial institution of Monte di Pietà. He was a very bright student, first of his class in high school, and had a particular attitude towards scientific subjects. Codivilla obtained a degree in medicine and surgery in 1886, and, right after that, became assistant to professor Pietro Loreta, the man whose death shot down Codivilla's possibilities for a career in teaching. Despite this, he did not let himself get discouraged and started to work at various hospitals. As noted by physician and writer Corrado Tumiati, Codivilla had a tough apprenticeship in the hospitals of Castiglione Fiorentino, Città di Castello and Macerata.

"Immature of studies and experience, all alone, without the guidance of a teacher or the advice of a friend, begins the hospital career, but adversely from most he is not overwhelmed by the fatal neglect of small professional centers".

Although the partial removal of the pancreas in cases of pancreatic cancer is usually associated with Allen Oldfather Whipple or the German Walther Kausch, the first documented operation of this kind was performed by Codivilla.

Codivilla was also involved in the early development of skeletal traction. Subsequently, in the competition as chief surgeon of the hospital of Bergamo, his abilities allowed him to be among the first three chosen by the technical commission, even if at the end one of the other two was elected. However, he was hired at Imola, where he entered not by competition, but by being directly called by administrators who had noticed that the surgical center of Castiglione Fiorentino, where he had worked before, had become a point of reference even for patients from provinces further away, such as Florence and Rome. He took up the job of chief surgeon in Imola on 1 January 1895 and stayed there until 1898. It was during his time there that his fame reached its peak. In August 1895 he married Emilia Ferretti, of La Spezia: from the marriage were born three children, Alessandro and Ernesto in Imola, and Mario in Bologna.

=== Life in Bologna ===
After spending eight years in provincial hospitals, during which he devoted himself to brain surgery and to bowel surgery (a discipline that greatly fascinated him), in 1899 he was invited by the lawyer Giuseppe Bacchelli, at the time president of the Provincial Administration, to abandon general surgery to devote himself to orthopaedics and become the new director of the Rizzoli Orthopaedic Institute.

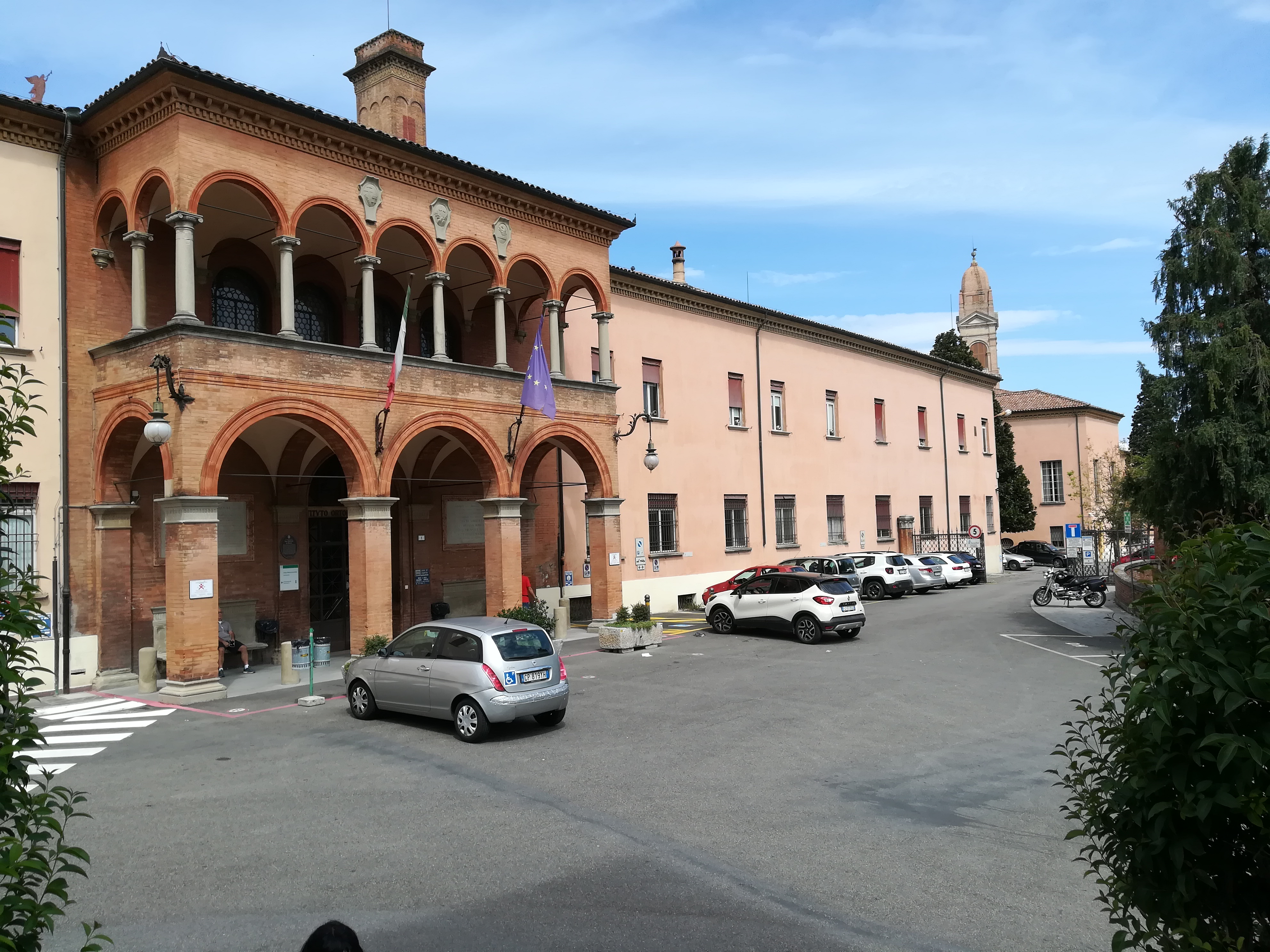
Rizzoli Orthopaedic Institute (Bologna, 2018)

"To be true, this is the most dynamic period of his scientific life, during which he, who benefited from the advantages of a pedagogical orientation only for a short time, was forced to create by himself a method of clinical analysis and a surgical experience".

For Codivilla, leaving visceral surgery to devote himself to a discipline he knew so little about as orthopaedics, was not easy. However, there were multiple reasons that led him to accept the post at Rizzoli: not only was Bologna his hometown, but there he had given some appreciated lessons in uro-genital surgery that made him more famous. Another reason, however, was the illness contracted at Imola by his firstborn, since Codivilla believed that the climate of San Michele in Bosco could somehow lead to the child's recovery. This did not happen, and Codivilla therefore found himself facing not only the untimely death of his son, but also many contrasts in the field of work because there were those who could state publicly that "the post of Director of the Institute had been entrusted to a person not suitable to support the fate of the establishment". Physician Cesare Ghillini and his followers accused him of poor training in the field of orthopaedics. The reception given to him in Bologna, would have discouraged anyone who had not been endowed with a strong and decisive character. On the other hand, the criticisms against him were not entirely unfounded: despite his excellent training in general medicine, Codivilla lacked some important knowledge for someone who wanted to take the path of orthopaedics. But, as his teacher Alfonso Poggi wrote:

"There was nothing lacking in him: of superior intelligence, keen and analytical mind and careful judgment, he had an excellent critical sense. He was ingenious in modifying and planning surgery and instruments and possessed a truly exceptional manual dexterity of execution. He had an iron will and enviable energy in proposing as well as acting. He was an honest man in the way he lived and worked".

He took an interest in and dealt with issues in the specialty (tendon transplants, hip dysplasia, osteoarticular tuberculosis), expanding the known concepts of the time and innovating therapeutic measures:

"He gladly faced tough problems, since they gave him a chance to perfect his surgical technique, of which he soon became a master and was able to bring to it an original contribution, as far as objectives and methods brought".

=== Travel in Europe and international fame ===
To add to his background the orthopaedic concepts that he lacked, he made many friendships especially with foreign orthopaedists; as his pupil said:

"From Pietro Panzeri, from Agostino Paci he learns the theoretical and practical elements of the radical care of the congenital dislocation of the hip. In a fleeting experience abroad he learns from Giulio Wolff the fundamental principles of functional orthopaedics and from Adolf Lorenz his ingenious methods of therapy".

Codivilla then went to Germany and France, where medicine had made numerous advances in the field of orthopaedics and there he befriended doctors and orthopaedic experts such as Volkmann, König, Bardenheuer, Albert, Mikulicz, Nicoladoni and Wolff. In 1901 he became a member of the D.O.G. (Deutsche Orthopädische Gesellschaft), or the German Orthopaedic Society, which was founded that year and only allowed two foreigners to join; Codivilla was one of those two. In 1902 the first meeting was held, and Codivilla praised Pietro Panzeri, the former director of the Rizzoli Institute, who had recently passed away. In fact, shortly afterwards, the Institute and Codivilla were mentioned in what is considered the first treatise on orthopaedic surgery by the German Albert Hoffa. In that same period, he organized a competition in Bologna, for the best work of innovation in the field of orthopaedics, also open to foreigners, with the intent of:

"Making Rizzoli a training ground for international competitions meant refreshing its name with those who had forgotten it and making its existence known to those who still ignored it".

Many participated in the competition. There were 14 participants, of which five were Italian, English, French and American authors and nine German authors, demonstrating how well-known the names of Codivilla and Rizzoli were to experts in the medical and orthopaedic fields.

The winner of the competition was the German Oscar Vulpius, awarded on 3 December 1905.

And as writer Vittorio Putti himself put it, that period was very important for Codivilla to establish himself both in the personal sphere and as the director of Rizzoli:

"Who can fail to remember him [Codivilla] at the Presidency of that memorable Congress in Bologna, which he so expertly organized and which gave distinguished foreign guests the measure of the great development achieved in Italy by our specialty?".

In the meantime he was also appointed as a qualified university teacher in surgical clinic in 1899 at the University of Turin, later obtaining the post as teacher of orthopaedic clinic at the University of Bologna for the academic year 1900–1901. The following year, 1902, he also obtained the chair of orthopaedics. He was confirmed the teaching assignment until 1903–1904, when he was appointed extraordinary professor in orthopaedics. In 1907 the chair was opened for competitive hiring, and since Codivilla came in first place, he was hired. Overwhelmed by his many study and teaching commitments, in 1908 he resigned from the post of director of the Rizzoli Institute, maintaining, however, the title of clinical consultant.

He participated actively in congresses and meetings during this period, and as a founding member of the Italian Orthopaedic Society he convened in 1906 the III Congress in Milan and in 1907 the IV Congress in Bologna.

He was president of the Medico-surgical Society of Bologna between 1903 and 1904 and president of the Italian Physical Therapy Society in 1906. From 1902 he became director of the Orthopaedic Archive, the oldest Italian journal of the specialty. He was an official speaker at numerous national and international congresses: the 1st Congress of the International Society of Surgery in Brussels in 1905, at the 6th Italian Paediatric Congress in 1907, at the 16th International Congress of Medicine in Budapest in 1909, and at the 22nd meeting of the Italian Society of Surgery in Rome in 1910. In May 1910 he attended the International Congress of Medicine in Buenos Aires and took an active part in meetings and scientific discussions and worked in several clinics in the city.

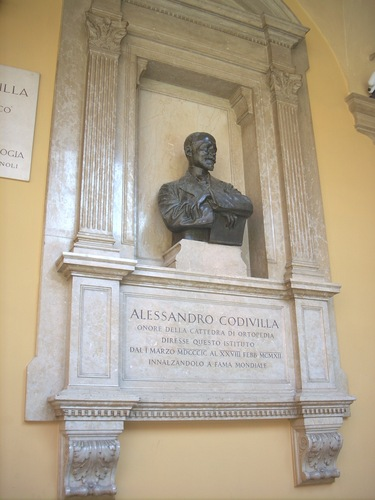
Alessandro Codivilla's monument. The monument was inaugurated 8 September 1917 and Vittorio Putti made the main address.

=== Later years and death ===
He continued his activity intensely until the autumn of 1911, when his physical condition rapidly began to decline, due to an illness that had begun to manifest itself clearly since 1907. Codivilla, who had always had at heart the fate of Rizzoli rather than his own health, was tormented by the fear that the Rizzoli Institute could regress and that orthopaedics, cultivated with such dedication, could be changed in the future and take a different course from that which he himself advocated, and that is why he took his pupil Vittorio Putti under his wing. Codivilla died in Bologna on 28 February 1912 at the age of 51, and after his death, Putti was elected president of the Rizzoli Institute and continued the work begun by his teacher. If Codivilla is to be considered the creator of Italian orthopaedics and as the one who brought orthopaedics to the operating room for the first time, Putti is to be considered the renewer of orthopaedics and as the one who has given life to new anatomical tools and techniques.

"Sustained by an unshakable faith and an iron will, his soul turned right to the purest aims and the most sacred goals of existence, as his mind as a scientist and benefactor was aimed in search of the truth and the benefit of those who suffer".

== Main publications ==
Codivilla's scientific production is composed of 124 publications, collected in two volumes by Vittorio Putti and subsequently by Bartolo Nigrisoli and printed in 1944. Of these, 25 were in foreign languages and published in the periodicals of their respective countries.

It must be said, however, that his vast scientific output is devoted entirely to the progress of surgery and until 1899 it dealt with fundamental aspects of visceral surgery. Since 1900 it was limited exclusively to the problems of orthopaedics and traumatology.

Among the most significant are:

- His thesis in medicine: Sopra un caso di empyema necessitatis pulsans (1886)
- Sulla gastroenterostomia (1894)
- Sei casi di gastroenterostomia (1894)
- Contributo alla chirurgia gastrica (1895)
- Trentuno casi di chirurgia cranica e cerebrale (1897)
- Contributo alla chirurgia gastrica (1898)
- Sulla terapia dell'accorciamento nelle deformità dell'arto inferiore (1904)
- La mia esperienza nei trapianti tendinei (1904)
- On the means of lengthening in the lower limbs, the muscles, and tissues which are shortened through deformity (1905)
- Sulle indicazioni e sulla tecnica della estensione col chiodo (1910)

== See also ==
- Pancreaticoduodenectomy
- Distraction osteogenesis

== Bibliography ==
- Anzoletti, Augusto (1954). Alessandro Codivilla e Vittorio Putti nel ricordo di un loro contemporaneo. Rocca San Casciano: Cappelli editore. p. 133.
- Cioni, Alfredo; Bertoli Barsotti, Anna Maria (1996). The Rizzoli Orthopaedic Institute in San Michele in Bosco. Bologna: Amilcare Pizzi and Instituti Ortopedici Rizzoli. p. 287.
- Codivilla, Alessandro (1905). "On the means of lengthening in the lower limbs, the muscles, and tissues which are shortened through deformity". American Journal of Orthopedic Surgery. 2: 353.
- Nigrisoli, Bartolo (1944). Scritti medici di Alessandro Codivilla con notizie su la vita e l'opera sua. Bologna: Cappelli editore. p. 1194.
- Peltier LF (1969). "The role of Alessandro Codivilla in the development of skeletal traction". The Journal of Bone and Joint Surgery. American Volume. 51 (7): 1433. doi:10.2106/00004623-196951070-00026. PMID 4898579.
- Putti, Vittorio (1917). Scritti medici di Alessandro Codivilla. Bologna: Istituto Ortopedico Rizzoli. p. 8.
- Putti, Vittorio (1917). In memoria di Alessandro Codivilla. Discorso letto li 8 settembre 1917 inaugurandosi il monumento ad Alessandro Codivilla nell'Istituto Rizzoli. Bologna: Tip. M.Zamboni. p. 34.
- Randelli, Mario (1982). "Codivilla, Alessandro". Dizionario Biografico degli Italiani. Vol. 26. Treccani. ISBN 0-684-10114-9.
