= Walther Kausch =

German surgeon (1867–1928)

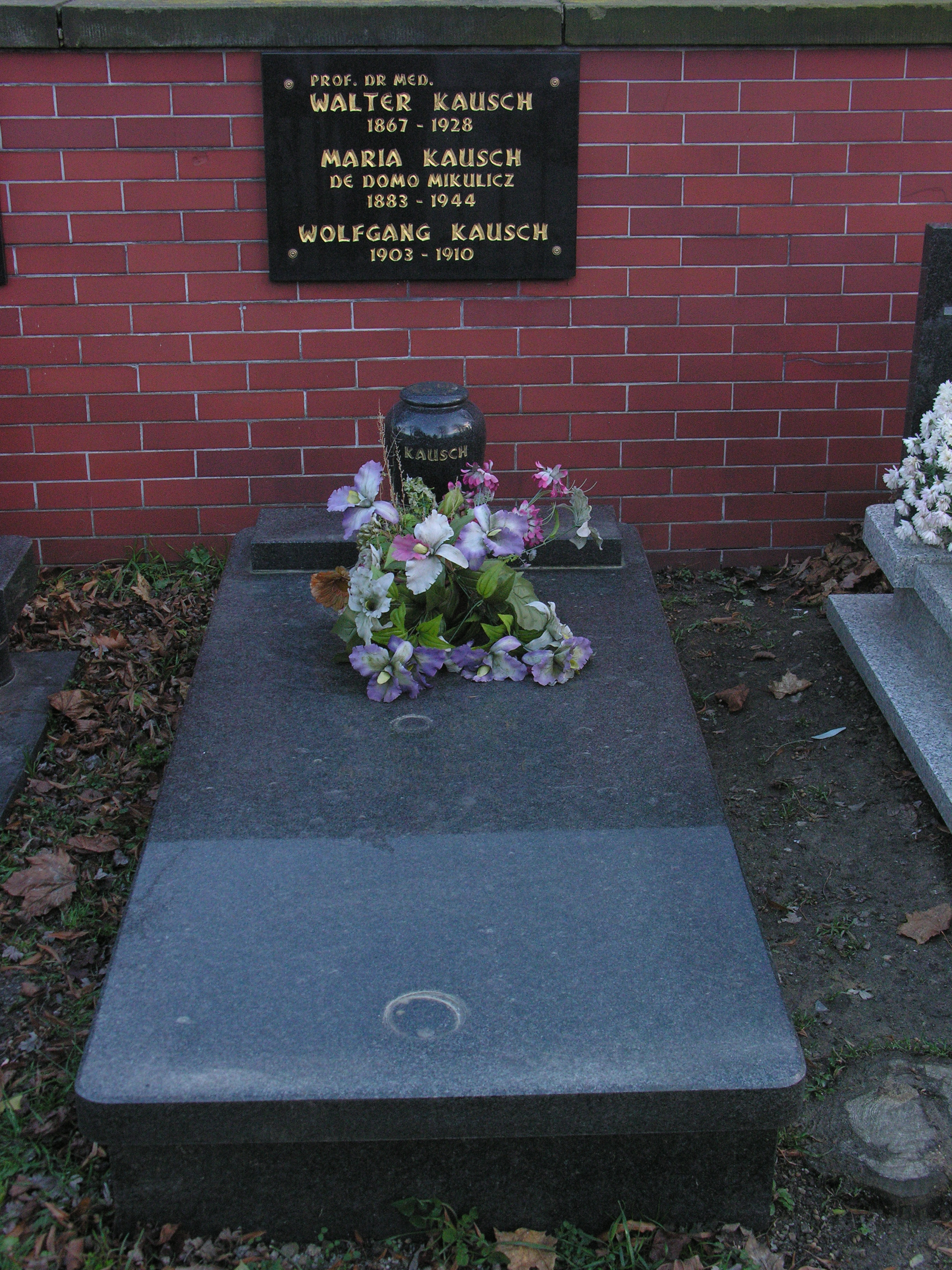
Grave of Walther Kausch in Świebodzice

Walther Kausch (17 July 1867, Königsberg – 24 March 1928, Berlin) was a German surgeon. He was involved in improvements made to the pancreaticoduodenectomy process.

Walther Carl Eduard Kausch was the second of four children. He studied medicine at the Friedrich-Wilhelm-Universität in Strassburg from 1885 to 1890. He received his doctor's license on 8 July 1890 and obtained his doctorate in 1891. From 1890 to 1892 he worked in the psychiatric-neurologic clinic under Friedrich Jolly (1844-1904) and Karl Fürstner (1848-1906), then from 1892 to 1896 at the medical clinic under Bernhard Naunyn (1839-1935). After being habilitated for internal medicine in 1896, he changed to surgery. From 1896 to 1906 he worked at the university surgical clinic in Breslau, training under professor Jan Mikulicz-Radecki (1850-1905). The surgical clinic in Breslau was one of the largest in its time.

Kausch was habilitated for surgery in 1899, becoming titular professor in 1902. In 1903, Kausch married Mikulicz' daughter. After the death of his father-in-law in 1905, Kausch became head of the clinic in an acting capacity. In 1905, he was elected medical director and head of the I. surgical department at the Städtisches Augusta-Viktoria-Krankenhaus in Berlin-Schöneberg, then still under construction. He headed the Augusta-Viktoria-Krankenhaus and its surgical department until his death from fulminant pulmonary emboli following perforating appendicitis on 24 March 1928.
