= 1-Lysophosphatidylcholine =

Class of phospholipids

General chemical structure of 1-lyso-phosphatidylcholines, where R is a variable fatty acyl group

1-Lysophosphatidylcholines (or 1-lysoPC) are a class of phospholipids that are intermediates in the metabolism of lipids. They result from the hydrolysis of an acyl group from the sn-1 position of phosphatidylcholine. They are also called 2-acyl-sn-glycero-3-phosphocholines. The synthesis of phosphatidylcholines with specific fatty acids occurs through the synthesis of 1-lysoPC. The formation of various other lipids generates 1-lysoPC as a by-product.

Other synonyms for this class of compounds are 2-acylglycero-3-phosphocholine, 1-lyso-2-acyl-sn-glycero-3-phosphocholine, β-lysophosphatidylcholine, 2-acylglycerophosphocholine, L-1-lysolecithin and 1-lecithin.

== Chemical properties ==
1-LysoPC can convert to the structurally similar 2-lysoPC. This happens by the migration of the acyl group from the sn-1 position of the glycerol backbone to the sn-2 position.

1-lysoPC	2-lysoPC

The lowest rate of isomerization is at pH 4–5. Starting from either 1-lysoPC or 2-lysoPC, an equilibrium mixture of 90% 2-lysoPC and 10% 1-lysoPC is obtained with a half-time of about 10 minutes under physiological conditions and about 1 hour under typical laboratory conditions. Thus, unless special care is taken to slow this isomerization reaction, characterization of either of these lipids using laboratory assays that take a significant amount of time is likely to produce results on a mixture of the two lipids.

In the fungus 'Penicillium notatum, an enzyme called lysolecithin acylmutase has been reported that can catalyze this isomerization reaction at low pHs at which the uncatalyzed reaction occurs very slowly.

== Metabolic reactions ==
Because 1-lysoPC has a relatively short half-life (see above), it is primarily a metabolic intermediate or side-product in the formation or breakdown of other lipids.

=== As product of reactions ===
1-LysoPC can be produced from phosphatidylcholine by enzymes having phospholipase A1 activity, that is, enzymes hydrolyzing specifically at the sn-1 position of a phospholipid and releasing a fatty acid. Enzymes having phospholipase B activity hydrolyze both the sn-1 and sn-2 positions, so they produce both 1-lysoPC and 2-lysoPC. In humans, a number of enzymes with phospholipase A1 exist: they include two from the brain (with different optimal pHs), two from the liver (one cytosomal and one membrane-bound) and one from the mitochondrion.

phosphatidylcholine (PC)	phospholipase A1	1-lysoPC		fatty acid
			+

1-LysoPC can be produced as a by-product of the reaction transferring an acyl group from a phosphatidylcholine to an acceptor molecule, resulting in the formation of an esterified acceptor molecule. In the human, an example of such a transacylation reaction is that catalyzed by the enzyme LRAT that converts an all-trans retinol to an all-trans-retinyl ester. The latter is a storage form of Vitamin A in various tissues, as well as a retinal precursor in the retina (see visual cycle).

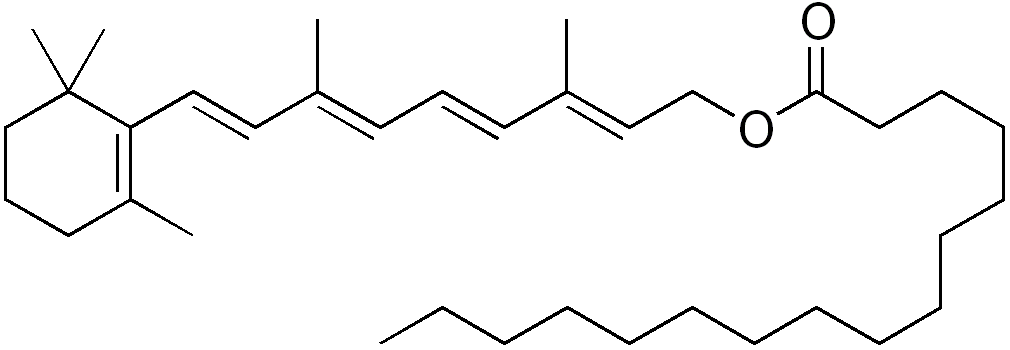
all-trans-retinol		dipalmitoyl-PC	lecithin retinol acyltransferase	all-trans-retinyl ester		2-palmitoyl-PC (a 1-lysoPC)
	+				+

1-LysoPC is also a by-product of the reaction in which N-arachidonoyl-1,2-diacyl-glycerol 3-phosphoethanolamine (NAPE) is produced. This is a rate-limiting step for the synthesis of anandamide and related signaling lipids. Two enzymes are known to catalyze this reaction. LRAT-like protein (RLP-1; a product of the gene HRASLS5), catalyzes transfer of an acyl group from phosphatidylcholine (PC) to phosphatidylethanol (PE), resulting in the formation of radioactive NAPE. RLP-1 does not show selectivity with respect to the sn-1 and sn-2 positions of PC as an acyl donor and therefore can generate N-arachidonoyl-PE (an anandamide precursor) from 2-arachidonoyl-PC and PE. There is also a Ca^{2+}-dependent, membrane-associated enzyme (whose gene is currently not known) that is specific for the sn-1-acyl group of PC.

phosphatidylethanol (PE)		PC	LRAT-like protein	NAPE		1-lysoPC
	+				+

=== As substrate of reactions ===
1-lysoPC can be hydrolyzed further by lysophospholipases to lose the remaining fatty acid and yield L-1-glycero-3-phosphocholine. In humans, 1-lysoPC can be hydrolyzed by ten different enzymes: calcium-independent phospholipase A2-gamma (coded by the gene PNPLA8), neuropathy target esterase (PNPLA6), lysophospholipase (PLB1), eosinophil lysophospholipase (CLC), galactoside-binding soluble lectin 13 (LGALS13), Group XV phospholipase A2 (PLA2G15), acyl-protein thioesterase 1 (LYPLA1), lysophospholipase (PLA2G4A), acyl-protein thioesterase 2 (LYPLA2) and PNPLA7 (Some of these enzymes also have phospholipase A2 activity). Other organisms have different numbers of enzymes that catalyze the same chemical reaction. For example the bacterium E. coli has only the gene products of tesA and pldB, while the yeast S. cerevisiae has the gene products of NTE1, PLB2, PLB1 and PLB3.

1-lysoPC	lysophospholipase	Glycerol-3-phosphocholine		Fatty acid
			+

There appear to be at least two enzymes that can produce a phosphatidylcholine molecule from 1-lysoPC. 2-acylglycerophosphocholine O-acyltransferase, an enzyme purified in liver microsomes, catalyzes specifically the acylation of 1-lysoPC with acyl-CoA to create a phosphatidylcholine molecule. This reaction is important for the synthesis of phosphatidylcholine containing specific fatty acids, but are not used for the de-novo synthesis of phosphatidylcholine. In contrast to these finding from rat liver microsomes, mammalian acyl transferase from dog lungs was found to exhibit no preference between 1-lyso-2-acyl-phosphatidylcholine and 1-acyl-2-lyso-phosphatidylcholine. These differences have been attributed to the remodeling of membrane phospholipids in order to regulate membrane fluidity and the accumulation of physiologically important fatty acids such as arachidonic acid.

1-lysoPC		acyl-CoA	2-acylglycerophosphocholine O-acyltransferase	PC		Glycerol-3-phosphocholine
	+				+
	+		CoA		+

In humans, triglyceride synthesis occurs through the Kennedy pathway, in which glycerol-3-phosphate is sequentially acylated to produce triacylglycerol. In plants and fungi, however, triacylglycerol synthesis can be catalyzed by phospholipid:diacylglycerol acyltransferase (PDAT). Thus, diacylglycerol is the acceptor of a fatty acid coming from phosphatidylcholine, resulting in the release of a 1-lysoPC.

diacylglycerol		PC	Phospholipid:diacylglycerol acyltransferase	triacylglycerol		1-lysoPC
	+				+

A rat enzyme was found to transfer the acyl group from 2-lysoPC to 1-lysoPC, producing phosphatidylcholine.

2-lysoPC		1-lysoPC	lysophospholipase-transacylase	PC		glycerol-3-phosphocholine
	+				+

== Transport systems ==
In the human body, 1-lysoPC that is made in the liver is carried by albumin in the blood plasma to various tissues where it is acylated to produce PC molecules with specific acyl groups. In the liver, 1-lysoPC is released by phospholipase A1 and is also formed by hepatic lipase. Albumin-bound 1-lysoPC is an important pathway to access tissue compartments such as the brain, which take up few lipoproteins. Fatty acyl chains delivered by this route can then be acylated into tissue membrane phospholipids. Lysophosphatidylcholine processing has been discovered to be an essential component of normal human brain development: those born with genes that prevent adequate uptake suffer from lethal microcephaly. MFSD2a has been shown to transport LPC-bound polyunsaturated fatty acids, including DHA and EPA, across the blood-brain and blood-retinal barriers.

In the human body, lysoPC (1-lysoPC and 2-lysoPC together) represent 5-20% of all phospholipids in the blood plasma. Taking care to control for the chemical isomerization between 1-lysoPC and 2-lysoPC (see above), about half of the lysoPC molecules in plasma have been shown to be in the 1-lysoPC form. Most (~60%) of the lysoPC is bound to albumin, and the rest is associated with lipoproteins. Of the total (free and esterified form) fatty acids carried by albumin, about one third is in the form of lysoPC.

In addition to transport across tissues in the body, there are transport systems within cells to transport 1-lysoPC from where it is synthesized, or where it is delivered from other tissues, to where it is needed. Most organisms have transfer proteins (type IV ATPases) to transport phospholipid across their cell membranes. These proteins are likely to transport 1-lysoPC as well but their substrate specificities have not been established yet. E. coli and other bacteria have such a transporter protein that is a specialized lysophospholipid transporter (the LplT gene product). It can "flip" 1-lysoPC and the related compound 2-acylglycerophosphoethanolamine from the outer leaflet of the lipid bilayer to inner layer.

== Synthesis in the laboratory ==
In the laboratory, a method to prepare relatively pure 1-lysoPC and purify away the reaction side-products is available.
