= Curschmann =

Curschmann is a German surname. Notable people with the surname include:

- Karl Friedrich Curschmann (1804–1841), German song composer.
- Heinrich Curschmann (1846–1910), German internist who was a native of Giessen.
- Hans Curschmann (1875–1950), German physician and neurologist remembered for Curschmann-Batten-Steinert syndrome.

== See also ==
- Curschmann's spirals, a finding in the sputum of several different lung diseases
