= Sten Stymne =

Swedish biochemist and professor

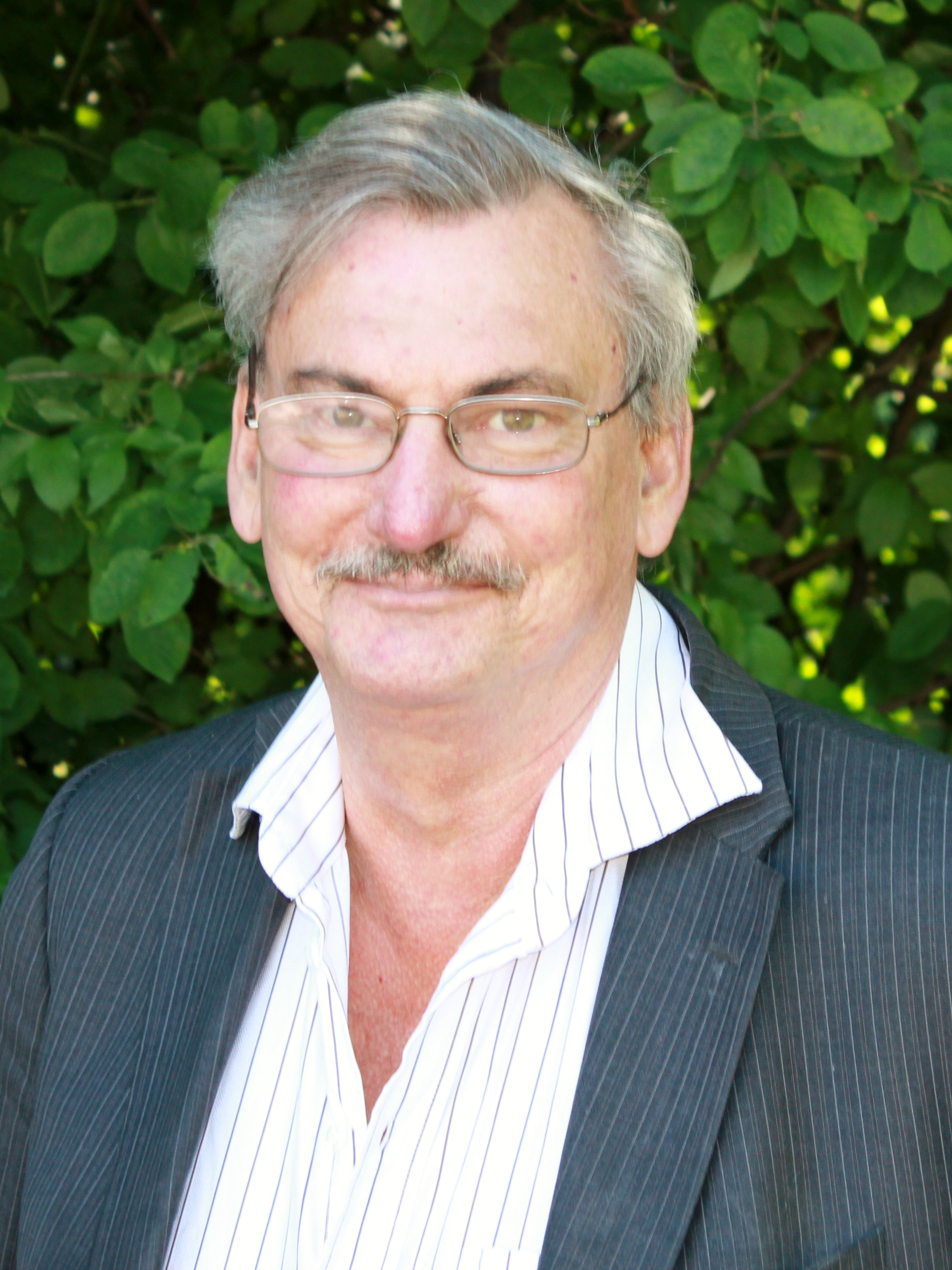
- Stymne in 2013
- Born: 28 November 1949 (age 76); Gävle, Sweden
- Education: Swedish university of Agricultural Sciences (PhD)
- Known for: Characterization of important steps in plant lipid biosynthesis.
- Awards: Terry Galliard Award (2008)
- Scientific career
- Fields: Biochemistry and Molecular Biology
- Thesis: The biosynthesis of linoleic and linolenic acids in plants (1980)

Sten Gustaf Stymne (born 28 November 1949) is a Swedish biochemist and professor emeritus in plant breeding at the Swedish University of Agricultural Sciences. During the years, Stymne has been one of the leaders in plant lipid biochemistry and was awarded the 2008 Terry Galliard Award as a recognition for his contributions to the field. Stymne has for many years been a frequent debater in various news media, criticizing Sweden and the European Union for its negative attitude towards plant biotechnology.

== Academic career ==
Stymne was born in Gävle. He received his Bachelor of Science from the Stockholm University (1976) and soon after enrolled as a PhD-student at the Swedish University of Agricultural science from where he received his doctorate degree in 1981 with the dissertation "The biosynthesis of linoleic and linolenic acids in plants". The following year, Stymne was appointed associate Professor of Food Biology at the Swedish University of Agricultural Sciences.

Stymne's research has throughout his career been focused towards how plants produce oil and the model he and Allan Stobart presented in 1987 are still featured in textbooks on plant biology and physiology. Stymne realized early that the forthcoming biotechnology development would revolutionize our way of looking at plants and biochemical processes and that these processes would be possible to manipulate to improve or add new properties. Through systematic and careful labeling- and enzyme activity studies in the 1980s and 90s, he was able to demonstrate several previously unknown biochemical pathways for oil production in seeds and which later proved to be true for plant cells in general.

Later in his career, Stymne focused on studying the biochemical processes involved in the biosynthesis of exotic fatty acids, an area where Sten have had great impact by increasing the knowledge of how specialized acyltransferases and phospholipases are essential for the enrichment of exotic fatty acids in the oil. Furthermore, Stymne's group could identify and describe a whole new plant family of enzymes (PDATs) previously identified only in animals and responsible for transferring fatty acids between phospholipids and diacylglycerol molecules which play an important role in oil synthesis not only in plants but at all higher organisms. Stymne's group was also the first to clone and characterize plant genes for membrane lipid synthesis (LPCATs) and synthesis of sterol esters (PSAT). These discoveries have been indispensable to identify essential stages of plant lipid metabolism.

As an acknowledgment of his efforts in his field of research, Stymne was awarded the 2008 Terry Galliard Award which is awarded to researchers whose work has had particular influence in the field of plant lipid biochemistry. Stymne has also been awarded the honorary reward For Zealous and Devoted Service of the Realm from the Swedish government for his long and devoted service.

== Stymne as an opinion maker ==
For many years, Stymne has been one of Sweden's most successful and dedicated debaters when it comes to Sweden's and the European Union's attitude toward genetically modified crops and their role in future agriculture. As such, his position has been that genetic engineering is a natural part of the plant breeder's toolbox and that plant biotechnology represents a new green revolution and a prerequisite for adapting agriculture to future demands. Despite his positive attitude towards technology application in plant breeding, Stymne warned early of the risks of letting a few large multinational companies have too much influence over specific crop traits introduced by genetic engineering and hence the future seed market. This, he meant, is worsened by Sweden and the rest of Europe's inability to handle the issue of genetically modified crops using a scientific and non-biased approach. Although Stymne has been critical of the centralization of influence over future agriculture to a few multinational companies, he has at the same time made clear that the debate about these must be fact-based and not subjected to the spread of false information.

Furthermore, Stymne has criticized the environmental movement to demonize genetic engineering and through delusions of facts and lies attempting to sabotage the debate. At the same time, Stymne has expressed his support for the environmental movement and stressed the importance of the efforts of both environmental and individual environmentalists to stop ongoing and prevent further negative environmental impact.

== Future oil crops ==
As a natural extension of his research in plant lipid biochemistry, Stymne has engaged in the issue of agricultural products for the energy and industry sectors. He has criticized the use of agricultural products for fuel production, such as converting corn starch to bioethanol, by pointing out the inefficient energy conversion and the world's fuel requirement is too large for agriculture to be a sustainable solution. Instead, Stymne has argued that resources should instead be aimed at producing new oil qualities to replace fossil oil in the oleochemical industry, where he believes that the environmental and economic benefits of a return to a plant oil-based industry would be high.

Stymne believes that the application of genetic engineering is a prerequisite for successful completion of this transition since many plants that produce oils that are of interest to industry are not suitable for large-scale cultivation. For a long time, he has argued for the need for brand new oil crops that are not only suitable for large-scale cultivation across large parts of Europe but also a suitable candidate for gene manipulation to tailor oil quality. Stymne have suggested that Crambe abyssinica and Lepidium campestre may be suitable candidates with regard to agronomic and genetic engineering factors. He has also highlighted that Lepidium campestre can be used to develop a perennial high-yielding oil crop which can thereby reduce environmental impact due to reduced need for plowing.

=== Stymne as a science communicator ===
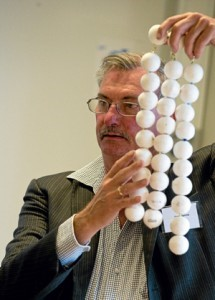
Sten Stymne has become famous for his commitment to communicating his research to the public. Here he is describing how plants synthesize oil.

Throughout his career, Stymne has been actively involved in popularization of his area of research, genetic engineering and genetically modified crops, and has become famous for the innovative way of explaining abstract research results on plant lipid biochemistry. He has also been a widely employed lecturer and writer on the Swedish University of Agricultural Sciences blog where he participated actively in the discussion about genetically modified crops with the interested public.

=== Criticism ===
As active in the GMO debate, Stymne has received a lot of criticism from predominantly opponents who, among other things, claim that he is biased in his opinion while claiming that he is receiving financial support from the plant biotechnology industry ("being bought by"). Stymne has then responded by publicly reporting hus past and current industrial connections.

Stymne has also been criticized by Greenpeace as a response to his criticism of a study sponsored by Greenpeace, conducted by Gilles-Éric Séralini at the University of Caen, where Greenpeace accuses Stymne of lacking relevant skills for his criticism of the study. [27] The same study has also received massive criticisms by, inter alia, the European Food Safety Authority whose analysis indicates that the Séralini-study suffers from serious errors and shortcomings in both methodology and data analysis.
