= Edelfosine =

Names
- Systematic IUPAC name 2-Methoxy-3-(octadecyloxy)propyl 2-(trimethylazaniumyl)ethyl phosphate
- Other names ET-18-O-CH3; 1-octadecyl-2-O-methyl-glycero-3-phosphocholine

Identifiers
CAS Number	70641-51-9
3D model (JSmol)	Interactive image
ChEBI	CHEBI:78649
ChEMBL	ChEMBL107514
ChemSpider	1350
PubChem CID	1392
UNII	1Y6SNA8L5S
CompTox Dashboard (EPA)	DTXSID20922896 DTXSID9045766, DTXSID20922896
- InChI: InChI=1S/C27H58NO6P/c1-6-7-8-9-10-11-12-13-14-15-16-17-18-19-20-21-23-32-25-27(31-5)26-34-35(29,30)33-24-22-28(2,3)4/h27H,6-26H2,1-5H3 Key: MHFRGQHAERHWKZ-UHFFFAOYSA-N; InChI=1S/C27H58NO6P/c1-6-7-8-9-10-11-12-13-14-15-16-17-18-19-20-21-23-32-25-27(31-5)26-34-35(29,30)33-24-22-28(2,3)4/h27H,6-26H2,1-5H3
- SMILES: [O-]P(=O)(OCC(OC)COCCCCCCCCCCCCCCCCCC)OCC[N+](C)(C)C

Properties
Chemical formula	C_{27}H_{58}NO_{6}P
Molar mass	523.736 g·mol^{−1}
- Except where otherwise noted, data are given for materials in their standard state (at 25 °C [77 °F], 100 kPa). verify (what is ?) Infobox references

Edelfosine (ET-18-O-CH3; 1-octadecyl-2-O-methyl-glycero-3-phosphocholine) is a synthetic alkyl-lysophospholipid (ALP). It has antineoplastic (anti-cancer) effects.

Like all ALPs, it incorporates into the cell membrane and does not target the DNA. In many tumor cells, it causes selective apoptosis, sparing healthy cells. Edelfosine can activate the Fas/CD95 cell death receptor, can inhibit the MAPK/ERK mitogenic pathway and the Akt/protein kinase B (PKB) survival pathway. Aside from these plasma-level effects, edelfosine also affects gene expression by modulating the expression and activity of transcription factors.

It has immune modulating properties. These characteristics cause edelfosine also to affect HIV, parasitic, and autoimmune diseases.
It can complement classic anti-cancer drugs such as cisplatin.

It can be administered orally, intraperitoneally (IP) and intravenously (IV).

Edelfosine and other ALPs can be used for purging residual leukemic cells from bone marrow transplants.

It is an analog of miltefosine and perifosine.

== In vitro and in vivo results ==
Edelfosine apoptosis-inducing abilities were studied with several types of cancer, among them multiple myeloma and non-small and small cell lung carcinoma cell lines. In vivo activity against human solid tumors in mice was shown against malignant gynecological tumor cells, like ovarian cancer, and against breast cancer. In vivo biodistribution studies demonstrated a "considerably higher" accumulation of Edelfosine in tumor cells than in other analyzed organs. It remained undergraded for a long time.

== Clinical trials ==
Several clinical trials were conducted. Among them a phase I trials with solid tumors or leukemias and phase II with non-small-cell lung carcinomas (NSCLC). In a Phase II clinical trial for use of Edelfosine in treating leukemia with bone marrow transplants, it was found to be safe and 'possibly effective'. A phase II trial for the treatment of brain cancers was also reported. It showed encouraging results in stopping the growth of the tumor and a considerable improvement in the "quality of life" of the patients. A phase II trial on the effect of Edelfosine on advanced non-small-cell bronchogenic carcinoma had a "remarkable" "high proportion of patients with stationary tumor status" as result, stable disease after initial progression in 50% of the patients.

== Toxicity ==
In animal tests the main toxic effect was gastrointestinal irritation. There were no significant negative systemic side effects observed. It showed that edelfosine can be given over a long period safely. Most important, in contrast to many DNA-directed anti-cancer drugs, no bone marrow toxicity was in vivo observed. Those findings in animals were confirmed in clinical trials. No mutagenic or cytogenetic effects were observed.

== History ==
In the 1960s Herbert Fischer and Paul Gerhard in Freiburg, Germany, found that lysolecithin (2-lysophosphatidylcholine, LPC) increases the phagocytotic activity of macrophages. Since LPC had a short half-life, synthetic LPC-analogues were tested by Fischer, Otto Westphal, Hans Ulrich Weltzien and Paul Gerhard Munder. Unexpectedly, some of the substances showed strong anti-tumor activity and among them Edelfosine was the most effective. It is therefore considered to be the prototype of synthetic anti-cancer lipids.
