= LRAT =

LRAT may refer to:

- Lecithin retinol acyltransferase
- Phosphatidylcholine—retinol O-acyltransferase
- Linear Resolution Asymmetric Tautology, a type of proof certificate for the Boolean satisfiability problem
