= Phospholipase A1 =

Type of enzyme

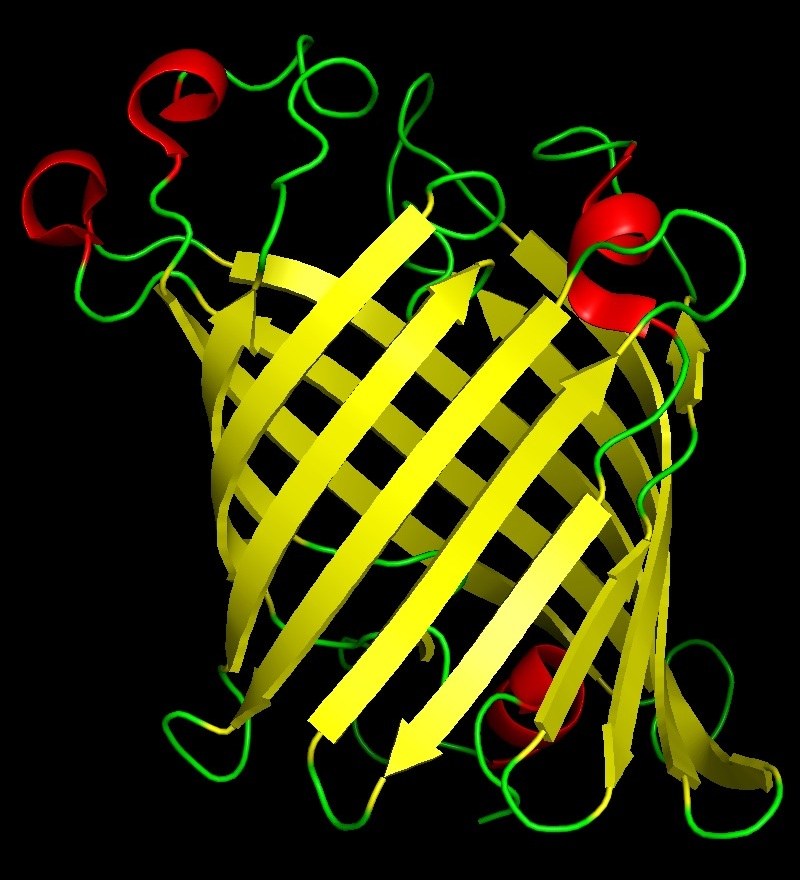
- Crystallographic structure of phospholipase A_{1}. Red region denotes α helices, Green region denotes loops, and yellow region denotes β sheets.

Identifiers
- EC no.: 3.1.1.32
- CAS no.: 9043-29-2

Databases
- BRENDA: enzyme data
- ExPASy: NiceZyme view
- KEGG: enzyme entry
- MetaCyc: metabolic pathway
- Rhea: reactions
- PDB structures: RCSB PDB PDBe PDBsum
- Gene Ontology: AmiGO / QuickGO
Search
- PMC: articles
- PubMed: articles
- NCBI: proteins

Phospholipase A_{1} (EC 3.1.1.32; systematic name: phosphatidylcholine 1-acylhydrolase) is a type of phospholipase enzyme which removes the 1-acyl group:

phosphatidylcholine + H_{2}O ⇌ 2-acylglycerophosphocholine + a carboxylate

It is an enzyme that resides in a class of enzymes called phospholipase that hydrolyze phospholipids into fatty acids.

== Function ==
PLA_{1}'s are present in numerous species including humans, and have a variety of cellular functions that include regulation and facilitation of the production of lysophospholipid mediators, and acting as digestive enzymes. These enzymes are responsible for fast turnover rates of cellular phospholipids. In addition to this, the products of the reaction catalyzed by PLA_{1} which are a fatty acid and a lysophospholipid are important in various biological functions such as platelet aggregation and smooth muscle contraction. In addition, lysophospholipids can be found as surfactants in food techniques and cosmetics, and can be used in drug delivery. Since PLA_{1} is found in many species, it has been found that there are different classes of this one specific enzyme based on the organism being studied.

== Human enzymes ==
In humans, a number of phospholipases are able to catalyze this type of reaction, with some being multi-functional enzymes that can also act as phospholipase A2 enzymes:

- Phospholipase ABHD3 (ABHD3)
- Phospholipase DDHD1 (DDHD1)
- Phospholipase A and acyltransferase 1-5 (PLAAT1-5)
- Lysosomal phospholipase A2 (PLA2G15)

Aside from traditional phospholipases, a few lipase also show this type of activity:

- Hepatic lipase (LIPG)
- Endothelial lipase (LIPC)
- Lipoprotein lipase (LPL) – shows weak (but detectable) phospholipase activity.

In addition to the type of enzyme that can act on phosphatidylcholine (EC 3.1.1.34), humans also have enzymes from a related family called "phosphatidylserine-specific phospholipase A1" (EC 3.1.1.111). This includes the following enzymes:

- Phospholipase A1 member A (PLA1A)
- Phospholipase DDHD1 (DDHD1)
- ABHD16B (ABHD16B)

== Species and tissue distribution ==
There are many variations of PLA_{1}, differing slightly between each organism it is present in. Most notably, it can be found in mammalian cells such as plasma of rat livers and bovine brains, and can also be found in metazoan parasites, protozoan parasites, and snake venom.

== Industrial use ==
Unlike other phospholipases such as PLA_{2}, there is much that is unknown about PLA_{1} due to the lack of any efficient way to purify, clone, express, and characterize this and similar enzymes. PLA_{1} is currently commercially unavailable because of this. Lysophospholipids can be found as surfactants in food techniques and cosmetics, and can be used in drug delivery. Current research is being applied to determine suitable growth environments for PLA_{1} production. In one particular study, it was found that PLA_{1} can be produced by S. cerevisiae and A. oryzae. In these PLA_{1} producing cultures, increasing the nitrogen and carbon sources can lead to increase in PLA_{1} yields.

== Discovery ==
In the early 1900s, an observation was made, showing an accumulation of free fatty acids after incubation of pancreatic juice with phosphatidylcholine. One of the first cases of observed PLA_{1} activity was on 1903 when snake venom was found to alter phosphatidylcholine into lysophosphatidylcholine, which is defined as a phosphatidylcholine without one of its fatty acids. In the 1960s, it was discovered to be that enzymes catalyze this fatty acid cleavage in multiple ways, one of which is the sn-1 position. This particular reaction is catalyzed by PLA_{1}, while the reaction at the sn-2 position is catalyzed by phospholipase A2.

== See also ==
- Outer membrane phospholipase A1
