= Alkyl-lysophospholipids =

Class of chemical compounds

Chemical structure of edelfosine, an alkyl-lysophospholipid being studied for its potential use as a pharmaceutical drug

Alky-lysophospholipids (ALPs) are synthetic analogs of lysophosphatidylcholines (LPCs), also called lysolecithins. They are synthesized by replacing the acyl-group within the LPC with an alkyl group. In contrast to LPCs, ALPs are metabolically very stable.

ALPs are being studied for their potential antineoplastic (anti-cancer) and immune-modulating effects. Their anti-tumor effects are due to modulation of intracellular signalling pathways, inducing apoptosis. It is highly selective, sparing healthy cells. Several examples including edelfosine, miltefosine, and perifosine are under development as drugs against cancer and other diseases.
