= Lophomonas blattarum =

Scientific classification
- Domain: Eukaryota
- Clade: Metamonada
- Phylum: Parabasalia
- Class: Lophomonadea
- Order: Lophomonadida
- Family: Lophomonadidae
- Genus: Lophomonas
- Species: L. blattarum

Binomial name
- Lophomonas blattarum Stein, 1860

Species of flagellate

Lophomonas blattarum is a protozoan flagellate that is found in the gut of cockroaches. It has been found to be an emerging pathogen causing bronchopulmonary infection and sinusitis in immunocompromised, and also immunocompetent, patients.

The histologic appearance of L. blattarum is of a round, ovoid or pear-shaped unicellular organism with two tufts of flagella borne on the anterior end of the cell. The cytoplasm of the cell is granulated. The cell is 20 to 60 micrometers in diameter. Suspected organisms should be distinguished from Creola bodies or ciliocytophthoria, which are autogenous. The difficulty in resolving the fine structures of L. blattarum by light microscopy, including its axial filament, calyx and radiating perinuclear tubules, led Li and Gao (2016) to question the ability of L. blattarum to be an infectious agent in the lower respiratory tract and to suggest that development of improved diagnostic methods is urgently needed. A molecular diagnostic test that amplifies ribosomal RNA found in the small subunit of Lophomonas spp. ribosomes has since been described by Fakhar et al. (2021).
