= Phospholipase A2 =

Peripheral membrane protein

phospholipase A_{2}
- Phospholipase cleavage sites. Note that an enzyme that displays both PLA_{1} and PLA_{2} activities is called a phospholipase B.

Identifiers
- EC no.: 3.1.1.4
- CAS no.: 9001-84-7

Databases
- BRENDA: enzyme data
- ExPASy: NiceZyme view
- KEGG: enzyme entry
- MetaCyc: metabolic pathway
- Rhea: reactions
- PDB structures: RCSB PDB PDBe PDBsum
- Gene Ontology: AmiGO / QuickGO
Search
- PMC: articles
- PubMed: articles
- NCBI: proteins

Phospholipase A_{2}
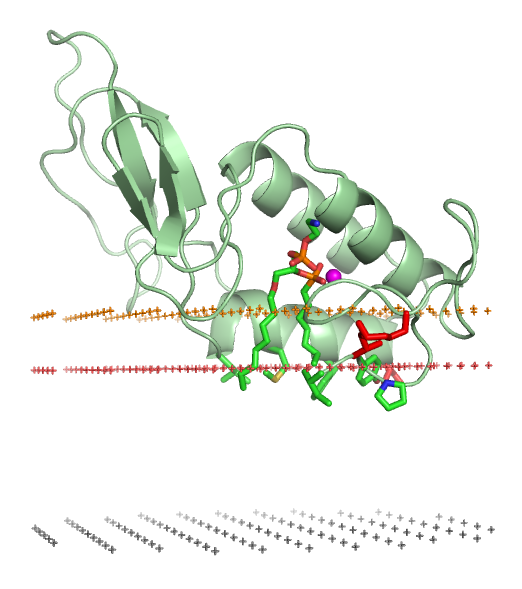
- Bee venom phospholipase A_{2} sPLA_{2}. Middle plane of the lipid bilayer - black dots. Boundary of the hydrocarbon core region - red dots (extracellular side). Layer of lipid phosphates - yellow dots.

Identifiers
- Symbol: Phospholip_A2_1
- Pfam: PF00068
- InterPro: IPR001211
- PROSITE: PDOC00109
- SCOP2: 1bbc / SCOPe / SUPFAM
- OPM superfamily: 82
- OPM protein: 1g4i
Available protein structures:
- PDB: IPR001211 PF00068 (ECOD; PDBsum)
- AlphaFold: IPR001211; PF00068

The enzyme phospholipase A_{2} (EC 3.1.1.4, PLA_{2}, systematic name phosphatidylcholine 2-acylhydrolase) catalyses the cleavage of fatty acids in position 2 of phospholipids, hydrolyzing the bond between the second fatty acid "tail" and the glycerol molecule:

phosphatidylcholine + H_{2}O = 1-acylglycerophosphocholine + a carboxylate

This particular phospholipase specifically recognizes the sn_{2} acyl bond of phospholipids and catalytically hydrolyzes the bond, releasing arachidonic acid and lysophosphatidyl choline, a precursor of lysophosphatidic acid. Upon downstream modification by cyclooxygenases or lipoxygenases, arachidonic acid is modified into active compounds called eicosanoids. Eicosanoids include prostaglandins and leukotrienes, which are categorized as anti-inflammatory and inflammatory mediators.

PLA_{2} enzymes are commonly found in mammalian tissues as well as arachnid, insect, and snake venom. Venom from bees is largely composed of melittin, which is a stimulant of PLA_{2}. Due to the increased presence and activity of PLA_{2} resulting from a snake or insect bite, arachidonic acid is released from the phospholipid membrane disproportionately. As a result, inflammation and pain occur at the site. There are also prokaryotic A_{2} phospholipases.

Additional types of phospholipases include phospholipase A_{1}, phospholipase B, phospholipase C, and phospholipase D.

== Families ==
Phospholipases A_{2} include several unrelated protein families with common enzymatic activity. Two most notable families are secreted and cytosolic phospholipases A_{2}. Other families include Ca^{2+} independent PLA_{2} (iPLA_{2}) and lipoprotein-associated PLA_{2} (Lp-PLA_{2}), also known as platelet activating factor acetylhydrolase (PAF-AH).

=== Secreted phospholipases A_{2} (sPLA_{2}) ===
The extracellular forms of phospholipases A_{2} have been isolated from different venoms (snake, bee, and wasp), and from virtually every studied mammalian tissue (including pancreas and kidney) as well as from bacteria. They require Ca^{2+} for activity.

Pancreatic sPLA_{2} serve for the initial digestion of phospholipid compounds in dietary fat. Venom phospholipases help to immobilize prey by promoting cell lysis.

In mice, group III sPLA_{2} are involved in sperm maturation, and group X are thought to be involved in sperm capacitation.

sPLA_{2} has been shown to promote inflammation in mammals by catalyzing the first step of the arachidonic acid pathway by breaking down phospholipids, resulting in the formation of fatty acids including arachidonic acid. This arachidonic acid is then metabolized to form several inflammatory and thrombogenic molecules. Excess levels of sPLA_{2} is thought to contribute to several inflammatory diseases, and has been shown to promote vascular inflammation correlating with coronary events in coronary artery disease and acute coronary syndrome, and possibly leading to acute respiratory distress syndrome and progression of tonsillitis.

In children, excess levels of sPLA_{2} have been associated with inflammation thought to exacerbate asthma and ocular surface inflammation (dry eye).

Increased sPLA_{2} activity is observed in the cerebrospinal fluid of humans with Alzheimer's disease and multiple sclerosis, and may serve as a marker of increases in permeability of the blood-cerebrospinal fluid barrier.

There are atypical members of the phospholipase A_{2} family, such as PLA2G12B, that have no phospholipase activity with typical phospholipase substrate. The lack of enzymatic activity of PLA2G12B indicates that it may have unique function distinctive from other sPLA_{2}. It has been shown that in PLA2G12B null mice, VLDL levels were greatly reduced, suggesting it could have an effect in lipoprotein secretion.

=== Cytosolic phospholipases A_{2} (cPLA_{2}) ===
The intracellular, group IV PLA_{2} are also Ca-dependent, but they have a different 3D structure and are significantly larger than secreted PLA_{2} (more than 700 residues). They include a C2 domain and a large catalytic domain.

These phospholipases are involved in cell signaling processes, such as inflammatory response. They release arachidonic acid from membrane phospholipids. Arachidonic acid is both a signaling molecule and the precursor for the synthesis of other signaling molecules termed eicosanoids. These include leukotrienes and prostaglandins. Some eicosanoids are synthesized from diacylglycerol, released from the lipid bilayer by phospholipase C (see below).

Phospholipases A_{2} can be classified based on sequence homology.

=== Lipoprotein-associated PLA_{2} (Lp-PLA_{2}) ===
Increased levels of Lp-PLA_{2} are associated with cardiac disease, and may contribute to atherosclerosis. However, the role of Lp-PLA_{2} in atherosclerosis may depend on its carrier in plasma, and several lines of evidence suggest that HDL-associated Lp-PLA_{2} may substantially contribute to the HDL antiatherogenic activities.

== Mechanism ==
Two reaction mechanisms have been suggested for sPLA_{2}s, the single-water mechanism and the assisted water mechanism. The single-water catalytic mechanism is initiated by a His-48/Asp-99/calcium complex within the active site. The calcium ion polarizes the sn-2 carbonyl oxygen. Whether it can simultaneously coordinate with the catalytic water molecule, w5, is unclear. His-48 improves the nucleophilicity of the catalytic water via a bridging second water molecule, w6. In the assisted-water mechanism, two water molecules are necessary to traverse the distance between the catalytic histidine and the ester. The basicity of His-48 is thought to be enhanced through hydrogen bonding with Asp-99. An asparagine substitution for His-48 maintains wild-type activity, as the amide functional group on asparagine can also function to lower the pK_{a}, or acid dissociation constant, of the bridging water molecule. computer simulations of the reaction mechanism of the human synovial and viper venom sPLA_{2}s suggest that both the single-water and assisted-water mechanisms are viable, as the difference in the free energy of the rate-limiting step is small. The latter is characterized as the degradation of the tetrahedral intermediate composed of a calcium coordinated oxyanion. The role of calcium can also be duplicated by other relatively small cations like cobalt and nickel. Before becoming active in digestion, the proform of PLA_{2} is activated by trypsin.

Close-up rendering of PLA_{2} active site with phosphate enzyme inhibitor. Calcium ion (pink) coordinates with phosphate (light blue). Phosphate mimics tetrahedral intermediate blocking substrate access to active site. His-48, Asp-99, and two water molecules are also shown.

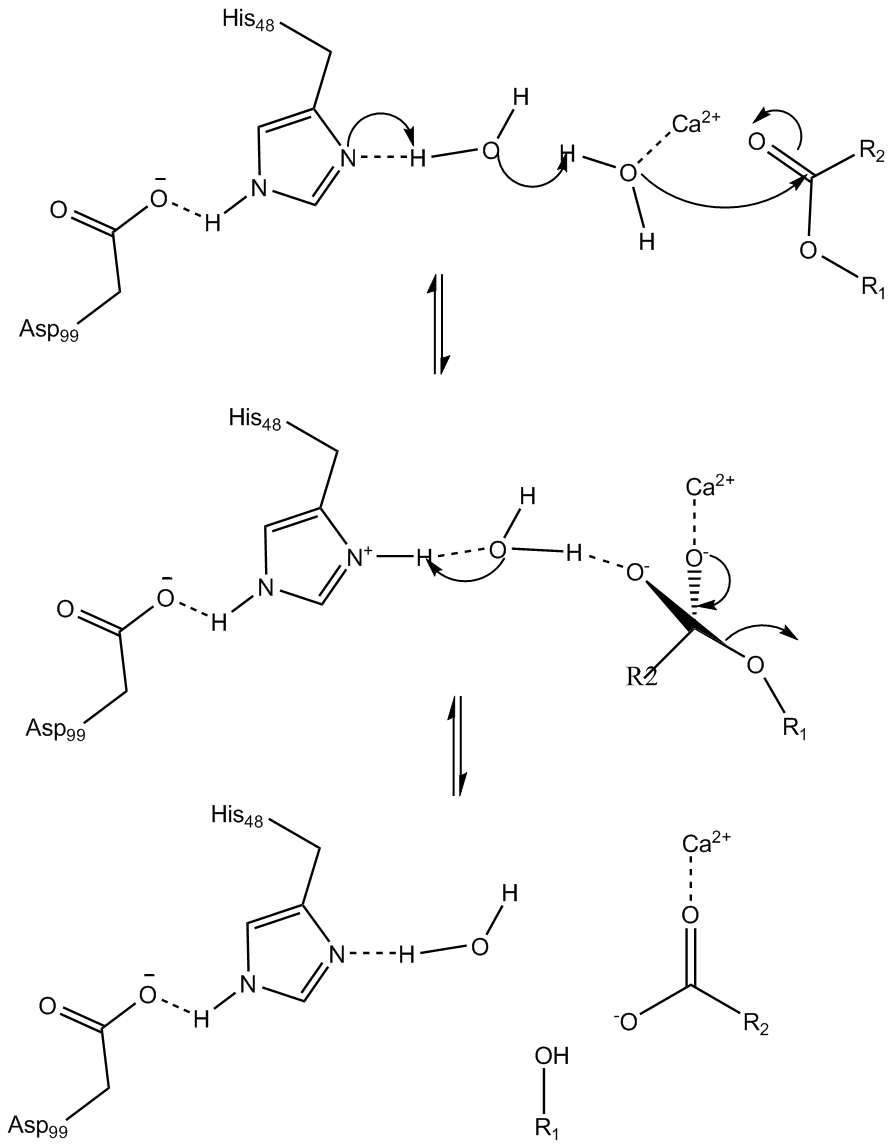
Mechanism of hydrolysis catalyzed by PLA_{2}

PLA_{2} can also be characterized as having a channel featuring a hydrophobic wall in which hydrophobic amino acid residues such as Phe, Leu, and Tyr serve to bind the substrate. Another component of PLA_{2} is the seven disulfide bridges that are influential in regulation and stable protein folding.

== Biological effects ==
PLA_{2} action can release histamine from rat peritoneal mast cells. It also causes histamine release in human basophils.

== Regulation ==
Due to the importance of PLA_{2} in inflammatory responses, regulation of the enzyme is essential. cPLA_{2} is regulated by phosphorylation and calcium concentrations. cPLA_{2} is phosphorylated by a MAPK at Serine-505. When phosphorylation is coupled with an influx of calcium ions, cPLA_{2} becomes stimulated and can translocate to the membrane to begin catalysis.

Phosphorylation of cPLA_{2} may be a result of ligand binding to receptors, including:

- 5-HT_{2} receptors
- mGLUR1
- bFGF receptor
- IFN-α receptor
- IFN-γ receptor

In the case of an inflammation, the application of glucocorticoids up-regulate (mediated at the gene level) the production of the protein lipocortin which may inhibit cPLA_{2} and reduce the inflammatory response.

== Relevance in neurological disorders ==
In normal brain cells, PLA_{2} regulation accounts for a balance between arachidonic acid's conversion into proinflammatory mediators and its reincorporation into the membrane. In the absence of strict regulation of PLA_{2} activity, a disproportionate amount of proinflammatory mediators are produced. The resulting induced oxidative stress and neuroinflammation is analogous to neurological diseases such as Alzheimer's disease, epilepsy, multiple sclerosis, ischemia. Lysophospholipids are another class of molecules released from the membrane that are upstream predecessors of platelet activating factors (PAF). Abnormal levels of potent PAF are also associated with neurological damage. An optimal enzyme inhibitor would specifically target PLA_{2} activity on neural cell membranes already under oxidative stress and potent inflammation. Thus, specific inhibitors of brain PLA_{2} could be a pharmaceutical approach to treatment of several disorders associated with neural trauma.

Increase in phospholipase A_{2} activity is an acute-phase reaction that rises during inflammation, which is also seen to be exponentially higher in low back disc herniations compared to rheumatoid arthritis. It is a mixture of inflammation and substance P that are responsible for pain.

Increased phospholipase A_{2} has also been associated with neuropsychiatric disorders such as schizophrenia and pervasive developmental disorders (such as autism), though the mechanisms involved are not known.

== Isozymes ==
Human phospholipase A_{2} isozymes include:

- Group I: PLA2G1B
- Group II: PLA2G2A, PLA2G2C, PLA2G2D, PLA2G2E, PLA2G2F
- Group III: PLA2G3
- Group IV: PLA2G4A, PLA2G4B, PLA2G4C, PLA2G4D, PLA2G4E, PLA2G4F
- Group V: PLA2G5
- Group VI: PLA2G6
- Group VII: PLA2G7
- Group X: PLA2G10
- Group XII: PLA2G12A, PLA2G12B

In addition, the following human proteins contain the phospholipase A_{2} domain:

- OC90

== See also ==
- Paul Sigler
