= CLC (gene) =

Protein-coding gene in humans

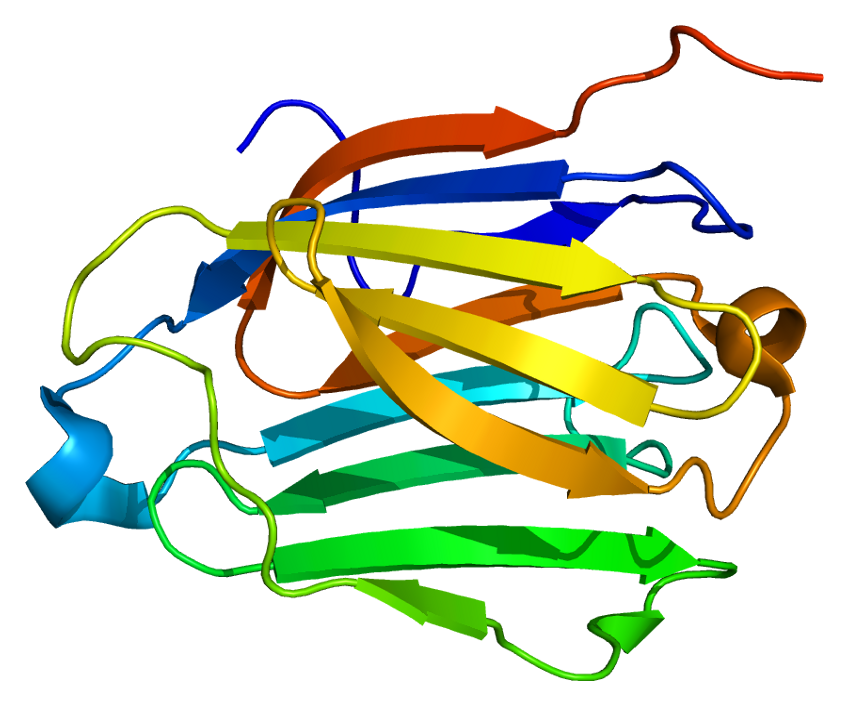

Identifiers
- Aliases: CLC, GAL10, Gal-10, LGALS10, LGALS10A, LPPL_HUMAN, Charcot-Leyden crystal galectin, galectin-10
- External IDs: OMIM: 153310; GeneCards: CLC
Available structures
PDB	Human UniProt search: PDBe RCSB
PDB	List of PDB id codes 1G86, 1HDK, 1LCL, 1QKQ

Gene location (Human)
Chr.	Chromosome 19 (human)
Band	19q13.2	Start	39,731,255 bp
Band	19q13.2	End	39,738,029 bp
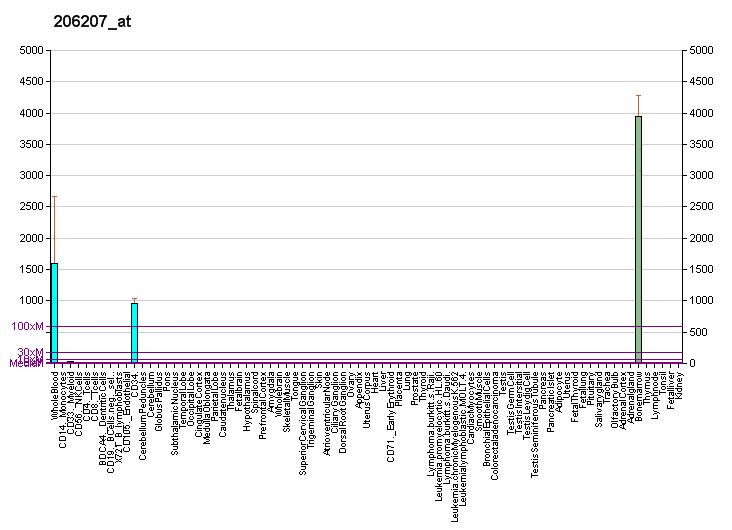
RNA expression pattern
Bgee	Human / Mouse (ortholog); Top expressed in: trabecular bone; bone marrow; bone marrow cell; testicle; monocyte; blood; gallbladder; appendix; granulocyte; mucosa of transverse colon / n/a; More reference expression data
BioGPS	More reference expression data
Gene ontology
Molecular function	cysteine-type endopeptidase activity involved in apoptotic process; lysophospholipase activity; protein binding; carbohydrate binding; identical protein binding
Cellular component	cytoplasm; cytosol; collagen-containing extracellular matrix
Biological process	multicellular organism development; T cell apoptotic process; regulation of T cell cytokine production; regulation of activated T cell proliferation; regulation of T cell anergy
Sources:Amigo / QuickGO
Orthologs
Databases	NCBI: entry; OMA: entry
Species	Human	Mouse
Entrez	1178	n/a
Ensembl	ENSG00000105205	n/a
UniProt	Q05315	n/a
RefSeq (mRNA)	NM_001828	n/a
RefSeq (protein)	NP_001819	n/a
Location (UCSC)	Chr 19: 39.73 – 39.74 Mb	n/a
PubMed search		n/a
- Wikidata
View/Edit Human

Galectin-10 is an enzyme that in humans is encoded by the CLC gene.

Lysophospholipases are enzymes that act on biological membranes to regulate the multifunctional lysophospholipids. The protein encoded by this gene is a lysophospholipase expressed in eosinophils and basophils. It hydrolyzes lysophosphatidylcholine to glycerophosphocholine and a free fatty acid. This protein may possess carbohydrate or IgE-binding activities. It is both structurally and functionally related to the galectin family of beta-galactoside binding proteins. It may be associated with inflammation and some myeloid leukemias.

== See also ==
- Charcot–Leyden crystals
