= Patatin-like phospholipase =

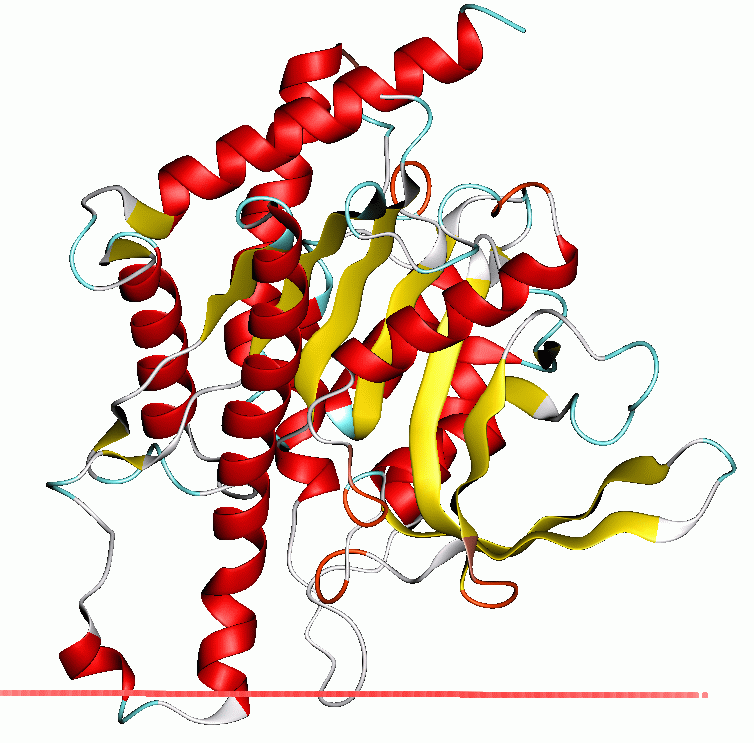
- Patatin

Identifiers
- Symbol: Patatin
- Pfam: PF01734
- InterPro: IPR002641
- PROSITE: PDOC00951
- SCOP2: 1oxw / SCOPe / SUPFAM
- OPM superfamily: 126
- OPM protein: 1oxw
- Membranome: 297
Available protein structures:
- PDB: IPR002641 PF01734 (ECOD; PDBsum)
- AlphaFold: IPR002641; PF01734

The patatin-like phospholipases are a family of enzymes found in humans and many other organisms. These proteins are related to patatin, a type of glycoprotein found in potatoes. Family members include various lipases and phospholipases found in vertebrates like adipose triglyceride lipase. Patatin is a storage protein but it also has the enzymatic activity of phospholipase, catalysing the cleavage of fatty acids from membrane lipids.

== Subfamilies ==
- Lysophospholipase patatin InterPro: IPR001423

== Human proteins containing this domain ==
PNPLA1; PNPLA2; PNPLA3; PNPLA4; PNPLA5; PNPLA6; PNPLA7; PNPLA8;
