= Lysophospholipase =

lysophospholipase

Identifiers
- EC no.: 3.1.1.5
- CAS no.: 9001-85-8

Databases
- BRENDA: enzyme data
- ExPASy: NiceZyme view
- KEGG: enzyme entry
- MetaCyc: metabolic pathway
- Rhea: reactions
- PDB structures: RCSB PDB PDBe PDBsum
- Gene Ontology: AmiGO / QuickGO
Search
- PMC: articles
- PubMed: articles
- NCBI: proteins

Lysophospholipase, catalytic region

Identifiers
- Symbol: PLA2_B
- Pfam: PF01735
- InterPro: IPR002642
- SMART: SM00022
- PROSITE: PDOC51210
Available protein structures:
- PDB: PDB: 1cjy IPR002642 PF01735 (ECOD; PDBsum)
- AlphaFold: IPR002642; PF01735

The enzyme lysophospholipase (EC 3.1.1.5) catalyzes the reaction

2-lysophosphatidylcholine + H_{2}O $\rightleftharpoons$ glycerophosphocholine + a carboxylate

This enzyme belongs to the family of hydrolases, specifically those acting on carboxylic ester bonds. This family consists of lysophospholipase / phospholipase B (EC 3.1.1.5) and cytosolic phospholipase A_{2} which also has a C2 domain InterPro: IPR000008. Phospholipase B enzymes catalyse the release of fatty acids from lysophospholipids and are capable in vitro of hydrolyzing all phospholipids extractable from yeast cells. Cytosolic phospholipase A_{2} associates with natural membranes in response to physiological increases in Ca^{2+} and selectively hydrolyses arachidonyl phospholipids, the aligned region corresponds the carboxy-terminal Ca^{2+}-independent catalytic domain of the protein as discussed in.

The systematic name of this enzyme class is 2-lysophosphatidylcholine acylhydrolase. Other names in common use include lecithinase B, lysolecithinase, phospholipase B, lysophosphatidase, lecitholipase, phosphatidase B, lysophosphatidylcholine hydrolase, lysophospholipase A1, lysophospholipase L2, lysophospholipase transacylase, neuropathy target esterase, NTE, NTE-LysoPLA, and NTE-lysophospholipase. This enzyme participates in glycerophospholipid metabolism.

== Examples ==
Human genes encoding proteins that contain this domain include:

- PLA2G4A, PLA2G4B, PLA2G4C, PLA2G4D, PLA2G4E, PLA2G4F

== See also ==
- Charcot-Leyden crystals
