= PLA2G2A =

Protein-coding gene in humans

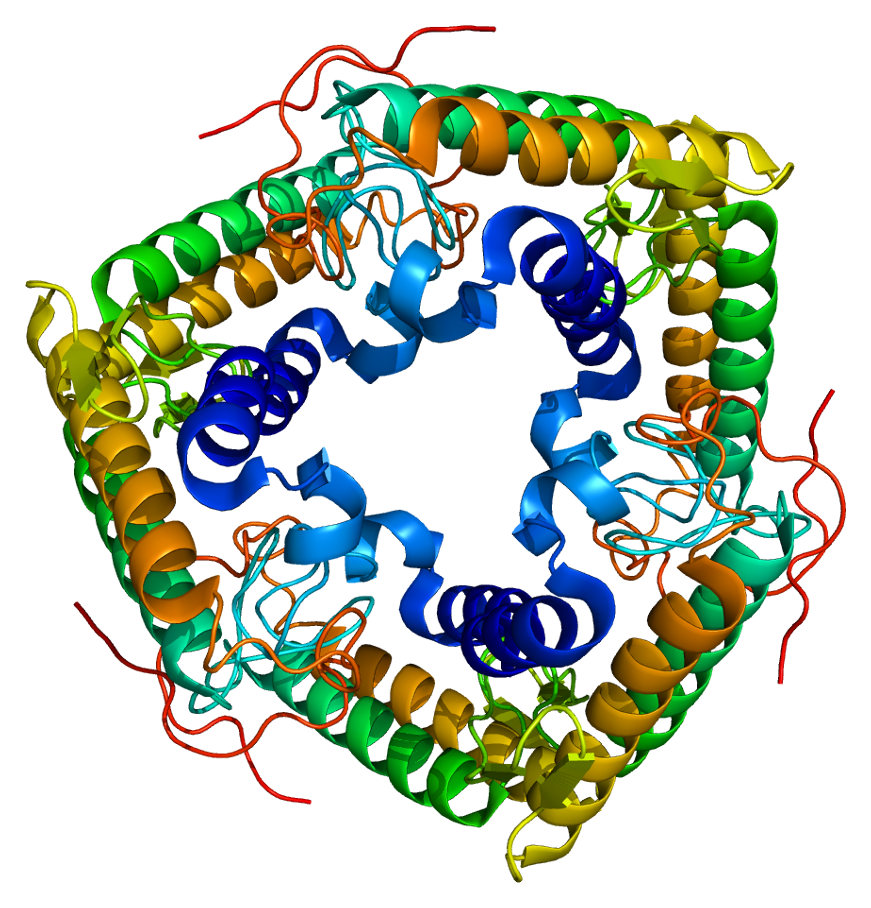

Identifiers
- Aliases: PLA2G2A, MOM1, PLA2, PLA2B, PLA2L, PLA2S, PLAS1, sPLA2, phospholipase A2 group IIA
- External IDs: OMIM: 172411; MGI: 104642; GeneCards: PLA2G2A
Available structures
PDB	Ortholog search: PDBe RCSB
PDB	List of PDB id codes 1AYP, 1BBC, 1DB4, 1DB5, 1DCY, 1J1A, 1KQU, 1KVO, 1N28, 1N29, 1POD, 1POE, 3U8B, 3U8D, 3U8H, 3U8I
Enzyme activity
EC #	BRENDA	ExPASy	KEGG	MetaCyc
3.1.1.4	↗	↗	↗	↗

Gene location (Human)
Chr.	Chromosome 1 (human)
Band	1p36.13	Start	19,975,431 bp
Band	1p36.13	End	19,980,416 bp

Gene location (Mouse)
Chr.	Chromosome 4 (mouse)
Band	4 D3|4 70.57 cM	Start	138,559,171 bp
Band	4 D3|4 70.57 cM	End	138,562,497 bp
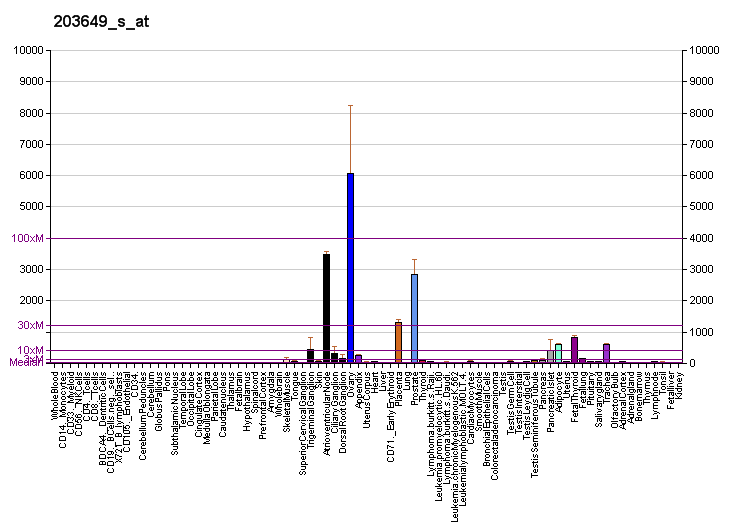
RNA expression pattern
Bgee	Human / Mouse (ortholog); Top expressed in: palpebral conjunctiva; pericardium; right coronary artery; tendon of biceps brachii; mucosa of ileum; synovial joint; gastric mucosa; right auricle of heart; left coronary artery; rectum / Top expressed in: crypt of lieberkuhn of small intestine; duodenum; jejunum; Paneth cell; ankle joint; Ileal epithelium; morula; gastrula; intercostal muscle; submandibular gland; More reference expression data
BioGPS	More reference expression data
Gene ontology
Molecular function	calcium ion binding; calcium-dependent phospholipase A2 activity; metal ion binding; hydrolase activity; phospholipid binding; phospholipase A2 activity
Cellular component	membrane; endoplasmic reticulum membrane; secretory granule; endoplasmic reticulum; perinuclear region of cytoplasm; extracellular exosome; extracellular region; plasma membrane; extracellular space
Biological process	phosphatidic acid biosynthetic process; phosphatidylserine acyl-chain remodeling; positive regulation of inflammatory response; phosphatidylethanolamine acyl-chain remodeling; lipid metabolism; phosphatidylinositol acyl-chain remodeling; lipid catabolic process; positive regulation of macrophage derived foam cell differentiation; low-density lipoprotein particle remodeling; positive regulation of ERK1 and ERK2 cascade; phosphatidylglycerol acyl-chain remodeling; phosphatidic acid metabolic process; phosphatidylcholine acyl-chain remodeling; defense response to Gram-positive bacterium; phospholipid metabolic process; antimicrobial humoral response; arachidonic acid secretion
Sources:Amigo / QuickGO
Orthologs
Databases	NCBI: entry; OMA: entry
Species	Human	Mouse
Entrez	5320	18780
Ensembl	ENSG00000188257	ENSMUSG00000058908
UniProt	P14555	P31482
RefSeq (mRNA)	NM_001161729; NM_000300; NM_001161727; NM_001161728; NM_001395463	NM_001082531; NM_011108
RefSeq (protein)	NP_000291; NP_001155199; NP_001155200; NP_001155201	NP_001076000
Location (UCSC)	Chr 1: 19.98 – 19.98 Mb	Chr 4: 138.56 – 138.56 Mb
PubMed search
- Wikidata
View/Edit Human	View/Edit Mouse

Phospholipase A_{2}, membrane associated is an enzyme that in humans is encoded by the PLA2G2A gene.

== See also ==
- Phospholipase A_{2}
