= Phosphatidylcholine—retinol O-acyltransferase =

phosphatidylcholine-retinol O-acyltransferase

Identifiers
- EC no.: 2.3.1.135
- CAS no.: 117444-03-8

Databases
- IntEnz: IntEnz view
- BRENDA: BRENDA entry
- ExPASy: NiceZyme view
- KEGG: KEGG entry
- MetaCyc: metabolic pathway
- PRIAM: profile
- PDB structures: RCSB PDB PDBe PDBsum
- Gene Ontology: AmiGO / QuickGO
Search
- PMC: articles
- PubMed: articles
- NCBI: proteins

In enzymology, a phosphatidylcholine---retinol O-acyltransferase (EC 2.3.1.135) is an enzyme that catalyzes the chemical reaction

phosphatidylcholine + retinol---[cellular-retinol-binding-protein] $\rightleftharpoons$ 2-acylglycerophosphocholine + retinyl-ester---[cellular-retinol-binding-protein]

Thus, the two substrates of this enzyme are phosphatidylcholine and [[retinol---[cellular-retinol-binding-protein]]], whereas its two products are 2-acylglycerophosphocholine and [[retinyl-ester---[cellular-retinol-binding-protein]]].

This enzyme belongs to the family of transferases, specifically those acyltransferases transferring groups other than aminoacyl groups. The systematic name of this enzyme class is phosphatidylcholine:retinol---[cellular-retinol-binding-protein] O-acyltransferase. Other names in common use include lecithin---retinol acyltransferase, phosphatidylcholine:retinol-(cellular-retinol-binding-protein), and O-acyltransferase.
