= LYPLA1 =

Protein-coding gene in the species Homo sapiens

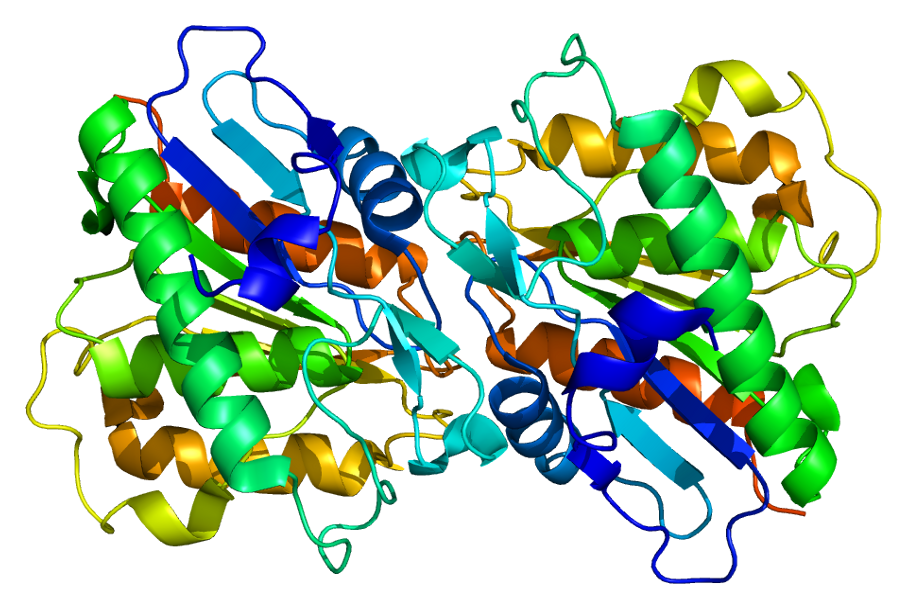

Identifiers
- Aliases: LYPLA1, APT-1, APT1, LPL-I, LPL1, hAPT1, lysophospholipase I, lysophospholipase 1
- External IDs: OMIM: 605599; MGI: 1344588; GeneCards: LYPLA1
Available structures
PDB	Ortholog search: PDBe RCSB
PDB	List of PDB id codes 1FJ2
Enzyme activity
EC #	BRENDA	ExPASy	KEGG	MetaCyc
3.1.2.22	↗	↗	↗	↗

Gene location (Human)
Chr.	Chromosome 8 (human)
Band	8q11.23	Start	54,046,367 bp
Band	8q11.23	End	54,102,017 bp

Gene location (Mouse)
Chr.	Chromosome 1 (mouse)
Band	1|1 A1	Start	4,878,011 bp
Band	1|1 A1	End	4,918,633 bp
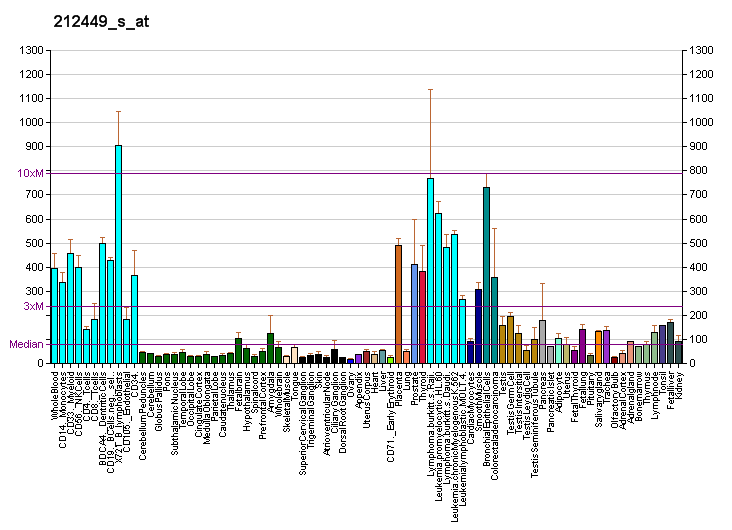

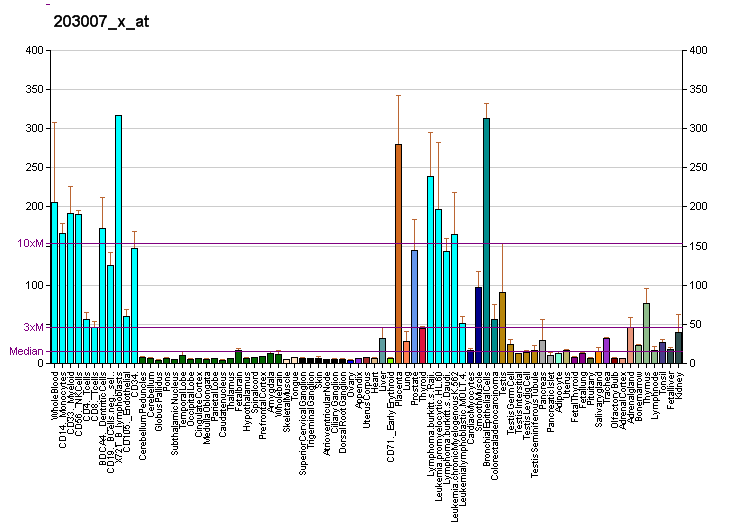
RNA expression pattern
Bgee	Human / Mouse (ortholog); Top expressed in: human penis; oral cavity; gonad; vulva; right ventricle; skin of thigh; mucosa of sigmoid colon; epithelium of nasopharynx; superior surface of tongue; biceps brachii / Top expressed in: right kidney; gallbladder; superior surface of tongue; intercostal muscle; jejunum; epithelium of small intestine; cardiac muscle tissue of left ventricle; gastrula; extensor digitorum longus muscle; plantaris muscle; More reference expression data
BioGPS	More reference expression data
Gene ontology
Molecular function	lysophospholipase activity; hydrolase activity; lipase activity; palmitoyl-(protein) hydrolase activity; carboxylic ester hydrolase activity; protein binding
Cellular component	cytoplasm; cytosol; extracellular exosome; mitochondrion
Biological process	protein depalmitoylation; regulation of nitric-oxide synthase activity; negative regulation of Golgi to plasma membrane protein transport; fatty acid metabolic process; lipid metabolism; metabolism
Sources:Amigo / QuickGO
Orthologs
Databases	NCBI: entry; OMA: entry
Species	Human	Mouse
Entrez	10434	18777
Ensembl	ENSG00000120992	ENSMUSG00000025903
UniProt	O75608; Q6IAQ1	P97823
RefSeq (mRNA)	NM_001279356; NM_001279357; NM_001279358; NM_001279359; NM_001279360 NM_006330	NM_008866; NM_001355712
RefSeq (protein)	NP_001266285; NP_001266286; NP_001266287; NP_001266288; NP_001266289 NP_006321; NP_006321.1	NP_032892; NP_001342641
Location (UCSC)	Chr 8: 54.05 – 54.1 Mb	Chr 1: 4.88 – 4.92 Mb
PubMed search
- Wikidata
View/Edit Human	View/Edit Mouse

Acyl-protein thioesterase 1 is an enzyme that in humans is encoded by the LYPLA1 gene.

Lysophospholipases are enzymes that act on biological membranes to regulate the multifunctional lysophospholipids. The protein encoded by this gene hydrolyzes lysophosphatidylcholine in both monomeric and micellar forms. The use of alternate polyadenylation sites has been found for this gene. There are alternatively spliced transcript variants described for this gene but the full length nature is not known yet.
