= PLA2G2D =

Protein-coding gene in humans

Identifiers
- Aliases: PLA2G2D, PLA2IID, SPLASH, sPLA2-IID, sPLA2S, phospholipase A2 group IID
- External IDs: OMIM: 605630; MGI: 1341796; GeneCards: PLA2G2D
Enzyme activity
EC #	BRENDA	ExPASy	KEGG	MetaCyc
3.1.1.4	↗	↗	↗	↗

Gene location (Human)
Chr.	Chromosome 1 (human)
Band	1p36.12	Start	20,111,939 bp
Band	1p36.12	End	20,119,566 bp

Gene location (Mouse)
Chr.	Chromosome 4 (mouse)
Band	4 D3|4 70.57 cM	Start	138,503,046 bp
Band	4 D3|4 70.57 cM	End	138,509,357 bp
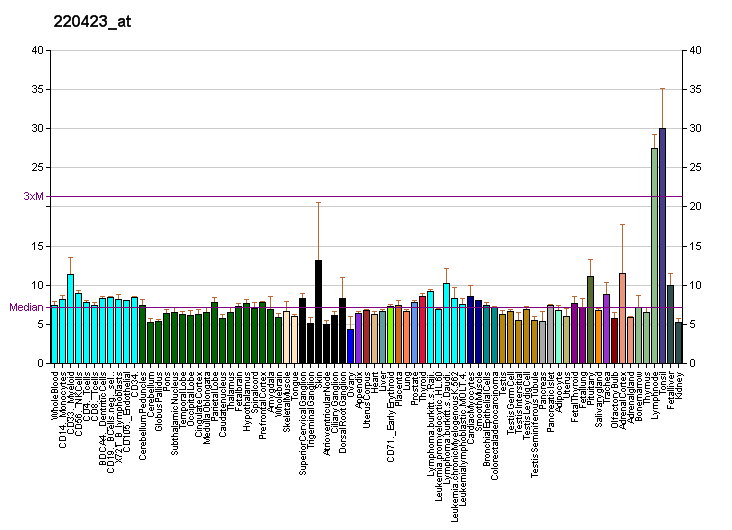
RNA expression pattern
Bgee	Human / Mouse (ortholog); Top expressed in: lymph node; appendix; thymus; testicle; bone marrow cell; rectum; spleen; mucosa of transverse colon; gallbladder; pharynx / Top expressed in: mesenteric lymph nodes; spleen; interventricular septum; thymus; sciatic nerve; subcutaneous adipose tissue; white adipose tissue; muscle of thigh; lip; lumbar subsegment of spinal cord; More reference expression data
BioGPS	More reference expression data
Gene ontology
Molecular function	calcium ion binding; phospholipase A2 activity; heparin binding; metal ion binding; heparan sulfate proteoglycan binding; hydrolase activity; phospholipid binding; calcium-dependent phospholipase A2 activity
Cellular component	extracellular region
Biological process	phosphatidic acid biosynthetic process; phosphatidylserine acyl-chain remodeling; phosphatidylethanolamine acyl-chain remodeling; CD4-positive, CD25-positive, alpha-beta regulatory T cell differentiation; lipid metabolism; phosphatidylinositol acyl-chain remodeling; lipid catabolic process; negative regulation of T cell proliferation; phosphatidylglycerol acyl-chain remodeling; inflammatory response; negative regulation of T cell activation; phosphatidylcholine acyl-chain remodeling; phospholipid metabolic process; arachidonic acid secretion
Sources:Amigo / QuickGO
Orthologs
Databases	NCBI: entry; OMA: entry
Species	Human	Mouse
Entrez	26279	18782
Ensembl	ENSG00000117215	ENSMUSG00000041202
UniProt	Q9UNK4	Q9WVF6
RefSeq (mRNA)	NM_012400; NM_001271814	NM_011109; NM_001347230
RefSeq (protein)	NP_001258743; NP_036532	NP_001334159; NP_035239
Location (UCSC)	Chr 1: 20.11 – 20.12 Mb	Chr 4: 138.5 – 138.51 Mb
PubMed search
- Wikidata
View/Edit Human	View/Edit Mouse

Group IID secretory phospholipase A_{2} is an enzyme that in humans is encoded by the PLA2G2D gene.

== See also ==
- Phospholipase A_{2}
