= PLA2G5 =

Protein-coding gene in humans

Identifiers
- Aliases: PLA2G5, FRFB, GV-PLA2, PLA2-10, hVPLA(2), phospholipase A2 group V
- External IDs: OMIM: 601192; MGI: 101899; GeneCards: PLA2G5
Available structures
PDB	Ortholog search: PDBe RCSB
PDB	List of PDB id codes 2GHN
Enzyme activity
EC #	BRENDA	ExPASy	KEGG	MetaCyc
3.1.1.4	↗	↗	↗	↗

Gene location (Human)
Chr.	Chromosome 1 (human)
Band	1p36.13	Start	20,028,179 bp
Band	1p36.13	End	20,091,911 bp

Gene location (Mouse)
Chr.	Chromosome 4 (mouse)
Band	4 D3|4 70.57 cM	Start	138,526,555 bp
Band	4 D3|4 70.57 cM	End	138,590,793 bp
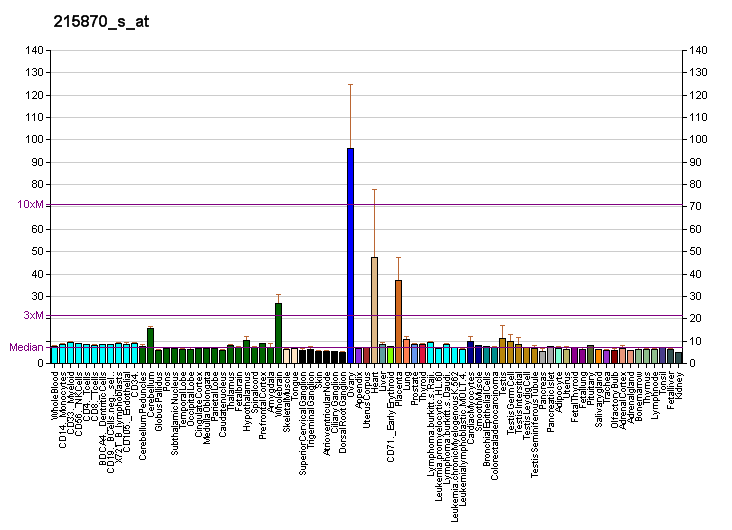

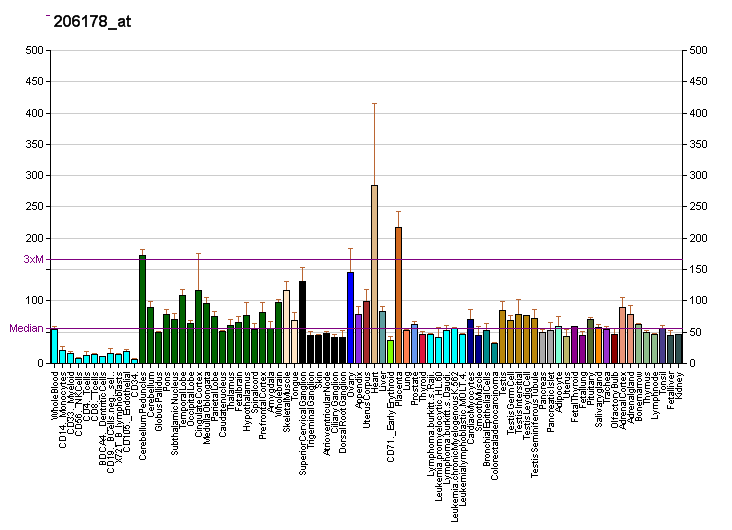

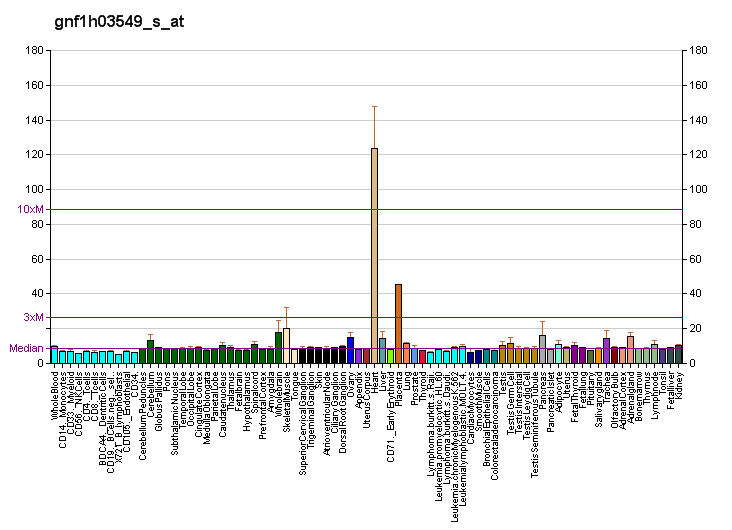
RNA expression pattern
Bgee	Human / Mouse (ortholog); Top expressed in: right auricle of heart; apex of heart; right coronary artery; left ventricle; left ovary; right ovary; left coronary artery; right ventricle; cardiac muscle tissue of right atrium; retinal pigment epithelium / Top expressed in: basal plate; neural layer of retina; molar; epithelium of lens; vestibular membrane of cochlear duct; intercostal muscle; retinal pigment epithelium; iris; trachea; utricle; More reference expression data
BioGPS	More reference expression data
Gene ontology
Molecular function	calcium ion binding; heparin binding; calcium-dependent phospholipase A2 activity; metal ion binding; hydrolase activity; phospholipase A2 activity; phospholipid binding
Cellular component	Golgi apparatus; plasma membrane; extracellular region; perinuclear region of cytoplasm; cell surface
Biological process	phosphatidic acid biosynthetic process; response to cytokine; phosphatidylserine acyl-chain remodeling; phosphatidylethanolamine acyl-chain remodeling; lipid metabolism; platelet activating factor biosynthetic process; phosphatidylinositol acyl-chain remodeling; lipid catabolic process; positive regulation of phospholipase activity; phosphatidylglycerol acyl-chain remodeling; positive regulation of ERK1 and ERK2 cascade; response to cAMP; leukotriene biosynthetic process; phosphatidylcholine acyl-chain remodeling; arachidonic acid secretion; phospholipid metabolic process; low-density lipoprotein particle remodeling; regulation of macrophage activation; negative regulation of inflammatory response
Sources:Amigo / QuickGO
Orthologs
Databases	NCBI: entry; OMA: entry
Species	Human	Mouse
Entrez	5322	18784
Ensembl	ENSG00000127472	ENSMUSG00000041193
UniProt	P39877	P97391
RefSeq (mRNA)	NM_000929	NM_001122954; NM_011110
RefSeq (protein)	NP_000920	NP_001116426; NP_035240
Location (UCSC)	Chr 1: 20.03 – 20.09 Mb	Chr 4: 138.53 – 138.59 Mb
PubMed search
- Wikidata
View/Edit Human	View/Edit Mouse

Calcium-dependent phospholipase A_{2} is an enzyme that in humans is encoded by the PLA2G5 gene.

This gene is a member of the secretory phospholipase A_{2} family. It is located in a tightly-linked cluster of secretory phospholipase A_{2} genes on chromosome 1. The encoded enzyme catalyzes the hydrolysis of membrane phospholipids to generate lysophospholipids and free fatty acids including arachidonic acid. It preferentially hydrolyzes linoleoyl-containing phosphatidylcholine substrates. Secretion of this enzyme is thought to induce inflammatory responses in neighboring cells. Alternatively spliced transcript variants have been found, but their full-length nature has not been determined.
