= PLA2G12A =

Protein-coding gene in the species Homo sapiens

Identifiers
- Aliases: PLA2G12A, GXII, PLA2G12, ROSSY, phospholipase A2 group XIIA
- External IDs: OMIM: 611652; MGI: 1913600; HomoloGene: 11328; GeneCards: PLA2G12A; OMA:PLA2G12A - orthologs

Gene location (Human)
Chr.	Chromosome 4 (human)
Band	4q25	Start	109,709,989 bp
Band	4q25	End	109,730,070 bp

Gene location (Mouse)
Chr.	Chromosome 3 (mouse)
Band	3|3 G3	Start	129,672,255 bp
Band	3|3 G3	End	129,689,474 bp
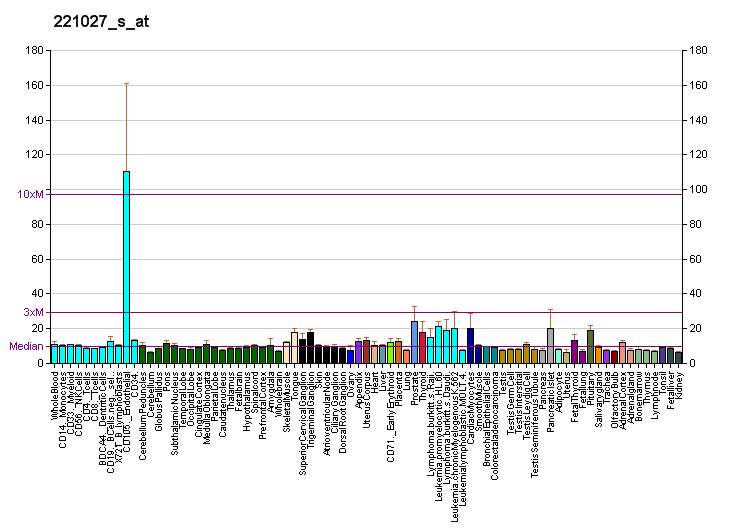
RNA expression pattern
Bgee	Human / Mouse (ortholog); Top expressed in: skin of arm; endothelial cell; cardiac muscle tissue of right atrium; myocardium of left ventricle; inferior ganglion of vagus nerve; renal medulla; pons; medulla oblongata; parietal pleura; subthalamic nucleus / Top expressed in: Ileal epithelium; plantaris muscle; interventricular septum; soleus muscle; parotid gland; extensor digitorum longus muscle; extraocular muscle; lacrimal gland; thoracic diaphragm; ankle joint; More reference expression data
BioGPS	More reference expression data
Gene ontology
Molecular function	calcium ion binding; calcium-dependent phospholipase A2 activity; metal ion binding; hydrolase activity; phospholipase A2 activity
Cellular component	cytoplasm; Golgi apparatus; intracellular anatomical structure; extracellular region; endoplasmic reticulum
Biological process	phosphatidic acid biosynthetic process; phosphatidylserine acyl-chain remodeling; phosphatidylethanolamine acyl-chain remodeling; lipid metabolism; phosphatidylinositol acyl-chain remodeling; lipid catabolic process; phosphatidylglycerol acyl-chain remodeling; phosphatidylcholine acyl-chain remodeling; phospholipid metabolic process; arachidonic acid secretion; biological process
Sources:Amigo / QuickGO
Orthologs
Species	Human	Mouse
Entrez	81579	66350
Ensembl	ENSG00000123739	ENSMUSG00000027999
UniProt	Q9BZM1; Q542Y6	Q9EPR2
RefSeq (mRNA)	NM_030821	NM_001286948; NM_023196; NM_183423
RefSeq (protein)	NP_110448; NP_110448.2	NP_001273877; NP_075685; NP_904359
Location (UCSC)	Chr 4: 109.71 – 109.73 Mb	Chr 3: 129.67 – 129.69 Mb
PubMed search
- Wikidata
View/Edit Human	View/Edit Mouse

Group XIIA secretory phospholipase A_{2} is an enzyme that in humans is encoded by the PLA2G12A gene.

== See also ==
- Phospholipase A_{2}
