= Creola bodies =

Symptom indicative of asthma

Creola bodies are a histopathologic finding indicative of asthma. Found in a patient's sputum, they are ciliated columnar cells sloughed from the bronchial mucosa of a patient with asthma. Other common findings in the sputum of asthma patients include Charcot-Leyden crystals, Curschmann's Spirals, and eosinophils (and excessive amounts of sputum).

Yoshihara et al. reported 60% of pediatric asthmatic patients demonstrating acute symptoms were found to have creola bodies in their sputum. These patients had increased levels of neutrophil-mediated cytokine activity concluding that "epithelial damage is associated with a locally enhanced chemotactic signal for and activity of neutrophils, but not eosinophils, during acute exacerbations of paediatric asthma."

Ogata et al. found significant correlations among the CrB score, the concentration of sputum ECP and %FEV1.0 (p less than 0.001). The CrB score on the day of clinical appraisal significantly correlated with the number of days of treatment needed for remission. These results were in keeping with the hypothesis that eosinophils cause desquamation of respiratory epithelial cells resulting in prolongation of asthmatic attacks. Observation of CrB seemed to be useful as a marker of duration of asthmatic attacks.
