= Phospholipase =

Class of enzymes that cleave phospholipids

Phospholipase cleavage sites. An enzyme that displays both PLA_{1} and PLA_{2} activities is called a phospholipase B.

A phospholipase is an enzyme that hydrolyzes phospholipids into fatty acids and other lipophilic substances. There are four major classes, termed A, B, C, and D, which are distinguished by the type of reaction which they catalyze:

- Phospholipase A
  - Phospholipase A_{1} – cleaves the sn-1 acyl chain (where sn refers to stereospecific numbering).
  - Phospholipase A_{2} – cleaves the sn-2 acyl chain, releasing arachidonic acid.
- Phospholipase B – cleaves both sn-1 and sn-2 acyl chains; this enzyme is also known as a lysophospholipase.
- Phospholipase C – cleaves before the phosphate, releasing diacylglycerol and a phosphate-containing head group. PLCs play a central role in signal transduction, releasing the second messenger inositol triphosphate.
- Phospholipase D – cleaves after the phosphate, releasing phosphatidic acid and an alcohol.

Types C and D are considered phosphodiesterases.

Endothelial lipase is primarily a phospholipase.

Phospholipase A_{2} acts on the intact lecithin molecule and hydrolyzes the fatty acid esterified to the second carbon atom. The resulting products are lysolecithin and a fatty acid. Phospholipase A_{2} is an enzyme present in the venom of bees, blennies and viper snakes.

== See also ==
- Patatin-like phospholipase
- Infantile neuroaxonal dystrophy
