= LPCAT1 =

Protein-coding gene in the species Homo sapiens

Identifiers
- Aliases: LPCAT1, lysophosphatidylcholine acyltransferase 1, AYTL2, PFAAP3, lpcat, AGPAT10, AGPAT9, LPCAT-1, lysoPAFAT, acyltransferase like 2
- External IDs: OMIM: 610472; MGI: 2384812; GeneCards: LPCAT1
Enzyme activity
EC #	BRENDA	ExPASy	KEGG	MetaCyc
2.3.1.23	↗	↗	↗	↗
2.3.1.25	↗	↗	↗	↗
2.3.1.51	↗	↗	↗	↗
2.3.1.67	↗	↗	↗	↗

Gene location (Human)
Chr.	Chromosome 5 (human)
Band	5p15.33	Start	1,456,480 bp
Band	5p15.33	End	1,523,962 bp

Gene location (Mouse)
Chr.	Chromosome 13 (mouse)
Band	13|13 C1	Start	73,615,316 bp
Band	13|13 C1	End	73,664,541 bp
RNA expression pattern
Bgee	Human / Mouse (ortholog); Top expressed in: upper lobe of left lung; spleen; ventricular zone; granulocyte; right lung; ganglionic eminence; blood; lymph node; monocyte; appendix / Top expressed in: left lung; left lung lobe; Rostral migratory stream; right lung; right lung lobe; retinal pigment epithelium; tibiofemoral joint; ciliary body; primary oocyte; fetal liver hematopoietic progenitor cell; More reference expression data
BioGPS	n/a
Gene ontology
Molecular function	1-alkylglycerophosphocholine O-acyltransferase activity; metal ion binding; calcium ion binding; transferase activity; acyltransferase activity; 1-alkylglycerophosphocholine O-acetyltransferase activity; 1-alkenylglycerophosphocholine O-acyltransferase activity; 1-acylglycerophosphocholine O-acyltransferase activity; 1-acylglycerol-3-phosphate O-acyltransferase activity; 2-acylglycerol-3-phosphate O-acyltransferase activity
Cellular component	integral component of membrane; Golgi apparatus; Golgi membrane; membrane; lipid droplet; endoplasmic reticulum membrane; endoplasmic reticulum; plasma membrane; azurophil granule membrane
Biological process	phospholipid biosynthetic process; retina development in camera-type eye; lipid metabolism; phosphatidylglycerol acyl-chain remodeling; positive regulation of protein catabolic process; phosphatidic acid biosynthetic process; metabolism; surfactant homeostasis; negative regulation of phosphatidylcholine biosynthetic process; phosphatidylcholine acyl-chain remodeling; phospholipid metabolic process; phosphatidylcholine biosynthetic process; neutrophil degranulation
Sources:Amigo / QuickGO
Orthologs
Databases	NCBI: entry; OMA: entry
Species	Human	Mouse
Entrez	79888	210992
Ensembl	ENSG00000275079; ENSG00000153395	ENSMUSG00000021608
UniProt	Q8NF37	Q3TFD2
RefSeq (mRNA)	NM_024830	NM_145376; NM_001368681; NM_001368682
RefSeq (protein)	NP_079106	NP_663351; NP_001355610; NP_001355611
Location (UCSC)	Chr 5: 1.46 – 1.52 Mb	Chr 13: 73.62 – 73.66 Mb
PubMed search
- Wikidata
View/Edit Human	View/Edit Mouse

acyltransferase like 2

Identifiers
- Symbol: AYTL2
- Alt. symbols: LPCAT
- NCBI gene: 79888
- HGNC: 25718
- OMIM: 610472
- RefSeq: NM_024830
- UniProt: Q8NF37

Other data
- EC number: 2.3.1.23
- Locus: Chr. 5 p15.33
Search for
- Structures: Swiss-model
- Domains: InterPro

Lysophosphatidylcholine acyltransferase 1, also known as acyltransferase like 2, is a protein in humans that is encoded by the LPCAT1 gene.

Lysophosphatidylcholine (LPC) acyltransferase (LPCAT; EC 2.3.1.23) catalyzes the conversion of LPC to phosphatidylcholine (PC) in the remodeling pathway of PC biosynthesis.

== See also ==
- Platelet-activating factor
