= PLA2G10 =

Protein-coding gene in the species Homo sapiens

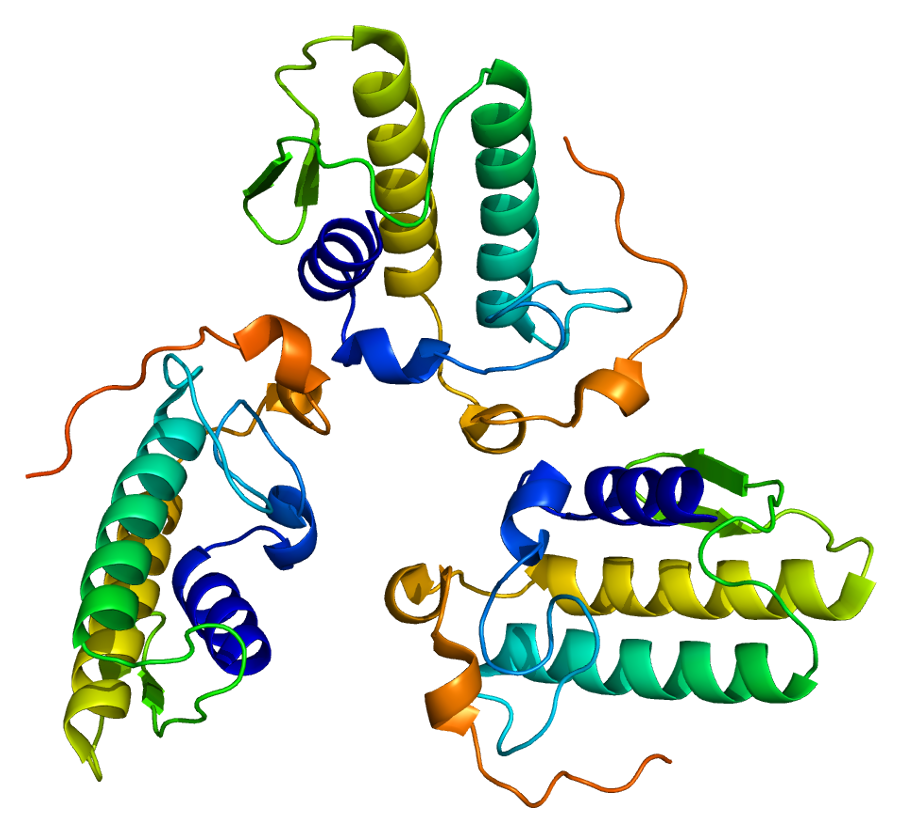
Available structures
PDB	Ortholog search: PDBe RCSB
PDB	List of PDB id codes 1LE6, 1LE7, 4UY1

Identifiers
- Aliases: PLA2G10, GXPLA2, GXSPLA2, SPLA2, sPLA2-X, phospholipase A2 group X
- External IDs: OMIM: 603603; MGI: 1347522; HomoloGene: 2636; GeneCards: PLA2G10; OMA:PLA2G10 - orthologs

Gene location (Human)
Chr.	Chromosome 16 (human)
Band	16p13.12	Start	14,672,548 bp
Band	16p13.12	End	14,694,308 bp

Gene location (Mouse)
Chr.	Chromosome 16 (mouse)
Band	16 A1|16 9.5 cM	Start	13,532,921 bp
Band	16 A1|16 9.5 cM	End	13,548,847 bp
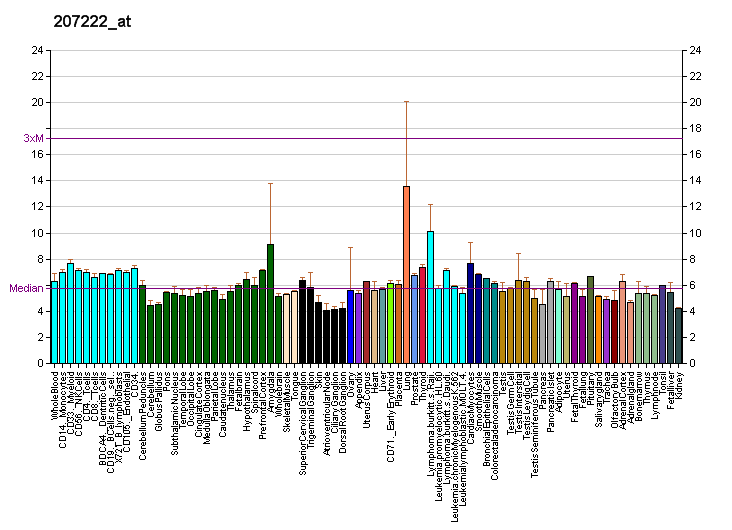
RNA expression pattern
Bgee	Human / Mouse (ortholog); Top expressed in: mucosa of transverse colon; rectum; olfactory zone of nasal mucosa; testicle; duodenum; right uterine tube; right lung; body of stomach; body of pancreas; upper lobe of left lung / Top expressed in: epithelium of stomach; mucous cell of stomach; left colon; pyloric antrum; spermatid; seminiferous tubule; Ileal epithelium; embryo; morula; blastocyst; More reference expression data
BioGPS	More reference expression data
Gene ontology
Molecular function	calcium ion binding; phospholipase A2 activity; phospholipase activity; metal ion binding; hydrolase activity; phospholipid binding; calcium-dependent phospholipase A2 activity
Cellular component	extracellular region; extracellular space
Biological process	phosphatidic acid biosynthetic process; positive regulation of protein metabolic process; phosphatidylserine acyl-chain remodeling; phosphatidylethanolamine acyl-chain remodeling; lysophospholipid transport; lipid metabolism; positive regulation of lipid storage; phosphatidylinositol acyl-chain remodeling; negative regulation of DNA-binding transcription factor activity; axon guidance; lipid catabolic process; positive regulation of prostaglandin secretion; positive regulation of macrophage derived foam cell differentiation; positive regulation of arachidonic acid secretion; phosphatidylglycerol acyl-chain remodeling; negative regulation of cholesterol efflux; cholesterol homeostasis; arachidonic acid metabolic process; phosphatidylcholine acyl-chain remodeling; regulation of macrophage activation; phospholipid metabolic process; arachidonic acid secretion; cellular response to leukemia inhibitory factor
Sources:Amigo / QuickGO
Orthologs
Species	Human	Mouse
Entrez	8399	26565
Ensembl	ENSG00000276870; ENSG00000069764	ENSMUSG00000022683
UniProt	O15496	Q9QXX3
RefSeq (mRNA)	NM_003561	NM_001291009; NM_011987
RefSeq (protein)	NP_003552	NP_001277938; NP_036117
Location (UCSC)	Chr 16: 14.67 – 14.69 Mb	Chr 16: 13.53 – 13.55 Mb
PubMed search
- Wikidata
View/Edit Human	View/Edit Mouse

Group 10 secretory phospholipase A_{2} is an enzyme that in humans is encoded by the PLA2G10 gene.

== See also ==
- Phospholipase A_{2}
