= PLA2G4B =

Protein-coding gene in the species Homo sapiens

Identifiers
- Aliases: PLA2G4B, HsT16992, cPLA2-beta, phospholipase A2 group IVB
- External IDs: OMIM: 606088; MGI: 2384819; GeneCards: PLA2G4B
Available structures
| PDB | Ortholog search: PDBe RCSB |
| PDB | List of PDB id codes 1BCI, 1CJY, 1RLW |
Enzyme activity
| EC # | BRENDA | ExPASy | KEGG | MetaCyc |
|---|---|---|---|---|
| 3.1.1.4 | ↗ | ↗ | ↗ | ↗ |
| 3.1.1.5 | ↗ | ↗ | ↗ | ↗ |

Gene location (Human)
| Chr. | Chromosome 15 (human) |
| Band | 15q15.1 | Start | 41,837,775 bp |
| Band | 15q15.1 | End | 41,848,147 bp |

Gene location (Mouse)
| Chr. | Chromosome 2 (mouse) |
| Band | 2|2 E5 | Start | 119,863,898 bp |
| Band | 2|2 E5 | End | 119,873,511 bp |
RNA expression pattern
| Bgee | Human / Mouse (ortholog); Top expressed in: right hemisphere of cerebellum; skin of abdomen; skin of leg; vagina; ectocervix; granulocyte; primary visual cortex; right lobe of thyroid gland; left lobe of thyroid gland; apex of heart / Top expressed in: esophagus; lip; lens; tail of embryo; retina; layer of retina; neural layer of retina; ventricular zone; ganglionic eminence; cerebellum; More reference expression data |
| BioGPS | n/a |
Gene ontology
| Molecular function | calcium ion binding; phospholipase activity; calcium-dependent phospholipase A2 activity; metal ion binding; calcium-dependent phospholipid binding; hydrolase activity; phospholipase A2 activity; phospholipase A1 activity; lysophospholipase activity |
| Cellular component | cytoplasm; cytosol; endosome; early endosome membrane; membrane; mitochondrial membranes; extracellular region; mitochondrion; mitochondrial inner membrane |
| Biological process | phosphatidic acid biosynthetic process; phosphatidylserine acyl-chain remodeling; phosphatidylethanolamine acyl-chain remodeling; glycerophospholipid catabolic process; lipid metabolism; lipid catabolic process; IRE1-mediated unfolded protein response; birth; phosphatidylglycerol acyl-chain remodeling; phospholipid catabolic process; phospholipid metabolic process; metabolism; inflammatory response; arachidonic acid metabolic process; phosphatidylcholine acyl-chain remodeling; calcium-mediated signaling |
Sources:Amigo / QuickGO
Orthologs
| Databases | NCBI: entry; OMA: entry |
| Species | Human | Mouse |
| Entrez | 100137049 | 211429 |
| Ensembl | ENSG00000243708 | ENSMUSG00000098488 |
| UniProt | P0C869 | P0C871 |
| RefSeq (mRNA) | NM_001114633 | NM_145378 |
| RefSeq (protein) | NP_001185517; NP_005081 | NP_663353 |
| Location (UCSC) | Chr 15: 41.84 – 41.85 Mb | Chr 2: 119.86 – 119.87 Mb |
| PubMed search |
- Wikidata
| View/Edit Human | View/Edit Mouse |

Phospholipase A_{2}, group IVB (cytosolic) is an enzyme that in humans is encoded by the PLA2G4B gene. In many tissues PLA2G4B forms a readthrough transcript with JMJD7, and is predicted to produce a fusion protein.

== See also ==
- Phospholipase A_{2}
