= Hans Curschmann =

German physician and neurologist

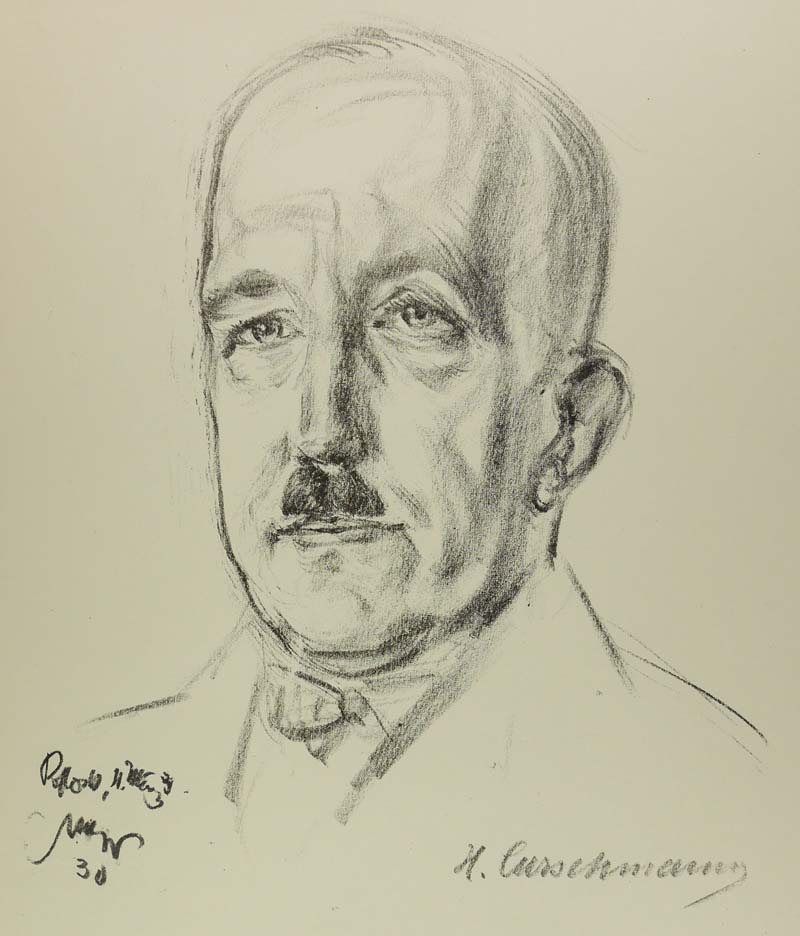
Emil Stumpp: Hans Curschmann (1930)

Hans Heinrich Curschmann (14 August 1875 in Berlin – 1 March 1950) was a German physician and neurologist remembered for Curschmann-Batten-Steinert syndrome.

He attended universities in Freiberg, Leipzig and Munich, earning his doctorate in 1900. From 1900 to 1907 he worked in Leipzig, Heidelberg, Berlin and Tübingen, and from 1907 to 1916 he was the senior physician at the city hospital in Mainz. In 1916 he became director of the medical clinic of Rostock, and he became professor in 1921.

The "Curschmann-Klinik" in Timmendorfer Strand, a specialized hospital for heart attack after-care, is named after him.
