= Curschmann's spirals =

Microscopic finding in the sputum of asthmatics

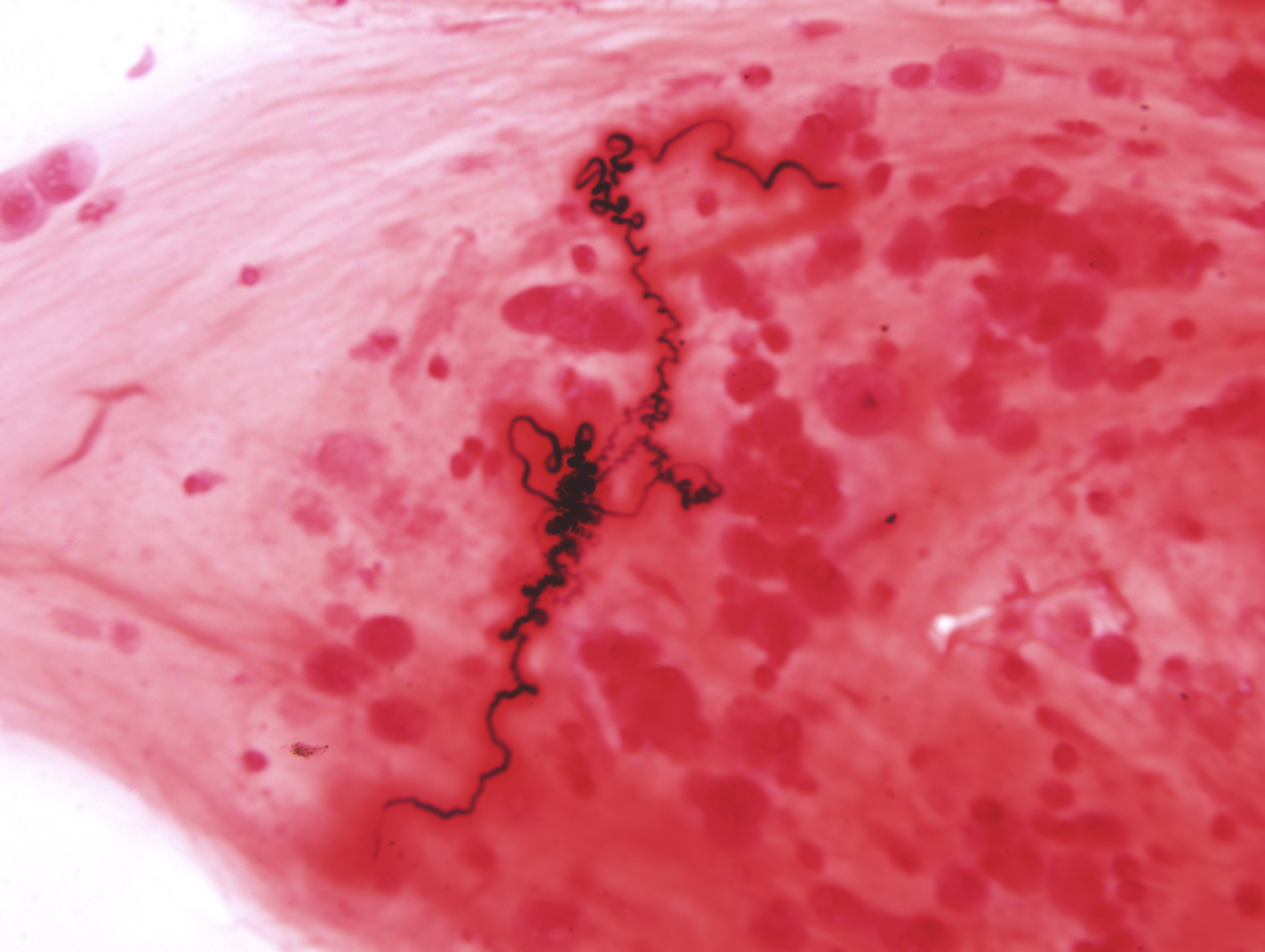
Curschmann's spiral

Curschmann's spirals are a microscopic finding in the sputum of asthmatics. They are spiral-shaped mucus plugs from subepithelial mucous gland ducts of bronchi. They may occur in several different lung diseases and may refer to parts of the desquamated epithelium seen in lavages from asthmatic patients. These microscopic casts are named after German physician Heinrich Curschmann (1846–1910). They are often seen in association with creola bodies and Charcot-Leyden crystals. They are elongated microscopic mucous casts from small bronchi and are often found in sputum samples from patients with bronchial asthma. They can be stretched out to a length of around 2 cm and can sometimes be longer. They have a central core that may be ensheathed in cell debris and mucus.
