= Phospholipase B =

Mammalian protein found in Homo sapiens

PLB1

Identifiers
- Aliases: PLB1, PLB, PLB/LIP, hPLB, phospholipase B1
- External IDs: OMIM: 610179; MGI: 1922406; HomoloGene: 82108; GeneCards: PLB1; OMA:PLB1 - orthologs
Enzyme activity
EC #	BRENDA	ExPASy	KEGG	MetaCyc
3.1.1.3	↗	↗	↗	↗
3.1.1.4	↗	↗	↗	↗
3.1.1.5	↗	↗	↗	↗

Gene location (Human)
Chr.	Chromosome 2 (human)
Band	2p23.2	Start	28,457,145 bp
Band	2p23.2	End	28,644,142 bp

Gene location (Mouse)
Chr.	Chromosome 5 (mouse)
Band	5|5 B1	Start	32,390,052 bp
Band	5|5 B1	End	32,523,864 bp
RNA expression pattern
Bgee	Human / Mouse (ortholog); Top expressed in: monocyte; mucosa of ileum; blood; granulocyte; testicle; Descending thoracic aorta; spleen; right coronary artery; appendix; smooth muscle tissue / Top expressed in: spermatid; seminiferous tubule; right lung lobe; blastocyst; skin of abdomen; lumbar subsegment of spinal cord; esophagus; left lung lobe; thymus; jejunum; More reference expression data
BioGPS	n/a
Gene ontology
Molecular function	lysophospholipase activity; hydrolase activity; lipase activity; hydrolase activity, acting on ester bonds; phospholipase A2 activity; retinyl-palmitate esterase activity; phospholipase activity
Cellular component	integral component of membrane; plasma membrane; apical plasma membrane; membrane; brush border membrane
Biological process	lipid catabolic process; positive regulation of acrosome reaction; phosphatidylcholine acyl-chain remodeling; retinoid metabolic process; lipid metabolism; retinol metabolic process; phospholipid metabolic process
Sources:Amigo / QuickGO
Orthologs
Species	Human	Mouse
Entrez	151056	665270
Ensembl	ENSG00000163803	ENSMUSG00000029134
UniProt	Q6P1J6	Q3TTY0
RefSeq (mRNA)	NM_001170585; NM_153021	NM_001081407; NM_030072; NM_172147
RefSeq (protein)	NP_001164056; NP_694566	NP_001074876; NP_084348; NP_742159
Location (UCSC)	Chr 2: 28.46 – 28.64 Mb	Chr 5: 32.39 – 32.52 Mb
PubMed search
- Wikidata
View/Edit Human	View/Edit Mouse

phospholipase B1

Identifiers
- Symbol: PLB1
- NCBI gene: 151056
- HGNC: 30041
- OMIM: 610179
- RefSeq: NM_153021
- UniProt: Q6P1J6

Other data
- Locus: Chr. 2 p23.3
Search for
- Structures: Swiss-model
- Domains: InterPro

Phospholipase B, also known as lysophospholipase, is an enzyme with a combination of both PLA_{1} and PLA_{2} activities; that is, it can cleave acyl chains from both the sn-1 and sn-2 positions of a phospholipid. In general, it acts on lysolecithin (which is formed by the action of PLA_{2} on lecithin).

Phospholipase cleavage sites. An enzyme that displays both PLA_{1} and PLA_{2} activities is called a phospholipase B.

== See also ==
- Phospholipase
