= 2-acylglycerophosphocholine O-acyltransferase =

Class of enzymes

Identifiers
- EC no.: 2.3.1.62
- CAS no.: 64295-73-4

Databases
- IntEnz: IntEnz view
- BRENDA: BRENDA entry
- ExPASy: NiceZyme view
- KEGG: KEGG entry
- MetaCyc: metabolic pathway
- PRIAM: profile
- PDB structures: RCSB PDB PDBe PDBsum
- Gene Ontology: AmiGO / QuickGO
Search
- PMC: articles
- PubMed: articles
- NCBI: proteins

In enzymology, a 2-acylglycerophosphocholine O-acyltransferase (EC 2.3.1.62) is an enzyme that catalyzes the chemical reaction

acyl-CoA + 2-acyl-sn-glycero-3-phosphocholine $\rightleftharpoons$ CoA + phosphatidylcholine

Thus, the two substrates of this enzyme are acyl-CoA and 2-acyl-sn-glycero-3-phosphocholine, whereas its two products are CoA and phosphatidylcholine.

This enzyme belongs to the family of transferases, specifically those acyltransferases transferring groups other than aminoacyl groups. The systematic name of this enzyme class is acyl-CoA:2-acyl-sn-glycero-3-phosphocholine O-acyltransferase. Other names in common use include 2-acylglycerol-3-phosphorylcholine acyltransferase, and 2-acylglycerophosphocholine acyltransferase. This enzyme participates in glycerophospholipid metabolism.
