= Lysosomal phospholipase A2 =

Protein-coding gene in the species Homo sapiens

PLA2G15

Identifiers
- Aliases: PLA2G15, ACS, GXVPLA2, LLPL, LPLA2, LYPLA3, phospholipase A2 group XV
- External IDs: OMIM: 609362; MGI: 2178076; GeneCards: PLA2G15
Available structures
PDB	Ortholog search: PDBe RCSB
PDB	List of PDB id codes 4X90, 4X91, 4X92, 4X93, 4X94, 4X95, 4X97
Enzyme activity
EC #	BRENDA	ExPASy	KEGG	MetaCyc
3.1.1.4	↗	↗	↗	↗
3.1.1.5	↗	↗	↗	↗
3.1.1.32	↗	↗	↗	↗

Gene location (Human)
Chr.	Chromosome 16 (human)
Band	16q22.1	Start	68,245,304 bp
Band	16q22.1	End	68,261,058 bp

Gene location (Mouse)
Chr.	Chromosome 8 (mouse)
Band	8|8 D3	Start	106,877,031 bp
Band	8|8 D3	End	106,891,347 bp
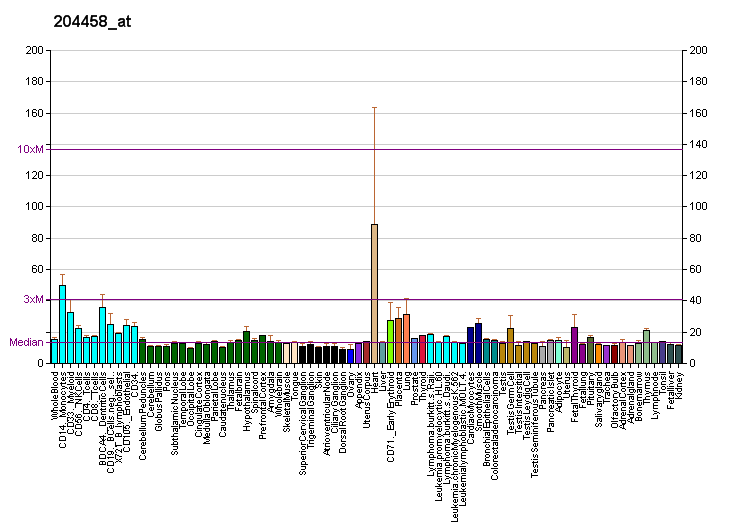
RNA expression pattern
Bgee	Human / Mouse (ortholog); Top expressed in: gastrocnemius muscle; apex of heart; muscle of thigh; left ventricle; right auricle of heart; right hemisphere of cerebellum; stromal cell of endometrium; glutes; right lobe of liver; monocyte / Top expressed in: stroma of bone marrow; secondary oocyte; primary oocyte; blastocyst; blastocyst; zygote; calvaria; morula; lumbar spinal ganglion; spleen; More reference expression data
BioGPS	More reference expression data
Gene ontology
Molecular function	transferase activity; O-acyltransferase activity; lysophospholipase activity; acyltransferase activity; hydrolase activity; phospholipid binding; calcium-independent phospholipase A2 activity
Cellular component	membrane; mitochondrion; lysosome; extracellular exosome; extracellular space; nucleoplasm; intracellular membrane-bounded organelle; extracellular region
Biological process	fatty acid catabolic process; phosphatidylcholine catabolic process; ceramide metabolic process; lipid metabolism; fatty acid metabolic process; lipid catabolic process; phosphatidylethanolamine catabolic process; glycerophospholipid metabolic process; phosphatidylcholine metabolic process; phospholipid metabolic process
Sources:Amigo / QuickGO
Orthologs
Databases	NCBI: entry; OMA: entry
Species	Human	Mouse
Entrez	23659	192654
Ensembl	ENSG00000103066	ENSMUSG00000031903
UniProt	Q8NCC3	Q8VEB4
RefSeq (mRNA)	NM_012320; NM_001363551	NM_133792; NM_001357319
RefSeq (protein)	NP_036452; NP_001350480	NP_598553; NP_001344248
Location (UCSC)	Chr 16: 68.25 – 68.26 Mb	Chr 8: 106.88 – 106.89 Mb
PubMed search
- Wikidata
View/Edit Human	View/Edit Mouse

Lysosomal phospholipase A2 (LPLA2), also known as Phospholipase A2 group XV, is an enzyme that in humans is encoded by the PLA2G15 gene (previously LYPLA3).

Lysophospholipases are enzymes that act on biological membranes to regulate the multifunctional lysophospholipids. The protein encoded by this gene hydrolyzes lysophosphatidylcholine to glycerophosphorylcholine and a free fatty acid. This enzyme is present in the plasma and thought to be associated with high-density lipoprotein. A later paper contradicts the function of this gene. It demonstrates that this gene encodes a lysosomal enzyme instead of a lysophospholipase and has both calcium-independent phospholipase A2 and transacylase activities.
