= Heinrich Curschmann =

German internist (1846–1910)

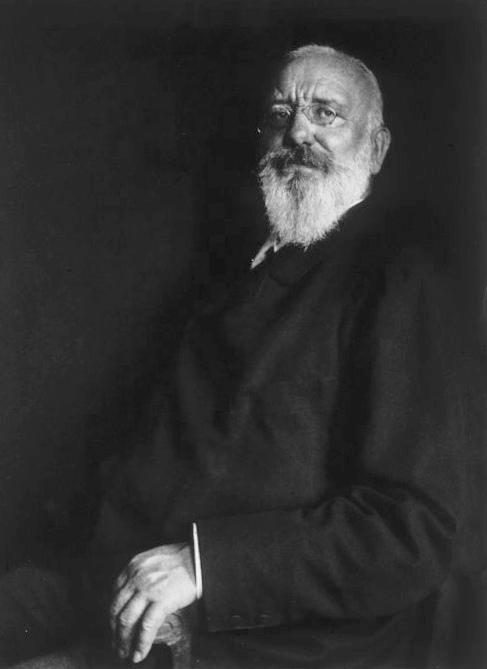
Heinrich Curschmann (1846–1910)

Heinrich Curschmann (28 June 1846 – 6 May 1910) was a German internist who was a native of Giessen.

From 1863 to 1868 he studied medicine at the University of Giessen, and afterwards worked as an assistant physician at the Rochusspital in Mainz. In 1875, he received his habilitation for internal medicine at the University of Berlin, and from 1879 to 1888 served as director at the state hospital in Hamburg. From 1888 to 1910 he was a professor of internal medicine at the University of Leipzig, serving as academic rector in 1906/07.

Curschmann is remembered for the 1894 publication of "Klinische Abbildungen" (Clinical Illustrations), a collection of photos involving changes to the outer human form caused by internal disease. "Klinische Abbildungen" is considered to be a major pioneer work in medical photography. His treatise "Der Unterleibstyphus and Das Fleckenfieber", was later translated into English and published as "Typhoid fever and typhus fever" (1901).

Curschmann's name is lent to a number of eponymous medical terms, including Curschmann's disease, also known as hyaloserositis of the liver; Curschmann's cannula, a medical instrument; and Curschmann's spirals, described as coiled mucinous fibrils sometimes found in the sputum in bronchial asthma.
