= PLA2G4C =

Protein-coding gene in the species Homo sapiens

Identifiers
- Aliases: PLA2G4C, CPLA2-gamma, phospholipase A2 group IVC
- External IDs: OMIM: 603602; MGI: 1196403; HomoloGene: 115256; GeneCards: PLA2G4C; OMA:PLA2G4C - orthologs

Gene location (Human)
Chr.	Chromosome 19 (human)
Band	19q13.33	Start	48,047,843 bp
Band	19q13.33	End	48,110,817 bp

Gene location (Mouse)
Chr.	Chromosome 7 (mouse)
Band	7 A1|7 7.84 cM	Start	13,058,580 bp
Band	7 A1|7 7.84 cM	End	13,094,597 bp
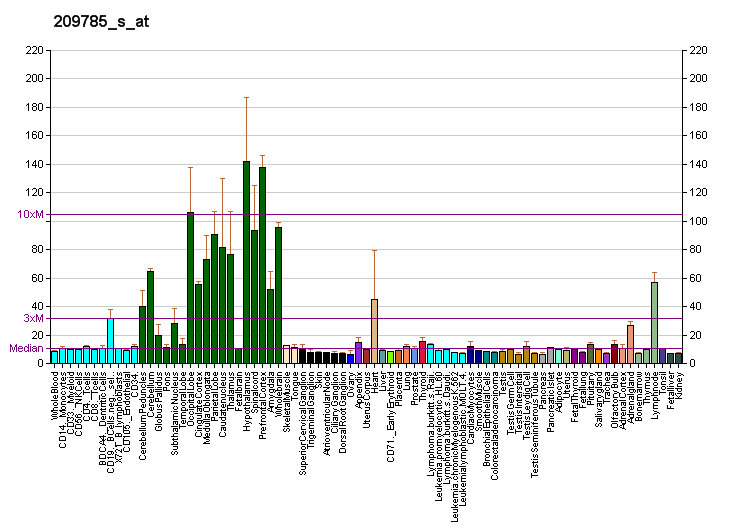
RNA expression pattern
Bgee	Human / Mouse (ortholog); Top expressed in: glutes; inferior ganglion of vagus nerve; muscle of thigh; C1 segment; vastus lateralis muscle; corpus callosum; right hemisphere of cerebellum; apex of heart; Skeletal muscle tissue of rectus abdominis; triceps brachii muscle / Top expressed in: zygote; secondary oocyte; primary oocyte; epithelium of stomach; lumbar spinal ganglion; Paneth cell; morula; parotid gland; tail of embryo; embryo; More reference expression data
BioGPS	More reference expression data
Gene ontology
Molecular function	phospholipase activity; calcium-independent phospholipase A2 activity; phospholipid binding; hydrolase activity; phospholipase A2 activity; phospholipase A1 activity; lysophospholipase activity; calcium ion binding; calcium-dependent phospholipid binding; calcium-dependent phospholipase A2 activity
Cellular component	cytosol; endoplasmic reticulum membrane; membrane; nuclear envelope; nucleoplasm; cell cortex; cytoplasm
Biological process	intracellular signal transduction; phosphatidylethanolamine acyl-chain remodeling; glycerophospholipid catabolic process; lipid metabolism; phosphatidylinositol acyl-chain remodeling; lipid catabolic process; birth; phospholipid catabolic process; phospholipid metabolic process; metabolism; inflammatory response; arachidonic acid metabolic process; phosphatidylcholine acyl-chain remodeling
Sources:Amigo / QuickGO
Orthologs
Species	Human	Mouse
Entrez	8605	232889
Ensembl	ENSG00000105499	ENSMUSG00000033847
UniProt	Q9UP65	Q64GA5
RefSeq (mRNA)	NM_001159322; NM_001159323; NM_003706	NM_001004762; NM_001168504
RefSeq (protein)	NP_001152794; NP_001152795; NP_003697; NP_003697.2	NP_001004762; NP_001161976
Location (UCSC)	Chr 19: 48.05 – 48.11 Mb	Chr 7: 13.06 – 13.09 Mb
PubMed search
- Wikidata
View/Edit Human	View/Edit Mouse

Cytosolic phospholipase A_{2} gamma is an enzyme that in humans is encoded by the PLA2G4C gene.

== See also ==
- Phospholipase A_{2}
