= Phospholipid:diacylglycerol acyltransferase =

phospholipid:diacylglycerol acyltransferase

Identifiers
- EC no.: 2.3.1.158

Databases
- IntEnz: IntEnz view
- BRENDA: BRENDA entry
- ExPASy: NiceZyme view
- KEGG: KEGG entry
- MetaCyc: metabolic pathway
- PRIAM: profile
- PDB structures: RCSB PDB PDBe PDBsum
- Gene Ontology: AmiGO / QuickGO
Search
- PMC: articles
- PubMed: articles
- NCBI: proteins

Beta-secretasePhospholipid:diacylglycerol acyltransferase

Identifiers
- Symbol: BACE
- Pfam: PF02450
- OPM superfamily: 127
- OPM protein: 4x96
- Membranome: 271
Available protein structures:
- Pfam: structures / ECOD
- PDB: RCSB PDB; PDBe; PDBj
- PDBsum: structure summary

In enzymology, a phospholipid:diacylglycerol acyltransferase (EC 2.3.1.158) is an enzyme that catalyzes the chemical reaction

phospholipid + 1,2-diacylglycerol $\rightleftharpoons$ lysophospholipid + triacylglycerol

Thus, the two substrates of this enzyme are phospholipid and 1,2-diacylglycerol, whereas its two products are lysophospholipid and triacylglycerol.

This enzyme belongs to the family of transferases, specifically those acyltransferases transferring groups other than aminoacyl groups. The systematic name of this enzyme class is phospholipid:1,2-diacyl-sn-glycerol O-acyltransferase. This enzyme is also called PDAT. This enzyme participates in glycerolipid metabolism.

An important human protein from this family is lecithin–cholesterol acyltransferase.
