= PNPLA8 =

Human gene on the 7th chromosome

Identifiers
- Aliases: PNPLA8, IPLA2(GAMMA), IPLA2-2, IPLA2G, iPLA2gamma, MMLA, PNPLA-gamma, patatin like phospholipase domain containing 8
- External IDs: OMIM: 612123; MGI: 1914702; GeneCards: PNPLA8
Enzyme activity
EC #	BRENDA	ExPASy	KEGG	MetaCyc
3.1.1.5	↗	↗	↗	↗

Gene location (Human)
Chr.	Chromosome 7 (human)
Band	7q31.1	Start	108,470,417 bp
Band	7q31.1	End	108,569,666 bp

Gene location (Mouse)
Chr.	Chromosome 12 (mouse)
Band	12|12 B2	Start	44,268,153 bp
Band	12|12 B2	End	44,369,315 bp
RNA expression pattern
Bgee	Human / Mouse (ortholog); Top expressed in: endothelial cell; pancreatic epithelial cell; tibialis anterior muscle; deltoid muscle; entorhinal cortex; myocardium of left ventricle; pars compacta; right ventricle; pars reticulata; corpus callosum / Top expressed in: muscle of thigh; brown adipose tissue; intercostal muscle; vastus lateralis muscle; temporal muscle; myocardium of ventricle; sternocleidomastoid muscle; triceps brachii muscle; mammary gland; soleus muscle; More reference expression data
BioGPS	n/a
Gene ontology
Molecular function	lysophospholipase activity; calcium-independent phospholipase A2 activity; hydrolase activity; ATP binding; phospholipase A2 activity
Cellular component	cytoplasm; integral component of membrane; Golgi apparatus; endoplasmic reticulum membrane; membrane; Golgi membrane; peroxisomal membrane; peroxisome; intracellular anatomical structure; endoplasmic reticulum; perinuclear region of cytoplasm
Biological process	linoleic acid metabolic process; phosphatidylethanolamine acyl-chain remodeling; phosphatidylcholine catabolic process; lipid metabolism; cell death; fatty acid metabolic process; lipid catabolic process; phosphatidylethanolamine catabolic process; prostaglandin biosynthetic process; metabolism; arachidonic acid metabolic process; phosphatidylcholine acyl-chain remodeling; arachidonic acid secretion
Sources:Amigo / QuickGO
Orthologs
Databases	NCBI: entry; OMA: entry
Species	Human	Mouse
Entrez	50640	67452
Ensembl	ENSG00000135241	ENSMUSG00000036257
UniProt	Q9NP80	Q8K1N1
RefSeq (mRNA)	NM_001256007; NM_001256008; NM_001256009; NM_001256010; NM_001256011 NM_015723	NM_026164
RefSeq (protein)	NP_001242936; NP_001242937; NP_001242938; NP_001242939; NP_001242940 NP_056538	NP_080440
Location (UCSC)	Chr 7: 108.47 – 108.57 Mb	Chr 12: 44.27 – 44.37 Mb
PubMed search
- Wikidata
View/Edit Human	View/Edit Mouse

Calcium-independent phospholipase A2-gamma is an enzyme that in humans is encoded by the PNPLA8 gene.
