= Charcot–Leyden crystals =

Microscopic crystals composed of eosinophil protein galectin-10

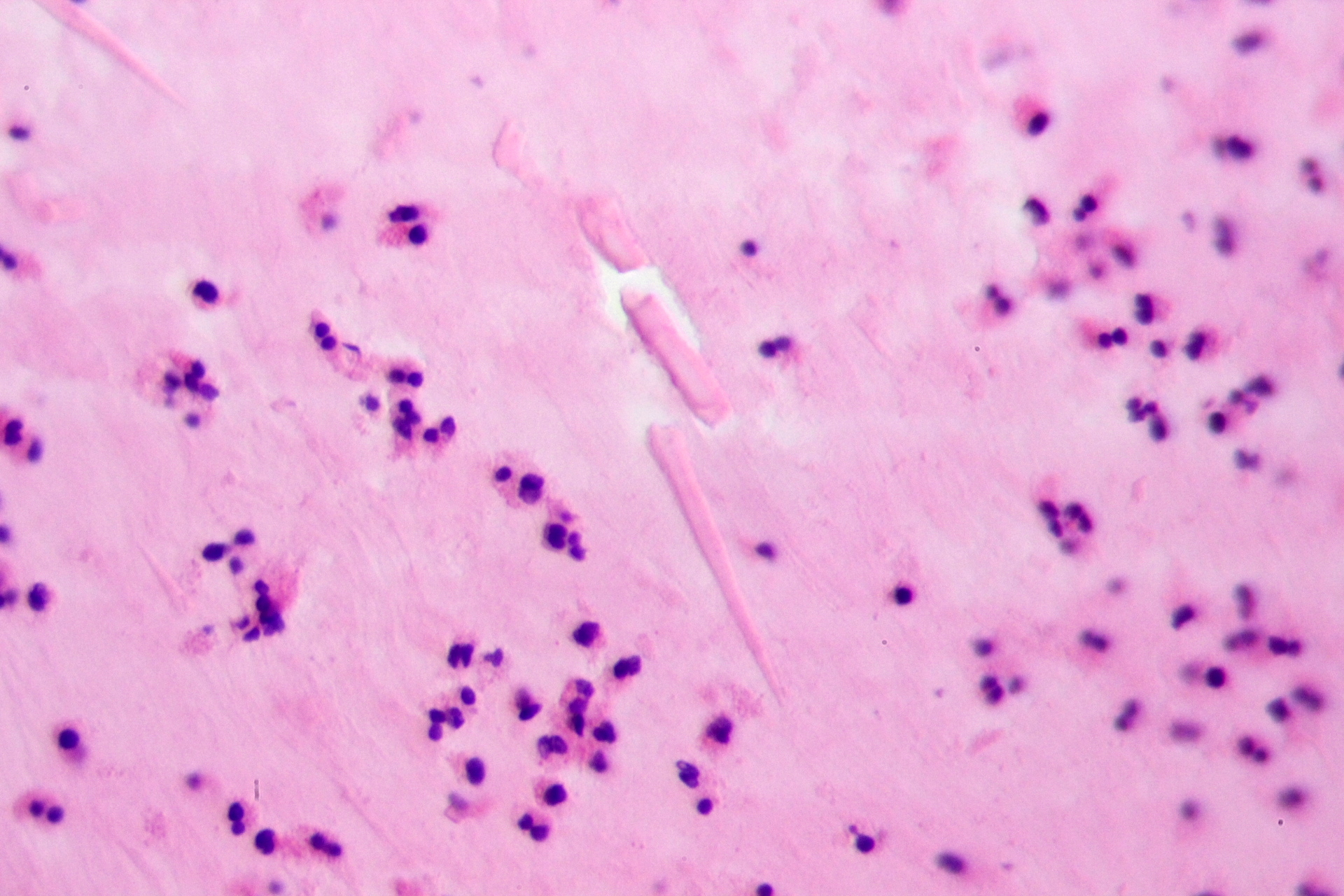
Charcot–Leyden crystals and eosinophil granulocytes in allergic sinusitis.

Charcot–Leyden crystals are microscopic crystals composed of eosinophil protein galectin-10 found in people who have allergic diseases such as asthma or parasitic infections such as parasitic pneumonia or ascariasis.

== Appearance ==
Charcot–Leyden crystals are composed of an eosinophilic lysophospholipase binding protein called Galectin-10. They vary in size and may be as large as 50 μm in length. Charcot–Leyden crystals are slender and pointed at both ends, consisting of a pair of hexagonal pyramids joined at their bases. Normally colorless, they are stained purplish-red by trichrome.

== Clinical significance ==
They are indicative of a disease involving eosinophilic inflammation or proliferation, such as is found in allergic reactions (asthma, bronchitis, allergic rhinitis and rhinosinusitis) and parasitic infections such as Entamoeba histolytica, Necator americanus, and Ancylostoma duodenale.

Charcot–Leyden crystals are often seen pathologically in patients with bronchial asthma.

== History ==
Friedrich Albert von Zenker was the first to notice these crystals, doing so in 1851, after which they were described jointly by Jean-Martin Charcot and Charles-Philippe Robin in 1853, then in 1872 by Ernst Viktor von Leyden.

== See also ==
- Curschmann's Spirals
