= Perifosine =

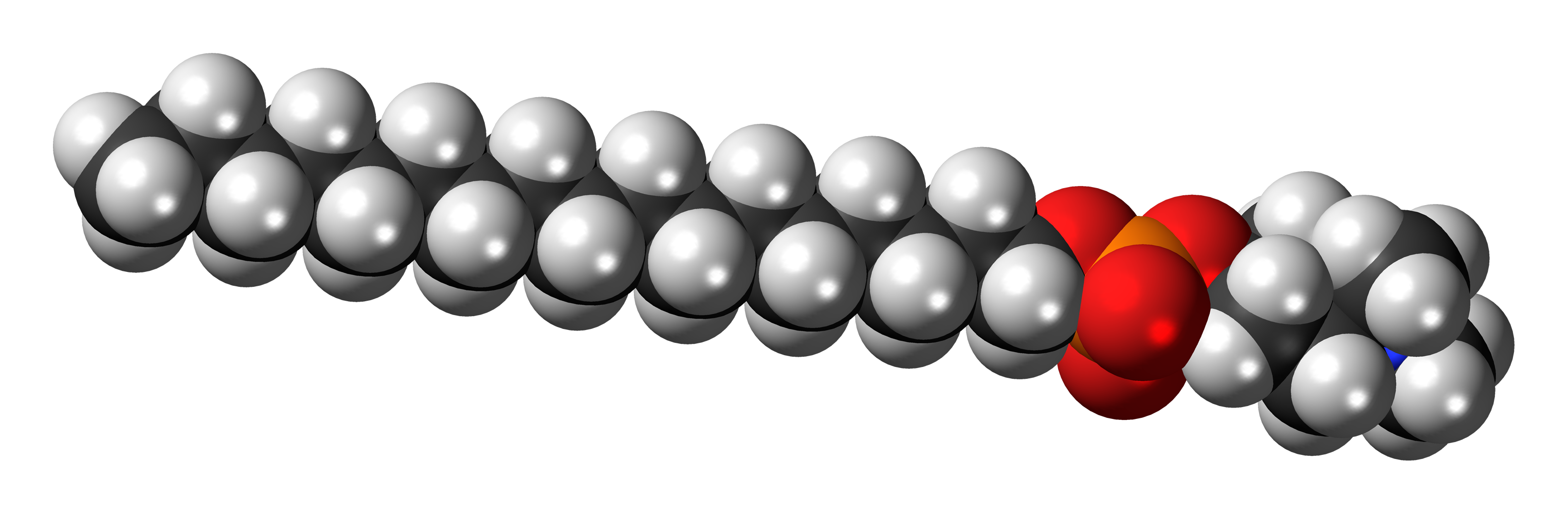

Names
- IUPAC name 1,1-Dimethylpiperidinium-4-yl octadecyl phosphate
- Other names D 21266; KRX 0401

Identifiers
CAS Number	157716-52-4
3D model (JSmol)	Interactive image
ChEMBL	ChEMBL372764
ChemSpider	130628
ECHA InfoCard	100.217.789
IUPHAR/BPS	7424
PubChem CID	148177
UNII	2GWV496552
CompTox Dashboard (EPA)	DTXSID3048946
- InChI: InChI=1S/C25H52NO4P/c1-4-5-6-7-8-9-10-11-12-13-14-15-16-17-18-19-24-29-31(27,28)30-25-20-22-26(2,3)23-21-25/h25H,4-24H2,1-3H3
- SMILES: [O-]P(=O)(OCCCCCCCCCCCCCCCCCC)OC1CC[N+](C)(C)CC1

Properties
Chemical formula	C_{25}H_{52}NO_{4}P
Molar mass	461.668 g·mol^{−1}
- Except where otherwise noted, data are given for materials in their standard state (at 25 °C [77 °F], 100 kPa). Infobox references

Perifosine (also KRX-0401) is a former drug candidate that was under development for a variety of cancer indications. It is an alkyl-phospholipid structurally related to miltefosine. Perifosine interrupts the PI3K/AKT/mTOR pathway by acting as an allosteric AKT inhibitor targeting the pleckstrin homology domain of AKT. It was being developed by Keryx Biopharmaceuticals who had licensed it from Æterna Zentaris Inc.

In 2010, perifosine received orphan drug status in the U.S. for the treatment of multiple myeloma and neuroblastoma, and for multiple myeloma in the EU. However, both were later withdrawn.

In 2011 it was in a phase III trial for colorectal cancer, and another for multiple myeloma. On April 2, 2012, it was announced that perifosine failed its phase III clinical trial for treatment of colon cancer. Detailed results were released in June 2012. On March 11, 2013, Aeterna Zentaris announced the discontinuing of Phase 3 clinical trial of perifosine for the treatment of relapsed and refractory multiple myeloma.
