= Lysophosphatidylcholine =

Class of compounds

General chemical structure of lysophosphatidylcholines, where R is a variable fatty acid chain

Lysophosphatidylcholines (LPC, lysoPC), also called lysolecithins, are a class of chemical compounds which are derived from phosphatidylcholines.

== Overview ==
Lysophosphatidylcholines are produced within cells mainly by the enzyme phospholipase A2, which removes one of the fatty acid groups from phosphatidylcholine to produce LPC. Among other properties, they activate endothelial cells during early atherosclerosis. LPC also acts as a find-me signal, released by apoptotic cells to recruit phagocytes, which then phagocytose the apoptotic cells. Moreover, LPCs can be used in the lab to cause demyelination of brain slices and to mimic the effects of demyelinating diseases such as multiple sclerosis. LPCs are also known to stimulate phagocytosis of the myelin sheath and can change the surface properties of erythrocytes. LPC-induced demyelination is thought to occur through the actions of recruited macrophages and microglia which phagocytose nearby myelin. Invading T cells are also thought to mediate this process. Bacteria such as Legionella pneumophila utilize phospholipase A2 end-products (fatty acids and lysophospholipids) to cause host cell (macrophage) apoptosis through cytochrome C release.

LPCs are present as minor phospholipids in the cell membrane (≤ 3%) and in the blood plasma (8–12%). Since LPCs are quickly metabolized by lysophospholipase and LPC-acyltransferase, they last only briefly in vivo. By replacing the acyl-group within the LPC with an alkyl-group, alkyl-lysophospholipids (ALP) were synthesized. These LPC analogues are metabolically stable, and several ALPs such as edelfosine, miltefosine and perifosine are under research and development as drugs against cancer and other diseases. Lysophosphatidylcholine processing has been discovered to be an essential component of normal human brain development: those born with genes that prevent adequate uptake suffer from lethal microcephaly. MFSD2a has been shown to transport LPC-bound polyunsaturated fatty acids, including DHA and EPA, across the blood-brain and blood-retinal barriers.

LPCs occur in many foods naturally. According to the third edition of Starch: Chemistry and Technology, lysophosphatidylcholine makes up about 70% of the lipids in oat starch (p.592).

Also, the anti-cancer abilities of synthetic LPC variants are special since they do not target the cell DNA but rather insert into the plasma membrane, causing apoptosis through the influencing of several signal pathways. Therefore, their effects are independent of the proliferation state of the tumor cell.

== Industrial applications of PLA2 ==
FoodPro LysoMaxa Oil is an FDA approved commercialized PLA2 enzyme preparation utilized for the degumming of vegetable oils in large-scale productions to increase yield. Variants of lysophosphatidylcholine are the main products of this enzyme.

== Applications ==
Lysophosphatidylcholine has been studied as an immune activator for differentiating monocytes to mature dendritic cells. Lysophosphatidylcholine present in blood amplifies microbial TLR ligands-induced inflammatory responses from human cells like intestinal epithelial cells and macrophages/monocytes. This has an implication in sepsis induced by microbes.

== Occurrence in foods ==
Lysophosphatidylcholine accounts for 4.6% of phospholipids found in coconut oil, which make up 0.2% of lipids in coconut oil. In contrast, vegetable oils contain about 2-3% phospholipids.

== Production in atherosclerosis ==
Intima-media thickness, which is positively correlated with reduced blood flow, was studied in young smokers. Evidence pointed towards smoking as a major risk factor for increased levels of PLA2, due to tobacco smoke's impact on oxidation of retained LDL particles in the intima of a carotid artery, which may have a detrimental impact on overall health.

== See also ==
- 1-Lysophosphatidylcholine
