= Pancreatic lipase family =

Protein family found in humans

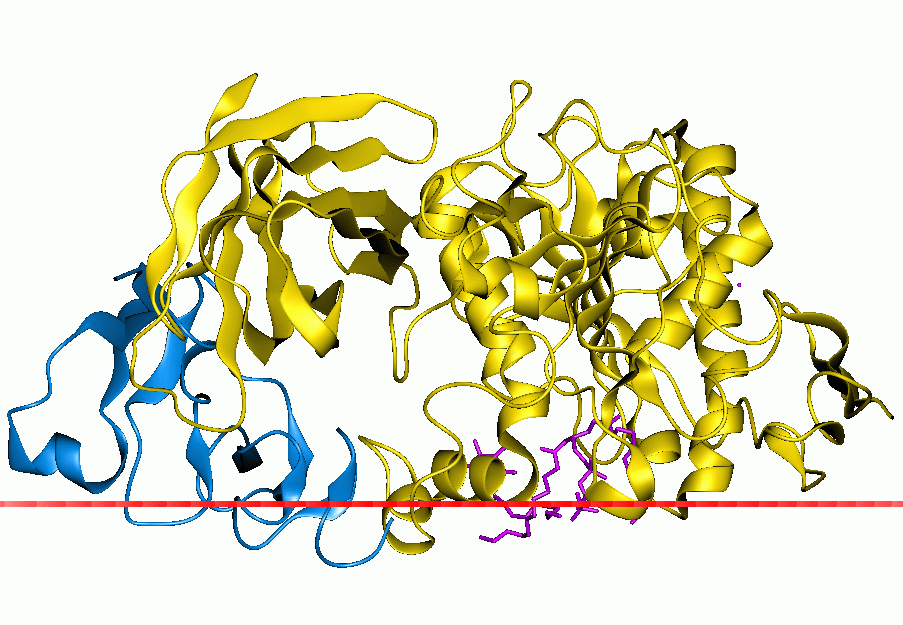
- Complex of human pancreatic lipase with colipase

Identifiers
- Symbol: Lipase
- Pfam: PF00151
- InterPro: IPR013818
- PROSITE: PDOC00110
- SCOP2: 1lpa / SCOPe / SUPFAM
- OPM superfamily: 127
- OPM protein: 1lpa
Available protein structures:
- PDB: IPR013818 PF00151 (ECOD; PDBsum)
- AlphaFold: IPR013818; PF00151

The Pancreatic lipase family is a family of proteins which includes pancreatic lipase (PNLIP) and a number of similar lipases. Lipases are enzymes that break the ester bonds linking fatty acids to fat molecules, especially triglycerides. In humans and other animals, the lipases in this family fill a wide range of roles from digesting dietary fat to regulating lipid levels in blood.

The pancreatic lipase family is one of the best understood lipase families. It contains the traditional lipases (EC 3.1.1.3): pancreatic lipase (PNLIP), hepatic lipase (LIPC), endothelial lipase (LIPG), and PNLIPRP2, but also some non-traditional lipases like lipoprotein lipase (LPL, EC 3.1.1.34) and even the phospholipase: phosphatidylserine phospholipase A1 (PLA1A, EC 3.1.1.111). It also contains some related proteins like PNLIPRP1 which seem to have lost their ability to function as enzymes in humans.

This family is part of the larger α/β hydrolase superfamily of proteins, and so its members possess α/β hydrolase domains. For example, Pancreatic lipase contains two protein domains. The one toward the N terminus is the α/β hydrolase, whereas the one toward the C terminus plays a role in binding to colipase, a protein needed in order for the lipase to become activated. The related lipases gastric lipase/lingual lipase (LIPF), lysosomal lipase (LIPA), and carboxyl ester lipase (CEL) are part of the larger α/β hydrolase superfamily but not considered part of the pancreatic lipase family.

The most conserved region in all these proteins is centred on a serine residue which has been shown to participate, with a histidine and an aspartic acid residue, in a charge relay system. Such a region is also present in lipases of prokaryotic origin and in lecithin-cholesterol acyltransferase (EC 2.3.1.43) (LCAT), which catalyzes fatty acid transfer between phosphatidylcholine and cholesterol.

== In humans ==
=== Family members ===
- Pancreatic lipase (PNLIP): the namesake member, which is also known as pancreatic triacylglycerol lipase or steapsin. This pancreas enzyme is one of the primary digestive enzymes involved in breaking down dietary fats.
- Hepatic lipase (LIPC)
- Endothelial lipase (LIPG)
- Lipase member H (LIPH)
- Lipase member I (LIPI)
- Lipoprotein lipase (LPL)
- Phospholipase A1 member A (PLA1A)
- Pancreatic lipase related protein 1 (PNLIPRP1)
- Pancreatic lipase related protein 2 (PNLIPRP2)
- Pancreatic lipase related protein 3 (PNLIPRP3)

=== Diagnostic importance ===
Pancreatic lipase is secreted into the duodenum through the duct system of the pancreas. Its concentration in serum is normally very low. Under extreme disruption of pancreatic function, such as pancreatitis or pancreatic adenocarcinoma, the pancreas may begin to autolyse and release pancreatic enzymes including pancreatic lipase into serum. Thus, through measurement of serum concentration of pancreatic lipase, acute pancreatitis can be diagnosed.

=== Inhibitors ===
Lipase inhibitors such as orlistat can be used as a treatment for obesity.

One peptide selected by phage display was found to inhibit pancreatic lipase.

== See also ==
- Orlistat (a pancreatic lipase inhibitor marketed as an anti-obesity medication)
