= Lipase =

Class of enzymes which cleave fats via hydrolysis

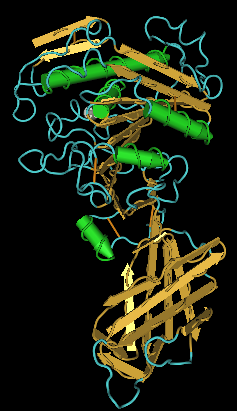
- A computer-generated image of a type of pancreatic lipase (PLRP2) from the guinea pig. PDB: 1GPL
- Pronunciation: /ˈlaɪpeɪs, ˈlaɪpeɪz/ LY-payss, LY-payz
- Test of: Pancreatitis
Conversion calculator
SI (µkat/L)	Conventional (U/L)

Lipases are a type of enzyme that break down fats. More specifically, lipases use water (as hydrolases) to remove fatty acids from fat molecules, especially triglycerides or its derivatives. In humans and other animals, lipases have a variety of roles in the body, from helping digest dietary fats like pancreatic lipase, to synthesizing fat-based hormones like diglyceride lipases.

What counts as a lipase is not consistently defined across sources, and some only consider enzymes to be lipases if they are activated by oil-water interfaces.

Many specific lipases can also catalyze other reactions. For example, carboxyl ester lipase is able to remove fatty acids that are attached to cholesterol, while endothelial lipase can remove fatty acids from phospholipids (a major component of cell membranes).

== Structure and catalytic mechanism ==
Classically, lipases catalyse the hydrolysis of triglycerides:
$$\begin{align}
\text{triglyceride}  +  \ce{H2O}  &\longrightarrow  \text{fatty acid} + \text{diacylglycerol} \\[4pt]
\text{diacylglycerol} + \ce{H2O}  &\longrightarrow  \text{fatty acid}  +  \text{monacylglycerol} \\[4pt]
\text{monacylglycerol} +  \ce{H2O}  &\longrightarrow  \text{fatty acid}  +  \text{glycerol}
\end{align}$$

Lipases are serine hydrolases, i.e. they function by transesterification generating an acyl serine intermediate. Most lipases act at a specific position on the glycerol backbone of a lipid substrate (A1, A2 or A3). For example, human pancreatic lipase (HPL), converts triglyceride substrates found in ingested oils to monoglycerides and two fatty acids.

A diverse array of genetically distinct lipase enzymes are found in nature, and they represent several types of protein folds and catalytic mechanisms. However, most are built on an alpha/beta hydrolase fold and employ a chymotrypsin-like hydrolysis mechanism using a catalytic triad consisting of a serine nucleophile, a histidine base, and an acid residue, usually aspartic acid.

== Physiological distribution ==
Lipases are involved in diverse biological processes which range from routine metabolism of dietary triglycerides to cell signaling and inflammation. Thus, some lipase activities are confined to specific compartments within cells while others work in extracellular spaces.

- In the example of lysosomal lipase, the enzyme is confined within an organelle called the lysosome.
- Other lipase enzymes, such as pancreatic lipases, are secreted into extracellular spaces where they serve to process dietary lipids into more simple forms that can be more easily absorbed and transported throughout the body.
- Fungi and bacteria may secrete lipases to facilitate nutrient absorption from the external medium (or in examples of pathogenic microbes, to promote invasion of a new host).
- Certain wasp and bee venoms contain phospholipases that enhance the effects of injury and inflammation delivered by a sting.
- As biological membranes are integral to living cells and are largely composed of phospholipids, lipases play important roles in cell biology.
- Malassezia globosa, a fungus thought to be the cause of human dandruff, uses lipase to break down sebum into oleic acid and increase skin cell production, causing dandruff.

Genes encoding lipases are even present in certain viruses.

Some lipases are expressed and secreted by pathogenic organisms during an infection. In particular, Candida albicans has many lipases, possibly reflecting broad-lipolytic activity, which may contribute to the persistence and virulence of C. albicans in human tissue.

=== Human lipases ===
Name	Gene	Location	Description	Mutation-caused Disorder(s)
gastric lipase	LIPF	gastric juice	Digestive enzyme produced in the stomach. Functions in the infant at a near-neutral pH to aid in the digestion of lipids	–
pancreatic lipase	PNLIP	pancreatic juice	Digestive enzyme which is the main enzyme that breaks down triglycerides and diglycerides in the human digestive system, mainly producing monoglycerides and free fatty acids. Requires the protein colipase for optimal efficiency.	Pancreatic lipase deficiency (PNLIPD)
bile salt-dependent lipase	CEL or "BSDL"	pancreatic juice, breast milk	Digestive enzyme with a broader range of target molecules compared to PNLIP. It's the main enzyme that breaks down cholesterol esters and is also responsible for up to 40% of the break down of monoglycerides.	Maturity-onset diabetes of the young, type 8 (MODY8)
lysosomal lipase	LIPA	interior space of organelle: lysosome	Also referred to as lysosomal acid lipase (LAL or LIPA) or acid cholesteryl ester hydrolase	Cholesteryl ester storage disease (CESD) and Wolman disease
hepatic lipase	LIPC	endothelium	Hepatic lipase acts on the remaining lipids carried on lipoproteins in the blood to regenerate LDL (low density lipoprotein).	Hepatic lipase deficiency
lipoprotein lipase	LPL or "LIPD"	endothelium	Lipoprotein lipase functions in the blood to act on triacylglycerides carried on VLDL (very low density lipoprotein) so that cells can take up the freed fatty acids.	Lipoprotein lipase deficiency
endothelial lipase	LIPG	endothelium	Functions more strongly as a phospholipase than a triglyceride lipase. Preferentially breaks down High Density Lipoproteins (HDL) compared to other lipoproteins.	–
adipose triglyceride lipase	PNPLA2	intracellular	Breaks down triglycerides in adipocytes, initializing first step of lipolysis.	Neutral lipid storage disease
hormone-sensitive lipase	LIPE	intracellular	Preferentially breaks down diglycerides. Functions to extract free fatty acids from stored fats in adipocytes. Also involved in the production of steroid hormones by converting cholesterol esters to free cholesterol.	Lipodystrophy
pancreatic lipase related protein 2	PNLIPRP2 or "PLRP2"	pancreatic juice	Can function as both a lipase and a galactolipase, but gene is frequently broken in certain ethnicities (30-50% of alleles).	–

Other traditional triglyceride lipases (EC 3.1.1.3) include Lipase member N, DDHD2, PNLIPRP3, PNPLA4, and PNPLA5. In addition, there are various other non-traditional lipases including Monoacylglycerol lipases (eg: MGLL, ABHD2, and ABHD6), and Diacylglycerol lipases (eg: DAGLA, DAGLB, and ABHD11).

Not all lipase-family proteins function as lipases in humans. Some like Lipase member H and Lipase member I function as phospholipases, while others like pancreatic lipase related protein 1 (PNLIPRP1), LIPJ, LIPK, and LIPM do not (yet) have a well established function as an enzyme.

== Uses ==
In the commercial sphere, lipases are widely used in laundry detergents. Several thousand tons per year are produced for this role.

Lipases are catalysts for hydrolysis of esters and are useful outside of the cell, a testament to their wide substrate scope and ruggedness. The ester hydrolysis activity of lipases has been well evaluated for the conversion of triglycerides into biofuels or their precursors.

Lipases are chiral, which means that they can be used for the enantioselective hydrolysis of prochiral diesters. Several procedures have been reported for applications in the synthesis of fine chemicals.

Lipases are generally animal sourced, but can also be sourced microbially.

=== Biomedicine ===
Blood tests for lipase may be used to help investigate and diagnose acute pancreatitis and other disorders of the pancreas. Measured serum lipase values may vary depending on the method of analysis.

In patients with exocrine pancreatic insufficiency, pancreatic enzyme replacement therapy (PERT) is used to replace the various enzymes that are produced by the pancreas the supplementation of pancreatic enzymes to treat. Enzyme mixtures used for PERT will include lipase, amylase, and protease.

== See also ==
- Alpha toxin
- Lysosomal acid lipase deficiency
- Outer membrane phospholipase A1
- Patatin-like phospholipase
- Pathology
- Peripheral membrane proteins
- Phospholipase A
- Phospholipase A2
- Phospholipase C
- Triglyceride lipase
