= Angiopoietin-like proteins =

Family of proteins

The Angiopoietin-like proteins are proteins structurally like the angiopoietins but which do not bind to the angiopoietin receptors.

Also known as the Angiopoietin-related proteins.

== Members ==
- Angiopoietin-related protein 1, gene ANGPTL1
- Angiopoietin-related protein 2, gene ANGPTL2
- Angiopoietin-related protein 3, gene ANGPTL3
- Angiopoietin-related protein 4, gene ANGPTL4
- Angiopoietin-related protein 5, gene ANGPTL5, mainly expressed in adult human heart.
- Angiopoietin-related protein 6, gene ANGPTL6, associations with components of metabolic syndrome.
- Angiopoietin-related protein 7, gene ANGPTL7
- Angiopoietin-related protein 8, gene ANGPTL8, also known as lipasin because of its capacity in LPL inhibition.
