= ANGPTL8 =

Mammalian protein found in Homo sapiens

Identifiers
- Aliases: ANGPTL8, PRO1185, PVPA599, RIFL, TD26, C19orf80, Betatrophin, angiopoietin like 8
- External IDs: OMIM: 616223; MGI: 3643534; GeneCards: ANGPTL8

Gene location (Human)
Chr.	Chromosome 19 (human)
Band	19p13.2	Start	11,237,450 bp
Band	19p13.2	End	11,241,943 bp

Gene location (Mouse)
Chr.	Chromosome 9 (mouse)
Band	9|9 A3	Start	21,746,806 bp
Band	9|9 A3	End	21,748,643 bp
RNA expression pattern
Bgee	Human / Mouse (ortholog); Top expressed in: right lobe of liver; gonad; subcutaneous adipose tissue; apex of heart; left coronary artery; epithelium of colon; muscle layer of sigmoid colon; tibial nerve; right adrenal cortex; right auricle of heart / Top expressed in: left lobe of liver; tunica adventitia of aorta; white adipose tissue; tunica media of zone of aorta; brown adipose tissue; subcutaneous adipose tissue; right kidney; embryo; yolk sac; tail of embryo; More reference expression data
BioGPS	n/a
Gene ontology
Molecular function	protein binding; hormone activity
Cellular component	extracellular region
Biological process	regulation of lipid metabolic process; cell maturation; cellular lipid metabolic process; fat cell differentiation; positive regulation of protein processing; triglyceride homeostasis; lipid metabolism; regulation of lipoprotein metabolic process; regulation of lipoprotein lipase activity; type B pancreatic cell proliferation; regulation of signaling receptor activity; signal transduction
Sources:Amigo / QuickGO
Orthologs
Databases	NCBI: entry; OMA: entry
Species	Human	Mouse
Entrez	55908	624219
Ensembl	ENSG00000130173	ENSMUSG00000047822
UniProt	Q6UXH0	Q8R1L8
RefSeq (mRNA)	NM_018687	NM_001080940
RefSeq (protein)	NP_061157	NP_001074409
Location (UCSC)	Chr 19: 11.24 – 11.24 Mb	Chr 9: 21.75 – 21.75 Mb
PubMed search
- Wikidata
View/Edit Human	View/Edit Mouse

ANGPTL8 (also known as lipasin, previously betatrophin) is a protein that in humans is encoded by the C19orf80 gene.

== Gene ==
The ANGPTL8 gene lies on mouse chromosome 9 (gene symbol: Gm6484) and on human chromosome 19 (gene symbol: C19orf80).

== Discovery ==
The ANGPTL8 gene was discovered in 2012 as Lipasin, RIFL, and ANGPTL8. In 2013 it was suggested by Melton and Yi from Harvard that ANGPTL8 promotes mouse pancreatic islet cell proliferation. These results led the authors to propose an alternative name for ANGPTL8, betatrophin. However, the link between ANGPTL8 and islet proliferation was quickly proven false by other researchers. In fact, in December 2016 the original paper by Melton and Yi was retracted, putting the link between ANGPTL8 and islets cells to rest. Nevertheless, the name betatrophin continues to be used. Given the homology of ANGPTL8 with ANGPTL4 and ANGPTL3, and considering that ANGPTL8 does not promote beta cell proliferation, the name betatrophin should be abandoned in favor of ANGPTL8.

== Function ==
The encoded 22 kDa protein contains an N-terminal secretion signal and two coiled-coil domains and is a member of the angiopoietin-like (ANGPTL) protein family. However, in contrast to other ANGPTL proteins, ANGPTL8 lacks the C-terminal fibrinogen-like domain, and therefore it is an atypical member of the ANGPTL family. ANGPTL8 has been shown to form complexes with ANGPTL3 with an apparent stoichiometry of 3:1 of ANGPTL3 to ANGPTL8 respectively. Formation of these complexes appears to require intracellular co-folding as mixing of ANGPTL8 and ANGPTL3 extracellularly does not result in complex formation. ANGPTL8 is expressed in the hepatic tissue and secreted into circulation, in order for the efficient secretion of ANGPTL8 it must form a complex with ANGPTL3. ANGPTL8 alone shows little inhibitory capacity and must form a complex with ANGPTL3 to inhibit the enzyme Lipoprotein lipase (LPL) and has been shown to greatly promote the ability of ANGPTL3 to inhibit LPL. In mice ANGPTL8 is secreted by the liver and by adipose tissue, hepatic overexpression of ANGPTL8 causes elevation of circulating Triglyceride levels.

Despite having elevated post-heparin plasma LPL activity, mice lacking ANGPTL8 exhibit markedly decreased uptake of Very low-density lipoprotein-derived fatty acids into white adipose tissue (WAT). The defect in fatty acids uptake by WAT in ANGPTL8-null mice is likely due to the enhanced fatty acid uptake by the heart and skeletal muscle, because of the elevated LPL activity in these two tissues, as suggested by the ANGPTL3-4-8 model. Sustained ANGPTL3/8 activity, as seen in APOA5 deficiency, leads to reduced LPL abundance and activity in the heart arterial endothelium.

ANGPTL8 was proposed to increase the rate at which beta-cells undergo cell division. Injection of mice with ANGPTL8 cDNA lowered blood sugar (i.e. hypoglycemia), presumably due to action at the pancreas. However, treatment of human islets with ANGPTL8 is unable to increase beta-cell division. Furthermore, studies in ANGPTL8 knock-out mice do not support a role of ANGPTL8 in controlling beta cell growth, yet point to a clear role in regulating plasma triglyceride levels. Based on these studies, it is fairly safe to say that the notion that ANGPTL8 promotes beta cell expansion is dead, which was made official by the retraction of the original paper. Deletion of ANGPTL8 does not seem to impact glucose and insulin tolerance in mice.

== Structure ==
Three dimensional structure of none of the members of Angiopoietin like proteins (ANGPTLs) is available up until now. However, the structure of ANGPTL8 was predicted by homology modeling and is also reported in literature. It consists of alpha helices and its sequence show high similarity with the coiled-coil domains of ANGPTL3 and ANGPTL4.

== Pathway ==
The ANGPTL8 regulatory pathway has been constructed recently by integrating the information of its known transcription factors which is available at WikiPathways data repository with the pathway id WP3915.

== Clinical significance ==
It was hoped that ANGPTL8 or its homolog in humans may provide an effective treatment for type 2 diabetes and perhaps even type I diabetes. Unfortunately, since new data have greatly called into question the ability of ANGPTL8 to increase beta-cell replication, its potential use as a therapy for type 2 diabetes is limited. Inhibition of ANGPTL8 represents a possible therapeutic strategy for hypertriglyceridemia. In a clinical trial, a human ANGPTL3/8 monoclonal antibody reduced the concentration of triglycerides (-70%), and low-density lipoprotein cholesterol (-32%), while increasing HDL- cholesterol (+27%), representing a promising therapy for multiple lipid disorders.
