= PNLIPRP1 =

Identifiers
- Aliases: PNLIPRP1, PLRP1, pancreatic lipase related protein 1
- External IDs: OMIM: 604422; MGI: 97723; GeneCards: PNLIPRP1
Available structures
PDB	Ortholog search: PDBe RCSB
PDB	List of PDB id codes 2PPL

Gene location (Human)
Chr.	Chromosome 10 (human)
Band	10q25.3	Start	116,590,385 bp
Band	10q25.3	End	116,609,175 bp

Gene location (Mouse)
Chr.	Chromosome 19 (mouse)
Band	19 D2|19 54.49 cM	Start	58,717,319 bp
Band	19 D2|19 54.49 cM	End	58,732,601 bp
RNA expression pattern
Bgee	Human / Mouse (ortholog); Top expressed in: body of pancreas; islet of Langerhans; pancreatic epithelial cell; testicle; buccal mucosa cell; gonad; right coronary artery; ectocervix; rectum; right lobe of liver / Top expressed in: lacrimal gland; pyloric antrum; pancreas; parotid gland; islet of Langerhans; migratory enteric neural crest cell; epithelium of stomach; duodenum; sexually immature organism; mucous cell of stomach; More reference expression data
BioGPS	n/a
Gene ontology
Molecular function	calcium ion binding; triglyceride lipase activity; carboxylic ester hydrolase activity; metal ion binding; lipase activity
Cellular component	extracellular region; extracellular space
Biological process	lipid metabolism
Sources:Amigo / QuickGO
Orthologs
Databases	NCBI: entry; OMA: entry
Species	Human	Mouse
Entrez	5407	18946
Ensembl	ENSG00000187021	ENSMUSG00000042179
UniProt	P54315	Q5BKQ4
RefSeq (mRNA)	NM_001303135; NM_006229	NM_018874
RefSeq (protein)	NP_001290064; NP_006220	NP_061362
Location (UCSC)	Chr 10: 116.59 – 116.61 Mb	Chr 19: 58.72 – 58.73 Mb
PubMed search
- Wikidata
View/Edit Human	View/Edit Mouse

Pancreatic lipase-related protein 1 (or PLRP1) is a protein that in humans is encoded by the PNLIPRP1 gene. This pancreas protein was originally thought to function as a lipase (a type of enzyme that breaks down fats), but, unlike other members of the pancreatic lipase family, this was found to not be the case.

While the function of PLRP1 is still poorly understood, it is secreted into pancreatic juice (by acinar cells) and has been found to bind to the protein colipase. Since the primary digestive lipase, pancreatic lipase, also needs bind to colipase to function, it has been suggested that this protein may function to inhibit pancreatic lipase activity. Notably, the PNLIPRP1 gene has been found to be more often nonfunctional (unlike in humans) in herbivores than carnivores, suggesting a digestive role whose value depends on diet.

== See also ==
- PNLIPRP2
- Acinar cell
