= Festal =

Festal is a brand name drug containing pancreatin, hemicellulase, and certain bile components. It is indicated for use in people with gastrointestinal problems, in order to help actively digest food (especially fatty meals that require pancreatic enzymes).

== Links ==
- Morozov, K. A; Valenkevich, L. N (1974). "Therapeutic effectiveness of mexaform, mexase and festal in chronic enterocolitis". Vrachebnoe Delo. 5: 97–100. PMID 4276279.
