= Fibrosing colonopathy =

- Other names: Abdominal pain, abdominal swelling, vomiting, constipation
- Causes: High doses of pancreatic enzyme supplements
- Risk factors: Young age, prior surgery of the intestines, certain medications including corticosteroids and H2 blockers
- Frequency: >60 cases reported

Fibrosing colonopathy is a disease that arises in people with cystic fibrosis treated with high doses of pancreatic enzyme supplements. Symptoms are non-specific with abdominal pain, abdominal swelling, vomiting, and constipation.

Risk factors include being young, prior surgery of the intestines, and the use of certain medications including corticosteroids and H2 blockers. It may appear similar to distal intestinal obstruction syndrome or inflammatory colitis such as Crohn's disease.

A maximum dose of 10,000 IU of lipase per kilogram per day is recommended for pancreatic enzyme supplementation to prevent this condition. More than 60 cases have been described as of 1999. The disease was suggested to be caused by methacrylic acid copolymer which is used as coating for delayed release of enzymes but there is no reliable evidence for that.

== Signs and symptoms ==
Clinical symptoms of fibrosing colonopathy can be similar to those of intestinal obstruction and include constipation or diarrhea, abdominal pain, hematochezia, vomiting, nausea, and poor weight gain.

== Causes ==
The precise etiopathogenesis is still unknown. Young age (2–13 years), gastrointestinal history (DIOS, meconium ileus), abdominal surgery in the past, HDPE, and use of histamine H2-receptor blockers, corticosteroids, or recombinant human deoxyribonuclease (DNase) are risk factors. Fibrosing colonopathy and cystic fibrosis have a strong correlation.

== Diagnosis ==
The afflicted colon's histologic findings include thickening of the muscularis propria, submucosal fibrosis, a cobblestone-like appearance, and persistent mucosal inflammation. With relative rectal sparing, imaging can demonstrate diffuse narrowing, shortening, and loss of haustration of the colonic lumen.

== See also ==
- Cystic fibrosis
- Pancreatic enzymes (medication)
