= LIPH =

LIPH may refer to:

- LIPH (gene), an enzyme that in humans is encoded by the LIPH gene
- LIPH, the ICAO code for Treviso Airport, Italy
