= Exocrine pancreatic insufficiency =

Inability to properly digest food due to a lack of digestive enzymes from the pancreas

- Other names: pancreatic exocrine insufficiency, PEI
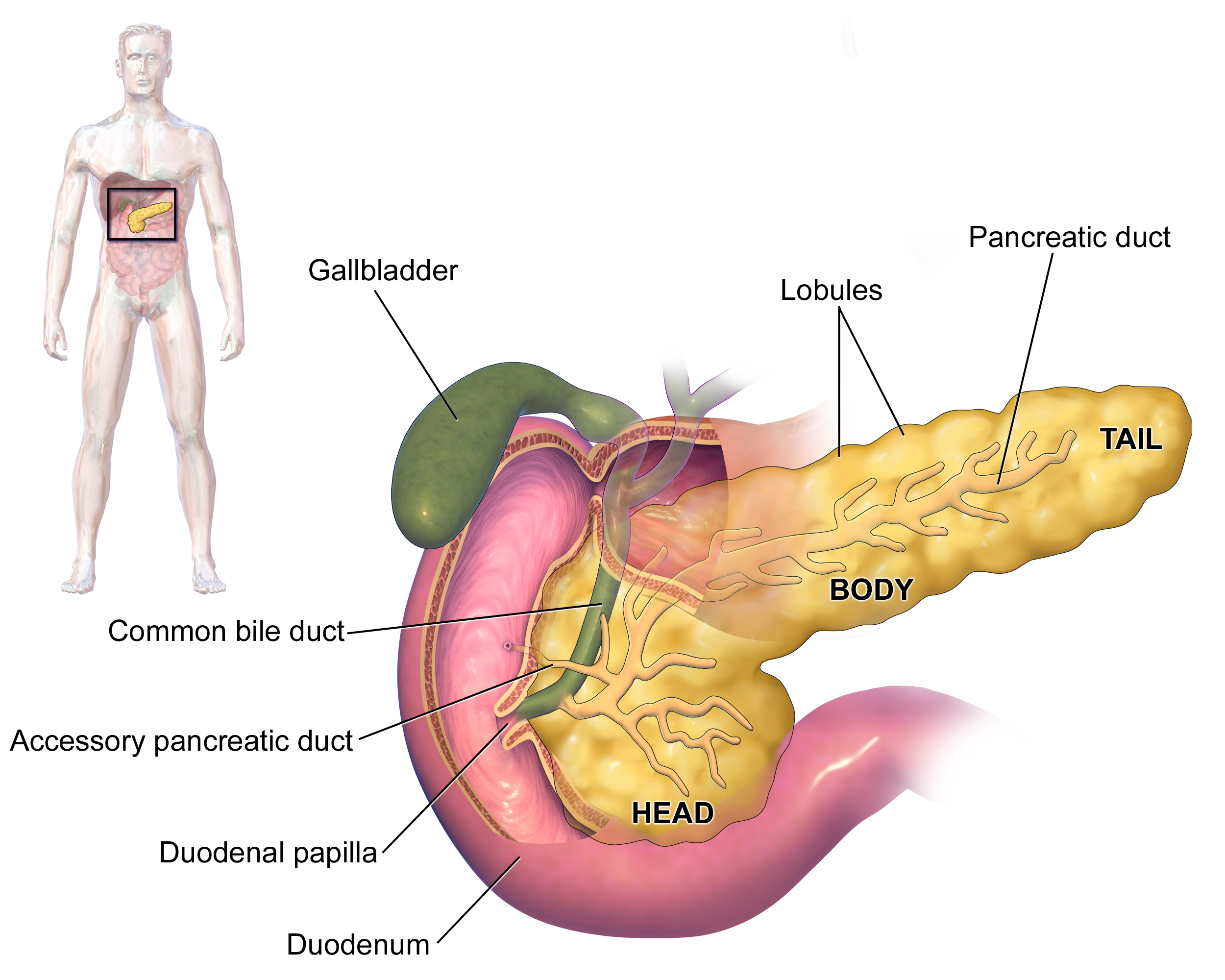
- Anatomy of the pancreas
- Specialty: Endocrinology, gastroenterology
- Causes: Type 2 diabetes, type 1 diabetes, pancreatitis, celiac disease, cystic fibrosis, IBS-D, IBD, somatostatin analogues
- Risk factors: older age, tobacco use, alcohol use
- Diagnostic method: Fecal elastase test
- Treatment: pancreatic enzyme replacement therapy (PERT)
- Medication: pancrelipase

Exocrine pancreatic insufficiency (EPI) is the inability to properly digest food due to a lack or reduction of digestive enzymes made by the pancreas. EPI can occur in humans and is prevalent in many conditions such as cystic fibrosis, Shwachman–Diamond syndrome, different types of pancreatitis, multiple types of diabetes mellitus (Type 1 and Type 2 diabetes), advanced renal disease, older adults, celiac disease, diarrhea-predominant irritable bowel syndrome (IBS-D), inflammatory bowel disease (IBD), HIV, alcohol-related liver disease, Sjogren syndrome, tobacco use, and use of somatostatin analogues.

EPI is caused by a progressive loss of the pancreatic cells that make digestive enzymes (acinar cells). Loss of digestive enzymes leads to maldigestion and malabsorption of nutrients from normal digestive processes. EPI can cause symptoms even before reaching the stages of malnutrition: 'mild' or 'moderate' EPI is when fecal elastase levels are <200 ug/g, whereas 'severe' EPI is considered to be when fecal elastase levels is <100 ug/g.

The exocrine pancreas is a portion of this organ that contains clusters of ducts (acini) producing bicarbonate anion, a mild alkali, as well as an array of digestive enzymes that together empty by way of the interlobular and main pancreatic ducts into the duodenum (upper small intestine). The hormones cholecystokinin and secretin secreted by the stomach and duodenum in response to distension and the presence of food in turn stimulate the production of digestive enzymes by the exocrine pancreas. The alkalization of the duodenum neutralizes the acidic chyme produced by the stomach that is passing into it; the digestive enzymes serve to catalyze the breakdown of complex foodstuffs into smaller molecules for absorption and integration into metabolic pathways. The enzymes include proteases (trypsinogen and chymotrypsinogen), hydrolytic enzymes that cleave lipids (the lipases phospholipase A2 and lysophospholipase, and cholesterol esterase), and amylase to digest starches. EPI results from progressive failure in the exocrine function of the pancreas to provide its digestive enzymes, often in response to chronic pancreatitis, a genetic condition or other disease state, resulting in the inability of the animal involved to properly digest food.

== Signs and symptoms ==
Loss of pancreatic enzymes leads to maldigestion and malabsorption. Symptoms may include:

- Abdominal discomfort or pain
- Abnormal stool frequency (increase)
- Ataxia (vitamin E deficiency)
- Bloating
- Diarrhea
- Anemia (vitamin B12, iron, folate deficiency)
- Bleeding disorders (vitamin K malabsorption)
- Ecchymoses (a type of bruise, due to vitamin K deficiency)
- Edema (hypoalbuminemia)
- Fatigue
- Flatulence and abdominal distention (bacterial fermentation of unabsorbed food)
- Hypocalcemia (contraction or muscle spasms)
- Metabolic bone disease (vitamin D deficiency)
- Muscle atrophy
- Night blindness (vitamin A deficiency)
- Peripheral neuropathy (vitamin E deficiency)
- Steatorrhea
- Voluminous and foul‐smelling stools
- Weight loss
- Xerophthalmia (vitamin A deficiency)

== Causes ==
In humans, the most common causes of EPI are likely related to diabetes (10.5% global prevalence of diabetes, with EPI rates of ranging from 30–50% in Type 1 and 20–30% of Type 2) and IBS-D (7.6–10.8% global prevalence of IBS-D, with EPI rates around 5–6%). Other causes of EPI include acute or chronic pancreatitis and cystic fibrosis, Crohn's disease, ulcerative colitis, celiac, advanced renal disease, older age, IBD, HIV, alcohol-related liver disease, Sjogren's syndrome, tobacco use, and use of somatostatin analogues.

EPI can also occur in 10–20% of the general population.

== Diagnosis ==
The three main tests used in considering a diagnosis of EPI are: fecal elastase test, fecal fat test, and a direct pancreatic function test. The latter is a less used test that assesses exocrine function in the pancreas by inserting a tube into the small intestine to collect pancreatic secretions.

The fecal elastase test is a less cumbersome test that has replaced the 72-hour fecal fat test; in the fecal elastase test, pancreatic enzyme replacement therapy (enzyme supplementation, the treatment for EPI) does not have to be stopped for or during fecal elastase testing.

Lundh's test is an older test that involves placing a tube with multiple channels in to the duodenum. This tube has holes in the stomach and in the duodenum. A meal consisting of proteins, carbohydrates and fats is injected into the stomach. Typically a prokinetic medication such as metoclopramide is administered to accelerate passage of the food into the duodenum. A sample of the duodenal juice is taken at the 30 minute mark, and then every 30 minutes until the two hour mark. The activity of trypsin is measured and averaged among the 4 collections. A positive test is defined by low trypsin activity on the average of the samples, and is suggestive of decreased exocrine function of the pancreas.

=== Differential diagnosis ===
Symptoms are initially non-specific and overlap with other gastrointestinal conditions. Patient history and a comprehensive overview of symptoms guide evaluation of other possible conditions:

- Celiac disease
- Giardiasis
- Inflammatory bowel disease
- Irritable bowel syndrome
- Microscopic colitis
- Pancreatic tumor
- Small intestinal bacterial overgrowth
- Zollinger–Ellison syndrome

== Treatment ==
EPI is treated with pancreatic enzyme replacement therapy (PERT) called pancrelipase, which is used to break down fats (via a lipase), proteins (via a protease), and carbohydrates (via amylase) into units that can be digested. Pancrelipase is typically porcine derived in the prescription products although over-the-counter options also exist, including those made with plants and other non-porcine materials. In the US, there are 6 FDA-approved PERT products available on the market as of 2012.

Dosing can vary based on the individual's needs. PERT is considered to be safe, effective, and tolerable for people with EPI regardless of the cause of EPI.In addition, various nutrient deficiencies that can be caused by EPI need to be evaluated, tested, and treated. The impact of nutrient deficiencies on the body's metabolic pathways, muscle tissue, bone density, organs, and overall health can cause a wide range of often misdiagnosed symptoms for those impacted by exocrine pancreatic insufficiency.

Since type 3c diabetes develops very frequently with chronic pancreatitis, screening tests should be done regularly. In the case of previously diagnosed diabetes, reevaluation can inform treatment.

== Other animals ==
EPI also occurs in dogs and other animals. Chronic pancreatitis is the most common cause of EPI in cats. In dogs, pancreatic acinar atrophy is the most common cause in German Shepherds, rough Collies and Eurasiers, whereas chronic pancreatitis is the most common cause in dogs of other breeds.

=== Causes and pathogenesis ===
Pancreatic acinar atrophy and chronic pancreatitis are the most common causes of exocrine pancreatic insufficiency in dogs and cats.In dogs, EPI is most common in young German Shepherds, and in Finland Rough Collies, and is inherited. In German Shepherds, the method of inheritance is through an autosomal recessive gene. In these two breeds, at least, the cause appears to be immune-mediated as a sequela to lymphocytic pancreatitis. The German Shepherd makes up about two-thirds of cases seen with EPI. Other breeds reported to be predisposed to EPI include terrier breeds, Cavalier King Charles Spaniels, Chow Chows, and Picardy Shepherds.

=== Symptoms ===
In animals, signs of EPI are not present until 85 to 90 percent of the pancreas is unable to secrete its enzymes. In dogs, symptoms include weight loss, poor hair coat, flatulence, increased appetite, coprophagia, and diarrhea. Feces are often yellow-gray in color with an oily texture. Many concurrent diseases mimic EPI, and severe pancreatitis is one that, if allowed to continue unabated, can lead to EPI.

=== Diagnosis and treatment ===
The most reliable test for EPI in dogs and cats is serum trypsin-like immunoreactivity (TLI); a low value indicates EPI. Fecal elastase levels may also be used for diagnosis in dogs.

In dogs and cats, the best treatment is to supplement the animals' food with dried pancreatic extracts. Fresh pancreas can be substituted, but there is slight risk of disease transmission. Symptoms usually improve within a few days, but lifelong treatment is required to manage the condition. A rare side-effect of the use of dried pancreatic extracts is oral ulceration and bleeding.

Because of malabsorption, serum levels of cyanocobalamin (vitamin B12) and tocopherol (vitamin E) may be low. These may be supplemented, although since cyanocobalamin contains the toxic chemical cyanide, dogs that have serious cobalamin issues should instead be treated with hydroxocobalamin or methylcobalamin.

Cyanocobalamin deficiency is very common in cats with EPI because about 99 percent of intrinsic factor (which is required for cyanocobalamin absorption from the intestine) is secreted by the pancreas. In dogs, this figure is about 90 percent, and only about 50 percent of dogs have this deficiency.

Cats may suffer from Vitamin K deficiencies. If there is bacterial overgrowth in the intestine, antibiotics should be used, especially if treatment is not working.

For dogs struggling to gain weight or continuing to show symptoms, switching to a low-fiber, highly digestible diet may help. Despite previous belief that low-fat diets are beneficial in dogs with EPI, more recent studies have shown that a high-fat diet may increase nutrient absorption and better manage the disease. However, it has been shown that different dogs respond to different dietary modifications, so the best diet must be determined on a case-by-case basis.

One possible sequela, volvulus (mesenteric torsion), is a rare consequence of EPI in dogs.
