= Phospholipase A1 member A =

Enzyme found in humans

PLA1A

Identifiers
- Aliases: PLA1A, PS-PLA1, PSPLA1, phospholipase A1 member A
- External IDs: OMIM: 607460; MGI: 1934677; GeneCards: PLA1A
Enzyme activity
| EC # | BRENDA | ExPASy | KEGG | MetaCyc |
|---|---|---|---|---|
| 3.1.1.111 | ↗ | ↗ | ↗ | ↗ |

Gene location (Mouse)
| Chr. | Chromosome 16 (mouse) |
| Band | 16 B3|16 26.83 cM | Start | 38,216,479 bp |
| Band | 16 B3|16 26.83 cM | End | 38,253,507 bp |
Gene ontology
| Molecular function | carboxylic ester hydrolase activity; hydrolase activity; phospholipase A1 activity; phosphatidylserine 1-acylhydrolase activity; lipase activity |
| Cellular component | acrosomal membrane; extracellular region; extracellular space |
| Biological process | lipid catabolic process; phosphatidylserine metabolic process; lipid metabolism; phosphatidylserine acyl-chain remodeling |
Sources:Amigo / QuickGO
Orthologs
| Databases | NCBI: entry; OMA: entry |
| Species | Human | Mouse |
| Entrez | 51365 | 85031 |
| Ensembl | ENSG00000144837 | ENSMUSG00000002847 |
| UniProt | Q53H76 | Q8VI78 |
| RefSeq (mRNA) | NM_001206960; NM_001206961; NM_001293225; NM_015900 | NM_134102 |
| RefSeq (protein) | NP_001193889; NP_001193890; NP_001280154; NP_056984 | NP_598863 |
| Location (UCSC) | n/a | Chr 16: 38.22 – 38.25 Mb |
| PubMed search |
- Wikidata
| View/Edit Human | View/Edit Mouse |

Phospholipase A1 member A (EC 3.1.1.111) is an enzyme that in humans is encoded by the PLA1A gene. It acts as a phospholipase enzyme which removes the 1-acyl group, and is able to catalyze the following two reactions

- a 1,2-diacyl-sn-glycero-3-phospho-L-serine + H2O ⇌ a 2-acyl-sn-glycero-3-phospho-L-serine + a fatty acid + H(+)
- a 1-acyl-sn-glycero-3-phospho-L-serine + H2O ⇌ sn-glycero-3-phospho-L-serine + a fatty acid + H(+)

Phospholipases are a type of enzyme that break down phospholipids, typically releasing fatty acids or other components. They are typically separated into different classes according to the type of phospholipid bond they break. In particular, phospholipase A_{1} (PLA_{1}) specifically catalyzes the cleavage at the sn-1 position of phospholipids, forming a fatty acid and a lysophospholipid.

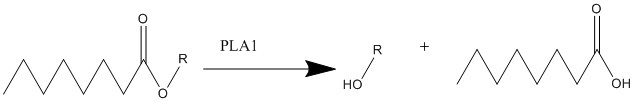
Phospholipase A_{1} cleaves phospholipid at the sn-1 position forming a lysophospholipid and a fatty acid.

== Substrate specificity ==
Optimum pH conditions for PLA_{1} activity on neutral phospholipids is around 7.5, whereas the optimal conditions for PLA_{1} activity on acidic phospholipids is around 4.

== Structure ==
The structure of a PLA_{1} is a monomer that contains the following sequence: Gly-X-Ser-X-Gly, where X represents any other amino acid. The serine is considered the active site in the enzyme. PLA_{1}'s also contain a catalytic triad of Ser-Asp-His, with a variety of cysteine residues needed for disulfide bond formation. The cysteine residues are responsible for key structural motifs such as the lid domain and the B9 domain, both of which are lipid binding surface loops. These two loops can vary between each PLA_{1}. For example, a PLA_{1} enzyme with a long lid domain (22-23 amino acids) and a long B9 domain (18-19 amino acids) constitute an extracellular PLA_{1} exhibiting triacylglycerol hydrolase activity. In contrast, a PLA_{1} enzyme that is considered more selective will have a short lid and B9 domain that span 7-12 and 12-13 amino acids, respectively.

== Industrial use ==
Unlike other phospholipases such as PLA_{2}, there is much that is unknown about PLA_{1} enzymes due to the difficulty of developing efficient ways to purify, clone, express, and characterize them.

== See also ==
- Outer membrane phospholipase A1
