= Angiopoietin-related protein 7 =

Protein found in humans

ANGPTL7

Identifiers
- Aliases: ANGPTL7, AngX, CDT6, dJ647M16.1, angiopoietin like 7
- External IDs: OMIM: 618517; MGI: 3605801; GeneCards: ANGPTL7

Gene location (Human)
Chr.	Chromosome 1 (human)
Band	1p36.22	Start	11,189,355 bp
Band	1p36.22	End	11,195,981 bp

Gene location (Mouse)
Chr.	Chromosome 4 (mouse)
Band	4|4 E2	Start	148,579,640 bp
Band	4|4 E2	End	148,584,917 bp
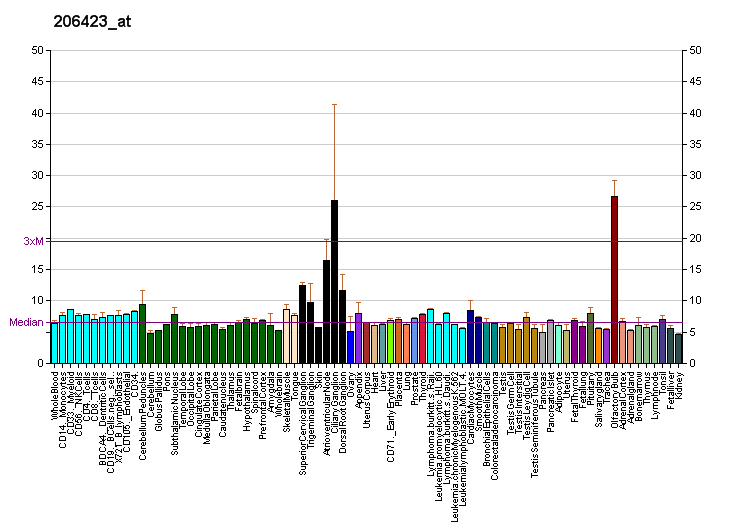
RNA expression pattern
Bgee	Human / Mouse (ortholog); Top expressed in: Achilles tendon; tibial nerve; sural nerve; tendon of biceps brachii; hair follicle; synovial joint; spinal ganglia; Descending thoracic aorta; testicle; ascending aorta / Top expressed in: ankle; skin of external ear; lip; muscle of thigh; aortic valve; interventricular septum; medial head of gastrocnemius muscle; right kidney; uterus; sciatic nerve; More reference expression data
BioGPS	More reference expression data
Gene ontology
Molecular function	protein binding
Cellular component	extracellular region
Biological process	response to oxidative stress
Sources:Amigo / QuickGO
Orthologs
Databases	NCBI: entry; OMA: entry
Species	Human	Mouse
Entrez	10218	654812
Ensembl	ENSG00000171819	ENSMUSG00000028989
UniProt	O43827	Q8R1Q3
RefSeq (mRNA)	NM_021146	NM_001039554
RefSeq (protein)	NP_066969	NP_001034643
Location (UCSC)	Chr 1: 11.19 – 11.2 Mb	Chr 4: 148.58 – 148.58 Mb
PubMed search
- Wikidata
View/Edit Human	View/Edit Mouse

Angiopoietin-related protein 7 is a protein that in humans is encoded by the ANGPTL7 gene.

It is one of the 8 angiopoietin-like proteins.

Rare protein-altering variants in ANGPTL7, including p.Gln175His (0.007 minor allele frequency in Non-Finnish European population) and p.R220C (0.048 minor allele frequency in Finland), lower intraocular pressure and protect against glaucoma.
