= Pancreatic enzymes (medication) =

Amylase, lipase, protease and lactase mixture

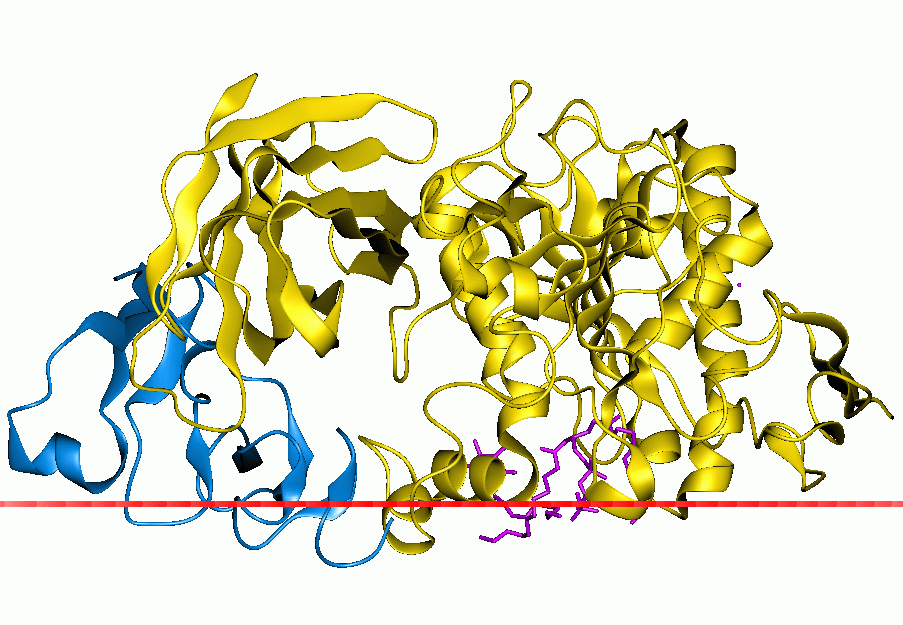
- Complex of lipase with colipase

Clinical data
- Trade names: Creon, Pancreaze, Pertzye, others
- AHFS/Drugs.com: Monograph
- MedlinePlus: a604035
- Routes of administration: By mouth
- ATC code: A09AA02 (WHO)

Legal status
- Legal status: AU: S4 (Prescription only); EU: Rx-only; In general: ℞ (Prescription only)

Identifiers
- CAS Number: 53608-75-6
- DrugBank: DB00085
- ChemSpider: none
- UNII: FQ3DRG0N5K
- CompTox Dashboard (EPA): DTXSID801009839
- ECHA InfoCard: 100.053.309

Pancreatic enzymes, also known as pancreases, pancrelipases or pancreatins are commercial mixtures of amylase, lipase, protease and lactase obtained from pigs. The components are digestive enzymes similar to those normally produced by the human pancreas. They help in the digestion of fats, starches, and proteins. They are used to treat malabsorption syndrome due to certain pancreatic insufficiencies. These pancreatic problems may be due to cystic fibrosis, surgical removal of the pancreas, long-term pancreatitis, pancreatic cancer, or MODY 5, among others. The preparation is taken by mouth. The treatment is also known as pancreatic enzyme replacement therapy or PERT.

Common side effects include vomiting, abdominal pain, constipation, and diarrhea. Other side effects include perianal irritation and high blood uric acid. Use is believed to be safe during pregnancy.

Pancreatic enzymes have been used as medications since at least the 1800s. They are on the World Health Organization's List of Essential Medicines. In 2023, it was the 258th most commonly prescribed medication in the United States, with more than 1 million prescriptions.

== Medical uses ==
Pancrelipases are generally a first line approach in treatment of exocrine pancreatic insufficiency and other digestive disorders, accompanying cystic fibrosis, complicating surgical pancreatectomy, or resulting from chronic pancreatitis. The formulations are generally hard capsules filled with gastro-resistant granules. Pancrelipases and pancreatins are similar, except pancrelipases has an increased lipase component.

Pancreatin is a mixture of several digestive enzymes produced by the exocrine cells of the pancreas. It is composed of amylase, lipase and protease. This mixture is used to treat conditions in which pancreatic secretions are deficient, such as surgical pancreatectomy, pancreatitis and cystic fibrosis. It has been claimed to help with food allergies, celiac disease, autoimmune disease, cancer and weight loss. Pancreatin is sometimes called "pancreatic acid", although it is neither a single chemical substance nor an acid.

A similar mixture of enzymes is sold as pancrelipase, which contains more active lipase enzyme than does pancreatin. The trypsin found in pancreatin works to hydrolyze proteins into oligopeptides; amylase hydrolyzes starches into oligosaccharides and the disaccharide maltose; and lipase hydrolyzes triglycerides into fatty acids and glycerols. Pancreatin is an effective enzyme supplement for replacing missing pancreatic enzymes, and aids in the digestion of foods in cases of pancreatic insufficiency.

Pancreatin reduces the absorption of iron from food in the duodenum during digestion.

Some contact lens-cleaning solutions contain porcine pancreatin extractives to assist in the intended protein-removal process.

== Side effects ==
High doses over a long period of time are associated with fibrosing colonopathy. Due to this association a maximum dose of 10,000 IU of lipase per kilogram per day is recommended.

Though never reported there is a theoretical risk of a viral infection as they are from pigs.

== Society and culture ==
=== Brand names ===
Brand names include Creon, Pancreaze, Pertzye, Sollpura (Liprotamase (Note: Did not make it past Phase 3 trials)), Ultresa, and Zenpep.

In some countries, Creon is marketed by Viatris after Upjohn merged with Mylan to create Viatris.

=== Legal status ===
==== United States ====
Longstanding pancreatic enzyme replacement products (PERPs)—some in use for a century or more—fell under a 2006 FDA requirement that pharmaceutical companies with porcine-derived PERP products submit a New Drug Application (NDA) for each; Creon (AbbVie Inc.), the first of the commercial PERP products approved after the FDA directive, reached market in 2009.

The specific requirement and reasoning for the FDA directive was that manufacturers submit a Risk Evaluation and Mitigation Strategy (REMS) and Medication Guide to ensure patients are adequately informed regarding potential risks associated with administration of high doses of porcine-derived PERP products, especially with regard to "the theoretical risk of transmission of viral disease from pigs to patients", the risk of which (alongside other off-target effects) is reduced by patient adherence to label dosing instructions.

=== Shortages and alternatives ===
Due to its non-constant supply, being sourced from pigs, there have been several pancreatin shortages in different markets.

This has led for alternative sources of enzymes to be studied and commercialised, mainly being of bacterial or fungal origin.
