= Phospholipase A =

Phospholipase A can refer to:

- Phospholipase A1
- Phospholipase A2
- Outer membrane phospholipase A1

An enzyme that displays both phospholipase A1 and phospholipase A2 activities is called a Phospholipase B (see main article on phospholipases).
