= GPIHBP1 =

Protein-coding gene in the species Homo sapiens

Identifiers
- Aliases: GPIHBP1, GPI-HBP1, HYPL1D, glycosylphosphatidylinositol anchored high density lipoprotein binding protein 1
- External IDs: OMIM: 612757; MGI: 1915703; GeneCards: GPIHBP1

Gene location (Human)
Chr.	Chromosome 8 (human)
Band	8q24.3	Start	143,213,218 bp
Band	8q24.3	End	143,217,170 bp

Gene location (Mouse)
Chr.	Chromosome 15 (mouse)
Band	15|15 D3	Start	75,468,477 bp
Band	15|15 D3	End	75,471,330 bp
RNA expression pattern
Bgee	Human / Mouse (ortholog); Top expressed in: apex of heart; C1 segment; abdominal fat; subcutaneous adipose tissue; substantia nigra; left ventricle; sural nerve; upper lobe of left lung; right lung; muscle of leg / Top expressed in: right lung; right lung lobe; interventricular septum; brown adipose tissue; myocardium of ventricle; muscle of thigh; soleus muscle; thoracic diaphragm; tibialis anterior muscle; digastric muscle; More reference expression data
BioGPS	n/a
Gene ontology
Molecular function	lipid binding; protein transmembrane transporter activity; lipase binding; chylomicron binding; lipoprotein particle binding; protein binding
Cellular component	membrane; intracellular anatomical structure; basolateral plasma membrane; apical plasma membrane; anchored component of external side of plasma membrane; high-density lipoprotein particle; anchored component of membrane; extracellular region; plasma membrane; external side of plasma membrane
Biological process	protein transmembrane transport; response to heparin; regulation of lipoprotein lipase activity; intracellular protein transport; protein import; protein localization to cell surface; cholesterol homeostasis; transcytosis; protein stabilization; positive regulation of lipoprotein lipase activity; triglyceride homeostasis; positive regulation of chylomicron remnant clearance; retinoid metabolic process; chylomicron remodeling
Sources:Amigo / QuickGO
Orthologs
Databases	NCBI: entry; OMA: entry
Species	Human	Mouse
Entrez	338328	68453
Ensembl	ENSG00000277494	ENSMUSG00000022579
UniProt	Q8IV16	Q9D1N2
RefSeq (mRNA)	NM_178172; NM_001301772	NM_026730; NM_001347039; NM_001361294
RefSeq (protein)	NP_001288701; NP_835466	NP_001333968; NP_081006; NP_001348223
Location (UCSC)	Chr 8: 143.21 – 143.22 Mb	Chr 15: 75.47 – 75.47 Mb
PubMed search
- Wikidata
View/Edit Human	View/Edit Mouse

Glycosylphosphatidylinositol anchored high density lipoprotein binding protein 1 (GPI-HBP1) also known as high density lipoprotein-binding protein 1 is a protein that in humans is encoded by the GPIHBP1 gene.

== Function ==
Dietary fats are packaged by intestine into triglyceride-rich lipoproteins called chylomicrons. The triglycerides in chylomicrons are hydrolyzed by lipoprotein lipase (LPL) along the luminal surface of capillaries, mainly in heart, skeletal muscle, and adipose tissue. GPIHBP1 is a capillary endothelial cell protein that provides a platform for LPL-mediated processing of chylomicrons.
