= ANGPTL3 =

Protein found in humans

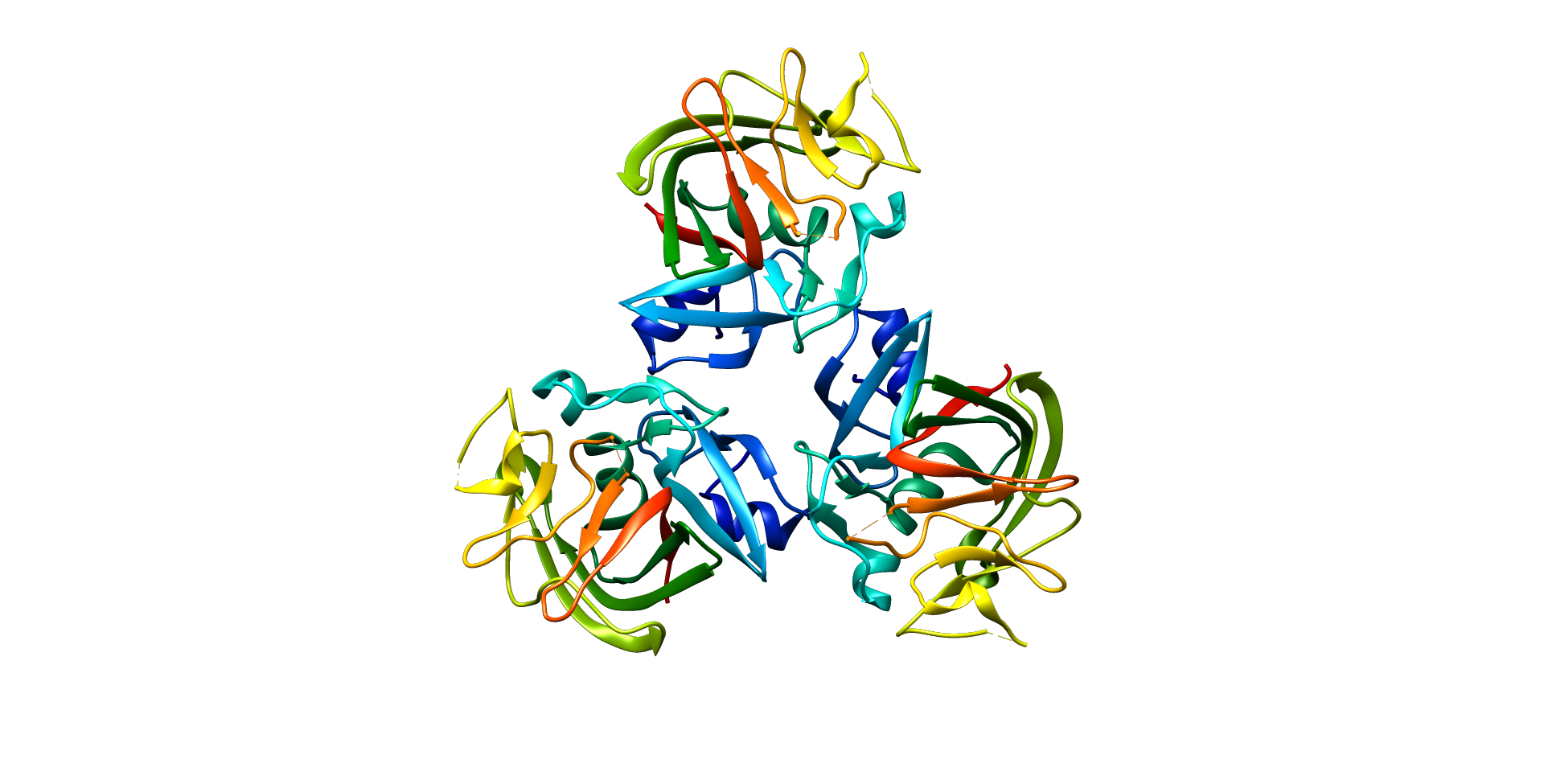

Identifiers
- Aliases: ANGPTL3, ANG-5, ANGPT5, ANL3, FHBL2, angiopoietin like 3
- External IDs: OMIM: 604774; MGI: 1353627; GeneCards: ANGPTL3
Available structures
PDB	Ortholog search: PDBe RCSB
PDB	List of PDB id codes 6EUA

Gene location (Human)
Chr.	Chromosome 1 (human)
Band	1p31.3	Start	62,597,520 bp
Band	1p31.3	End	62,606,313 bp

Gene location (Mouse)
Chr.	Chromosome 4 (mouse)
Band	4 C6|4 45.6 cM	Start	98,919,191 bp
Band	4 C6|4 45.6 cM	End	98,934,348 bp
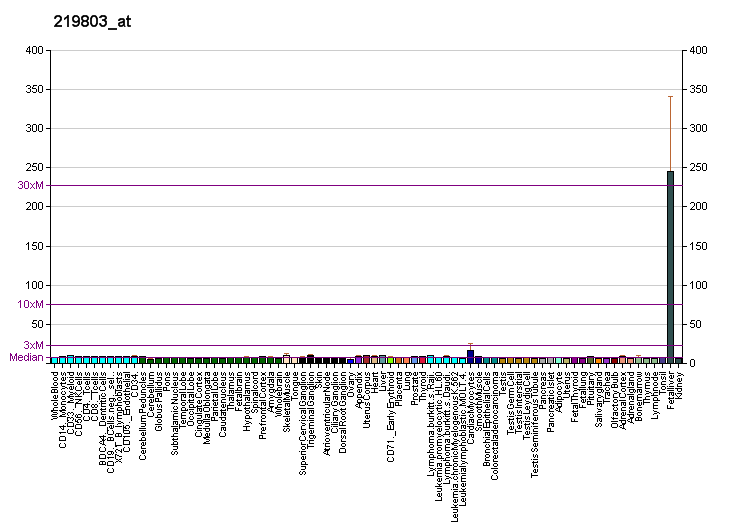
RNA expression pattern
Bgee	Human / Mouse (ortholog); Top expressed in: right lobe of liver; kidney tubule; metanephric glomerulus; human kidney; testicle; gonad; buccal mucosa cell; Achilles tendon; epithelium of colon; stomach / Top expressed in: left lobe of liver; fetal liver hematopoietic progenitor cell; right kidney; human fetus; tail of embryo; sexually immature organism; blastocyst; human kidney; embryo; embryo; More reference expression data
BioGPS	More reference expression data
Gene ontology
Molecular function	phospholipase inhibitor activity; enzyme inhibitor activity; integrin binding; growth factor activity; heparin binding
Cellular component	Golgi apparatus; cell surface; early endosome; cell projection; lamellipodium; extracellular region; extracellular space
Biological process	phospholipid homeostasis; positive regulation of cell migration; positive regulation of lipid catabolic process; lipid storage; cholesterol metabolic process; fatty acid metabolic process; positive regulation of angiogenesis; artery morphogenesis; lipid homeostasis; phospholipid catabolic process; integrin-mediated signaling pathway; negative regulation of lipoprotein lipase activity; response to hormone; phospholipid metabolic process; cholesterol homeostasis; acylglycerol homeostasis; cell-matrix adhesion; glycerol metabolic process; negative regulation of phospholipase activity; triglyceride homeostasis; signal transduction; lipid metabolism; cell adhesion; angiogenesis; regulation of lipoprotein lipase activity; regulation of signaling receptor activity
Sources:Amigo / QuickGO
Orthologs
Databases	NCBI: entry; OMA: entry
Species	Human	Mouse
Entrez	27329	30924
Ensembl	ENSG00000132855	ENSMUSG00000028553
UniProt	Q9Y5C1	Q9R182
RefSeq (mRNA)	NM_014495	NM_013913
RefSeq (protein)	NP_055310	NP_038941
Location (UCSC)	Chr 1: 62.6 – 62.61 Mb	Chr 4: 98.92 – 98.93 Mb
PubMed search
- Wikidata
View/Edit Human	View/Edit Mouse

Angiopoietin-like 3, also known as ANGPTL3, is a protein that in humans is encoded by the ANGPTL3 gene.

== Function ==
The protein encoded by this gene is a member of the angiopoietin-like family of secreted factors. It is expressed predominantly in the liver, and has the characteristic structure of angiopoietins, consisting of a signal peptide, N-terminal coiled-coil domain, and the C-terminal fibrinogen (FBN)-like domain. The FBN-like domain in angiopoietin-like 3 protein was shown to bind alpha-5/beta-3 integrins, and this binding induced endothelial cell adhesion and migration. This protein may also play a role in the regulation of angiogenesis.

Angptl3 also acts as dual inhibitor of lipoprotein lipase (LPL) and endothelial lipase (EL), thereby increasing plasma triglyceride, LDL cholesterol and HDL cholesterol in mice and humans.

ANGPTL3 inhibits endothelial lipase hydrolysis of HDL-phospholipid (PL), thereby increasing HDL-PL levels. Circulating PL-rich HDL particles have high cholesterol efflux abilities.

Angptl3 plays a major role in promoting uptake of circulating triglycerides into white adipose tissue in the fed state, likely through activation by Angptl8, a feeding-induced hepatokine, to inhibit postprandial LPL activity in cardiac and skeletal muscles, as suggested by the ANGPTL3-4-8 model.

== Clinical significance ==
In human, ANGPTL3 is a determinant factor of HDL level and positively correlates with plasma HDL cholesterol.

In humans with genetic loss-of-function variants in one copy of ANGPTL3, the serum LDL-C levels are reduced. In those with loss-of-function variants in both copies of ANGPTL3, low LDL-C, low HDL-C, and low triglycerides are seen ("familial combined hypolipidemia").
