= Angiopoietin-related protein 2 =

Protein-coding gene in the species Homo sapiens

ANGPTL2

Identifiers
- Aliases: ANGPTL2, ARP2, HARP, angiopoietin like 2
- External IDs: OMIM: 605001; MGI: 1347002; GeneCards: ANGPTL2

Gene location (Human)
| Chr. | Chromosome 9 (human) |
| Band | 9q33.3 | Start | 127,087,348 bp |
| Band | 9q33.3 | End | 127,122,635 bp |

Gene location (Mouse)
| Chr. | Chromosome 2 (mouse) |
| Band | 2|2 B | Start | 33,106,081 bp |
| Band | 2|2 B | End | 33,137,729 bp |
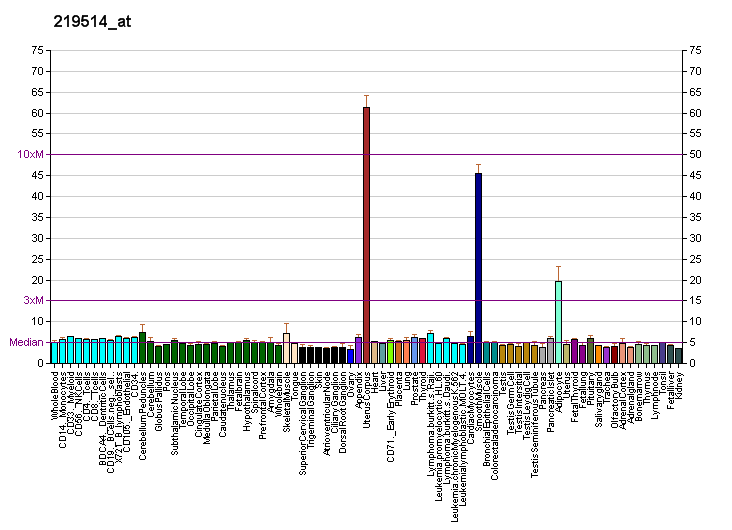

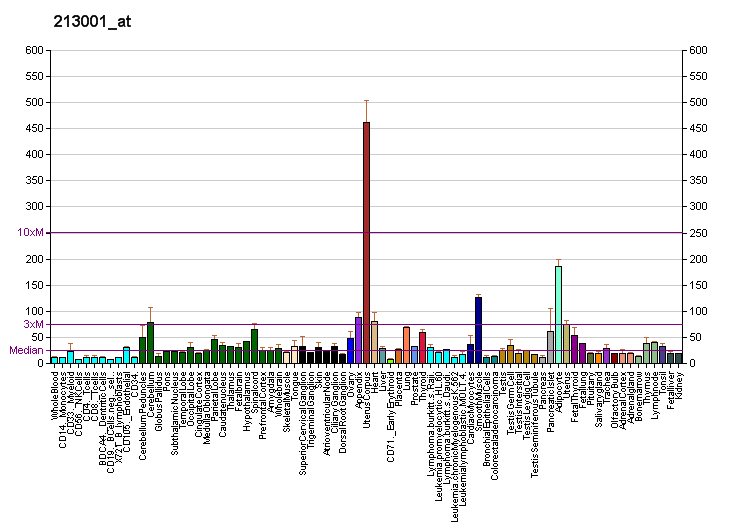

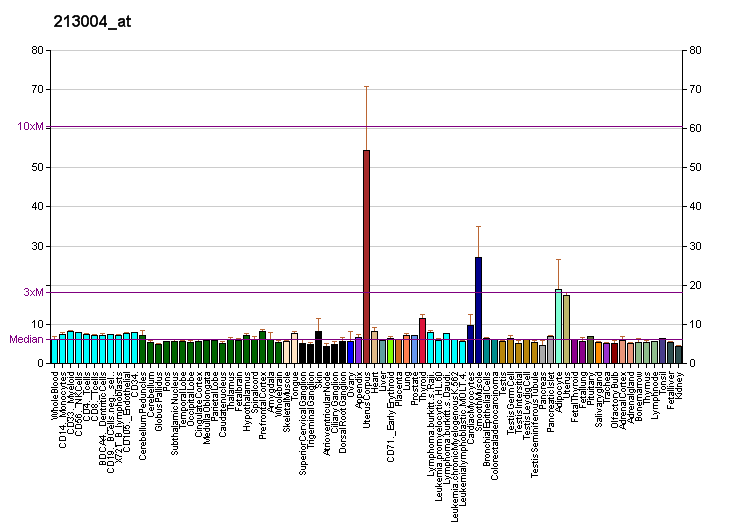
RNA expression pattern
| Bgee | Human / Mouse (ortholog); Top expressed in: tendon of biceps brachii; synovial joint; synovial membrane; tibia; gallbladder; abdominal fat; glutes; subcutaneous adipose tissue; stromal cell of endometrium; gastric mucosa / Top expressed in: ankle; lactiferous gland; body of femur; choroid plexus of fourth ventricle; extensor digitorum longus muscle; umbilical cord; extraocular muscle; right ventricle; lip; plantaris muscle; More reference expression data |
| BioGPS | More reference expression data |
Gene ontology
| Molecular function | signaling receptor binding; protein binding |
| Cellular component | extracellular region; extracellular exosome; extracellular space; collagen-containing extracellular matrix |
| Biological process | multicellular organism development |
Sources:Amigo / QuickGO
Orthologs
| Databases | NCBI: entry; OMA: entry |
| Species | Human | Mouse |
| Entrez | 23452 | 26360 |
| Ensembl | ENSG00000136859 | ENSMUSG00000004105 |
| UniProt | Q9UKU9 | Q9R045 |
| RefSeq (mRNA) | NM_012098 | NM_011923 |
| RefSeq (protein) | NP_036230 | NP_036053 |
| Location (UCSC) | Chr 9: 127.09 – 127.12 Mb | Chr 2: 33.11 – 33.14 Mb |
| PubMed search |
- Wikidata
| View/Edit Human | View/Edit Mouse |

Angiopoietin-related protein 2 also known as angiopoietin-like protein 2 is a protein that in humans is encoded by the ANGPTL2 gene.

== Function ==
Angiopoietin-like protein 2 maintains tissue homeostasis by promoting adaptive inflammation and subsequent tissue reconstruction, whereas an excess of ANGPTL2 activation induced by prolonged stress promotes the breakdown of tissue homeostasis due to chronic inflammation, promoting the development of metabolic diseases. ANGPTL2 has a role also in angiogenesis, in tissue repair, in obesity, in atherosclerotic diseases and finally in carcinogenesis.

Angiopoietins are members of the vascular endothelial growth factor family and the only known growth factors largely specific for the vascular endothelium. Angiopoietin-1, angiopoietin-2, and angiopoietin-4 participate in the formation of blood vessels. ANGPTL2 protein is a secreted glycoprotein with homology to the angiopoietins and may exert a function on endothelial cells through autocrine or paracrine action.
