= PNLIPRP2 =

Protein-coding gene in humans

Identifiers
- Aliases: PNLIPRP2, PLRP2, pancreatic lipase related protein 2 (gene/pseudogene)
- External IDs: OMIM: 604423; MGI: 1336202; GeneCards: PNLIPRP2
Available structures
PDB	Ortholog search: PDBe RCSB
PDB	List of PDB id codes 2OXE, 2PVS
Enzyme activity
EC #	BRENDA	ExPASy	KEGG	MetaCyc
3.1.1.3	↗	↗	↗	↗
3.1.1.26	↗	↗	↗	↗

Gene location (Human)
Chr.	Chromosome 10 (human)
Band	10q25.3	Start	116,620,953 bp
Band	10q25.3	End	116,645,143 bp

Gene location (Mouse)
Chr.	Chromosome 19 (mouse)
Band	19|19 D2	Start	58,748,151 bp
Band	19|19 D2	End	58,765,966 bp
RNA expression pattern
Bgee	Human / Mouse (ortholog); Top expressed in: body of pancreas; jejunal mucosa; duodenum; islet of Langerhans; rectum; mucosa of ileum; mucosa of sigmoid colon; pancreatic epithelial cell; mucosa of transverse colon; testicle / Top expressed in: crypt of lieberkuhn of small intestine; pyloric antrum; Paneth cell; epithelium of stomach; mucous cell of stomach; islet of Langerhans; jejunum; duodenum; ileum; morula; More reference expression data
BioGPS	n/a
Gene ontology
Molecular function	calcium ion binding; phospholipase activity; carboxylic ester hydrolase activity; hydrolase activity; metal ion binding; triglyceride lipase activity; acylglycerol lipase activity; galactolipase activity; 1-18:1-2-16:0-monogalactosyldiacylglycerol lipase activity; lipase activity
Cellular component	extracellular region; extracellular space
Biological process	lipid catabolic process; galactolipid catabolic process; lipid digestion; triglyceride metabolic process; lipid metabolism; phospholipid catabolic process; cellular defense response; intestinal lipid catabolic process; response to bacterium
Sources:Amigo / QuickGO
Orthologs
Databases	NCBI: entry; OMA: entry
Species	Human	Mouse
Entrez	5408	18947
Ensembl	ENSG00000266200	ENSMUSG00000025091
UniProt	P54317	P17892
RefSeq (mRNA)	NM_005396	NM_011128
RefSeq (protein)	NP_005387	NP_035258
Location (UCSC)	Chr 10: 116.62 – 116.65 Mb	Chr 19: 58.75 – 58.77 Mb
PubMed search
- Wikidata
View/Edit Human	View/Edit Mouse

Pancreatic lipase related protein 2 (or PLRP2) is an enzyme that in humans is encoded by the PNLIPRP2 gene. PLRP2 is a digestive enzyme and lipase that is found in pancreatic juice. Nonsense mutations in PNLIPRP2 (eg: W358X) are very common in certain ethnic groups, with allele frequencies as high as 30-50%, and notably the allele in the reference genome is a non-coding allele. PLRP2 is part of the pancreatic lipase family.

== Function ==
Like many lipases, one of PLRP2's main functions is to break down triglycerides. However, it is distinct from other lipases found in humans by being able to act on galactosylglycerides, making it a galactolipase. Since the primary digestive lipase, pancreatic lipase, is not expressed in newborn human babies, it is thought that PLRP2 may play a role in their digestion of lipids.

Like pancreatic lipase, PLRP2 is secreted by pancreatic acinar cells into an enzyme-rich fluid called pancreatic juice. This fluid is released into the first part of the small intestines (the duodenum) in response to eating, which triggers nerve signaling and the release of hormones like cholecystokinin.
