= Lipase member I =

Enzyme found in humans

LIPI

Identifiers
- Aliases: LIPI, CT17, LPDL, PLA1C, PRED5, mPA-PLA1 beta, lipase I
- External IDs: OMIM: 609252; MGI: 2443868; GeneCards: LIPI

Gene location (Human)
| Chr. | Chromosome 21 (human) |
| Band | 21q11.2 | Start | 14,108,813 bp |
| Band | 21q11.2 | End | 14,210,955 bp |

Gene location (Mouse)
| Chr. | Chromosome 16 (mouse) |
| Band | 16|16 C3.1 | Start | 75,337,402 bp |
| Band | 16|16 C3.1 | End | 75,382,949 bp |
RNA expression pattern
| Bgee | Human / Mouse (ortholog); Top expressed in: corpus epididymis; testicle; tail of epididymis; caput epididymis; body of uterus; tibia; muscle layer of sigmoid colon; left lobe of thyroid gland; ganglionic eminence; ectocervix / Top expressed in: mandible; upper jaw; calvaria; fossa; maxilla; spermatid; white adipose tissue; More reference expression data |
| BioGPS | n/a |
Gene ontology
| Molecular function | heparin binding; carboxylic ester hydrolase activity; hydrolase activity; phospholipase activity; lipase activity |
| Cellular component | extracellular region; plasma membrane; membrane; extracellular space |
| Biological process | lipid catabolic process; lipid metabolism; phosphatidic acid biosynthetic process |
Sources:Amigo / QuickGO
Orthologs
| Databases | NCBI: entry; OMA: entry |
| Species | Human | Mouse |
| Entrez | 149998 | 320355 |
| Ensembl | ENSG00000188992 | ENSMUSG00000032948 |
| UniProt | Q6XZB0 | n/a |
| RefSeq (mRNA) | NM_001302998; NM_001302999; NM_001303000; NM_001303001; NM_145317 NM_198996; NM_001379565; NM_001379566 | NM_001252513; NM_177142 |
| RefSeq (protein) | NP_001289927; NP_001289928; NP_001289929; NP_001289930; NP_945347 NP_001366494; NP_001366495 | n/a |
| Location (UCSC) | Chr 21: 14.11 – 14.21 Mb | Chr 16: 75.34 – 75.38 Mb |
| PubMed search |
- Wikidata
| View/Edit Human | View/Edit Mouse |

Lipase member I (also called Phosphatidic acid-specific PLA1β) is an enzyme that in humans is encoded by the LIPI gene. Lipase member I functions as a phospholipase that acts specifically on phosphatidic acid, producing lysophosphatidic acid (LPA) and a fatty acid. Lysophosphatidic acid is an important signaling molecule, though the significance of this enzyme and its paralog Lipase member H in LPA production remains uncertain.

== Medical significance ==
Defects in this gene are a cause of susceptibility to familial hypertrigliceridemia. This gene is also expressed at high levels in Ewing family tumor cells.
