= Function test =

Function test (or functional test) can refer to:

- Thyroid function tests
- Liver function tests
- Lung function test
- Functional testing
