= Galactolipase =

Class of enzymes

galactolipase

Identifiers
- EC no.: 3.1.1.26
- CAS no.: 37278-40-3

Databases
- BRENDA: enzyme data
- ExPASy: NiceZyme view
- KEGG: enzyme entry
- MetaCyc: metabolic pathway
- Rhea: reactions
- PDB structures: RCSB PDB PDBe PDBsum
- Gene Ontology: AmiGO / QuickGO
Search
- PMC: articles
- PubMed: articles
- NCBI: proteins

The enzyme galactolipase (EC 3.1.1.26) catalyzes the reaction

1,2-diacyl-3-β-D-galactosyl-sn-glycerol + 2 H_{2}O $\rightleftharpoons$ 3-β-D-galactosyl-sn-glycerol + 2 carboxylates

The only reported isozyme in humans is encoded by the gene PNLIPRP2. This enzyme belongs to the family of hydrolases, specifically those acting on carboxylic ester bonds. The systematic name of this enzyme class is 1,2-diacyl-3-β-D-galactosyl-sn-glycerol acylhydrolase. Other names in common use include galactolipid lipase, polygalactolipase, and galactolipid acylhydrolase. This enzyme participates in glycerolipid metabolism.
