= ANGPTL4 =

Protein-coding gene in the species Homo sapiens

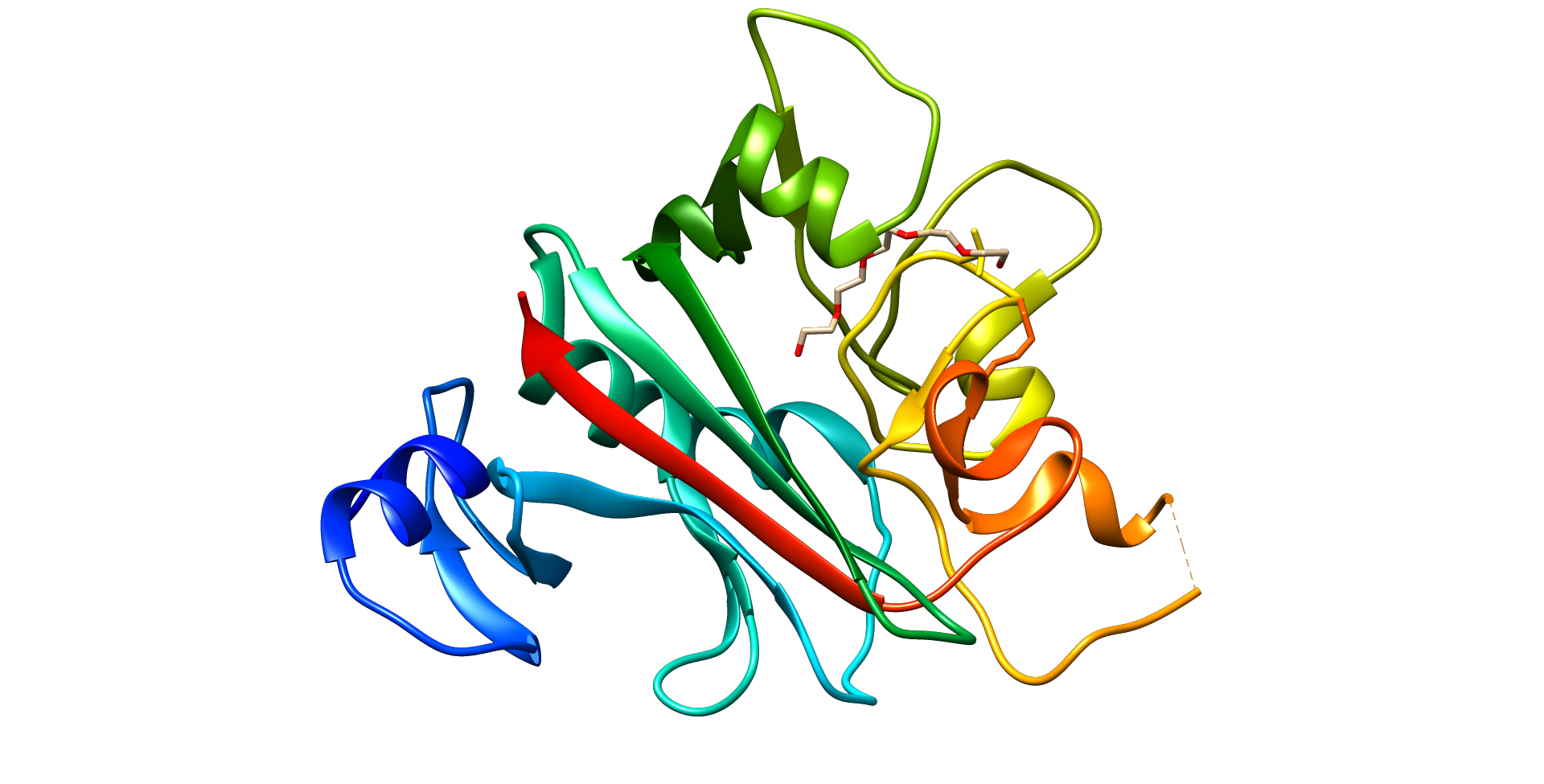

Identifiers
- Aliases: ANGPTL4, ANGPTL2, ARP4, FIAF, HARP, HFARP, NL2, PGAR, TGQTL, UNQ171, pp1158, angiopoietin like 4
- External IDs: OMIM: 604774, 605910; MGI: 1888999; GeneCards: ANGPTL4
Available structures
PDB	Ortholog search: PDBe RCSB
PDB	List of PDB id codes 6EUB, 6U0A, 6U1U, 6U73

Gene location (Human)
Chr.	Chromosome 19 (human)
Band	19p13.2	Start	8,363,289 bp
Band	19p13.2	End	8,374,370 bp

Gene location (Mouse)
Chr.	Chromosome 17 (mouse)
Band	17|17 B1	Start	33,992,724 bp
Band	17|17 B1	End	34,000,804 bp
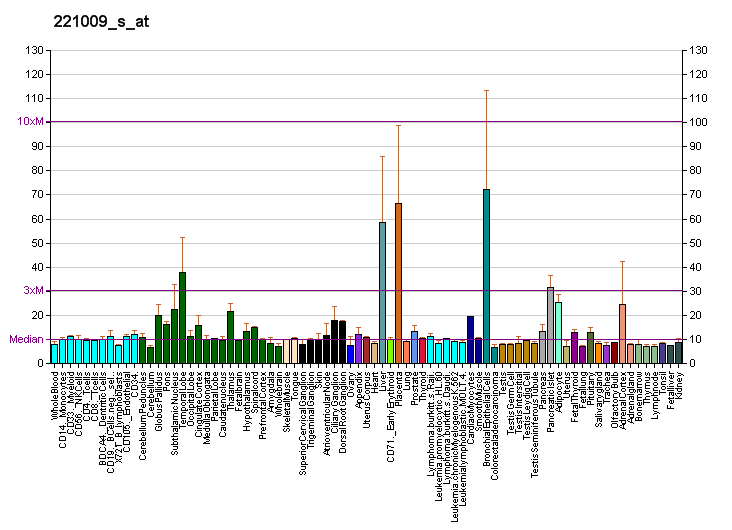
RNA expression pattern
Bgee	Human / Mouse (ortholog); Top expressed in: pericardium; beta cell; sural nerve; subcutaneous adipose tissue; right lobe of liver; vena cava; saphenous vein; body of pancreas; gastric mucosa; cartilage tissue / Top expressed in: brown adipose tissue; white adipose tissue; tunica adventitia of aorta; left lobe of liver; subcutaneous adipose tissue; lactiferous gland; external carotid artery; mesenteric lymph nodes; right lung lobe; proximal tubule; More reference expression data
BioGPS	More reference expression data
Gene ontology
Molecular function	enzyme inhibitor activity; protein binding; identical protein binding
Cellular component	extracellular region; blood microparticle; extracellular space
Biological process	multicellular organism development; negative regulation of lipoprotein lipase activity; cell differentiation; negative regulation of endothelial cell apoptotic process; negative regulation of apoptotic process; response to hypoxia; protein homooligomerization; angiogenesis; triglyceride homeostasis; positive regulation of angiogenesis; regulation of lipid metabolic process; lipid metabolism
Sources:Amigo / QuickGO
Orthologs
Databases	NCBI: entry; OMA: entry
Species	Human	Mouse
Entrez	51129	57875
Ensembl	ENSG00000167772	ENSMUSG00000002289
UniProt	Q9BY76	Q9Z1P8
RefSeq (mRNA)	NM_001039667; NM_016109; NM_139314	NM_020581
RefSeq (protein)	NP_001034756; NP_647475	NP_065606
Location (UCSC)	Chr 19: 8.36 – 8.37 Mb	Chr 17: 33.99 – 34 Mb
PubMed search
- Wikidata
View/Edit Human	View/Edit Mouse

Angiopoietin-like 4 is a protein that in humans is encoded by the ANGPTL4 gene. Alternatively spliced transcript variants encoded with different isoforms have been described. This gene was previously referred to as ANGPTL2, HFARP, PGAR, or FIAF but has been renamed ANGPTL4.

This gene is induced under hypoxic (low oxygen) condition in various cell types and is the target of peroxisome proliferator-activated receptors. The encoded protein is a serum hormone directly involved in regulating lipid metabolism.

ANGPTL4 plays an important role in numerous cancers and is implicated in the metastatic process by modulating vascular permeability, cancer cell motility and invasiveness.

== Name ==
The former name, FIAF, stands for Fasting-Induced Adipose Factor.

== Structure ==
This gene is a member of the angiopoietin-like gene family and encodes a glycosylated, secreted protein with a coiled-coil N-terminal domain and a fibrinogen-like C-terminal domain.

== Expression ==
In mice, the highest mRNA expression levels of ANGPTL4 are found in white and brown adipose tissue, followed by liver, kidney, muscle and intestinal tissues. Human ANGPTL4 is most highly expressed in the liver as a hepatokine.

== Function ==
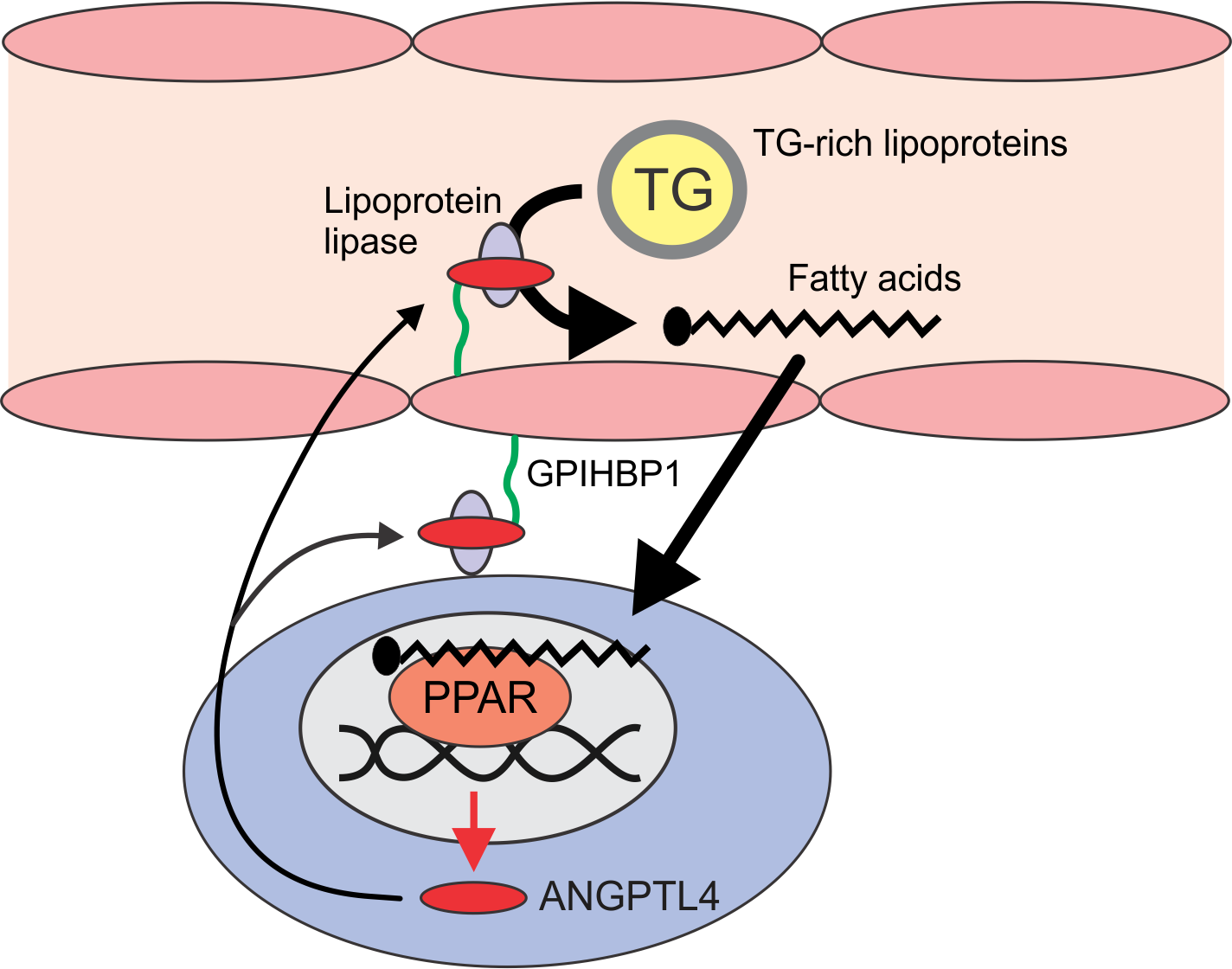
Picture depicts role of ANGPTL4 as endogenous inhibitor of lipoprotein lipase and its regulation by fatty acids via Peroxisome Proliferator Activated Receptors

This gene is induced under hypoxic (low oxygen) condition in various cell types and is the target of peroxisome proliferator-activated receptors. The encoded protein is a serum hormone directly involved in regulating lipid metabolism. The native full length ANGPTL4 can form higher order structures via intermolecular disulfide bonds. The N-terminal region of ANGPTL4 (nANGPTL4) is responsible for its assembly. The full length ANGPTL4 undergoes proteolytic cleavage at the linker region, releasing nANGPTL4 and the monomeric C-terminal portion of ANGPTL4 (cANGPTL4). The nANGPTL4 and cANGPTL4 have different biological functions. Monoclonal antibodies targeting the nANGPTL4 and cANGPTL4 have been developed to distinguish their functions.

== Clinical significance ==
ANGPTL4 plays an important role in numerous cancers and is implicated in the metastatic process by modulating vascular permeability, cancer cell motility and invasiveness. ANGPTL4 contributes to tumor growth and protects cells from anoikis, a form of programmed cell death induced when contact-dependent cells detach from the surrounding tissue matrix. ANGPTL4 secreted from tumors can bind to integrins, activating downstream signaling and leading to the production of superoxide to promote tumorigenesis. ANGPTL4 disrupts endothelial cell junctions by directly interacting with integrin, VE-cadherin and claudin-5 in a sequential manner to facilitate metastasis. ANGPTL4, specifically the C-terminal fragment (cANGPTL4), is a key player that coordinates an increase in cellular energy flux crucial for epithelial-mesenchymal transition (EMT) via an ANGPTL4:YWHAG (14-3-3γ) signaling axis. The ANGPTL4:YWHAG signaling axis confers metabolic flexibility and enhances EMT competency through interaction with specific phosphorylation signals on target proteins. A direct consequence is that ANGPTL4 secures ample cellular energy to fuel multiple ABC transporters to confer EMT-mediated chemoresistance.

ANGPTL4 functions as a matricellular protein to facilitate skin wound healing. ANGPTL4-deficient mice exhibit delayed wound reepithelialization with impaired keratinocyte migration, angiogenesis and altered inflammatory response. ANGPTL4 induces nitric oxide production through an integrin/JAK/STAT3-mediated upregulation of iNOS expression in wound epithelia, and enhances angiogenesis to accelerate wound healing in diabetic mice. ANGPTL4 induces a β-catenin-mediated upregulation of ID3 in fibroblasts to reduce scar collagen expression. ANGPTL4 is capable of reversing the fibroblast-to-myofibroblast differentiation induced aligned electrospun fibrous substrates. Cyclic stretching of human tendon fibroblasts stimulated the expression and release of ANGPTL4 protein via TGF-β and HIF-1α signalling, and the released ANGPTL4 was pro-angiogenic. ANGPTL4 is also a potent angiogenic factor whose expression is up-regulated in hypoxic retinal Müller cells in vitro and the ischemic retina in vivo. The expression of ANGPTL4 was increased in the aqueous and vitreous of proliferative diabetic retinopathy patients and localized to areas of retinal neovascularization.

ANGPTL4 has been established as a potent inhibitor of serum triglyceride (TG) clearance, causing elevation of serum TG levels via inhibition of the enzyme lipoprotein lipase (LPL). Biochemical studies indicate that ANGPTL4 disables LPL partly by dissociating the catalytically active LPL dimer into inactive LPL monomers. However, evidence also suggests that ANGPTL4 functions as a conventional, non-competitive inhibitor that binds to LPL to prevent the hydrolysis of substrate as part of reversible mechanism. As a consequence, ANGPTL4 knockout mice have reduced serum triglyceride levels, whereas the opposite is true for mice over-expressing ANGPTL4. ANGPTL4 suppresses foam cell formation to reduce atherosclerosis development. The reduction in LPL activity in adipose tissue during fasting is likely caused by increased local production of ANGPTL4. In other tissues such as heart, production of ANGPTL4 is stimulated by fatty acids and may serve to protect cells against excess fat uptake. ANGPTL4 is more highly induced in nonexercising muscle than in exercising human muscle during acute exercise. ANGPTL4 in nonexercising muscle presumably leads to reduced local uptake of plasma triglyceride-derived fatty acids and their sparing for use by exercising muscle. The induction of ANGPTL4 in exercising muscle likely is counteracted via AMP-activated protein kinase (AMPK)-mediated down-regulation, promoting the use of plasma triglycerides as fuel for active muscles.

High-throughput RNA sequencing of lung tissue samples from the 1918 and 2009 influenza pandemic revealed that ANGPTL4 was one of the most significantly upregulated gene. Murine influenza infection of the lungs stimulated the expression of ANGPTL4 via a STAT3-mediated mechanism. ANGPTL4 enhanced pulmonary tissue leakiness and exacerbated inflammation-induced lung damage. Influenza-infected ANGPTL4-knockout mice displayed diminished lung damage and recovered faster from the infection compared to wild-type mice. The treatment of infected mice with neutralizing anti-ANGPTL4 antibodies significantly accelerated pulmonary recovery and improved lung tissue integrity. It was also shown that antibody treatment against ANGPTL4 reduces pulmonary edema and injury in secondary pneumococcal pneumonia.
