= Endothelial lipase =

Enzyme found in humans

LIPG

Identifiers
- Aliases: LIPG, EDL, EL, PRO719, lipase G, endothelial type
- External IDs: OMIM: 603684; MGI: 1341803; GeneCards: LIPG
Enzyme activity
EC #	BRENDA	ExPASy	KEGG	MetaCyc
3.1.1.3	↗	↗	↗	↗
3.1.1.32	↗	↗	↗	↗

Gene location (Human)
Chr.	Chromosome 18 (human)
Band	18q21.1	Start	49,560,699 bp
Band	18q21.1	End	49,599,185 bp

Gene location (Mouse)
Chr.	Chromosome 18 (mouse)
Band	18|18 E2	Start	75,072,393 bp
Band	18|18 E2	End	75,094,334 bp
RNA expression pattern
Bgee	Human / Mouse (ortholog); Top expressed in: ventricular zone; right lobe of thyroid gland; left lobe of thyroid gland; right lobe of liver; ganglionic eminence; retinal pigment epithelium; placenta; secondary oocyte; seminal vesicula; gallbladder / Top expressed in: gastrula; decidua; lumbar spinal ganglion; right lung lobe; corpus luteum; left lobe of liver; left colon; ventricular zone; hair; left lung; More reference expression data
BioGPS	n/a
Gene ontology
Molecular function	heparin binding; triglyceride lipase activity; phospholipase activity; carboxylic ester hydrolase activity; phospholipase A1 activity; hydrolase activity; lipoprotein lipase activity; lipase activity
Cellular component	Golgi apparatus; extracellular region; cell surface; early endosome; extracellular space
Biological process	phospholipid homeostasis; positive regulation of cholesterol transport; positive regulation of high-density lipoprotein particle clearance; response to nutrient; lipid metabolism; lipid catabolic process; phospholipid catabolic process; cholesterol homeostasis; cell population proliferation; reverse cholesterol transport; regulation of lipoprotein metabolic process; high-density lipoprotein particle remodeling; fatty acid biosynthetic process; triglyceride catabolic process; very-low-density lipoprotein particle remodeling; triglyceride homeostasis
Sources:Amigo / QuickGO
Orthologs
Databases	NCBI: entry; OMA: entry
Species	Human	Mouse
Entrez	9388	16891
Ensembl	ENSG00000101670	ENSMUSG00000053846
UniProt	Q9Y5X9	Q9WVG5
RefSeq (mRNA)	NM_001308006; NM_006033	NM_010720
RefSeq (protein)	NP_001294935; NP_006024	NP_034850
Location (UCSC)	Chr 18: 49.56 – 49.6 Mb	Chr 18: 75.07 – 75.09 Mb
PubMed search
- Wikidata
View/Edit Human	View/Edit Mouse

Endothelial lipase (LIPG) is a form of lipase secreted by vascular endothelial cells in tissues with high metabolic rates and vascularization, such as the liver, lung, kidney, and thyroid gland. The LIPG enzyme is a vital component to many biological processes. These processes include lipoprotein metabolism, cytokine expression, and lipid composition in cells. Unlike the lipases that hydrolyze Triglycerides, endothelial lipase primarily hydrolyzes phospholipids. Due to the hydrolysis specificity, endothelial lipase contributes to multiple vital systems within the body. On the contrary to the beneficial roles that LIPG plays within the body, endothelial lipase is thought to play a potential role in cancer and inflammation. Knowledge obtained in vitro and in vivo suggest the relations to these conditions, but human interaction knowledge lacks due to the recent discovery of endothelial lipase. Endothelial lipase was first characterized in 1999. The two independent research groups which are notable for this discovery cloned the endothelial lipase gene and identified the novel lipase secreted from endothelial cells. The anti-Atherosclerosis opportunity through alleviating plaque blockage and prospective ability to raise High-density lipoprotein (HDL) have gained endothelial lipase recognition.

== Discovery ==
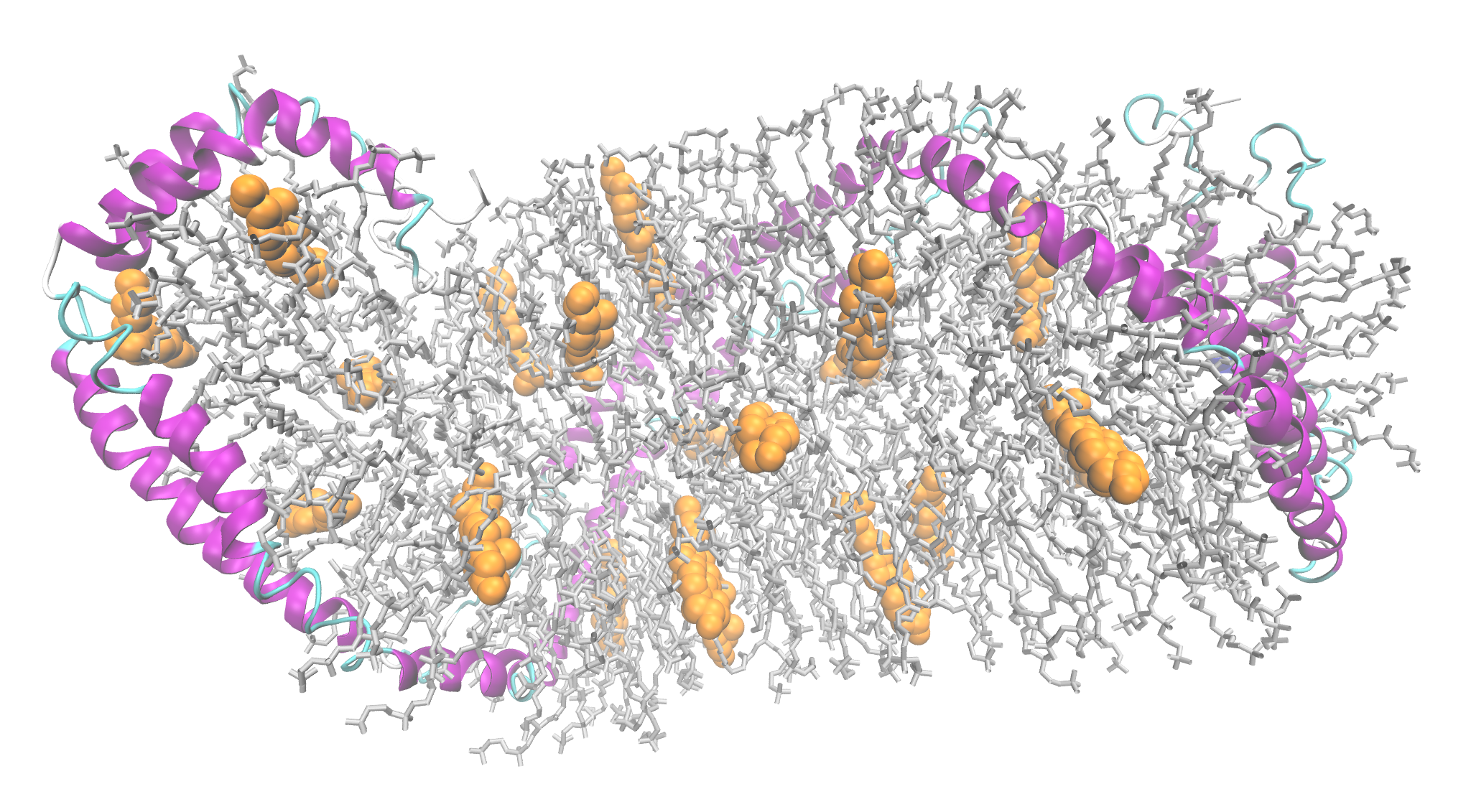
Phospholipids, cholesterol (orange spheres) and two apolipoprotein A-1 chains (pink ribbon) interaction

In 1999, the identification of endothelial lipase was independently discovered by two research groups.

The first group at Rhone-Poulenc Rorer cloned and characterized a new member of the triacylglycerol (TG) family. When this novel endothelial lipase was over-expressed in mice, the concentrations of HDL Cholesterol and apolipoprotein A-I in plasma decreased.

A second group at Stanford University independently cloned this same endothelial lipase from human umbilical vein endothelial cells, human coronary artery endothelial cells and rodent endothelial-like yolk sacs. Suppression subtractive hybridization was used to isolate the genes. The genes were then compared and aligned. Two cDNA fragments expressed the lipase gene and endothelial properties. Northern blot analysis documented the samples. The suggested relation to metabolism and vascular disease was attributed to tissue selective expression in endothelial cells.

== Structure ==
Endothelial lipase is a protein that belongs triglyceride lipase category. This protein is encoded by the LIPG gene. Endothelial lipase is distinct from other lipases in being secreted from vascular endothelial cells. While lipoprotein lipase is also found on endothelial cells, it is first secreted from nearby cells such as adipocytes, and then transported to the capillary lumen. The primary secretion of endothelial lipase is that of a 55kDa protein which is secreted to a 68kDa protein after post-translational Glycosylation. LIPG functions as it binds to Proteoglycans. LIPG also has the potential for additional cleavage. The additional cleavage would result in inactivity of the 40 kDa protein N-terminal 40 kDa and 28 kDa C-terminal. LIPG has the capability to form a protein dimer prior to secretion which causes dimerization to appear. The addition reaction of the same compound and molecules enhances the resistance to cleavage and limited activity is sustained.

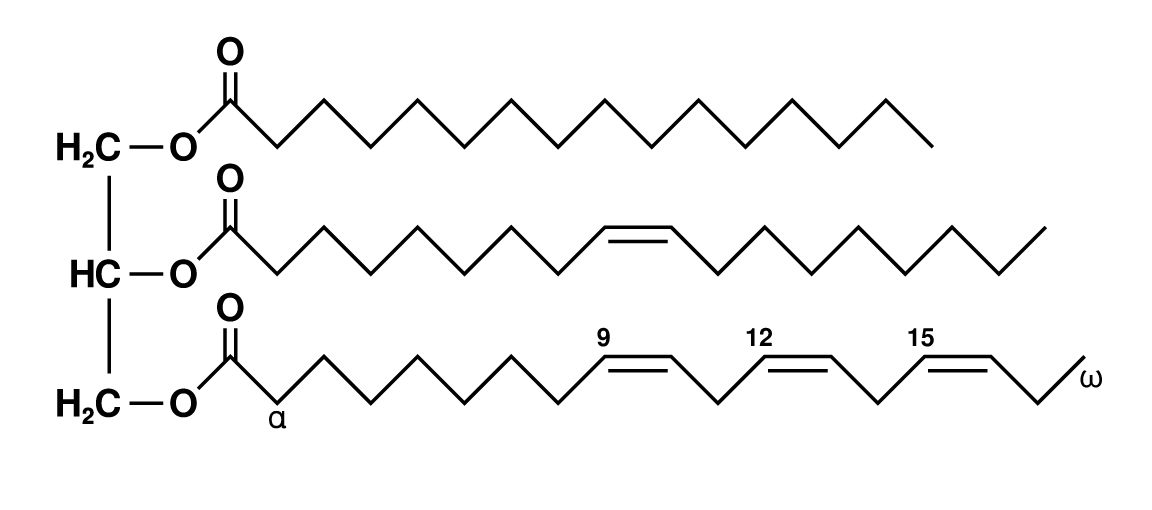
Triglyceride Structure

== Function ==
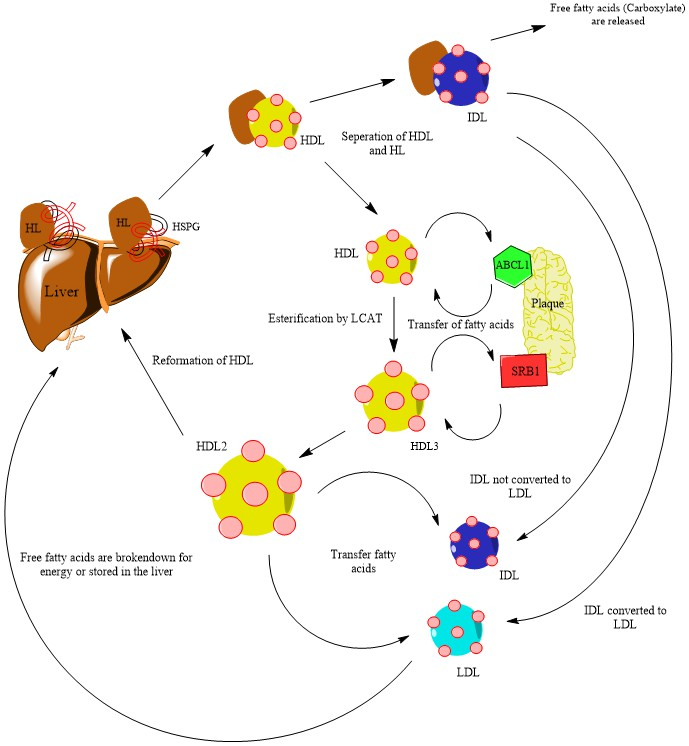
Lipid Metabolism

=== Metabolism ===
The site of endothelial lipase enzymatic activity is the surface of endothelial cells. LIPG regulates lipoprotein metabolism through the hydrolysis of HDL phospholipids. This high-density lipoprotein is an amphipathic lipid, meaning the lipid is composed of both a hydrophobic and a hydrophilic component. Cholesterol has a four-ring structure and is an isoprenoid-based hydrocarbon. Although cholesterol lacks the phosphate head group, cholesterol's hydroxyl component interacts with water, categorizing cholesterol as amphipathic. HDL cholesterol provides extreme benefits to the body and is vital in sustaining the fluidity of natural membranes. HDL cholesterol must be maintained at a certain level to ensure normal cell growth and reproduction. The HDL capability of absorption of cholesterol and transport to the liver, aids in the removal of cholesterol in the body. On the contrary, Low-density lipoprotein (LDL) cholesterol works in opposition. LDL cholesterol does not transport cholesterol out of the body but rather serves as a foundation for cholesterol buildup. LDL should be kept low in the body to avoid cholesterol buildup in arteries. When HDL are hydrolyzed, the turnover rate of HDL increases and cholesterol levels in plasma decrease. This hydrolysis allows for the acceleration or continuation of cholesterol removal from the body to avoid a buildup. Following the hydrolysis of HDL, free fatty acid lipid precursors are taken up. These lipids are then utilized in other phospholipid catabolism. In summation, endothelial lipase is said to be a pivotal component in metabolism through high-density lipoprotein hydrolysis.

=== Vascular biology ===
Endothelial lipase is linked to potential treatment and improvement of atherosclerosis. Atherosclerosis is a vascular disease which is caused by arterial plaque buildup. Cholesterol, fat, calcium, and other components contribute to the formation of plaque in the blood. Plaque is detrimental to vascular heath because it narrows and stiffens the arteries, causing a lack of oxygen-rich blood flow. HDL increase serves as a treatment for atherosclerosis. The hydrolysis of HDL leads to the transportation of cholesterol to the liver. The filtration system of the liver aids in the removal of cholesterol from the body. Therefore, the cholesterol level in the plasma will decrease. Thus, endothelial lipase synthesis of HDL could provide an adequate opportunity to increase HDL levels. Data suggests that endothelial lipase inhibition should increase the plasma HDL, primarily in patients with low HDL-C levels. An increased risk of atherosclerosis is associated with low levels of HDL. Although a functional correlation can be drawn, there is little clinical evidence to provide support to the suggested potential benefits in vascular pathophysiology.
