= Bile salt-dependent lipase =

Mammalian protein found in Homo sapiens

CEL
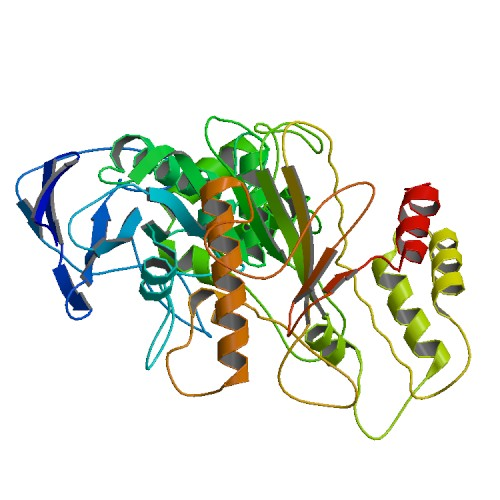

Identifiers
- Aliases: CEL, BAL, BSDL, BSSL, CELL, CEase, FAP, FAPP, LIPA, MODY8, Bile salt-dependent lipase, carboxyl ester lipase
- External IDs: OMIM: 114840; MGI: 88374; GeneCards: CEL
Available structures
PDB	Ortholog search: PDBe RCSB
PDB	List of PDB id codes 1F6W, 1JMY
Enzyme activity
EC #	BRENDA	ExPASy	KEGG	MetaCyc
3.1.1.3	↗	↗	↗	↗
3.1.1.6	↗	↗	↗	↗
3.1.1.13	↗	↗	↗	↗

Gene location (Human)
Chr.	Chromosome 9 (human)
Band	9q34.13	Start	133,061,981 bp
Band	9q34.13	End	133,071,861 bp

Gene location (Mouse)
Chr.	Chromosome 2 (mouse)
Band	2 A3|2 19.38 cM	Start	28,445,807 bp
Band	2 A3|2 19.38 cM	End	28,453,415 bp
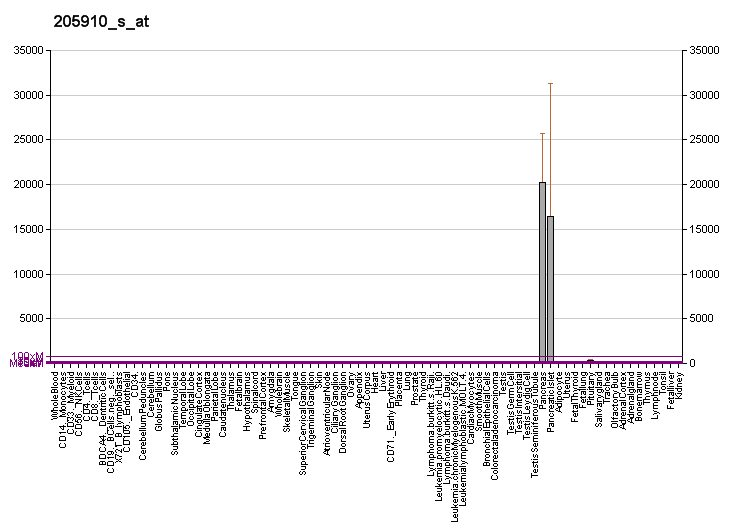

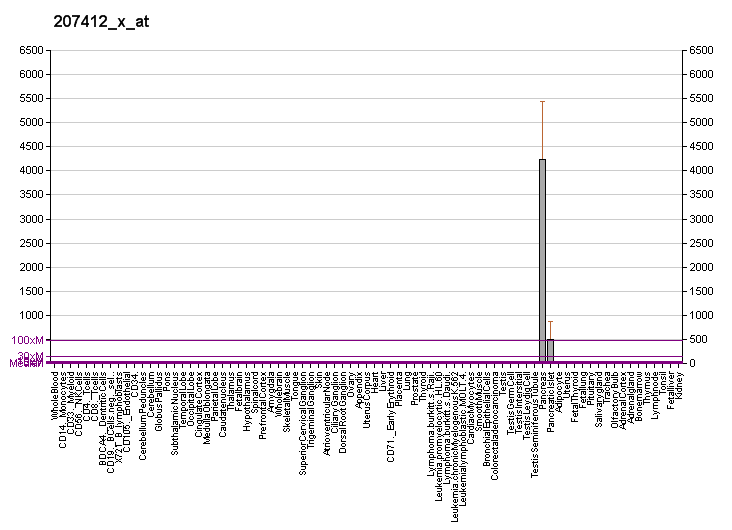
RNA expression pattern
Bgee	Human / Mouse (ortholog); Top expressed in: body of pancreas; beta cell; pituitary gland; anterior pituitary; corpus epididymis; caput epididymis; duodenum; right hemisphere of cerebellum; right uterine tube; paraflocculus of cerebellum / Top expressed in: pyloric antrum; islet of Langerhans; lactiferous gland; epithelium of stomach; duodenum; sexually immature organism; mucous cell of stomach; migratory enteric neural crest cell; embryo; tracheobronchial tree; More reference expression data
BioGPS	More reference expression data
Gene ontology
Molecular function	heparin binding; acylglycerol lipase activity; catalytic activity; protein binding; hydrolase activity; hydrolase activity, acting on ester bonds; carboxylic ester hydrolase activity; triglyceride lipase activity; sterol esterase activity; signaling receptor activity; neurexin family protein binding
Cellular component	cytoplasm; extracellular region; extracellular exosome; extracellular space; integral component of plasma membrane; cell surface; synapse; presynapse
Biological process	fatty acid catabolic process; lipid digestion; protein esterification; lipid metabolism; cholesterol catabolic process; pancreatic juice secretion; intestinal lipid catabolic process; lipid catabolic process; intestinal cholesterol absorption; triglyceride metabolic process; neuron cell-cell adhesion; synaptic vesicle endocytosis; modulation of chemical synaptic transmission; postsynaptic membrane assembly; presynaptic membrane assembly
Sources:Amigo / QuickGO
Orthologs
Databases	NCBI: entry; OMA: entry
Species	Human	Mouse
Entrez	1056	12613
Ensembl	ENSG00000170835	ENSMUSG00000026818
UniProt	P19835	Q64285
RefSeq (mRNA)	NM_001807	NM_009885
RefSeq (protein)	NP_001798	NP_034015
Location (UCSC)	Chr 9: 133.06 – 133.07 Mb	Chr 2: 28.45 – 28.45 Mb
PubMed search
- Wikidata
View/Edit Human	View/Edit Mouse

Bile salt-dependent lipase (or BSDL), also known as carboxyl ester lipase is an enzyme that in humans is encoded by the gene CEL. It is produced by the acinar cells of the adult pancreas and aids in the digestion of fats. Bile salt-stimulated lipase (or BSSL) is an equivalent enzyme found within breast milk. BSDL has been found in the pancreatic secretions of all species in which it has been looked for. BSSL, originally discovered in the milk of humans and various other primates, has since been found in the milk of many animals including dogs, cats, rats, and rabbits.

== Enzymatic activity ==
More than 95% of the fat present in human milk and in infant formulas is in the form of triacylglycerols (TG). In adults, TGs are thought to be broken down or hydrolyzed mainly by the colipase-dependent enzyme called pancreatic lipase. In the newborn, CDL activity in the duodenum is lower than in adults.

Both BSDL and BSSL have a broad substrate specificity and, like CDL, are capable of hydrolyzing triacylglycerides (in addition to phospholipids, esters of cholesterol, and lipid-soluble vitamins). In particular, they can hydrolyze esters of the essential fatty acids (n-3 and n-6 PUFAs) and DHA. BSDL production in the newborn pancreas is quite low when compared with production in the mammary gland or adult pancreas.

However, newborn infants absorb lipids relatively well, considering the low level of CDL and BSDL they produce. This observation has led to the suggestion that BSDL produced by lactating mammary gland and present within milk, may compensate for the low levels of other TG-digesting enzymes and aid newborns in lipid absorption. The importance of BSSL in breast milk for the preterm infant nutrition was suggested at 2007. It was also directly shown recently.
