= Lipoprotein lipase =

Mammalian protein found in Homo sapiens

LPL

Identifiers
- Aliases: LPL, HDLCQ11, LIPD, lipoprotein lipase
- External IDs: OMIM: 609708; MGI: 96820; GeneCards: LPL
Enzyme activity
| EC # | BRENDA | ExPASy | KEGG | MetaCyc |
|---|---|---|---|---|
| 3.1.1.32 | ↗ | ↗ | ↗ | ↗ |
| 3.1.1.34 | ↗ | ↗ | ↗ | ↗ |

Gene location (Human)
| Chr. | Chromosome 8 (human) |
| Band | 8p21.3 | Start | 19,901,717 bp |
| Band | 8p21.3 | End | 19,967,259 bp |

Gene location (Mouse)
| Chr. | Chromosome 8 (mouse) |
| Band | 8 B3.3|8 33.88 cM | Start | 69,333,143 bp |
| Band | 8 B3.3|8 33.88 cM | End | 69,360,100 bp |
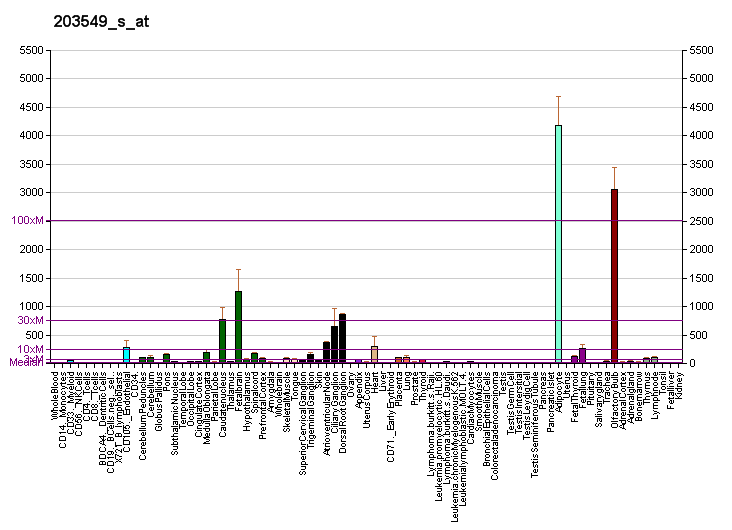

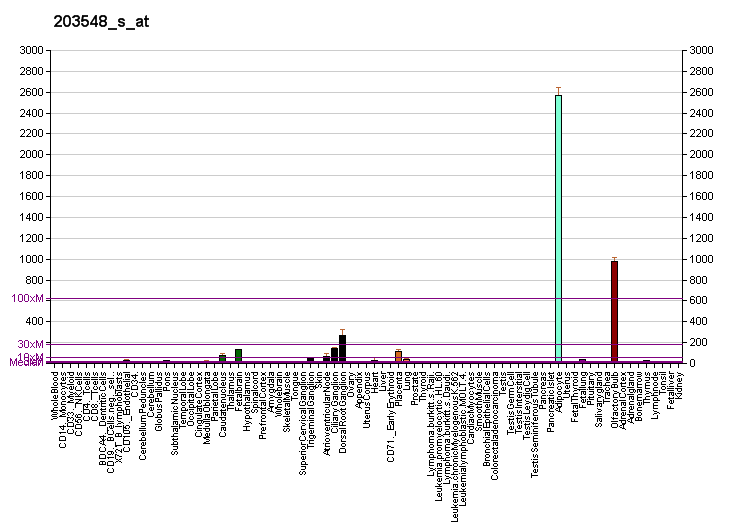
RNA expression pattern
| Bgee | Human / Mouse (ortholog); Top expressed in: olfactory bulb; trigeminal ganglion; right ventricle; spinal ganglia; myocardium of left ventricle; adipose tissue; abdominal fat; subcutaneous adipose tissue; apex of heart; tibial nerve / Top expressed in: tunica adventitia of aorta; white adipose tissue; subcutaneous adipose tissue; right ventricle; myocardium of ventricle; cardiac muscles; brown adipose tissue; intercostal muscle; cardiac muscle tissue of left ventricle; digastric muscle; More reference expression data |
| BioGPS | More reference expression data |
Gene ontology
| Molecular function | triglyceride binding; apolipoprotein binding; heparin binding; lipoprotein lipase activity; triglyceride lipase activity; phospholipase activity; carboxylic ester hydrolase activity; protein binding; signaling receptor binding; hydrolase activity |
| Cellular component | membrane; extracellular matrix; chylomicron; plasma membrane; very-low-density lipoprotein particle; extracellular region; cell surface; anchored component of membrane; extracellular exosome; extracellular space |
| Biological process | positive regulation of inflammatory response; lipid metabolism; positive regulation of cholesterol storage; response to glucose; retinoid metabolic process; triglyceride catabolic process; lipid catabolic process; positive regulation of macrophage derived foam cell differentiation; positive regulation of sequestering of triglyceride; fatty acid biosynthetic process; very-low-density lipoprotein particle remodeling; response to cold; phospholipid metabolic process; cholesterol homeostasis; triglyceride metabolic process; triglyceride homeostasis; triglyceride biosynthetic process; low-density lipoprotein particle mediated signaling; chylomicron remodeling; regulation of lipoprotein lipase activity; response to bacterium; negative regulation of cellular response to insulin stimulus |
Sources:Amigo / QuickGO
Orthologs
| Databases | NCBI: entry; OMA: entry |
| Species | Human | Mouse |
| Entrez | 4023 | 16956 |
| Ensembl | ENSG00000175445 | ENSMUSG00000015568 |
| UniProt | P06858 | P11152 |
| RefSeq (mRNA) | NM_000237 | NM_008509 |
| RefSeq (protein) | NP_000228 | NP_032535 |
| Location (UCSC) | Chr 8: 19.9 – 19.97 Mb | Chr 8: 69.33 – 69.36 Mb |
| PubMed search |
- Wikidata
| View/Edit Human | View/Edit Mouse |

Lipoprotein lipase

Identifiers
- EC no.: 3.1.1.34
- CAS no.: 9004-02-8

Databases
- BRENDA: enzyme data
- ExPASy: NiceZyme view
- KEGG: enzyme entry
- MetaCyc: metabolic pathway
- Rhea: reactions
- PDB structures: RCSB PDB PDBe PDBsum
- Gene Ontology: AmiGO / QuickGO
Search
- PMC: articles
- PubMed: articles
- NCBI: proteins

Lipoprotein lipase (LPL) (EC 3.1.1.34, systematic name triacylglycerol acylhydrolase (lipoprotein-dependent)) is a member of the lipase gene family, which includes pancreatic lipase, hepatic lipase, and endothelial lipase. It is a water-soluble enzyme that hydrolyzes triglycerides in lipoproteins, such as those found in chylomicrons and very low-density lipoproteins (VLDL), into two free fatty acids and one monoacylglycerol molecule:

triacylglycerol + H_{2}O = diacylglycerol + a carboxylate

It is also involved in promoting the cellular uptake of chylomicron remnants, cholesterol-rich lipoproteins, and free fatty acids. LPL requires ApoC-II as a cofactor.

LPL is attached to the luminal surface of endothelial cells in capillaries by the protein glycosylphosphatidylinositol HDL-binding protein 1 (GPIHBP1) and by heparan sulfated peptidoglycans. It is most widely distributed in adipose, heart, and skeletal muscle tissue, as well as in lactating mammary glands.

== Synthesis ==
In brief, LPL is secreted from heart, muscle and adipose parenchymal cells as a glycosylated homodimer, after which it is translocated through the extracellular matrix and across endothelial cells to the capillary lumen. After translation, the newly synthesized protein is glycosylated in the endoplasmic reticulum. The glycosylation sites of LPL are Asn-43, Asn-257, and Asn-359. Glucosidases then remove terminal glucose residues; it was once believed that this glucose trimming is responsible for the conformational change needed for LPL to form homodimers and become catalytically active. In the Golgi apparatus, the oligosaccharides are further altered to result in either two complex chains, or two complex and one high-mannose chain. In the final protein, carbohydrates account for about 12% of the molecular mass (55-58 kDa).

Homodimerization is required before LPL can be secreted from cells. After secretion, LPL is carried across endothelial cells and presented into the capillary lumen by the protein glycosylphosphatidylinositol-anchored high-density lipoprotein-binding protein 1.

== Structure ==
Crystal structures of LPL complexed with GPIHBP1 have been reported. LPL is composed of two distinct regions: the larger N-terminus domain that contains the lipolytic active site, and the smaller C-terminus domain. These two regions are attached by a peptide linker. The N-terminus domain has an α/β hydrolase fold, which is a globular structure containing a central β sheet surrounded by α helices. The C-terminus domain is a β sandwich formed by two β sheet layers, and resembles an elongated cylinder.

== Mechanism ==
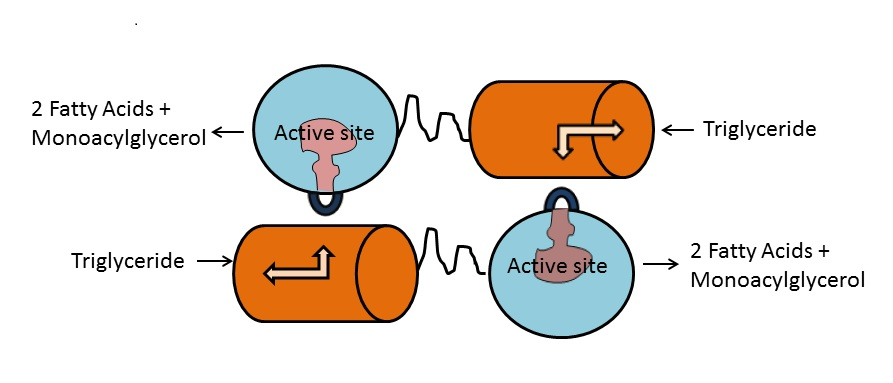
Image 1: The proposed LPL homodimer structure; N-terminal domains in blue, C-terminal domains in orange. Lid region blocking the active site is shown in dark blue. Triglyceride binds to the C-terminal domain and the lid region, inducing a conformation change in LPL to make the active site accessible.

The active site of LPL is composed of the conserved Ser-132, Asp-156, and His-241 triad. Other important regions of the N-terminal domain for catalysis includes an oxyanion hole (Trp-55, Leu-133), a lid region (residues 216-239), as well as a β5 loop (residues 54-64). The ApoC-II binding site is currently unknown, but it is predicted that residues on both N-and C-terminal domains are necessary for this interaction to occur. The C-terminal domain appears to confer LPL's substrate specificity; it has a higher affinity for large triacylglyceride-rich lipoproteins than cholesterol-rich lipoproteins. The C-terminal domain is also important for binding to LDL's receptors. Both the N-and C-terminal domains contain heparin binding sites distal to the lipid binding sites; LPL therefore serves as a bridge between the cell surface and lipoproteins. Importantly, LPL binding to the cell surface or receptors is not dependent on its catalytic activity.

The LPL non-covalent homodimer has a head-to-tail arrangement of the monomers. The Ser/Asp/His triad is in a hydrophobic groove that is blocked from solvent by the lid. Upon binding to ApoC-II and lipid in the lipoprotein, the C-terminal domain presents the lipid substrate to the lid region. The lipid interacts with both the lid region and the hydrophobic groove at the active site; this causes the lid to move, providing access to the active site. The β5 loop folds back into the protein core, bringing one of the electrophiles of the oxyanion hole into position for lipolysis. The glycerol backbone of the lipid is then able to enter the active site and is hydrolyzed.

Two molecules of ApoC-II can attach to each LPL dimer. It is estimated that up to forty LPL dimers may act simultaneously on a single lipoprotein. In regard to kinetics, it is believed that release of product into circulation is the rate-limiting step in the reaction.

== Function ==
LPL gene encodes lipoprotein lipase, which is expressed in the heart, muscle, and adipose tissue. LPL functions as a homodimer, and has the dual functions of triglyceride hydrolase and ligand/bridging factor for receptor-mediated lipoprotein uptake. Through catalysis, VLDL is converted to IDL and then to LDL. Severe mutations that cause LPL deficiency result in type I hyperlipoproteinemia, while less extreme mutations in LPL are linked to many disorders of lipoprotein metabolism.

== Regulation ==
LPL is controlled transcriptionally and posttranscriptionally. The circadian clock may be important in the control of Lpl mRNA levels in peripheral tissues.

LPL isozymes are regulated differently depending on the tissue. For example, insulin is known to activate LPL in adipocytes and its placement in the capillary endothelium. By contrast, insulin has been shown to decrease expression of muscle LPL. Muscle and myocardial LPL is instead activated by glucagon and adrenaline. This helps to explain why during fasting, LPL activity increases in muscle tissue and decreases in adipose tissue, whereas after a meal, the opposite occurs.

Consistent with this, dietary macronutrients differentially affect adipose and muscle LPL activity. After 16 days on a high-carbohydrate or a high-fat diet, LPL activity increased significantly in both tissues 6 hours after a meal of either composition, but there was a significantly greater rise in adipose tissue LPL in response to the high-carbohydrate diet compared to the high-fat diet. There was no difference between the two diets' effects on insulin sensitivity or fasting LPL activity in either tissue.

The concentration of LPL displayed on endothelial cell surface cannot be regulated by endothelial cells, as they neither synthesize nor degrade LPL. Instead, this regulation occurs by managing the flux of LPL arriving at the lipolytic site and by regulating the activity of LPL present on the endothelium. A key protein involved in controlling the activity of LPL is ANGPTL4, which serves as a local inhibitor of LPL. Induction of ANGPTL4 accounts for the inhibition of LPL activity in white adipose tissue during fasting. Growing evidence implicates ANGPTL4 in the physiological regulation of LPL activity in a variety of tissues.

An ANGPTL3-4-8 model was proposed to explain the variations of LPL activity during the fed-fast cycle. Specifically, feeding induces ANGPTL8, activating the ANGPTL8–ANGPTL3 pathway, which inhibits LPL in cardiac and skeletal muscles, thereby making circulating triglycerides available for uptake by white adipose tissue, in which LPL activity is elevated owing to diminished ANGPTL4; the reverse is true during fasting, which suppresses ANGPTL8 but induces ANGPTL4, thereby directing triglycerides to muscles. The model suggests a general framework for how triglyceride trafficking is regulated.

== Clinical significance ==
Lipoprotein lipase deficiency leads to hypertriglyceridemia (elevated levels of triglycerides in the bloodstream). In mice, overexpression of LPL has been shown to cause insulin resistance, and to promote obesity.

A high adipose tissue LPL response to a high-carbohydrate diet may predispose toward fat gain. One study reported that subjects gained more body fat over the next four years if, after following a high-carbohydrate diet and partaking of a high-carbohydrate meal, they responded with an increase in adipose tissue LPL activity per adipocyte, or a decrease in skeletal muscle LPL activity per gram of tissue.

LPL expression has been shown to be a prognostic predictor in Chronic lymphocytic leukemia. In this haematological disorder, LPL appears to provide fatty acids as an energy source to malignant cells. Thus, elevated levels of LPL mRNA or protein are considered to be indicators of poor prognosis.

== Interactions ==
Lipoprotein lipase has been shown to interact with LRP1. It is also a ligand for α2M, GP330, and VLDL receptors. LPL has been shown to be a ligand for LRP2, albeit at a lower affinity than for other receptors; however, most of the LPL-dependent VLDL degradation can be attributed to the LRP2 pathway. In each case, LPL serves as a bridge between receptor and lipoprotein. While LPL is activated by ApoC-II, it is inhibited by ApoCIII.

== In other organisms ==
The LPL gene is highly conserved across vertebrates. Lipoprotein lipase is involved in lipid transport in the placentae of live bearing lizards (Pseudemoia entrecasteauxii).

== Interactive pathway map ==
Click on genes, proteins and metabolites below to link to respective articles. (Note: The interactive pathway map can be edited at WikiPathways: "Statin_Pathway_WP430".)

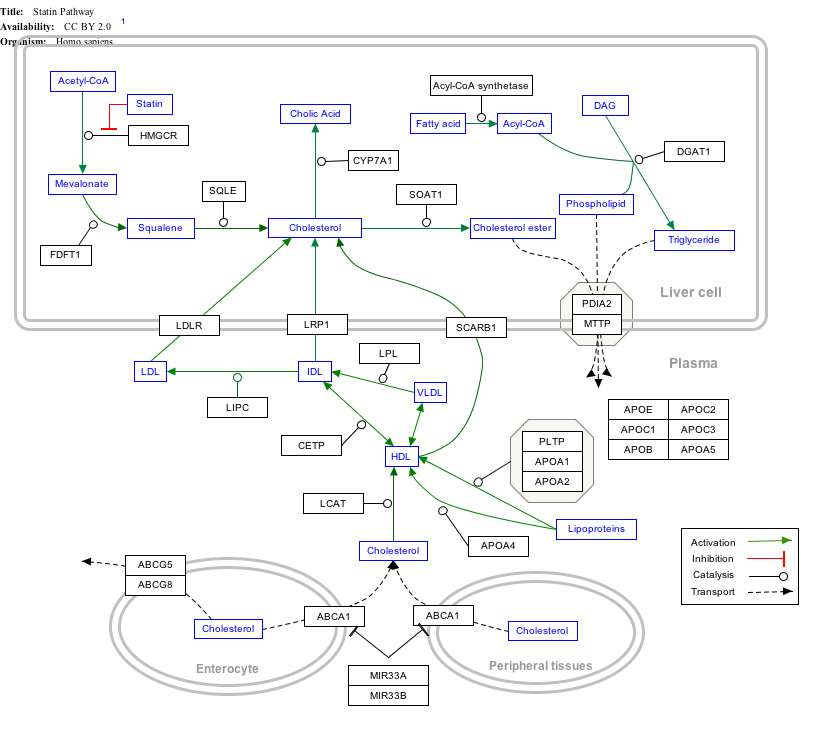

Statin pathway edit
