= Outer membrane phospholipase A1 =

Class of enzymes

Phospholipase A1
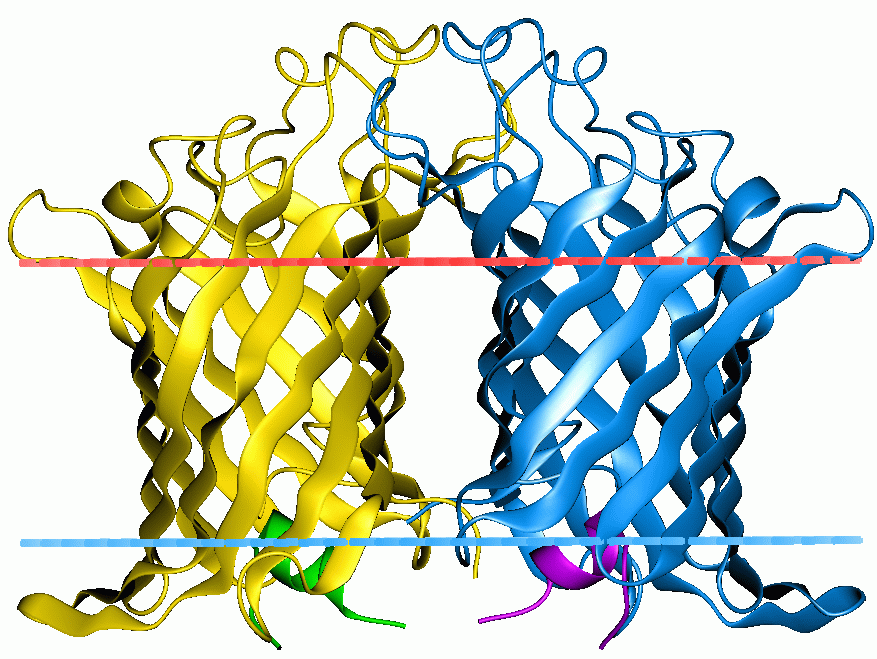

Identifiers
- Symbol: PLA1
- Pfam: PF02253
- InterPro: IPR003187
- SCOP2: 1qd6 / SCOPe / SUPFAM
- OPM superfamily: 29
- OPM protein: 1qd6
- CDD: cd00541
Available protein structures:
- PDB: IPR003187 PF02253 (ECOD; PDBsum)
- AlphaFold: IPR003187; PF02253

Outer membrane phospholipase A1 (OMPLA) is an acyl hydrolase with a broad substrate specificity (EC:3.1.1.32.) from the bacterial outer membrane. It has been proposed that Ser164 is the active site of the protein (UniProt P00631)

This integral membrane phospholipase was found in many Gram-negative bacteria and has a broad substrate specificity EC 3.1.1.32. The role of OMPLA has been most thoroughly studied in Escherichia coli, where it participates in the secretion of bacteriocins. Bacteriocin release is triggered by a lysis protein (bacteriocin release protein or BRP), followed by a phospholipase dependent accumulation of lysophospholipids and free fatty acids in the outer membrane. The reaction products enhance the permeability of the outer membrane, which allows the semispecific secretion of bacteriocins. One speculative function of OMPLA is related to organic solvent tolerance in bacteria.

Structurally, it consists of a 12-stranded antiparallel beta-barrel with a convex and a flat side. The active site residues are exposed on the exterior of the flat face of the beta-barrel. The activity of the enzyme is regulated by reversible dimerisation. Dimer interactions occur exclusively in the membrane-embedded parts of the flat side of the beta-barrel, with polar residues embedded in an apolar environment forming the key interactions. The active site His and Ser residues are located at the exterior of the beta-barrel, at the outer leaflet side of the membrane. This location indicates that under normal conditions the substrate and the active site are physically separated, since in E. coli phospholipids are exclusively located in the inner leaflet of the outer membrane.
