= Lipase member H =

Protein-coding gene in the species Homo sapiens

LIPH

Identifiers
- Aliases: LIPH, AH, ARWH2, HYPT7, LAH2, LPDLR, PLA1B, mPA-PLA1, lipase H
- External IDs: OMIM: 607365; MGI: 2388029; GeneCards: LIPH

Gene location (Human)
| Chr. | Chromosome 3 (human) |
| Band | 3q27.2 | Start | 185,506,262 bp |
| Band | 3q27.2 | End | 185,552,588 bp |

Gene location (Mouse)
| Chr. | Chromosome 16 (mouse) |
| Band | 16 B1|16 12.95 cM | Start | 21,772,567 bp |
| Band | 16 B1|16 12.95 cM | End | 21,814,413 bp |
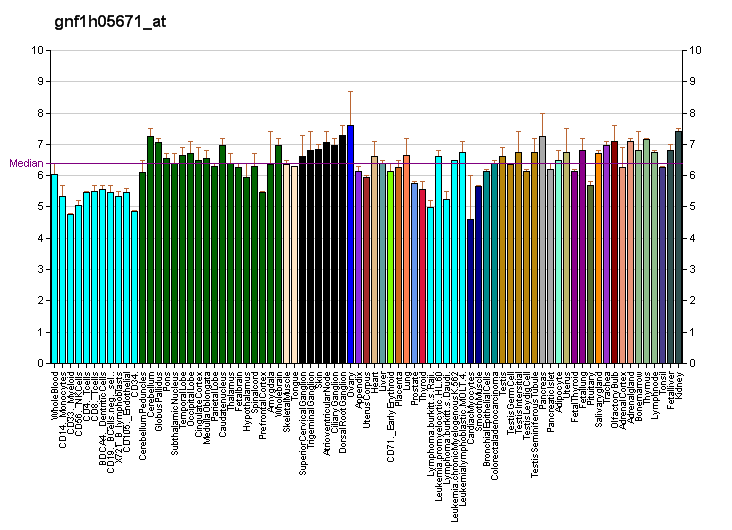
RNA expression pattern
| Bgee | Human / Mouse (ortholog); Top expressed in: buccal mucosa cell; rectum; pancreatic ductal cell; mucosa of transverse colon; islet of Langerhans; olfactory zone of nasal mucosa; nasal epithelium; epithelium of nasopharynx; mucosa of ileum; mucosa of sigmoid colon / Top expressed in: epithelium of stomach; transitional epithelium of urinary bladder; lobe of prostate; duodenum; vestibular membrane of cochlear duct; otolith organ; ileum; utricle; right lung lobe; left colon; More reference expression data |
| BioGPS | More reference expression data |
Gene ontology
| Molecular function | heparin binding; carboxylic ester hydrolase activity; hydrolase activity; phospholipase activity; lipase activity |
| Cellular component | extracellular region; plasma membrane; membrane; extracellular space |
| Biological process | lipid catabolic process; lipid metabolism; phosphatidic acid biosynthetic process |
Sources:Amigo / QuickGO
Orthologs
| Databases | NCBI: entry; OMA: entry |
| Species | Human | Mouse |
| Entrez | 200879 | 239759 |
| Ensembl | ENSG00000163898 | ENSMUSG00000044626 |
| UniProt | Q8WWY8 | Q8CIV3 |
| RefSeq (mRNA) | NM_139248 | NM_001083894; NM_001289581; NM_001289582; NM_153404 |
| RefSeq (protein) | NP_640341 | NP_001077363; NP_001276510; NP_001276511; NP_700453 |
| Location (UCSC) | Chr 3: 185.51 – 185.55 Mb | Chr 16: 21.77 – 21.81 Mb |
| PubMed search |
- Wikidata
| View/Edit Human | View/Edit Mouse |

Lipase member H is an enzyme that in humans is encoded by the LIPH gene. Also sometimes called Phosphatidic acid-specific PLA1β, this enzyme functions as a phospholipase that specifically acts on phosphatidic acid, producing the signaling molecule 2-acyl lysophosphatidic acid (LPA). LPA is a lipid mediator with diverse biological properties that include platelet aggregation, smooth muscle contraction, and stimulation of cell proliferation and motility.
