= Periannan Senapathy =

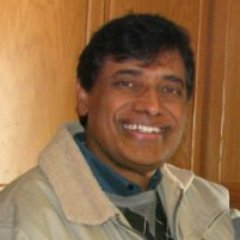
- Born: Namakkal, Tamil Nadu, India
- Education: Loyola College; Madras University; Indian Institute of Science
- Known for: Genomics; Clinical Genomics; RNA Splicing; Split genes
- Scientific career
- Workplaces: National Institutes of Health; University of Wisconsin, Madison
- Website: Genome International Corporation

Periannan Senapathy is a molecular biologist, geneticist, author and entrepreneur. He is the founder and president of Genome International Corporation, a biotechnology firm based in Madison, Wisconsin, which develops clinical decision support systems for analyzing patient genome data to aid in diagnosis and treatment of diseases.

Senapathy is known for his contributions in genetics, genomics and clinical genomics, especially in the biology of RNA splicing and the split structure of eukaryotic genes. He developed the Shapiro & Senapathy algorithm (S&S) for predicting the splice sites in eukaryotic genes, which has become a primary methodology for discovering disease-causing splice site mutations. The S&S algorithm has been implemented in many gene-finding and mutation detection tools that are used in clinical and research institutions for uncovering mutations in patients with numerous diseases, including cancers and inherited disorders. It is increasingly used in the Next Generation Sequencing era, as it is widely realized that over 60% of all diseases and adverse drug reactions occur within the splicing regions of genes. The S&S algorithm has been cited in ~6,000 publications that analyze splicing mutations in cancer and inherited disorders.

Senapathy proposed the "split gene theory," which suggests that the split structure of eukaryotic genes originated from random DNA sequences, and provided tangible evidence from the genome sequences of several organisms. He also showed that the splice junctions of eukaryotic genes could have originated from the stop codon ends of the Open Reading Frames (ORFs) in random DNA sequences. Marshall Nirenberg, the Nobel Laureate who deciphered the genetic code, communicated Senapathy's article on the origin of introns to PNAS. Senapathy has published his other scientific findings in journals including Science, Nucleic Acids Research, PNAS, Journal of Biological Chemistry, and Journal of Molecular Biology, and is the author of several patents in the genomics field.

== Biography ==
Senapathy has a Ph.D. in molecular biology from the Indian Institute of Science, Bangalore, India. He spent twelve years in genome research for the National Institutes of Health's Laboratory of Molecular and Cell Biology and the Laboratory of Statistical and Mathematical Methodology in the Division of Computer Research and Technology in Bethesda, Maryland (1980–87), and the Biotechnology Center and the Department of Genetics of the University of Wisconsin, Madison (1987–91). Senapathy founded Genome International in 1992 for developing computational biology research, products and services.

== Notable research contributions ==
Senapathy has provided major contributions in RNA splicing biology, improving the understanding of the structure, function, and origin of eukaryotic split genes, and the applications of these findings in human medicine. His work has helped the diagnosis and treatment of patients with hundreds of diseases including cancers and inherited disorders. His research is an example of the application of basic molecular biology research findings to human medicine, and a variety of practical applications in animals and plants.

=== Origin of split genes from random DNA sequences ===
The split gene theory answers major questions of why and how the split genes of eukaryotes originated. It states that if coding sequences for biological proteins originated from random primordial genetic sequences, the random occurrence of the 3 stop codons out of 64 codons would limit the open reading frames (ORFs) to a very short length of ~60 bases. Thus, coding sequences for biological proteins with average lengths of ~1,200 bases, and long coding sequences of 6,000 bases, can practically never occur in random sequences. Thus, genes had to occur in pieces in a split form, with short coding sequences (ORFs) that became exons, interrupted by very long random sequences that became introns. When the eukaryotic DNA was tested for ORF length distribution, it exactly matched that from random DNA, with very short ORFs that matched the lengths of exons, and very long introns as predicted, supporting the split gene theory. Thus, introns are relics left over from their random sequence origin, and thus are earmarked to be removed at the primary RNA stage, although incidentally they may have few genetic elements useful to the cell. The Nobel Laureate Marshall Nirenberg, who deciphered the codons, communicated the paper to the PNAS. New Scientist covered this publication titled "A long explanation for introns".

Noted molecular biologist and biophysicist Colin Blake from the Laboratory of Molecular Biophysics and Oxford Centre for Molecular Sciences, University of Oxford, commented on Senapathy's theory that: "Recent work by Senapathy, when applied to RNA, comprehensively explains the origin of the segregated form of RNA into coding and non-coding regions. It also suggests why a splicing mechanism was developed at the start of primordial evolution. The presence of random sequence was therefore sufficient to create in the primordial ancestor the segregated form of RNA observed in the eukaryotic gene structure."

=== Origin of RNA splice junction signals from stop codons of ORFs ===
Senapathy's research also elucidates the origin of the splice junctions of eukaryotic genes, again the major questions of why and how the splice junction signals originated. Senapathy predicted that, if the split gene theory was true, the ends of these ORFs that had a stop codon would have become the ends of exons that would occur within introns, and that would define the splice junctions. Senapathy found that almost all splice junctions in eukaryotic genes contained stop codons exactly at the ends of introns, bordering the exons as predicted. In fact, these stop codons were found to form the "canonical" AG:GT splicing sequence, with the three stop codons occurring as part of the strong consensus signals. Senapathy had observed that mutations in these stop codon bases within splice junctions were the cause of the majority of diseases caused by splicing mutations, emphasizing the importance of stop codons in the splice junctions. Thus, the basic split gene theory led to the hypothesis that the splice junctions originated from the stop codons. Marshall Nirenberg supported the publication of this paper in the PNAS. New Scientist covered this publication titled "Exons, Introns and Evolution".

=== Why exons are short and introns are long ===
Research based on the split gene theory sheds lights on other basic questions of exons and introns. The exons of eukaryotes are generally short (human exons average ~120 bases, and can be as short as 10 bases) and introns are usually very long (average of ~3,000 bases, and can be several hundred thousands bases long), for example genes RBFOX1, CNTNAP2, PTPRD and DLG2. Senapathy has provided an answer for why exons are short and introns are long. Based on the split gene theory, exons of eukaryotic genes, if they originated from random DNA sequences, have to match the lengths of ORFs from random sequence, and possibly should be around 100 bases (close to the median length of ORFs in random sequence). The genome sequences of living organisms, for example the human, exhibits exactly the same average lengths of 120 bases for exons, and the longest exons of 600 bases (with few exceptions), which is the same length as that of the longest random ORFs. In addition, the introns can be very long, based on the split gene theory, which is found to be true in eukaryotic organisms.

=== Why genomes are large ===
This work also explains why the genomes are very large, for example, the human genome with three billion bases, and why only a very small fraction of the human genome (~2%) codes for the proteins and other regulatory elements. If split genes originated from random primordial DNA sequences, it would contain a significant amount of DNA that would be represented by introns. Furthermore, a genome assembled from random DNA containing split genes would also include intergenic random DNA. Thus, the nascent genomes that originated from random DNA sequences had to be large, regardless of the complexity of the organism. Furthermore, the findings that the genomes of several organisms are smaller, although they contain essentially the same number of genes as that of the human, such as those of the C. elegans (genome size ~100 million bases, ~19,000 genes) and Arabidopsis (genome size ~125 million bases, ~25,000 genes), adds support to this theory. The split gene theory predicts that the introns in the split genes in these genomes could be the "reduced" (or deleted) form compared to the larger genes with long introns, thus leading to reduced genomes. In fact, researchers have recently proposed that these smaller genomes are actually reduced genomes, which adds support to the split gene theory.

=== Origin of the spliceosomal machinery and the eukaryotic cell nucleus ===
Senapathy's research also addresses the origin of the spliceosomal machinery that edits out the introns from the RNA transcripts of genes. If the split genes had originated from random DNA, then the introns would have become an unnecessary but integral part of the eukaryotic genes along with the splice junctions at their ends. The spliceosomal machinery would be required to remove them and to enable the short exons to be linearly spliced together as a contiguously coding mRNA that can be translated into a complete protein. Thus, the split gene theory shows that the whole spliceosomal machinery originated due to the origin of split genes from random DNA sequences, and to remove the unnecessary introns.

Senapathy had also proposed a plausible mechanistic and functional rationale why the eukaryotic nucleus originated, a major unanswered question in biology. If the transcripts of the split genes and the spliced mRNAs were present in a cell without a nucleus, the ribosomes would try to bind to both the un-spliced primary RNA transcript and the spliced mRNA, which would result in a molecular chaos. If a boundary had originated to separate the RNA splicing process from the mRNA translation, it can avoid this problem of molecular chaos. This is exactly what is found in eukaryotic cells, where the splicing of the primary RNA transcript occurs within the nucleus, and the spliced mRNA is transported to the cytoplasm, where the ribosomes translate them into proteins. The nuclear boundary provides a clear separation of the primary RNA splicing and the mRNA translation.

=== Origin of the eukaryotic cell ===
These investigations thus led to the possibility that primordial DNA with essentially random sequence gave rise to the complex structure of the split genes with exons, introns and splice junctions. They also predict that the cells that harbored these split genes had to be complex with a nuclear cytoplasmic boundary, and must have had a spliceosomal machinery. Thus, it was possible that the earliest cell was complex and eukaryotic. Surprisingly, findings from extensive comparative genomics research from several organisms over the past 15 years are showing overwhelmingly that the earliest organisms could have been highly complex and eukaryotic, and could have contained complex proteins, exactly as predicted by Senapathy's theory.

The spliceosome is a highly complex machinery within the eukaryotic cell, containing ~200 proteins and several SnRNPs. In their paper "Complex spliceosomal organization ancestral to extant eukaryotes," molecular biologists Lesley Collins and David Penny state "We begin with the hypothesis that ... the spliceosome has increased in complexity throughout eukaryotic evolution. However, examination of the distribution of spliceosomal components indicates that not only was a spliceosome present in the eukaryotic ancestor but it also contained most of the key components found in today's eukaryotes. ... the last common ancestor of extant eukaryotes appears to show much of the molecular complexity seen today." This suggests that the earliest eukaryotic organisms were highly complex and contained sophisticated genes and proteins, as the split gene theory predicts.

=== The Shapiro-Senapathy algorithm ===
The split gene theory culminated in the Shapiro-Senapathy algorithm, which aids in the identification of splicing mutations that cause numerous diseases and adverse drug reactions. This algorithm is increasingly used in clinical practice and research not only to find mutations in known disease-causing genes in patients, but also to discover novel genes that are causal of different diseases. In addition, it is employed in finding the mechanism of aberrant splicing in individual patients as well as cohorts of patients with a particular disease. Furthermore, it is used in defining the cryptic splice sites and deducing the mechanisms by which mutations in them can affect normal splicing and lead to different diseases. It is also employed in addressing various questions in basic research in humans, animals and plants.

These contributions have had significant impacts in the field of eukaryotic biology and its application to human medicine. These applications may further evolve as the fields of clinical genomics and pharmacogenomics improve their research, with mega sequencing projects such as the All of Us project that will sequence a million individuals, and with the sequencing of millions of patients in clinical practice and research in the future.

== Selected publications ==
- Shapiro, Marvin B.; Senapathy, Periannan (1987). "RNA splice junctions of different classes of eukaryotes: sequence statistics and functional implications in gene expression". Nucleic Acids Research. 15 (17): 7155–7174. doi:10.1093/nar/15.17.7155. PMC 306199. PMID 3658675.
- Senapathy, P. (1988). "Possible evolution of splice-junction signals in eukaryotic genes from stop codons". Proc Natl Acad Sci U S A. 85 (4): 1129–33. Bibcode:1988PNAS...85.1129S. doi:10.1073/pnas.85.4.1129. PMC 279719. PMID 3422483.
- Senapathy, P; Shapiro, MB; Harris, NL (1990). [16] Splice junctions, branch point sites, and exons: Sequence statistics, identification, and applications to genome project. Methods in Enzymology. Vol. 183. pp. 252–78. doi:10.1016/0076-6879(90)83018-5. ISBN 978-0-12-182084-8. PMID 2314278.
- Harris, N.L.; Senapathy, P. (1990). "Distribution and consensus of branch point signals in eukaryotic genes: a computerized statistical analysis". Nucleic Acids Res. 18 (10): 3015–9. doi:10.1093/nar/18.10.3015. PMC 330832. PMID 2349097.
- Senapathy, P. (1986). "Origin of eukaryotic introns: a hypothesis, based on codon distribution statistics in genes, and its implications". Proc Natl Acad Sci U S A. 83 (7): 2133–7. Bibcode:1986PNAS...83.2133S. doi:10.1073/pnas.83.7.2133. PMC 323245. PMID 3457379.
- Regulapati, R.; Bhasi, A.; Singh, C.K.; Senapathy, P. (2008). "Origination of the Split Structure of Spliceosomal Genes from Random Genetic Sequences". PLOS ONE. 3 (10): 10. Bibcode:2008PLoSO...3.3456R. doi:10.1371/journal.pone.0003456. PMC 2565106. PMID 18941625.
- Senapathy, P. (1994) Independent Birth of Organisms. A New Theory That Distinct Organisms Arose Independently From The Primordial Pond Showing That Evolutionary Theories Are Fundamentally Incorrect
- Senapathy, P. (1995). "Introns and the origin of protein-coding genes". Science. 268 (5215): 1366–7. Bibcode:1995Sci...268.1366S. doi:10.1126/science.7761858. PMID 7761858.
