= Robert Blizzard =

Robert Blizzard may refer to:

- Bob Blizzard (1950–2022), British Labour Party politician
- Robert M. Blizzard (1924–2018), American pediatric endocrinologist
