= UBR1 =

Mammalian protein found in Homo sapiens

Identifiers
- Aliases: UBR1, JBS, ubiquitin protein ligase E3 component n-recognin 1
- External IDs: OMIM: 605981; MGI: 1277977; GeneCards: UBR1
Available structures
PDB	Ortholog search: PDBe RCSB
PDB	List of PDB id codes 3NY1
Enzyme activity
EC #	BRENDA	ExPASy	KEGG	MetaCyc
2.3.2.27	↗	↗	↗	↗

Gene location (Human)
Chr.	Chromosome 15 (human)
Band	15q15.2	Start	42,942,897 bp
Band	15q15.2	End	43,106,113 bp

Gene location (Mouse)
Chr.	Chromosome 2 (mouse)
Band	2 E5|2 60.37 cM	Start	120,690,750 bp
Band	2 E5|2 60.37 cM	End	120,801,196 bp
RNA expression pattern
Bgee	Human / Mouse (ortholog); Top expressed in: pancreatic epithelial cell; germinal epithelium; visceral pleura; endothelial cell; parietal pleura; Brodmann area 23; thymus; pancreatic ductal cell; epithelium of nasopharynx; tibia / Top expressed in: ascending aorta; aortic valve; supraoptic nucleus; retinal pigment epithelium; ciliary body; pineal gland; cumulus cell; iris; genital tubercle; tail of embryo; More reference expression data
BioGPS	n/a
Gene ontology
Molecular function	ubiquitin-protein transferase activity; zinc ion binding; leucine binding; metal ion binding; ubiquitin protein ligase activity; transferase activity; protein binding
Cellular component	cytoplasm; proteasome complex; cytosol; ubiquitin ligase complex
Biological process	negative regulation of TOR signaling; cellular response to leucine; ubiquitin-dependent protein catabolic process via the N-end rule pathway; protein catabolic process; protein ubiquitination; ubiquitin-dependent protein catabolic process
Sources:Amigo / QuickGO
Orthologs
Databases	NCBI: entry; OMA: entry
Species	Human	Mouse
Entrez	197131	22222
Ensembl	ENSG00000159459	ENSMUSG00000027272
UniProt	Q8IWV7	O70481
RefSeq (mRNA)	NM_174916	NM_009461
RefSeq (protein)	NP_777576	NP_033487
Location (UCSC)	Chr 15: 42.94 – 43.11 Mb	Chr 2: 120.69 – 120.8 Mb
PubMed search
- Wikidata
View/Edit Human	View/Edit Mouse

The human gene UBR1 encodes the enzyme ubiquitin-protein ligase E3 component n-recognin 1.

The N-end rule pathway is one proteolytic pathway of the ubiquitin system. The recognition component of this pathway, encoded by this gene, binds to a destabilizing N-terminal residue of a substrate protein and participates in the formation of a substrate-linked multiubiquitin chain. This leads to the eventual degradation of the substrate protein. The protein described in this record has a RING-type zinc finger and a UBR-type zinc finger. Mutations in this gene have been associated with Johanson–Blizzard syndrome.
