= Split gene theory =

The split gene theory offers an explanation for the origin of eukaryotic introns. It suggests that random primordial DNA sequences would only permit short (< 600bp) open reading frames (ORFs) due to frequent stop codons. The short ORFs could have contained the short protein-coding exons observed in eukaryotic genes, whereas the intervening sequences with numerous stop codons could have formed long non-coding introns. In this introns-first framework, the spliceosomal machinery evolved due to the necessity to join exons into longer protein-coding sequences, and intron-less bacterial genes were derived from split eukaryotic genes through the loss of introns. The theory was introduced by Periannan Senapathy.

The theory provides solutions for the origin of split gene architecture, including exons, introns, splice junctions, and branch points from random genetic sequences. It also provides possible solutions for the origin of the spliceosomal machinery, the nuclear boundary, and the eukaryotic cell from prebiotic chemistry.

This theory led to the Shapiro–Senapathy algorithm, which provides a methodology for detecting splice sites in eukaryotic DNA, and has been used to find splice site mutations that cause hundreds of diseases.

The split gene theory contradicts the scientific consensus about the formation of eukaryotic cells by endosymbiosis of bacteria. In 1994, Senapathy wrote a book about this aspect of his theory - The Independent Birth of Organisms. It proposed that multiple eukaryotic genomes originated independently from a primordial pool of split genes. Dutch biologist Gert Korthoff criticized the theory by posing various problems that cannot be explained by a theory of independent origins. He pointed out that various eukaryotes need nurturing and called this the 'boot problem', in that even the initial eukaryote needed parental care. Korthoff notes that a large fraction of eukaryotes are parasites. Senapathy's theory would require a coincidence to explain their existence. Senapathy's theory cannot explain the strong evidence for common descent (homology, universal genetic code, embryology, fossil record.)

== Background ==
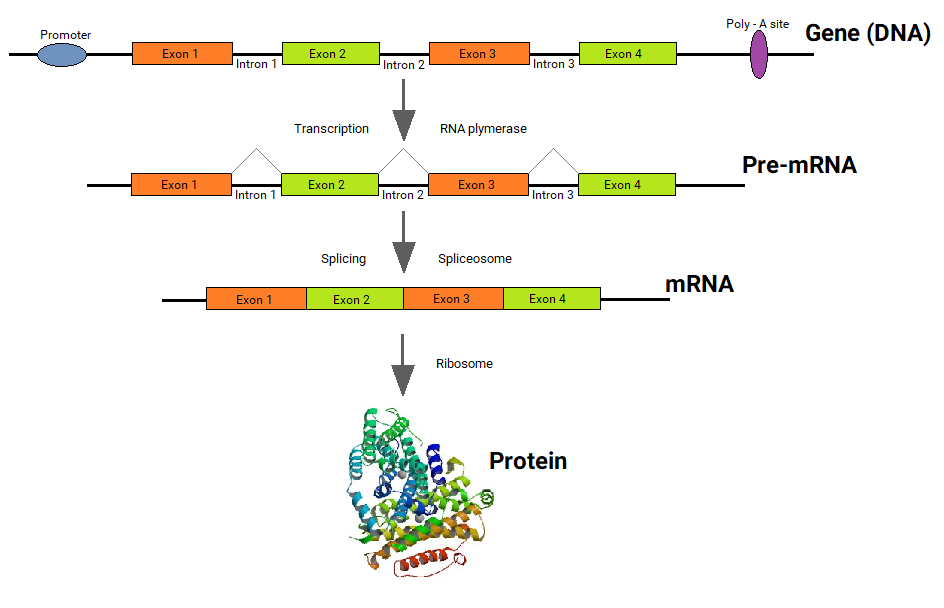
Transcription, splicing and translation of a eukaryotic gene. A eukaryotic gene consists of a promoter, exons, introns and a poly-A addition site. It is transcribed into a primary RNA transcript (or pre-mRNA) by the RNA polymerase enzyme. This RNA undergoes the process of editing by the spliceosome for the precise removal of the introns and joining of the exons, which produces the mRNA molecule. This mRNA contains the complete coding sequence without any interrupting stop codons that is translated by the ribosome into the protein encoded by the gene. In the figure, the lengths of introns are short, but in reality, they are extremely long, on average 20 times longer than the exons, and often even much longer up to around 500,000 bases. The exons are usually short with an average of ~120 bases, and with an upper maximum of ~600 bases. Also shown is an example protein structure (PDB ID: 2VUX) for the Human ribonucleotide reductase, subunit M2 B.

Genes of all organisms, except bacteria, consist of short protein-coding regions (exons) interrupted by long sequences (introns). When a gene is expressed, its DNA sequence is copied into a "primary RNA" sequence by the enzyme RNA polymerase. Then the "spliceosome" machinery physically removes the introns from the RNA copy of the gene by the process of splicing, leaving only a contiguously connected series of exons, which becomes messenger RNA (mRNA). This mRNA is now read by the ribosome, which produces the encoded protein. Thus, although introns are not physically removed from a gene, a gene's sequence is read as if introns were not present.

Exons are usually short, with an average length of about 120 bases (e.g. in human genes). Intron lengths vary widely from 10 to 500,000, but exon lengths have an upper bound of about 600 bases in most eukaryotes. Because exons code for protein sequences, they are important for the cell, yet constitute only ~2% of the sequences. Introns, in contrast, constitute 98% of the sequences but seem to have few crucial functions, except for enhancer sequences and developmental regulators in rare instances.

Until Philip Sharp and Richard Roberts discovered introns within eukaryotic genes in 1977, it was believed that the coding sequence of all genes was always in one single stretch, bounded by a single long ORF. The discovery of introns was a profound surprise, which instantly brought up the questions of how, why and when the introns came into the eukaryotic genes.

It soon became apparent that a typical eukaryotic gene was interrupted at many locations by introns, dividing the coding sequence into many short exons. Also surprising was that the introns were long, as long as hundreds of thousands of bases. These findings prompted the questions of why many introns occur within a gene (for example, ~312 introns occur in the human gene TTN), why they are long, and why exons are short.

The longest introns in the human genome
Gene symbol	Gene length (bases)	Longest Intron length (bases)	Number of introns in the gene
ROBO2	1,743,269	1,160,411	104
KCNIP4	1,220,183	1,097,903	76
ASIC2	1,161,877	1,043,911	18
NRG1	1,128,573	956,398	177
DPP10	1,403,453	866,399	142

It was also discovered that the spliceosome machinery was large and complex with ~300 proteins and several SnRNA molecules. The questions extended to the origin of the spliceosome. Soon after the discovery of introns, it became apparent that the junctions between exons and introns on either side exhibited specific sequences that directed the spliceosome machinery to the exact base position for splicing. How and why these splice junction signals came into being was another important question.

== History ==
The discovery of introns and the split gene architecture of the eukaryotic genes started a new era of eukaryotic biology. The question of why eukaryotic genes had fragmented genes prompted speculation and discussion almost immediately.

Ford Doolittle published a paper in 1978 in which he stated that most molecular biologists assumed that the eukaryotic genome arose from a 'simpler' and more 'primitive' prokaryotic genome rather like that of Escherichia coli. However, this type of evolution would require that introns be introduced into the coding sequences of bacterial genes. Regarding this requirement, Doolittle said, "It is extraordinarily difficult to imagine how informationally irrelevant sequences could be introduced into pre-existing structural genes without deleterious effects." He stated "I would like to argue that the eukaryotic genome, at least in that aspect of its structure manifested as 'genes in pieces' is in fact the primitive original form."

James Darnell expressed similar views in 1978. He stated, "The differences in the biochemistry of messenger RNA formation in eukaryotes compared to prokaryotes are so profound as to suggest that sequential prokaryotic to eukaryotic cell evolution seems unlikely. The recently discovered non-contiguous sequences in eukaryotic DNA that encode messenger RNA may reflect an ancient, rather than a new, distribution of information in DNA and that eukaryotes evolved independently of prokaryotes."

However, in an apparent attempt to reconcile with the idea that RNA preceded DNA in evolution, and with the concept of the three evolutionary lineages of archea, bacteria and eukarya, both Doolittle and Darnell deviated from their original speculation in a joint paper in 1985. They suggested that the ancestor of all three groups of organisms, the 'progenote,' had a genes-in-pieces structure, from which all three lineages evolved. They speculated that the precellular stage had primitive RNA genes which had introns, which were reverse transcribed into DNA and formed the progenote. Bacteria and archea evolved from the progenote by losing introns, and 'urkaryote' evolved from it by retaining introns. Later, the eukaryote evolved from the urkaryote by evolving a nucleus and absorbing mitochondria from bacteria. Multicellular organisms then evolved from the eukaryote.

These authors predicted that the distinctions between the prokaryote and the eukaryote were so profound that the prokaryote to eukaryote evolution was not tenable, and had different origins. However, other than the speculations that the precellular RNA genes must have had introns, they did not address the key questions of intron origin. No explanations described why exons were short and introns were long, how the splice junctions originated, what the structure and sequence of the splice junctions meant, and why eukaryote genomes were large.

Around the same time that Doolittle and Darnell suggested that introns in eukaryotic genes could be ancient, Colin Blake and Walter Gilbert published their views on intron origins independently. In their view, introns originated as spacer sequences that enabled convenient recombination and shuffling of exons that encoded distinct functional domains in order to evolve new genes. Thus, new genes were assembled from exon modules that coded for functional domains, folding regions, or structural elements from preexisting genes in the genome of an ancestral organism, thereby evolving genes with new functions. They did not specify how exons or introns originated. In addition, even after many years, extensive analysis of thousands of proteins and genes showed that only extremely rarely do genes exhibit the supposed exon shuffling phenomenon. Furthermore, molecular biologists questioned the exon shuffling proposal, from a purely evolutionary view for both methodological and conceptual reasons, and, in the long run, this theory did not survive.

== Hypothesis ==
Around the time introns were discovered, Senapathy was asking how genes themselves could have originated. He surmised that for any gene to come into being, genetic sequences (RNA or DNA) must have been present in the prebiotic environment. A basic question he asked was how protein-coding sequences could have originated from primordial DNA sequences at the origin of the first cells.

To answer this, he made two basic assumptions:

- before a self-replicating cell could come into existence, DNA molecules were synthesized in the primordial soup by random addition of the 4 nucleotides without the help of templates and
- the nucleotide sequences that code for proteins were selected from these preexisting random DNA sequences in the primordial soup, and not by construction from shorter coding sequences.

He also surmised that codons must have been established prior to the origin of the first genes. If primordial DNA did contain random nucleotide sequences, he asked: Was there an upper limit in coding-sequence lengths, and, if so, did this limit play a crucial role in the formation of the structural features of genes at the origin of genes?

His logic was the following. The average length of proteins in living organisms, including the eukaryotic and bacterial organisms, was ~400 amino acids. However, much longer proteins existed, even longer than 10,000-30,000 amino acids in both eukaryotes and bacteria. Thus, the coding sequence of thousands of bases existed in a single stretch in bacterial genes. In contrast, the coding sequence of eukaryotes existed only in short segments of exons of ~120 bases regardless of the length of the protein. If the coding sequence ORF lengths in random DNA sequences were as long as those in bacterial organisms, then long, contiguous coding genes were possible in random DNA. This was not known, as the distribution of ORF lengths in a random DNA sequence had never been studied.

As random DNA sequences could be generated in the computer, Senapathy thought that he could ask these questions and conduct his experiments in silico. Furthermore, when he began studying this question, sufficient DNA and protein sequence information existed in the National Biomedical Research Foundation (NBRF) database in the early 1980s.

== Testing the hypothesis ==
=== Origin of introns/split genes ===
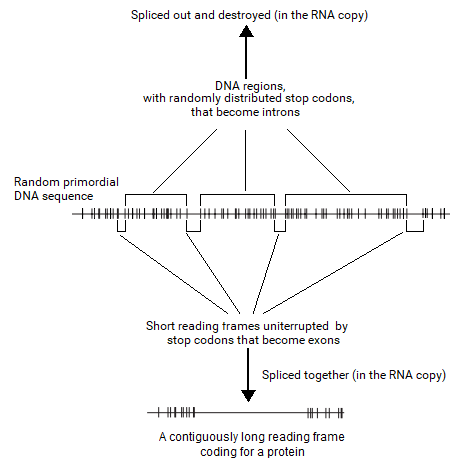
The clustering of stop codons in a random DNA sequence lead to rare ORFs that are long. The negative exponential frequency distribution of the ORF lengths in a random sequence indicates that, in a linear sequence, the shorter the ORFs they are more frequent, and the longer the ORFs they are less and less frequent. Thus, there is a tendency for stop codons to be clustered in most places in a sequence, and, therefore, the longer ORFs are rarer, even within the upper maximum length of ~600 bases. Senapathy reasoned that, coding sequence segments from the available long ORFs could be chosen as exons, whereas the intervening sequences with clusters of stop codons could be earmarked as introns to be deleted from the primary RNA transcript, which would lead to a split gene structure.

Senapathy analyzed the distribution of the ORF lengths in computer-generated random DNA sequences first. Surprisingly, this study revealed that about 200 codons (600 bases) was the upper limit in ORF lengths. The shortest ORF (zero base in length) was the most frequent. At increasing lengths of ORFs, their frequency decreased logarithmically, approaching zero at about 600 bases. When the probability of ORF lengths in a random sequence was plotted, it revealed that the probability of increasing lengths of ORFs decreased exponentially and tailed off at a maximum of about 600 bases. From this "negative exponential" distribution of ORF lengths, it was found that most of ORFs were far shorter than the maximum.

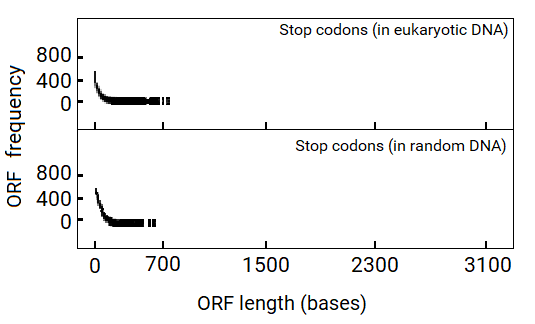
The negative exponential distribution of ORF lengths in a random DNA sequence and in eukaryotic DNA sequences. Senapathy found that stop codons occur at a high frequency in a random DNA sequence, as 3 stop codons exist out of 64 codons, which leads to short open reading frames (ORFs) with average length of ~60 bases. He also found that the lengths of the ORFs are distributed in a negative exponential manner. This plot indicates that the frequency of the zero ORF length (consecutive stop-codons occurring tandemly) is the most frequent of all ORF lengths, the frequency of ORF length of one codon (3 bases) is the next most frequent, and so on. The frequency of longer ORFs reduces exponentially, and reaches a zero frequency around an ORF length of ~600 bases, which means that ORFs longer than 600 bases do not occur. Surprisingly, the plot from the eukaryotic DNA sequences was almost exactly the same as that from the random DNA sequences.

This finding was surprising because the coding sequence for the average protein length of 400 AAs (with ~1,200 bases of coding sequence) and longer proteins of thousands of AAs (requiring >10,000 bases of coding sequence) would not occur at a stretch in a random sequence. If this was true, a typical gene with a contiguous coding sequence could not originate in a random sequence. Thus, the only possible way that any gene could originate from a random sequence was to split the coding sequence into shorter segments and select these segments from short ORFs available in the random sequence, rather than to increase the ORF length by eliminating consecutive stop codons. This process of choosing short segments of coding sequences from the available ORFs to make a long ORF would lead to a split structure.

If this hypothesis was true, eukaryotic DNA sequences should reflect it. When Senapathy plotted the distribution of ORF lengths in eukaryotic DNA sequences, the plot was remarkably similar to that from random DNA sequences. This plot was also a negative exponential distribution that tailed off at a maximum of about 600 bases, as with eukaryotic genes, which coincided exactly with the maximum length of ORFs observed in both random DNA and eukaryotic DNA sequences.

The split genes thus originated from random DNA sequences by choosing the best of the short coding segments (exons) and splicing them. The intervening intron sequences were left-over vestiges of the random sequences, and thus were earmarked to be removed by the spliceosome. These findings indicated that split genes could have originated from random DNA sequences with exons and introns as they appear in today's eukaryotic organisms. Nobel Laureate Marshall Nirenberg, who deciphered the codons, stated that these findings strongly showed that the split gene theory for the origin of introns and the split structure of genes must be valid.

Blake proposed the Gilbert-Blake hypothesis in 1979 for the origin of introns and stated that Senapathy's split gene theory comprehensively explained the origin of the split gene structure. In addition, he stated that it explained several key questions including the origin of the splicing mechanism:

Recent work by Senapathy, when applied to RNA, comprehensively explains the origin of the segregated form of RNA into coding and non-coding regions. It also suggests why a splicing mechanism was developed at the start of primordial evolution. He found that the distribution of reading frame lengths in a random nucleotide sequence corresponded exactly to that for the observed distribution of eukaryotic exon sizes. These were delimited by regions containing stop signals, the messages to terminate construction of the polypeptide chain, and were thus non-coding regions or introns. The presence of a random sequence was therefore sufficient to create in the primordial ancestor the segregated form of RNA observed in the eukaryotic gene structure. Moreover, the random distribution also displays a cutoff at 600 nucleotides, which suggests that the maximum size for an early polypeptide was 200 residues, again as observed in the maximum size of the eukaryotic exon. Thus, in response to evolutionary pressures to create larger and more complex genes, the RNA fragments were joined together by a splicing mechanism that removed the introns. Hence, the early existence of both introns and RNA splicing in eukaryotes appears to be very likely from a simple statistical basis. These results also agree with the linear relationship found between the number of exons in the gene for a particular protein and the length of the polypeptide chain."

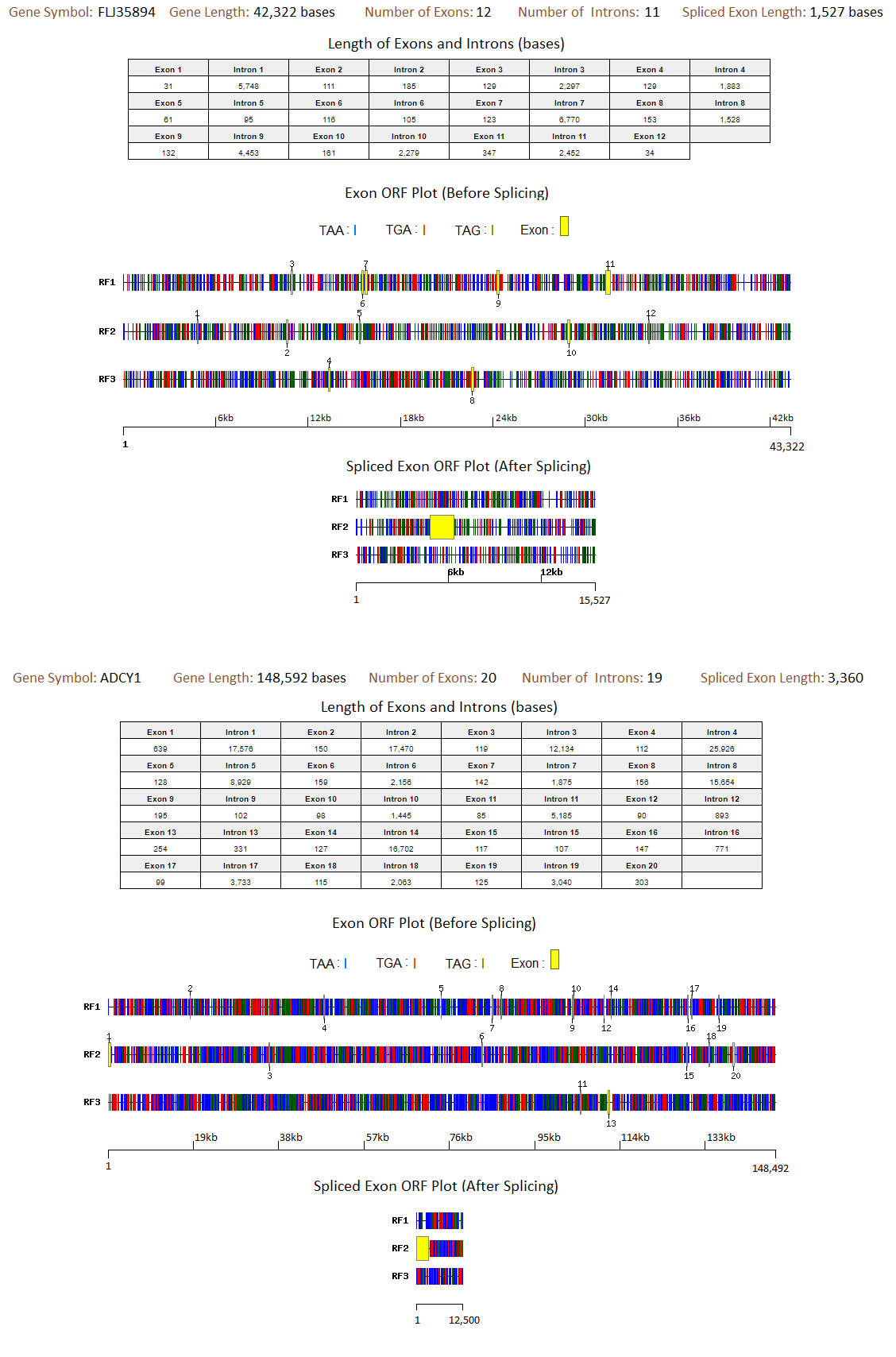
Corroboration of the Split Gene Theory by actual DNA sequences of human genes. The Split Gene Theory predicts that all three stop codons should be present at a high frequency in each of the three reading frames (RFs), which would lead to short Open Reading Frames (ORFs). It also predicts that: a) exons would occur within these short ORFs in all three RFs; b) introns would be long, and that c) exon lengths would be confined to ORF lengths. These predictions are precisely true in the DNA sequences of most eukaryotic genes. Two example genes (FLJ35894 and ADCY1) from the human genome are shown. All of the exons in each gene are short, and most of the introns are long. In each gene, the exons (short yellow boxes) are confined to short ORFs that occurred in the DNA sequence. In addition, stop codons occur at the ends of the exons, which are actually part of the splice junction sequences.

=== Origin of splice junctions ===
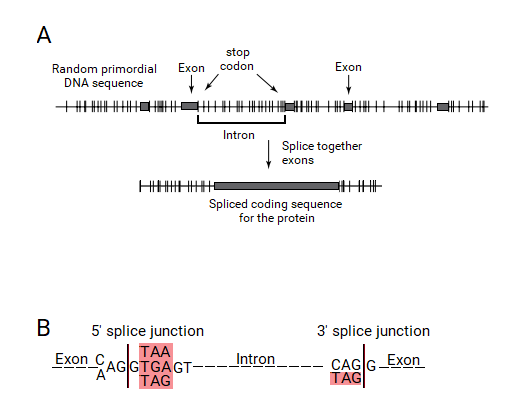
Origin of splice junction sequences from the stop codons. (A) The molecular machinery that chose the exons of a split gene from a random primordial DNA sequence should be capable of searching for stop codons (tick marks) to identify regions without stop codons (in the primary RNA copy, not shown), which are the ORFs. In doing so, the first encountered stop codon will be marked as the start of the intron. This process will lead to the presence of a stop codon at the beginning of the introns. Sometimes, all of an Open Reading Frame is chosen to be an exon, because of which the end of the previous intron will have a stop codon. (B) The start and the end of the intron are parts of the "splice junction sequences," that signal the exact point of splicing to the spliceosome machinery. The stop codons are shown with a red background.

Under the split gene theory, an exon is defined by an ORF. It requires a mechanism to recognize an ORF to have originated. As an ORF is defined by a contiguous coding sequence bounded by stop codons, these stop codon ends had to be recognized by the exon-intron gene recognition system. This system could have defined the exons by the presence of a stop codon at the ends of ORFs, which should be included within the ends of the introns and eliminated by the splicing process. Thus, the introns should contain a stop codon at their ends, which would be part of the splice junction sequences.

If this hypothesis was true, the split genes of today's living organisms should contain stop codons exactly at the ends of introns. When Senapathy tested this hypothesis in the splice junctions of eukaryotic genes, he found that the vast majority of splice junctions did contain a stop codon at the end of each intron, outside of the exons. In fact, these stop codons were found to form the "canonical" GT:AG splicing sequence, with the three stop codons occurring as part of the strong consensus signals. Thus, the basic split gene theory for the origin of introns and the split gene structure led to the understanding that the splice junctions originated from the stop codons.

Frequency of stop codons in donor and acceptor splice-junction sequences.
Codon	Number of occurrences in donor signal	Number of occurrences in acceptor signal
TAA	370	0
TGA	293	0
TAG	64	234
CAG	7	746
Other	297*	50
Total	1030	1030
*More than 70% are TAX [TAT = 75; TAC = 59; TGT = 70].

Sequence data for only about 1,000 exon-intron junctions were available when Senapathy thought about this question. He took the data for 1,030 splice junction sequences (donors and acceptors) and counted the codons occurring at each of the 7- base positions in the donor signal sequence [CAG:GTGAGT] and each of the possible 2-base positions in the acceptor signal [CAG:G] from the GenBank database. He found that the stop codons occurred at high frequency only at the 5th base position in the donor signal and the first base position in the acceptor signal. These positions are the* start of the intron (in fact, one base after the start) and at the end of the intron, as Senapathy had predicted. The codon counts at only these positions are shown. Even when the codons at these positions were not stop codons, 70% of them began with the first two bases of the stop codons TA and TG [TAT = 75; TAC = 59; TGT = 70].

All three stop codons (TGA, TAA and TAG) were found after one base (G) at the start of introns. These stop codons are shown in the consensus canonical donor splice junction as AG:GT(A/G)GGT, wherein the TAA and TGA are the stop codons, and the additional TAG is also present at this position. Besides the codon CAG, only TAG, which is a stop codon, was found at the ends of introns. The canonical acceptor splice junction is shown as (C/T)AG:GT, in which TAG is the stop codon. These consensus sequences clearly show the presence of the stop codons at the ends of introns bordering the exons in all eukaryotic genes, thus providing a strong corroboration for the split gene theory. Nirenberg again stated that these observations fully supported the split gene theory for the origin of splice junction sequences from stop codons.

Soon after the discovery of introns by Philip Sharp and Richard Roberts, it became known that mutations within splice junctions could lead to diseases. Senapathy showed that mutations in the stop codon bases (canonical bases) caused more diseases than the mutations in non-canonical bases.

=== Branch point (lariat) sequence ===
An intermediate stage in the process of eukaryotic RNA splicing is the formation of a lariat structure. It is anchored at an adenosine residue in intron between 10 and 50 nucleotides upstream of the 3' splice site. A short conserved sequence (the branch point sequence) functions as the recognition signal for the site of lariat formation. During the splicing process, this conserved sequence towards the end of the intron forms a lariat structure with the beginning of the intron. The final step of the splicing process occurs when the two exons are joined and the intron is released as a lariat RNA.

Several investigators found the branch point sequences in different organisms including yeast, human, fruit fly, rat, and plants. Senapathy found that, in all of these sequences, the codon ending at the branch point adenosine is consistently a stop codon. What is interesting is that two of the three stop codons (TAA and TGA) occur almost all of the time at this position.

Organism	Lariat Consensus sequence
Yeast	TACTAAC
Human Beta globin genes	CTGAC CTAAT CTGAT CTAAC CTCAC
Drosophila	CTAAT
Rats	CTGAC
Plants	(C/T)T(A/G)A(T/C)
Consistent presence of stop codons in branch point signal sequences. Lariat (branch point) sequences have been identified from many different organisms.These sequences consistently show that the codon ending in the branching adenosine is a stop codon, either TAA or TGA, which are shown in red.

These findings led Senapathy to propose that the branch point signal originated from stop codons. The finding that two different stop codons (TAA and TGA) occur within the lariat signal with the branching point as the third base of the stop codons corroborates this proposal. As the branching point of the lariat occurs at the last adenine of the stop codon, it is possible that the spliceosome machinery that originated for the elimination of the stop codons from the primary RNA sequence created an auxiliary stop-codon sequence signal as the lariat sequence to aid its splicing function.

The small nuclear U2 RNA found in splicing complexes is thought to aid splicing by interacting with the lariat sequence. Complementary sequences for both the lariat sequence and the acceptor signal are present in a segment of only 15 nucleotides in U2 RNA. Further, the U1 RNA has been proposed to function as a guide in splicing to identify the precise donor splice junction by complementary base-pairing. The conserved regions of the U1 RNA thus include sequences complementary to the stop codons. These observations enabled Senapathy to predict that stop codons had operated in the origin of not only the splice-junction signals and the lariat signal, but also some small nuclear RNAs.

=== Gene regulatory sequences ===
Senapathy proposed that the gene-expression regulatory sequences (promoter and poly-A addition site sequences) also could have originated from stop codons. A conserved sequence, AATAAA, exists in almost every gene a short distance downstream from the end of the protein-coding message and serves as a signal for the addition of poly(A) in the mRNA copy of the gene. This poly(A) sequence signal contains a stop codon, TAA. A sequence shortly downstream from this signal, thought to be part of the complete poly(A) signal, also contains the TAG and TGA stop codons.

Eukaryotic RNA-polymerase-II-dependent promoters can contain a TATA box (consensus sequence TATAAA), which contains the stop codon TAA. Bacterial promoter elements at ~10 bases exhibits a TATA box with a consensus of TATAAT (which contains the stop codon TAA), and at -35 bases exhibits a consensus of TTGACA (containing the stop codon TGA). Thus, the evolution of the whole RNA processing mechanism seems to have been influenced by the too-frequent occurrence of stop codons, thus making the stop codons the focal points for RNA processing.

=== Stop codons are key parts of every genetic element in the eukaryotic gene ===
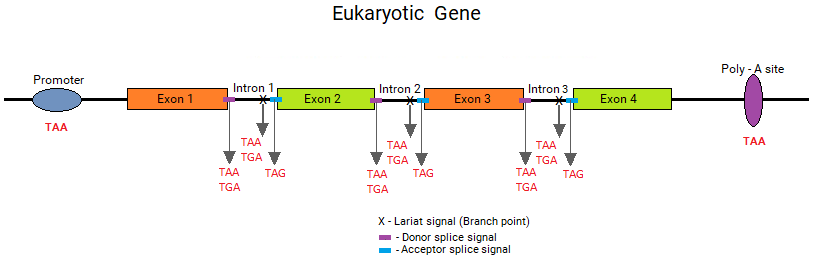
Stop codons occur as key parts of all important genetic elements in eukaryotic genes. The key genetic elements of eukaryotic genes are the promoters, donor and acceptor splice junction signals, lariat (branch point) signals, and poly-A addition sites. The core component of each of these genetic elements is a stop codon.

Genetic Element	Consensus sequence
Promoter	TATAAT
Donor Splice Sequence	CAG:GTAAGT CAG:GTGAGT
Acceptor Splice Sequence	(C/T)9...TAG:GT
Lariat Sequence	CTGAC CTAAC
Poly-A addition site	TATAAA
The consistent occurrence of stop codons in genetic elements in eukaryotic genes.The consensus sequences of the different genetic elements in eukaryotic genes are shown. The stop codon(s) in each of these sequences are colored in red.

Senapathy discovered that stop codons occur as key parts in every genetic element in eukaryotic genes. The table and figure show that the key parts of the core promoter elements, the lariat signal, the donor and acceptor splice signals, and the poly-A addition signal consist of one or more stop codons. This finding corroborates the split gene theory's claim that the underlying reason for the complete split gene paradigm is the origin of split genes from random DNA sequences, wherein random distribution of an extremely high frequency of stop codons were used by nature to define these genetic elements.

== Short exons/long introns ==
Research based on the split gene theory sheds light on other basic questions of exons and introns. The exons of eukaryotes are generally short (human exons average ~120 bases, and can be as short as 10 bases) and introns are usually long (average of ~3,000 bases, and can be several hundred thousands bases long), for example genes RBFOX1, CNTNAP2, PTPRD and DLG2. Senapathy provided an answer for why exons are short and introns are long. If eukaryotic genes originated from random DNA sequences, they have to match the lengths of ORFs from random sequences, and possibly should be around 100 bases (close to the median length of ORFs in random sequence). The genome sequences of living organisms exhibit exactly the same average lengths of 120 bases for exons, and the longest exons of 600 bases (with few exceptions), which is the same length as that of the longest random ORFs.

If split genes originated in random DNA sequences, then exons would be short and introns would be long for several reasons. Frequent stop codons in random DNA sequences would lead to short ORFs, restricting the lengths of exons. Furthermore, the probability for a functional protein-coding exon to occur in a long stretch of random sequence would be low. In addition, the combination of donor and acceptor splice junction sequences within short lengths of coding sequence segments that would define exon boundaries would occur rarely in a random sequence. These combined reasons would make introns long compared to exons.

== Spliceosomal machinery and eukaryotic nucleus ==
Senapathy addressed the origin of the spliceosomal machinery that edits out the introns from RNA transcripts. If the split genes had originated from random DNA, then the introns would have become an unnecessary but integral part of eukaryotic genes along with the splice junctions. The spliceosomal machinery would be required to remove them and to enable the short exons to be linearly spliced together as a contiguously coding mRNA that can be translated into a complete protein. Thus, the split gene theory argues that spliceosomal machinery exists to remove the unnecessary introns.

Blake states, "Work by Senapathy, when applied to RNA, comprehensively explains the origin of the segregated form of RNA into coding and noncoding regions. It also suggests why a splicing mechanism was developed at the start of primordial evolution."

== Eukaryotes ==
Senapathy proposed a plausible mechanistic and functional rationale why the eukaryotic nucleus originated, a major question in biology. If the transcripts of the split genes and the spliced mRNAs were present in a cell without a nucleus, the ribosomes would try to bind to both the un-spliced primary RNA transcript and the spliced mRNA, which would result in chaos. A boundary that separates the RNA splicing process from the mRNA translation avoids this problem. The nuclear boundary provides a clear separation of the primary RNA splicing and the mRNA translation.

These investigations thus led to the possibility that primordial DNA with essentially random sequence gave rise to the complex structure of the split genes with exons, introns and splice junctions. Cells that harbored split genes had to be complex with a nuclear cytoplasmic boundary, and must have a spliceosomal machinery. Thus, it was possible that the earliest cell was complex and eukaryotic. Surprisingly, findings from extensive comparative genomics research from several organisms since 2007 overwhelmingly show that the earliest organisms could have been highly complex and eukaryotic, and could have contained complex proteins, as predicted by Senapathy's theory.

The spliceosome is a highly complex mechanism, containing ~200 proteins and several SnRNPs. Collins and Penny stated, "We begin with the hypothesis that ... the spliceosome has increased in complexity throughout eukaryotic evolution. However, examination of the distribution of spliceosomal components indicates that not only was a spliceosome present in the eukaryotic ancestor but it also contained most of the key components found in today's eukaryotes. ... the last common ancestor of extant eukaryotes appears to show much of the molecular complexity seen today." This suggests that the earliest eukaryotic organisms were complex and contained sophisticated genes and proteins.

== Bacterial genes ==
Genes with uninterrupted coding sequences that are thousands of bases long - up to 90,000 bases - that occur in many bacterial organisms were practically impossible to have occurred. However, the bacterial genes could have originated from split genes by losing introns, the only proposed way to arrive at long coding sequences. It is also a better way than by increasing the lengths of ORFs from short random ORFs to long ORFs by specifically removing the stop codons by mutation.

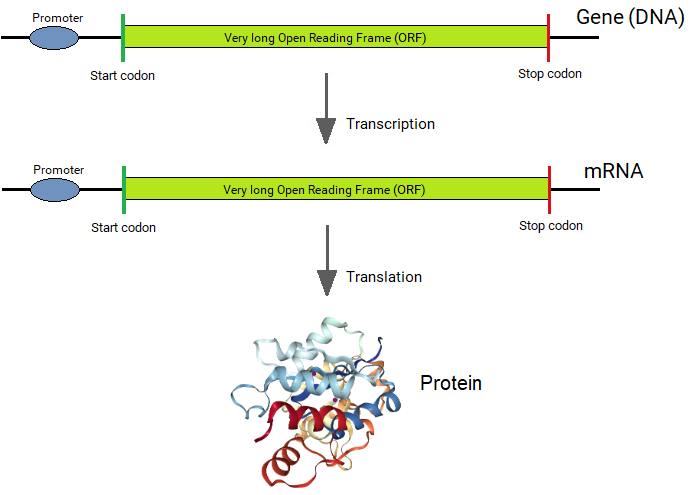
Origin of bacterial genes from split genes. The split genes of modern eukaryotes with short exons (average length of 120 bases, and maximum of ~600 bases) interrupted by long introns are extremely probable in random DNA sequences due to the reasons described in the section Origin of introns and the split gene structure, above. In contrast, the long contiguously coding bacterial genes (that can be as long and 10,000 bases, and longer up to 90,000 bases) without introns are practically impossible to occur in random sequences. Thus, the only way that bacterial genes could originate was to delete the introns from the split genes that occurred in random DNA sequences and produce contiguously coding genes. The example protein shown with its 3D structure is from PDB database (ID:1UNF).

Gene size (bases)	Number of genes
5,000 - 10,000	3,029
10,000 - 15,000	492
15,000 - 20,000	131
20,000 - 25,000	39
>25,000	41
Long coding sequences occur as long ORFs in bacterial genes. Thousands of genes that are longer than 5,000 bases, coding for proteins that are longer than 2,000 amino acids, exist in many bacterial genomes. The longest protein coding genes are ~90,000 bases long. Each occurs in a single stretch of coding sequence (ORF) without stop codons or introns.

According to the split gene theory, this process of intron loss could have happened from prebiotic random DNA. These contiguously coding genes could be tightly organized in the bacterial genomes without any introns and be more streamlined. According to Senapathy, the nuclear boundary that was required for a cell containing split genes would not be required for a cell containing only uninterrupted genes. Thus, the bacterial cells did not develop a nucleus. Based on split gene theory, the eukaryotic genomes and bacterial genomes could have independently originated from the split genes in primordial random DNA sequences.

== Shapiro-Senapathy algorithm ==
Senapathy developed algorithms to detect donor and acceptor splice sites, exons and a complete split gene in a genomic sequence. He developed the position weight matrix (PWM) method based on the frequency of the four bases at the consensus sequences of the donor and acceptor in different organisms to identify the splice sites in a given sequence. Furthermore, he formulated the first algorithm to find the exons based on the requirement of exons to contain a donor sequence (at the 5' end) and an acceptor sequence (at the 3' end), and an ORF in which the exon should occur, and another algorithm to find a complete split gene. These algorithms are collectively known as the Shapiro-Senapathy algorithm (S&S).

This algorithm aids in the identification of splicing mutations that cause disease and adverse drug reactions. Scientists used the algorithm to identify mutations and genes that cause cancers, inherited disorders, immune deficiency diseases and neurological disorders. It is increasingly used in clinical practice and research to find mutations in known disease-causing genes in patients and to discover novel genes that are causal of different diseases. Furthermore, it is used in defining the cryptic splice sites and deducing the mechanisms by which mutations can affect normal splicing and lead to different diseases. It is also employed in basic research.

Findings based on S&S have impacted major questions in eukaryotic biology and in human medicine.

== Corroborating evidence ==
The split gene theory implies that structural features of split genes predicted from computer-simulated random sequences occur in eukaryotic split genes. This is borne out in most known split genes. The sequences exhibit a nearly perfect negative exponential distribution of ORF lengths. With rare exceptions, eukaryotic gene exons fall within the predicted 600 base maximum.

The theory correctly predicts that exons are delimited by stop codons, especially at the 3' ends of exons. Actually they are precisely delimited more strongly at the 3' ends of exons and less strongly at the 5' ends in most known genes, as predicted. These stop codons are the most important functional parts of both splice junctions. The theory thus provides an explanation for the "conserved" splice junctions at the ends of exons and for the loss of these stop codons along with introns when they are spliced out. The theory correctly predicts that splice junctions are randomly distributed in eukaryotic DNA sequences. The theory correctly predicts that splice junctions present in transfer RNA genes and ribosomal RNA genes, do not contain stop codons. The lariat signal, another sequence involved in the splicing process, also contains stop codons.

The theory correctly predicts that introns are non-coding and that they are mostly non-functional. Except for some intron sequences including the donor and acceptor splice signal sequences and branch point sequences, and possibly the intron splice enhancers that occur at the ends of introns, which aid in the removal of introns, the vast majority of introns are devoid of any functions. The theory does not exclude rare sequences within introns that could be used by the genome and the cell, especially because introns are so long.

Thus, the theory's predictions are precisely corroborated by the major elements in modern eukaryotic genomes.

Comparative analysis of the modern genome data from several living organisms found that the characteristics of split genes trace back to the earliest organisms. These organisms could have contained the split genes and complex proteins that occur in today's living organisms.

Studies employing maximum likelihood analysis found that the earliest eukaryotic organisms contained the same genes as modern organisms with yet a higher intron density. Comparative genomics of many organisms including basal eukaryotes (considered to be primitive eukaryotic organisms such as Amoeboflagellata, Diplomonadida, and Parabasalia) showed that intron-rich split genes accompanied and spliceosome from modern organisms were present in their earliest forebears, and that the earliest organisms came with all the eukaryotic cellular components.

== Selected publications ==
- Shapiro, Marvin B.; Senapathy, Periannan (1987). "RNA splice junctions of different classes of eukaryotes: sequence statistics and functional implications in gene expression". Nucleic Acids Research. 15 (17): 7155–7174. doi:10.1093/nar/15.17.7155. PMC 306199. PMID 3658675.
- Senapathy, P. (1988). "Possible evolution of splice-junction signals in eukaryotic genes from stop codons". Proc Natl Acad Sci U S A. 85 (4): 1129–33. Bibcode:1988PNAS...85.1129S. doi:10.1073/pnas.85.4.1129. PMC 279719. PMID 3422483.
- Senapathy, P; Shapiro, MB; Harris, NL (1990). [16] Splice junctions, branch point sites, and exons: Sequence statistics, identification, and applications to genome project. Methods in Enzymology. Vol. 183. pp. 252–78. doi:10.1016/0076-6879(90)83018-5. ISBN 978-0-12-182084-8. PMID 2314278.
- Harris, N.L.; Senapathy, P. (1990). "Distribution and consensus of branch point signals in eukaryotic genes: a computerized statistical analysis". Nucleic Acids Res. 18 (10): 3015–9. doi:10.1093/nar/18.10.3015. PMC 330832. PMID 2349097.
- Senapathy, P. (1986). "Origin of eukaryotic introns: a hypothesis, based on codon distribution statistics in genes, and its implications". Proc Natl Acad Sci U S A. 83 (7): 2133–7. Bibcode:1986PNAS...83.2133S. doi:10.1073/pnas.83.7.2133. PMC 323245. PMID 3457379.
- Regulapati, R.; Bhasi, A.; Singh, C.K.; Senapathy, P. (2008). "Origination of the Split Structure of Spliceosomal Genes from Random Genetic Sequences". PLOS ONE. 3 (10): 10. Bibcode:2008PLoSO...3.3456R. doi:10.1371/journal.pone.0003456. PMC 2565106. PMID 18941625.
- Senapathy, P. (1995). "Introns and the origin of protein-coding genes". Science. 268 (5215): 1366–7. Bibcode:1995Sci...268.1366S. doi:10.1126/science.7761858. PMID 7761858.
