= Ann J. Johanson =

American pediatric endocrinologist (1934–2020)

Ann J. Johanson (1934 – 2020) was an American pediatric endocrinologist. She was a professor at the University of Virginia School of Medicine. At UVA, she was the founding director of the Division of Pediatric Endocrinology. In 1971, she and her colleague Robert M. Blizzard first described Johanson-Blizzard Syndrome.

Johanson was born in St. Louis, Missouri, and was a graduate of Webster Groves High School.
