= Clinicogenomics =

Study of clinical outcomes with genomic data

Clinicogenomics, also referred to as clinical genomics, is the study of clinical outcomes with genomic data. Genomic factors have a causal effect on clinical data. Clinicogenomics uses the entire genome of a patient in order to diagnose diseases or adjust medications exclusively for that patient. Whole genome testing can detect more mutations and structural anomalies than targeted gene testing. Furthermore, targeted gene testing can only test for the diseases for which the doctor screens, whereas testing the whole genome screens for all diseases with known markers at once.

== Uses ==
Clinicogenomics is currently used in personalized medicine such as pharmacogenomics and oncogenomics. By studying the whole genome, a physician is able to construct medical plans based on an individual patient's genome rather than generic plans for all patients with the same diagnosis. For example, researchers are able to identify the mutations that cause a particular kind of cancer by studying the genomes of many patients with that cancer type, such as in a study of renal tumors that were previously only diagnosed through morphological anomalies. Furthermore, researchers can identify the medications and treatments that work best on particular cancer-causing mutations, which can then be applied to treat future patients.

Clinicogenomics can also be used in preventative medicine by sequencing a patient's genome prior to a diagnosis in order to identify the known mutations related to medical conditions. In the future, patients could be sequenced at birth and periodically throughout our lives to be cautious of potential health risks and prepare for probable future diagnoses. Through preventative care, patients will be able to change their lifestyles and behaviors to reflect their genetic predisposition to certain conditions. For example, if a woman knows she has mutation in the BRCA1 gene, she can be more proactive about mammograms, Pap smears and other preventative care to help increase her odds of survival despite her likelihood of cancer. By detecting cancer earlier or preventing the development of diseases such as diabetes, health care costs for individuals implementing preventative medicine based on genomic data will decrease.

== Challenges ==
Below are a few of the major challenges facing the usage of clinicogenomics by health care providers today. Other challenges also exist, such as the expense of genome sequence analysis and whether or not insurance companies provide coverage for sequencing.

=== Physician data sharing ===
One of the difficulties of genome testing is the amount of data from a sequence and the dozens of formats in which that data can come. This data needs to be standardized and added to electronic health records. It also needs to be in a format that can be utilized by both health care providers for comparisons, second opinions and future study as well as by machines used for processing the data for further analysis.

=== Patient privacy ===
One of the concerns of utilizing clinicogenomics is the privacy of the patients throughout the process of collecting the DNA, analyzing the genome, and delivering the interpreted data to health care providers. In a study using HIV patients, the researchers encrypted the raw genetic data prior to analysis in order to maintain the anonymity of the patient. Then, a scientist without any previous knowledge of the patient interpreted the encrypted data. A report was produced and given to the physician for further study if applicable.
