= Angiopoietin receptor =

Cell-surface receptors which bind angiopoietin

Identifiers
- Symbol: TIE
- Pfam: PF10430
- InterPro: IPR018941
- Membranome: 1214
Available protein structures:
- PDB: IPR018941 PF10430 (ECOD; PDBsum)
- AlphaFold: IPR018941; PF10430

tyrosine kinase with immunoglobulin-like and EGF-like domains 1

Identifiers
- Symbol: TIE1
- Alt. symbols: TIE, JTK14
- NCBI gene: 7075
- HGNC: 11809
- OMIM: 600222
- RefSeq: NM_005424
- UniProt: P35590

Other data
- EC number: 2.7.1.112
- Locus: Chr. 1 p34-p33
Search for
- Structures: Swiss-model
- Domains: InterPro

TEK tyrosine kinase, endothelial

Identifiers
- Symbol: TEK
- Alt. symbols: TIE2, TIE-2, VMCM1, CD202b
- NCBI gene: 7010
- HGNC: 11724
- OMIM: 600221
- RefSeq: NM_000459
- UniProt: Q02763

Other data
- Locus: Chr. 9 p21
Search for
- Structures: Swiss-model
- Domains: InterPro

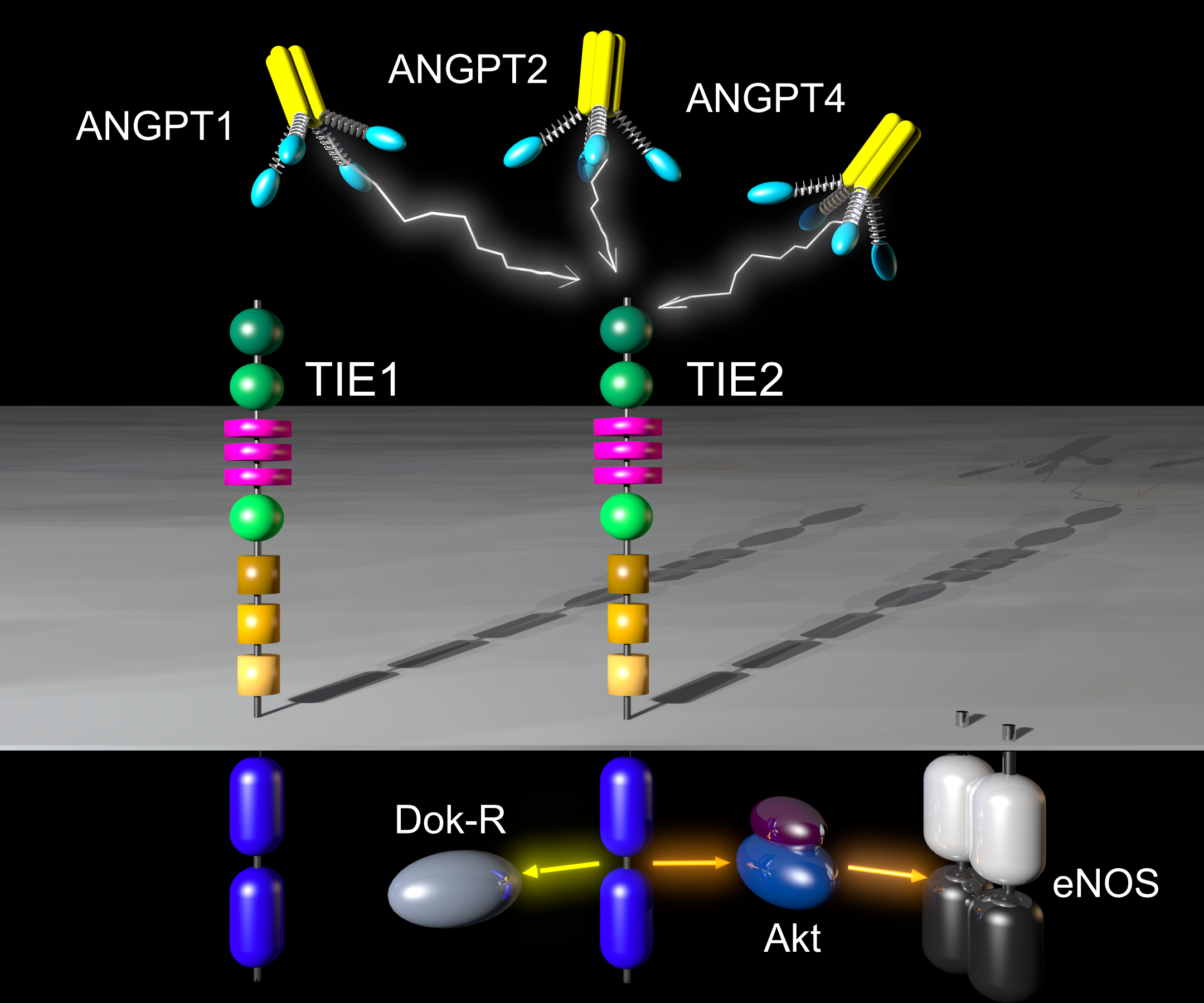
ANGPT1, ANGPT2, and ANGPT4 activate TIE-2. Intracellular signal transduction can proceed via DOK-R (yellow arrow) or alternatively via Akt to eNOS (orange arrow).

The angiopoietin receptors are receptors that bind angiopoietin. TIE-1 and TIE-2 comprise the cell-surface receptors that bind and are activated by the angiopoietins, (Ang1, Ang2, Ang3, Ang4). The angiopoietins are protein growth factors required for the formation of blood vessels (angiogenesis).

== Angiopoietins ==
The angiopoietins are protein growth factors that regulate angiogenesis, the formation of blood vessels. In humans, three angiopoietins have been identified: Ang1, Ang2, and Ang4 (Ang 3 is the mouse ortholog of human Ang4). Ang1 and Ang4 function as agonistic or activating ligands for Tie2, whereas Ang2 and Ang3 behave as competitive antagonists. They function by binding their physiologic receptors, Tie-1 and Tie-2. These are receptor tyrosine kinases, so named because they mediate cell signals by inducing the phosphorylation of key tyrosines, thus initiating cell signalling.

It is somewhat controversial which of the Tie receptors mediate functional signals downstream of Ang stimulation. But it is clear that at least Tie-2 is capable of physiologic activation as a result of binding the angiopoietins.

== See also ==
- Angiopoietin § Tie pathway
