= Microvasculature remodeling =

Alterations of vascular wall structures, often leading to elevated vascular resistance

Microvasculature remodeling refers to the alterations in a blood vessel network resulting from arteriogenesis and angiogenesis. Briefly, arteriogenesis is an increase in arterial diameter while angiogenesis is an increase in the number of capillaries either by sprouting from or splitting existing capillaries. External events stimulate these two types of vessel growth through a combination of mechanical and chemical pathways (Prior et al., 2004).

== Sources ==
1. Prior, B. M., Yang, H. T., & Terjung, R. L. What makes vessels grow with exercise training? J App Physiol 97: 1119–28, 2004.
