= Angiopoietin 4 =

Protein-coding gene in the species Homo sapiens

ANGPT4

Identifiers
- Aliases: ANGPT4, AGP4, ANG-3, ANG4, ANG3, angiopoietin 4
- External IDs: OMIM: 603705; MGI: 1336887; GeneCards: ANGPT4

Gene location (Human)
Chr.	Chromosome 20 (human)
Band	20p13	Start	869,900 bp
Band	20p13	End	916,334 bp

Gene location (Mouse)
Chr.	Chromosome 2 (mouse)
Band	2 G3|2 74.83 cM	Start	151,753,130 bp
Band	2 G3|2 74.83 cM	End	151,787,257 bp
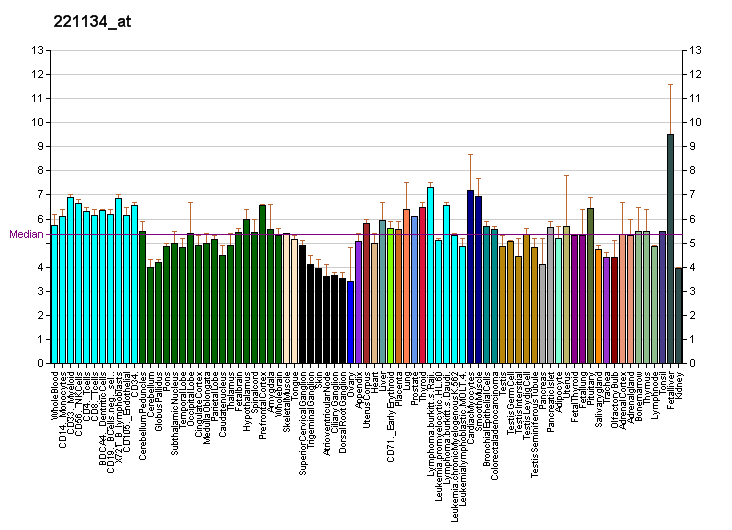
RNA expression pattern
Bgee	Human / Mouse (ortholog); Top expressed in: subcutaneous adipose tissue; left uterine tube; right ovary; canal of the cervix; popliteal artery; tibial arteries; body of uterus; left ovary; ectocervix; right coronary artery / Top expressed in: decidua; stroma of bone marrow; gastrula; body of femur; lip; molar; efferent ductule; vas deferens; skin of external ear; abdominal wall; More reference expression data
BioGPS	More reference expression data
Gene ontology
Molecular function	receptor tyrosine kinase binding; transmembrane receptor protein tyrosine kinase activator activity
Cellular component	extracellular region; extracellular space
Biological process	Notch signaling pathway; positive regulation of endothelial cell migration; negative regulation of angiogenesis; negative regulation of apoptotic process; negative regulation of blood vessel endothelial cell migration; cellular response to hypoxia; endothelial cell proliferation; angiogenesis; positive regulation of blood vessel endothelial cell migration; leukocyte migration; positive regulation of angiogenesis; positive regulation of peptidyl-tyrosine phosphorylation; activation of transmembrane receptor protein tyrosine kinase activity
Sources:Amigo / QuickGO
Orthologs
Databases	NCBI: entry; OMA: entry
Species	Human	Mouse
Entrez	51378	11602
Ensembl	ENSG00000101280	ENSMUSG00000027460
UniProt	Q9Y264	Q9WVH6
RefSeq (mRNA)	NM_015985; NM_001322809	NM_009641
RefSeq (protein)	NP_001309738; NP_057069	NP_033771
Location (UCSC)	Chr 20: 0.87 – 0.92 Mb	Chr 2: 151.75 – 151.79 Mb
PubMed search
- Wikidata
View/Edit Human	View/Edit Mouse

Angiopoietin-4 is a protein that in humans is encoded by the ANGPT4 gene.

Angiopoietins are proteins with important roles in vascular development and angiogenesis. All angiopoietins bind with similar affinity to an endothelial cell-specific tyrosine-protein kinase receptor. The mechanism by which they contribute to angiogenesis is thought to involve regulation of endothelial cell interactions with supporting perivascular cells.

The protein encoded by this gene functions as an agonist and is an angiopoietin.
