= Angiogenesis =

Blood vessel formation, when new vessels emerge from existing vessels

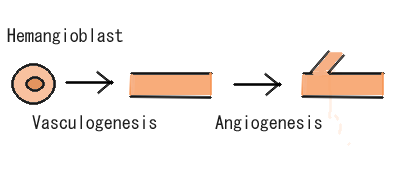
- Angiogenesis following vasculogenesis

Identifiers
- MeSH: D000096482

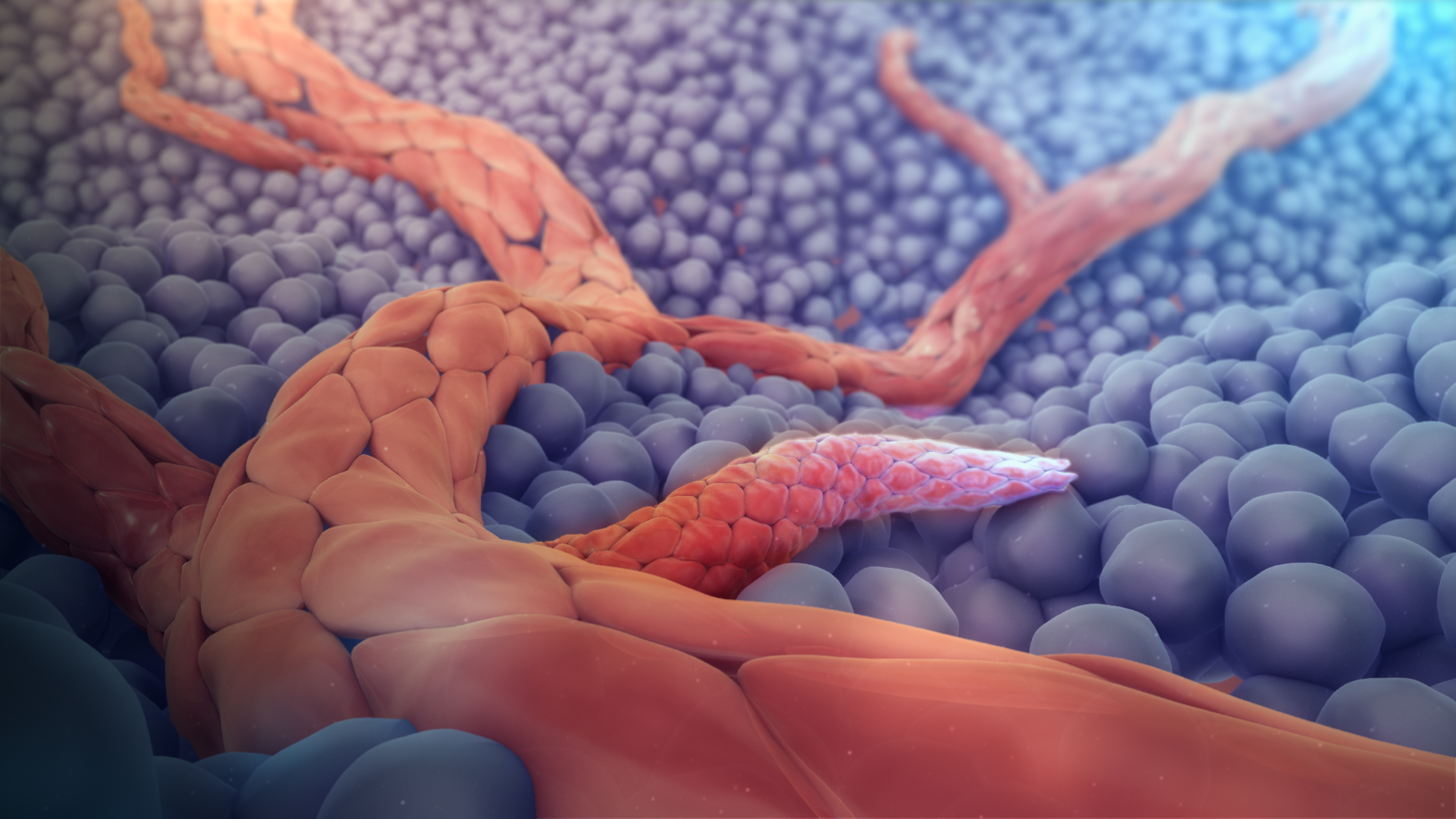
3D medical animation still showing angiogenesis

Angiogenesis is the physiological process through which new blood vessels form from pre-existing vessels, formed in the earlier stage of vasculogenesis. Angiogenesis continues the growth of the vasculature mainly by processes of sprouting and splitting, but processes such as coalescent angiogenesis, vessel elongation and vessel cooption also play a role. Vasculogenesis is the embryonic formation of endothelial cells from mesoderm cell precursors, and from neovascularization, although discussions are not always precise (especially in older texts). The first vessels in the developing embryo form through vasculogenesis, after which angiogenesis is responsible for most, if not all, blood vessel growth during development and in disease.

Angiogenesis is a normal and vital process in growth and development, as well as in wound healing and in the formation of granulation tissue. However, it is also a fundamental step in the transition of tumors from a benign to malignant state, leading to the use of angiogenesis inhibitors in the treatment of cancer. The essential role of angiogenesis in tumor growth was first proposed in 1971 by Judah Folkman, who described tumors as "hot and bloody," illustrating that, at least for many tumor types, flush perfusion and even hyperemia are characteristic.

== Types ==
=== Sprouting angiogenesis ===
Sprouting angiogenesis was the first identified form of angiogenesis and because of this, it is much more understood than intussusceptive angiogenesis. It occurs in several well-characterized stages. The initial signal comes from tissue areas that are devoid of vasculature. The hypoxia that is noted in these areas causes the tissues to demand the presence of nutrients and oxygen that will allow the tissue to carry out metabolic activities. Because of this, parenchymal cells will secrete vascular endothelial growth factor (VEGF-A) which is a proangiogenic growth factor. These biological signals activate receptors on endothelial cells present in pre-existing blood vessels. Second, the activated endothelial cells, also known as tip cells, begin to release enzymes called proteases that degrade the basement membrane to allow endothelial cells to escape from the original (parent) vessel walls. The endothelial cells then proliferate into the surrounding matrix and form solid sprouts connecting neighboring vessels. The cells that are proliferating are located behind the tip cells and are known as stalk cells. The proliferation of these cells allows the capillary sprout to grow in length simultaneously.

As sprouts extend toward the source of the angiogenic stimulus, endothelial cells migrate in tandem, using adhesion molecules called integrins. These sprouts then form loops to become a full-fledged vessel lumen as cells migrate to the site of angiogenesis. Sprouting occurs at a rate of several millimeters per day, and enables new vessels to grow across gaps in the vasculature. It is markedly different from splitting angiogenesis because it forms entirely new vessels as opposed to splitting existing vessels.

=== Intussusceptive angiogenesis ===
Intussusceptive angiogenesis, also known as splitting angiogenesis, is the formation of a new blood vessel by splitting an existing blood vessel into two.

Intussusception was first observed in neonatal rats. In this type of vessel formation, the capillary wall extends into the lumen to split a single vessel in two. There are four phases of intussusceptive angiogenesis. First, the two opposing capillary walls establish a zone of contact. Second, the endothelial cell junctions are reorganized and the vessel bilayer is perforated to allow growth factors and cells to penetrate into the lumen. Third, a core is formed between the 2 new vessels at the zone of contact that is filled with pericytes and myofibroblasts. These cells begin laying collagen fibers into the core to provide an extracellular matrix for growth of the vessel lumen. Finally, the core is fleshed out with no alterations to the basic structure. Intussusception is important because it is a reorganization of existing cells. It allows a vast increase in the number of capillaries without a corresponding increase in the number of endothelial cells. This is especially important in embryonic development as there are not enough resources to create a rich microvasculature with new cells every time a new vessel develops.

=== Coalescent angiogenesis ===
Coalescent angiogenesis is a mode of angiogenesis, considered to be the opposite of intussusceptive angiogenesis, where capillaries fuse, or coalesce, to make a larger bloodvessel, thereby increasing blood flow and circulation. Coalescent angiogenesis has extended out of the domain of embryology. It is assumed to play a role in the formation of neovasculature, such as in a tumor.

== Physiology ==
=== Mechanical stimulation ===
Mechanical stimulation of angiogenesis is not well characterized. There is a significant amount of controversy with regard to shear stress acting on capillaries to cause angiogenesis, although current knowledge suggests that increased muscle contractions may increase angiogenesis. This may be due to an increase in the production of nitric oxide during exercise. Nitric oxide results in vasodilation of blood vessels. Beyond fluid shear stress, the water channel AQP1 contributes to the mechanical expansion of the cell membrane during migration. By facilitating localized water influx at the leading edge, AQP1 creates the hydrostatic pressure necessary to drive membrane protrusions, which is a critical physical step in the formation of new vascular sprouts.

=== Chemical stimulation ===
Chemical stimulation of angiogenesis is performed by various angiogenic proteins e.g. integrins and prostaglandins, including several growth factors e.g. VEGF, FGF.

==== Overview ====
Stimulator	Mechanism
FGF	Promotes proliferation & differentiation of endothelial cells, smooth muscle cells, and fibroblasts
VEGF	Affects permeability
VEGFR and NRP-1	Integrate survival signals
Ang1 and Ang2	Stabilize vessels
PDGF (BB-homodimer) and PDGFR	recruit smooth muscle cells
TGF-β, endoglin and TGF-β receptors	↑extracellular matrix production
CCL2	Recruits lymphocytes to sites of inflammation
Histamine	
Integrins α_{V}β_{3}, α_{V}β_{5} (?) and α_{5}β_{1}	Bind matrix macromolecules and proteinases
VE-cadherin and CD31	endothelial junctional molecules
ephrin	Determine formation of arteries or veins
plasminogen activators	remodels extracellular matrix, releases and activates growth factors
plasminogen activator inhibitor-1	stabilizes nearby vessels
eNOS and COX-2	
AC133	regulates angioblast differentiation
ID1/ID3	Regulates endothelial transdifferentiation
Class 3 semaphorins	Modulates endothelial cell adhesion, migration, proliferation and apoptosis. Alters vascular permeability
Nogo-A	Regulates endothelial cell migration and proliferation. Alters vascular permeability.

==== FGF ====
The fibroblast growth factor (FGF) family with its prototype members FGF-1 (acidic FGF) and FGF-2 (basic FGF) consists to date of at least 22 known members. Most are single-chain peptides of 16-18 kDa and display high affinity to heparin and heparan sulfate. In general, FGFs stimulate a variety of cellular functions by binding to cell surface FGF-receptors in the presence of heparin proteoglycans. The FGF-receptor family is composed of seven members, and all the receptor proteins are single-chain receptor tyrosine kinases that become activated through autophosphorylation induced by a mechanism of FGF-mediated receptor dimerization. Receptor activation gives rise to a signal transduction cascade that leads to gene activation and diverse biological responses, including cell differentiation, proliferation, and matrix dissolution, thus initiating a process of mitogenic activity critical for the growth of endothelial cells, fibroblasts, and smooth muscle cells. FGF-1, unique among all 22 members of the FGF family, can bind to all seven FGF-receptor subtypes, making it the broadest-acting member of the FGF family, and a potent mitogen for the diverse cell types needed to mount an angiogenic response in damaged (hypoxic) tissues, where upregulation of FGF-receptors occurs. FGF-1 stimulates the proliferation and differentiation of all cell types necessary for building an arterial vessel, including endothelial cells and smooth muscle cells; this fact distinguishes FGF-1 from other pro-angiogenic growth factors, such as vascular endothelial growth factor (VEGF), which primarily drives the formation of new capillaries.

Besides FGF-1, one of the most important functions of fibroblast growth factor-2 (FGF-2 or bFGF) is the promotion of endothelial cell proliferation and the physical organization of endothelial cells into tube-like structures, thus promoting angiogenesis. FGF-2 is a more potent angiogenic factor than VEGF or PDGF (platelet-derived growth factor); however, it is less potent than FGF-1. As well as stimulating blood vessel growth, aFGF (FGF-1) and bFGF (FGF-2) are important players in wound healing. They stimulate the proliferation of fibroblasts and endothelial cells that give rise to angiogenesis and developing granulation tissue; both increase blood supply and fill up a wound space/cavity early in the wound-healing process.

==== VEGF ====
Vascular endothelial growth factor (VEGF) has been demonstrated to be a major contributor to angiogenesis, increasing the number of capillaries in a given network. Initial in vitro studies demonstrated bovine capillary endothelial cells will proliferate and show signs of tube structures upon stimulation by VEGF and bFGF, although the results were more pronounced with VEGF. Upregulation of VEGF is a major component of the physiological response to exercise and its role in angiogenesis is suspected to be a possible treatment in vascular injuries. In vitro studies clearly demonstrate that VEGF is a potent stimulator of angiogenesis because, in the presence of this growth factor, plated endothelial cells will proliferate and migrate, eventually forming tube structures resembling capillaries. VEGF causes a massive signaling cascade in endothelial cells. Binding to VEGF receptor-2 (VEGFR-2) starts a tyrosine kinase signaling cascade that stimulates the production of factors that variously stimulate vessel permeability (eNOS, producing NO), proliferation/survival (bFGF), migration (ICAMs/VCAMs/MMPs) and finally differentiation into mature blood vessels. Mechanically, VEGF is upregulated with muscle contractions as a result of increased blood flow to affected areas. The increased flow also causes a large increase in the mRNA production of VEGF receptors 1 and 2. The increase in receptor production means muscle contractions could cause upregulation of the signaling cascade relating to angiogenesis. As part of the angiogenic signaling cascade, NO is widely considered to be a major contributor to the angiogenic response because inhibition of NO significantly reduces the effects of angiogenic growth factors. However, inhibition of NO during exercise does not inhibit angiogenesis, indicating there are other factors involved in the angiogenic response.

==== Angiopoietins ====
The angiopoietins, Ang1 and Ang2, are required for the formation of mature blood vessels, as demonstrated by mouse knock out studies. Ang1 and Ang2 are protein growth factors which act by binding their receptors, Tie-1 and Tie-2; while this is somewhat controversial, it seems that cell signals are transmitted mostly by Tie-2; though some papers show physiologic signaling via Tie-1 as well. These receptors are tyrosine kinases. Thus, they can initiate cell signaling when ligand binding causes a dimerization that initiates phosphorylation on key tyrosines.

==== MMP ====
Another major contributor to angiogenesis is matrix metalloproteinase (MMP). MMPs help degrade the proteins that keep the vessel walls solid. This proteolysis allows the endothelial cells to escape into the interstitial matrix as seen in sprouting angiogenesis. Inhibition of MMPs prevents the formation of new capillaries. These enzymes are highly regulated during the vessel formation process because destruction of the extracellular matrix would decrease the integrity of the microvasculature.

==== Dll4 ====
Delta-like ligand 4 (Dll4) is a protein with a negative regulatory effect on angiogenesis. Dll4 is a transmembrane ligand, for the notch family of receptors. There have been many studies conducted that have served to determine consequences of the Delta-like Ligand 4. One study in particular evaluated the effects of Dll4 on tumor vascularity and growth. In order for a tumor to grow and develop, it must have the proper vasculature. The VEGF pathway is vital to the development of vasculature that in turn, helps the tumors to grow. The combined blockade of VEGF and Dll4 results in the inhibition of tumor progression and angiogenesis throughout the tumor. This is due to the hindrance of signaling in endothelial cell signaling which cuts off the proliferation and sprouting of these endothelial cells. With this inhibition, the cells do not uncontrollably grow, therefore, the cancer is stopped at this point. if the blockade, however, were to be lifted, the cells would begin their proliferation once again.

==== Class 3 semaphorins ====
Class 3 semaphorins (SEMA3s) regulate angiogenesis by modulating endothelial cell adhesion, migration, proliferation, survival and the recruitment of pericytes. Furthermore, semaphorins can interfere with VEGF-mediated angiogenesis since both SEMA3s and VEGF-A compete for neuropilin receptor binding at endothelial cells. The relative expression levels of SEMA3s and VEGF-A may therefore be important for angiogenesis.

=== Chemical inhibition ===
An angiogenesis inhibitor can be endogenous or come from outside as drug or a dietary component.

== Application in medicine ==
=== Angiogenesis as a therapeutic target ===
Angiogenesis may be a target for combating diseases such as heart disease characterized by either poor vascularisation or abnormal vasculature. Application of specific compounds that may inhibit or induce the creation of new blood vessels in the body may help combat such diseases. The presence of blood vessels where there should be none may affect the mechanical properties of a tissue, increasing the likelihood of failure. The absence of blood vessels in a repairing or otherwise metabolically active tissue may inhibit repair or other essential functions. Several diseases, such as ischemic chronic wounds, are the result of failure or insufficient blood vessel formation and may be treated by a local expansion of blood vessels, thus bringing new nutrients to the site, facilitating repair. Other diseases, such as age-related macular degeneration, may be created by a local expansion of blood vessels, interfering with normal physiological processes.

The modern clinical application of the principle of angiogenesis can be divided into two main areas: anti-angiogenic therapies, which angiogenic research began with, and pro-angiogenic therapies. Whereas anti-angiogenic therapies are being employed to fight cancer and malignancies, which require an abundance of oxygen and nutrients to proliferate, pro-angiogenic therapies are being explored as options to treat cardiovascular diseases, the number one cause of death in the Western world. One of the first applications of pro-angiogenic methods in humans was a German trial using fibroblast growth factor 1 (FGF-1) for the treatment of coronary artery disease.

Regarding the mechanism of action, pro-angiogenic methods can be differentiated into three main categories: gene therapy, targeting genes of interest for amplification or inhibition; protein replacement therapy, which primarily manipulates angiogenic growth factors like FGF-1 or vascular endothelial growth factor, VEGF; and cell-based therapies, which involve the implantation of specific cell types.

There are still serious, unsolved problems related to gene therapy. Difficulties include effective integration of the therapeutic genes into the genome of target cells, reducing the risk of an undesired immune response, potential toxicity, immunogenicity, inflammatory responses, and oncogenesis related to the viral vectors used in implanting genes and the sheer complexity of the genetic basis of angiogenesis. The most commonly occurring disorders in humans, such as heart disease, high blood pressure, diabetes and Alzheimer's disease, are most likely caused by the combined effects of variations in many genes, and, thus, injecting a single gene may not be significantly beneficial in such diseases.

By contrast, pro-angiogenic protein therapy uses well-defined, precisely structured proteins, with previously defined optimal doses of the individual protein for disease states, and with well-known biological effects. On the other hand, an obstacle of protein therapy is the mode of delivery. Oral, intravenous, intra-arterial, or intramuscular routes of protein administration are not always as effective, as the therapeutic protein may be metabolized or cleared before it can enter the target tissue. Cell-based pro-angiogenic therapies are still early stages of research, with many open questions regarding best cell types and dosages to use.

=== Tumor angiogenesis ===
Without angiogenesis a tumor cannot grow beyond a limited size

Cancer cells are cells that have lost their ability to divide in a controlled fashion. A malignant tumor consists of a population of rapidly dividing and growing cancer cells that progressively accrues mutations. However, tumors need a dedicated blood supply to provide the oxygen and other essential nutrients they require in order to grow beyond a certain size (generally 1–2 mm^{3}).

Tumors induce blood vessel growth (angiogenesis) by secreting various growth factors (e.g. VEGF) and proteins. Growth factors such as bFGF and VEGF can induce capillary growth into the tumor, which some researchers suspect supply required nutrients, allowing for tumor expansion. Unlike normal blood vessels, tumor blood vessels are dilated with an irregular shape. Other clinicians believe angiogenesis really serves as a waste pathway, taking away the biological end products secreted by rapidly dividing cancer cells. In either case, angiogenesis is a necessary and required step for transition from a small harmless cluster of cells, often said to be about the size of the metal ball at the end of a ball-point pen, to a large tumor. Angiogenesis is also required for the spread of a tumor, or metastasis. Single cancer cells can break away from an established solid tumor, enter the blood vessel, and be carried to a distant site, where they can implant and begin the growth of a secondary tumor. Evidence now suggests the blood vessel in a given solid tumor may, in fact, be mosaic vessels, composed of endothelial cells and tumor cells. This mosaicity allows for substantial shedding of tumor cells into the vasculature, possibly contributing to the appearance of circulating tumor cells in the peripheral blood of patients with malignancies. The subsequent growth of such metastases will also require a supply of nutrients and oxygen and a waste disposal pathway.

Endothelial cells have long been considered genetically more stable than cancer cells. This genomic stability confers an advantage to targeting endothelial cells using anti-angiogenic therapy, compared to chemotherapy directed at cancer cells, which rapidly mutate and acquire drug resistance to treatment. Thus, endothelial cells are thought to be an ideal target for therapies against cancer.. Currently, there have been multiple clinical trials using anti-angiogenic therapies in combination with other therapeutic agents (e.g chemotherapy for treatment of various cancers.

=== Formation of tumor blood vessels ===
The mechanism of blood vessel formation by angiogenesis is initiated by the spontaneous dividing of tumor cells due to a mutation. Angiogenic stimulators are then released by the tumor cells. These then travel to already established, nearby blood vessels and activates their endothelial cell receptors. This induces a release of proteolytic enzymes from the vasculature. These enzymes target a particular point on the blood vessel and cause a pore to form. This is the point where the new blood vessel will grow from. The reason tumour cells need a blood supply is because they cannot grow any more than 2-3 millimeters in diameter without an established blood supply which is equivalent to about 50-100 cells. Certain studies have indicated that vessels formed inside the tumor tissue are of higher irregularity and bigger in size, which is as well associated with poorer prognosis.

=== Angiogenesis for cardiovascular disease ===
Angiogenesis represents a therapeutic target for the treatment of cardiovascular disease. It is a potent, physiological process that underlies the natural manner in which our bodies respond to a diminution of blood supply to vital organs, namely neoangiogenesis: the production of new collateral vessels to overcome the ischemic insult. A large number of preclinical studies have been performed with protein-, gene- and cell-based therapies in animal models of cardiac ischemia, as well as models of peripheral artery disease. Reproducible and credible successes in these early animal studies led to optimism that this new therapeutic approach could be rapidly translated to a clinical benefit for patients with these disorders. A decade of clinical testing both gene- and protein-based therapies designed to stimulate angiogenesis in underperfused tissues and organs, however, has led from one disappointment to another. Although all of these preclinical readouts, which offered great promise for the transition of angiogenesis therapy from animals to humans, were in one fashion or another, incorporated into early stage clinical trials, the FDA has, to date (2007), insisted that the primary endpoint for approval of an angiogenic agent must be an improvement in exercise performance of treated patients.

These failures suggested that either these are the wrong molecular targets to induce neovascularization, that they can only be effectively used if formulated and administered correctly, or that their presentation in the context of the overall cellular microenvironment may play a vital role in their utility. It may be necessary to present these proteins in a way that mimics natural signaling events, including the concentration, spatial and temporal profiles, and their simultaneous or sequential presentation with other appropriate factors.

=== Exercise ===
Early experimental evidence that skeletal muscle contraction induces vascular endothelial growth factor (VEGF) expression came from studies using electrically stimulated muscle. In a rat model, Hang et al. (1995) demonstrated that electrically stimulated skeletal muscle exhibited significant upregulation of VEGF expression, establishing skeletal muscle fibers as an active source of angiogenic signaling. This work preceded later exercise-training studies and contributed to the understanding of VEGF as a contraction-responsive factor involved in skeletal muscle angiogenesis.

Angiogenesis is generally associated with aerobic exercise and endurance exercise. While arteriogenesis produces network changes that enable a large increase in total flow, angiogenesis produces changes that enable greater nutrient delivery over a longer period. Capillaries are designed to provide maximum nutrient delivery efficiency, so an increase in the number of capillaries allows the network to deliver more nutrients in the same amount of time. A greater number of capillaries also allows for greater oxygen exchange in the network. This is vitally important to endurance training, because it allows a person to continue training for an extended period of time. However, no experimental evidence suggests that increased capillarity is required in endurance exercise to increase the maximum oxygen delivery.

=== Macular degeneration ===
Overexpression of VEGF causes increased permeability in blood vessels in addition to stimulating angiogenesis. In wet macular degeneration, VEGF causes proliferation of capillaries into the retina. Since the increase in angiogenesis also causes edema, blood and other retinal fluids leak into the retina, causing loss of vision. Anti-angiogenic drugs targeting the VEGF pathways are now used successfully to treat this type of macular degeneration

=== Tissue engineered constructs ===
Angiogenesis of vessels from the host body into an implanted tissue engineered constructs is essential. Successful integration is often dependent on thorough vascularisation of the construct as it provides oxygen and nutrients and prevents necrosis in the central areas of the implant. PDGF has been shown to stabilize vascularisation in collagen-glycosaminoglycan scaffolds.

== History ==
The first report of angiogenesis can be traced back to the book A treatise on the blood, inflammation, and gun-shot wounds published in 1794, where Scottish anatomist John Hunter's research findings were compiled. In his study, Hunter observed the growth process of new blood vessels in rabbits. However, he did not coin the term "Angiogenesis," which is now widely used by scholars. Hunter also erroneously attributed the growth process of new blood vessels to the effect of an innate vital principle within the blood. The term "angiogenesis" is believed to have emerged not until the 1900s. The inception of modern angiogenesis research is marked by Judah Folkman's report on the pivotal role of angiogenesis in tumor growth.

== Quantification ==
Quantifying vasculature parameters such as microvascular density has various complications due to preferential staining or limited representation of tissues by histological sections. Recent research has shown complete 3D reconstruction of tumor vascular structure and quantification of vessel structures in whole tumors in animal models.

== See also ==
- Aerobic exercise
- Angiogenin
- The Angiogenesis Foundation
- Arteriogenesis
- COL41
- Neuroangiogenesis
- Proteases in angiogenesis
- Vasculogenic mimicry
