= Angiopoietin-related protein 1 =

Protein found in humans

ANGPTL1

Identifiers
- Aliases: ANGPTL1, ANG3, ANGPT3, ARP1, AngY, UNQ162, dJ595C2.2, angiopoietin like 1
- External IDs: OMIM: 603874; MGI: 1919963; GeneCards: ANGPTL1

Gene location (Human)
Chr.	Chromosome 1 (human)
Band	1q25.2	Start	178,849,535 bp
Band	1q25.2	End	178,871,077 bp

Gene location (Mouse)
Chr.	Chromosome 1 (mouse)
Band	1|1 G3	Start	156,666,132 bp
Band	1|1 G3	End	156,688,648 bp
RNA expression pattern
Bgee	Human / Mouse (ortholog); Top expressed in: left uterine tube; smooth muscle tissue; Achilles tendon; tendon of biceps brachii; popliteal artery; tibial arteries; muscle layer of sigmoid colon; right ovary; left coronary artery; Descending thoracic aorta / Top expressed in: basilar part of occipital bone; intercostal muscle; squamous epithelium; condyle; mesothelium; mesothelium of peritoneum; rib; human fetus; sphenoid bone; dermis; More reference expression data
BioGPS	n/a
Gene ontology
Molecular function	signaling receptor binding
Cellular component	extracellular exosome; extracellular region; extracellular space
Biological process	transmembrane receptor protein tyrosine kinase signaling pathway
Sources:Amigo / QuickGO
Orthologs
Databases	NCBI: entry; OMA: entry
Species	Human	Mouse
Entrez	9068	72713
Ensembl	ENSG00000116194	ENSMUSG00000033544
UniProt	O95841	Q640P2
RefSeq (mRNA)	NM_004673; NM_001376763	NM_028333
RefSeq (protein)	NP_004664; NP_001363692	NP_082609
Location (UCSC)	Chr 1: 178.85 – 178.87 Mb	Chr 1: 156.67 – 156.69 Mb
PubMed search
- Wikidata
View/Edit Human	View/Edit Mouse

Angiopoietin-related protein 1 also known as angiopoietin-3 (ANG-3) is a protein that in humans is encoded by the ANGPTL1 gene.

== Function ==
Angiopoietins are members of the vascular endothelial growth factor family and the only known growth factors largely specific for vascular endothelium. Angiopoietin-1, angiopoietin-2, and angiopoietin-4 participate in the formation of blood vessels.

The protein encoded by this gene is another member of the angiopoietin family that is widely expressed in adult tissues with mRNA levels highest in highly vascularized tissues. This protein was found to be a secretory protein that does not act as an endothelial cell mitogen in vitro.
