= DOK2 =

Protein-coding gene in the species Homo sapiens

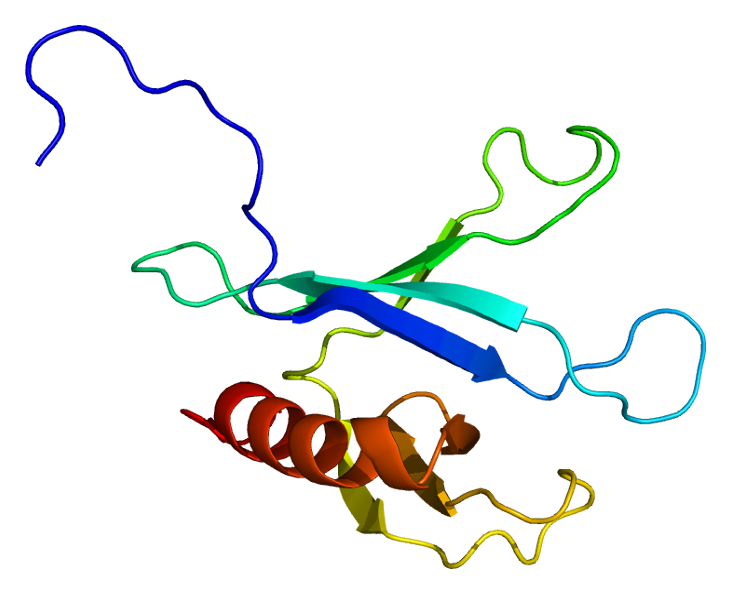

Identifiers
- Aliases: DOK2, p56DOK, p56dok-2, docking protein 2
- External IDs: OMIM: 604997; MGI: 1332623; GeneCards: DOK2
Available structures
PDB	Ortholog search: PDBe RCSB
PDB	List of PDB id codes 2D9W, 2DLW

Gene location (Human)
Chr.	Chromosome 8 (human)
Band	8p21.3	Start	21,908,873 bp
Band	8p21.3	End	21,913,690 bp

Gene location (Mouse)
Chr.	Chromosome 14 (mouse)
Band	14 D2|14 36.71 cM	Start	70,766,036 bp
Band	14 D2|14 36.71 cM	End	70,778,495 bp
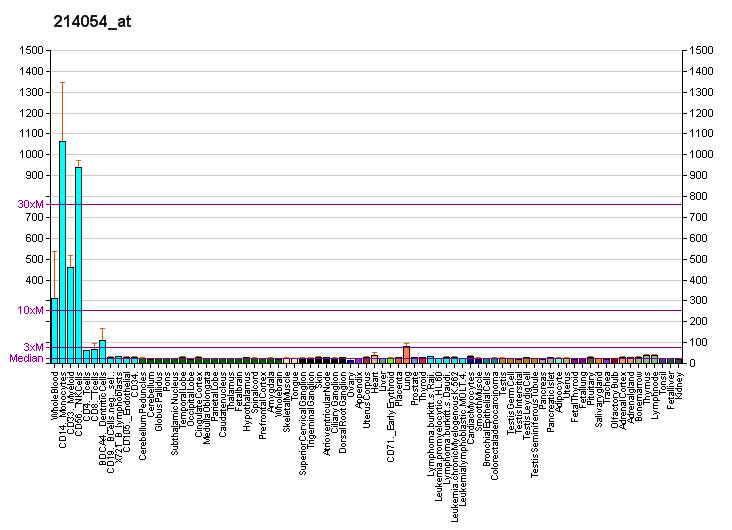
RNA expression pattern
Bgee	Human / Mouse (ortholog); Top expressed in: granulocyte; monocyte; blood; spleen; lymph node; appendix; upper lobe of left lung; testicle; lower lobe of lung; right lung / Top expressed in: granulocyte; thymus; tibiofemoral joint; blood; spleen; morula; embryo; embryo; lymph node; fetal liver hematopoietic progenitor cell; More reference expression data
BioGPS	More reference expression data
Gene ontology
Molecular function	protein binding; transmembrane receptor protein tyrosine kinase adaptor activity
Cellular component	cytosol
Biological process	cell surface receptor signaling pathway; Ras protein signal transduction; leukocyte migration; signal transduction; transmembrane receptor protein tyrosine kinase signaling pathway; axon guidance
Sources:Amigo / QuickGO
Orthologs
Databases	NCBI: entry; OMA: entry
Species	Human	Mouse
Entrez	9046	13449
Ensembl	ENSG00000147443	ENSMUSG00000022102
UniProt	O60496	O70469
RefSeq (mRNA)	NM_003974; NM_201349; NM_001317800; NM_001401272	NM_010071
RefSeq (protein)	NP_001304729; NP_003965; NP_958728	NP_034201; NP_001388209; NP_001388210
Location (UCSC)	Chr 8: 21.91 – 21.91 Mb	Chr 14: 70.77 – 70.78 Mb
PubMed search
- Wikidata
View/Edit Human	View/Edit Mouse

Docking protein 2 is a protein that in humans is encoded by the DOK2 gene.

== Function ==
The protein encoded by this gene is constitutively tyrosine phosphorylated in hematopoietic progenitors isolated from chronic myelogenous leukemia (CML) patients in the chronic phase. It may be a critical substrate for p210(bcr/abl), a chimeric protein whose presence is associated with CML. This encoded protein binds p120 (RasGAP) from CML cells.

== Interactions ==
DOK2 has been shown to interact with INPP5D and TEK tyrosine kinase.
