= Angiopoietin 2 =

Protein-coding gene in the species Homo sapiens

ANGPT2
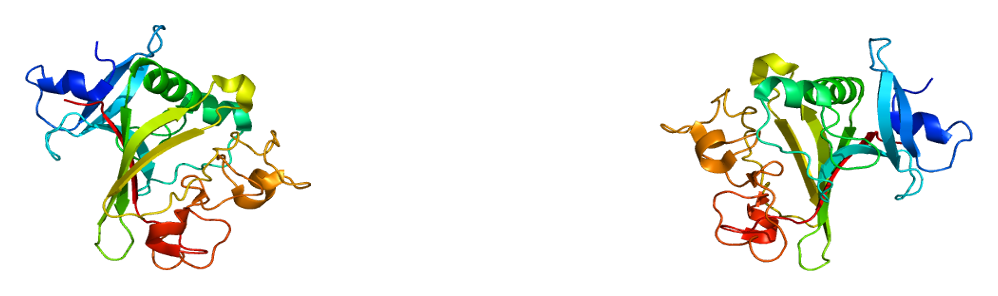

Identifiers
- Aliases: ANGPT2, AGPT2, ANG2, angiopoietin 2, LMPHM10
- External IDs: OMIM: 601922; MGI: 1202890; GeneCards: ANGPT2
Available structures
PDB	Ortholog search: PDBe RCSB
PDB	List of PDB id codes 1Z3S, 1Z3U, 2GY7, 4JZC, 4ZFG

Gene location (Human)
Chr.	Chromosome 8 (human)
Band	8p23.1	Start	6,499,632 bp
Band	8p23.1	End	6,563,409 bp

Gene location (Mouse)
Chr.	Chromosome 8 (mouse)
Band	8 A1.3|8 10.3 cM	Start	18,740,279 bp
Band	8 A1.3|8 10.3 cM	End	18,791,578 bp
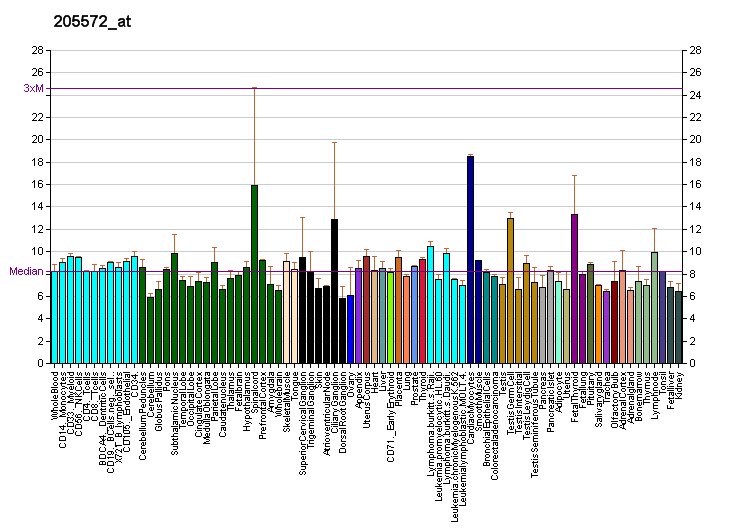

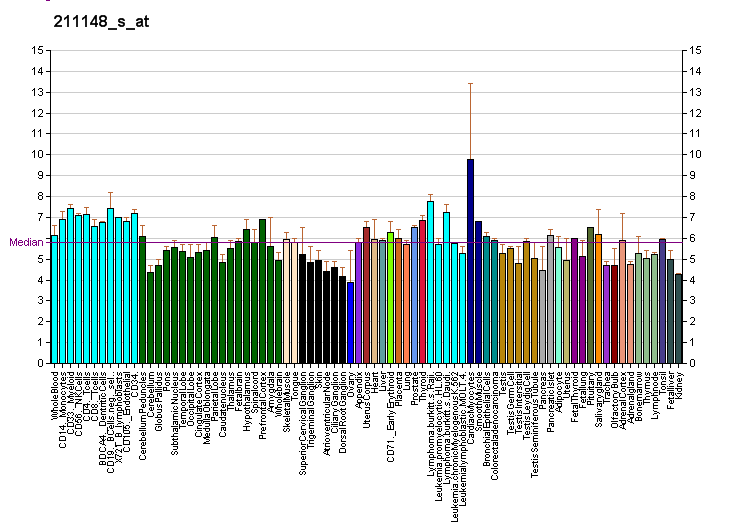
RNA expression pattern
Bgee	Human / Mouse (ortholog); Top expressed in: tendon of biceps brachii; popliteal artery; tibial arteries; placenta; islet of Langerhans; visceral pleura; subcutaneous adipose tissue; pericardium; internal globus pallidus; buccal mucosa cell / Top expressed in: gastrula; endothelial cell of lymphatic vessel; decidua; lumbar spinal ganglion; external carotid artery; internal carotid artery; ascending aorta; umbilical cord; stroma of kidney; stroma of bone marrow; More reference expression data
BioGPS	More reference expression data
Gene ontology
Molecular function	metal ion binding; signaling receptor binding; protein binding; receptor tyrosine kinase binding
Cellular component	cell projection; nucleus; plasma membrane; extracellular region; extracellular space
Biological process	angiogenesis; response to hypoxia; response to mechanical stimulus; negative regulation of positive chemotaxis; response to radiation; negative regulation of cell-substrate adhesion; signal transduction; animal organ regeneration; response to activity; Tie signaling pathway; cellular response to growth factor stimulus; multicellular organism development; maternal process involved in female pregnancy; negative regulation of angiogenesis; response to organic cyclic compound; leukocyte migration; negative regulation of blood vessel endothelial cell migration; blood vessel morphogenesis; germ cell development; positive regulation of angiogenesis; response to glucose; cell differentiation; glomerulus vasculature development
Sources:Amigo / QuickGO
Orthologs
Databases	NCBI: entry; OMA: entry
Species	Human	Mouse
Entrez	285	11601
Ensembl	ENSG00000091879	ENSMUSG00000031465
UniProt	O15123	O35608
RefSeq (mRNA)	NM_001147; NM_001118887; NM_001118888; NM_001386335; NM_001386336 NM_001386337	NM_007426
RefSeq (protein)	NP_001112359; NP_001112360; NP_001138	NP_031452
Location (UCSC)	Chr 8: 6.5 – 6.56 Mb	Chr 8: 18.74 – 18.79 Mb
PubMed search
- Wikidata
View/Edit Human	View/Edit Mouse

Angiopoietin-2 is a protein that in humans is encoded by the ANGPT2 gene.

Naturally occurring antagonist for both ANGPT1 and TIE2; expressed only at the sites of vascular remodeling; similar to angiopoietin-1

== Function ==
- See Angiopoietin#Clinical relevance

== Interactions ==
ANGPT2 has been shown to interact with TEK tyrosine kinase.

== See also ==
- Angiopoietin
