= Angiopoietin-1 receptor =

Protein-coding gene in the species Homo sapiens

TEK
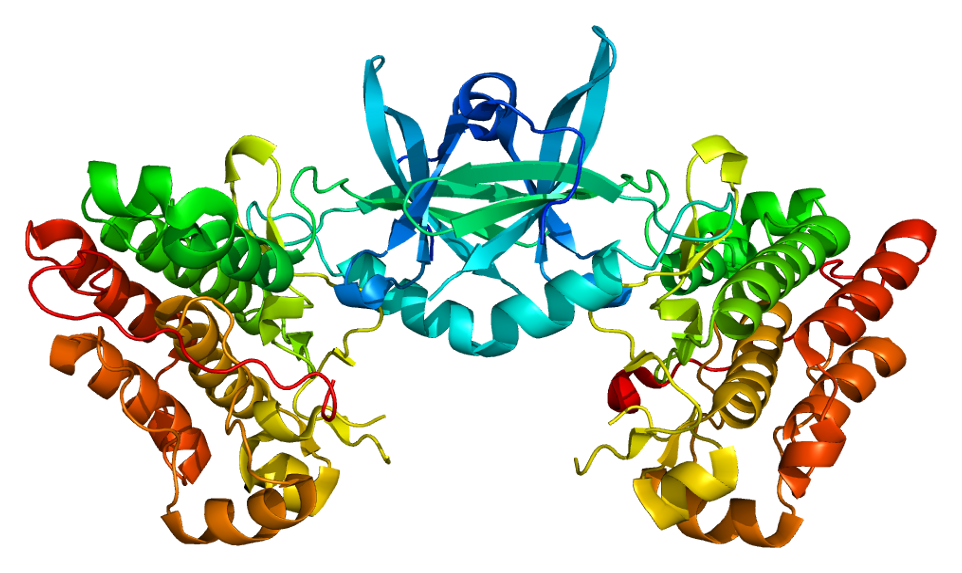

Identifiers
- Aliases: TEK, CD202B, TIE-2, TIE2, VMCM, VMCM1, TEK tyrosine kinase, TEK receptor tyrosine kinase, GLC3E
- External IDs: OMIM: 600221; MGI: 98664; GeneCards: TEK
Available structures
PDB	Ortholog search: PDBe RCSB
PDB	List of PDB id codes 4K0V, 1FVR, 2GY5, 2GY7, 2OO8, 2OSC, 2P4I, 2WQB, 3L8P, 4X3J
Enzyme activity
EC #	BRENDA	ExPASy	KEGG	MetaCyc
2.7.10.1	↗	↗	↗	↗

Gene location (Human)
Chr.	Chromosome 9 (human)
Band	9p21.2	Start	27,109,141 bp
Band	9p21.2	End	27,230,174 bp

Gene location (Mouse)
Chr.	Chromosome 4 (mouse)
Band	4 C5|4 43.34 cM	Start	94,627,526 bp
Band	4 C5|4 43.34 cM	End	94,763,213 bp
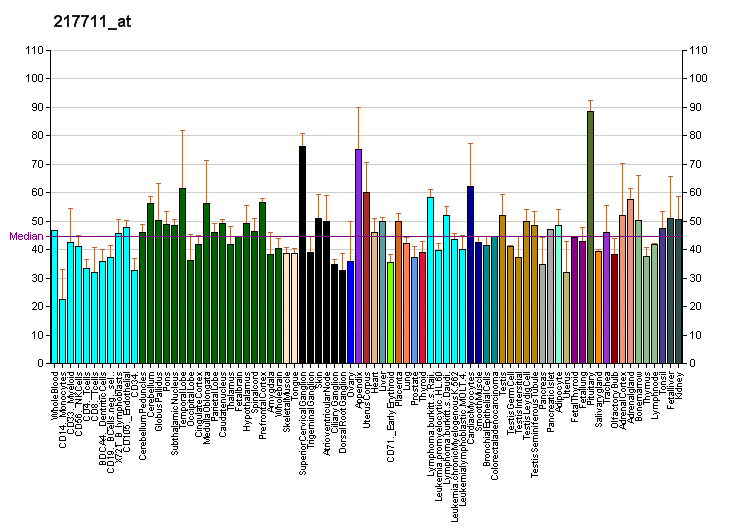

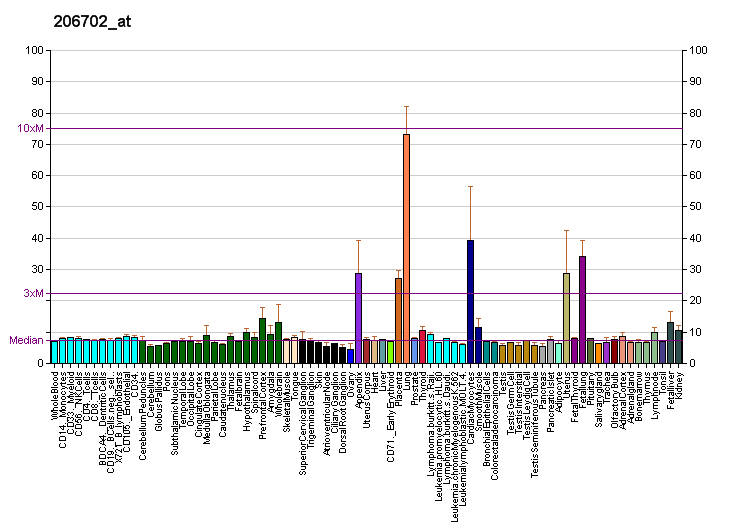
RNA expression pattern
Bgee	Human / Mouse (ortholog); Top expressed in: right lung; visceral pleura; upper lobe of left lung; oocyte; parietal pleura; secondary oocyte; lower lobe of lung; subcutaneous adipose tissue; metanephric glomerulus; placenta / Top expressed in: Vasculature of brain; right lung; right lung lobe; left lung; atrium; left lung lobe; atrioventricular valve; semi-lunar valve; aortic valve; endocardial cushion; More reference expression data
BioGPS	More reference expression data
Gene ontology
Molecular function	transferase activity; protein kinase activity; nucleotide binding; kinase activity; protein binding; transmembrane receptor protein tyrosine kinase activity; protein tyrosine kinase activity; ATP binding; signaling receptor activity; growth factor binding; receptor tyrosine kinase; transmembrane signaling receptor activity
Cellular component	cytoplasm; integral component of membrane; membrane; cell-cell junction; focal adhesion; integral component of plasma membrane; stress fiber; extracellular region; microvillus; cell surface; basal plasma membrane; cell junction; basolateral plasma membrane; apical plasma membrane; actin filament; membrane raft; cytoskeleton; microtubule organizing center; plasma membrane; receptor complex
Biological process	negative regulation of endothelial cell apoptotic process; positive regulation of protein kinase B signaling; positive regulation of protein phosphorylation; response to hypoxia; positive regulation of endothelial cell proliferation; heart trabecula formation; phosphorylation; transmembrane receptor protein tyrosine kinase signaling pathway; regulation of endothelial cell apoptotic process; cell-cell signaling; response to peptide hormone; sprouting angiogenesis; negative regulation of apoptotic process; endochondral ossification; positive regulation of intracellular signal transduction; response to organic substance; positive regulation of angiogenesis; MAPK cascade; positive regulation of phosphatidylinositol 3-kinase activity; positive regulation of endothelial cell migration; response to estrogen; development of the heart; regulation of vascular permeability; protein phosphorylation; protein complex oligomerization; endothelial cell proliferation; angiogenesis; Tie signaling pathway; positive regulation of ERK1 and ERK2 cascade; negative regulation of angiogenesis; protein autophosphorylation; positive regulation of focal adhesion assembly; regulation of establishment or maintenance of cell polarity; positive regulation of phosphatidylinositol 3-kinase signaling; peptidyl-tyrosine phosphorylation; substrate adhesion-dependent cell spreading; response to cAMP; definitive hemopoiesis; positive regulation of actin cytoskeleton reorganization; negative regulation of inflammatory response; leukocyte migration; signal transduction; glomerulus vasculature development; negative regulation of signal transduction; cell differentiation
Sources:Amigo / QuickGO
Orthologs
Databases	NCBI: entry; OMA: entry
Species	Human	Mouse
Entrez	7010	21687
Ensembl	ENSG00000120156	ENSMUSG00000006386
UniProt	Q02763	Q02858
RefSeq (mRNA)	NM_000459; NM_001290077; NM_001290078; NM_001375475; NM_001375476	NM_001290549; NM_001290551; NM_013690
RefSeq (protein)	NP_000450; NP_001277006; NP_001277007; NP_001362404; NP_001362405	NP_001277478; NP_001277480; NP_038718
Location (UCSC)	Chr 9: 27.11 – 27.23 Mb	Chr 4: 94.63 – 94.76 Mb
PubMed search
- Wikidata
View/Edit Human	View/Edit Mouse

Angiopoietin-1 receptor is an angiopoietin receptor protein that in humans is encoded by the TEK gene. TEK is also known as TEK tyrosine kinase, TIE2 and CD202B (cluster of differentiation 202B).

== Function ==
The TEK receptor tyrosine kinase is expressed almost exclusively in endothelial cells in mice, rats, and humans. (TEK is closely related to the TIE receptor tyrosine kinase.)

This receptor possesses a unique extracellular domain containing 2 immunoglobulin-like loops separated by 3 epidermal growth factor-like repeats that are connected to 3 fibronectin type III-like repeats. The ligand for the receptor is angiopoietin-1. TEK has also been suggested as a marker for nucleus pulposus progenitor cells, from the intervertebral disc, which upon activation by Angiopoietin-1 starts to multiply and differentiate.

Defects in TEK are associated with inherited venous malformations; the TEK signaling pathway appears to be critical for endothelial cell-smooth muscle cell communication in venous morphogenesis.

In cancer patients, TEK (Tie2) is expressed in a subpopulation of monocytes that home in on the tumor and are essential for the formation of new blood vessels there.

== Interactions ==
TEK tyrosine kinase has been shown to interact with:

- ANGPT2,
- Angiopoietin 1,
- DOK2.

== See also ==
- Tie-2/Ang-1 signaling
