= Intussusceptive angiogenesis =

Type of angiogenesis

Intussusceptive angiogenesis also known as splitting angiogenesis, is a type of angiogenesis, the process whereby a new blood vessel is created. By intussusception a new blood vessel is created by splitting of an existing blood vessel in two. Intussusception occurs in normal development as well as in pathologic conditions involving wound healing, tissue regeneration, inflammation as colitis or myocarditis, lung fibrosis, and tumors amongst others.

Intussusception was first observed in neonatal rats. In this type of vessel formation, the capillary wall extends into the lumen to split a single vessel in two. There are four phases of intussusceptive angiogenesis. First, the two opposing capillary walls establish a zone of contact. Second, the endothelial cell junctions are reorganized and the vessel bilayer is perforated to allow growth factors and cells to penetrate into the lumen. Third, a core is formed between the two new vessels at the zone of contact that is filled with pericytes and myofibroblasts. These cells begin laying collagen fibers into the core to provide an extracellular matrix for growth of the vessel lumen. Finally, the core is fleshed out with no alterations to the basic structure. Intussusception is important because it is a reorganization of existing cells. It allows a vast increase in the number of capillaries without a corresponding increase in the number of endothelial cells. This is especially important in embryonic development as there are not enough resources to create a rich microvasculature with new cells every time a new vessel develops.

A process called coalescent angiogenesis is considered the opposite of intussusceptive angiogenesis. During coalescent angiogenesis capillaries fuse and form larger vessels to increase blood flow and circulation. Several other modes of angiogenesis have been described, such as sprouting angiogenesis, vessel co-option and vessel elongation.

== Research ==
In a small study comparing the lungs of patients who had died from COVID-19 to those that had died from influenza A pneumonia (H1N1) to uninfected controls during autopsy; there was a significantly greater density of intussusceptive angiogenic features in the lungs of patients who had died from Covid-19 as compared to influenza A and the control group. The degree of intussusceptive angiogenic features in the lungs from the Covid-19 patients were also found to be greater as the length of hospitalization increased (which was not seen in the influenza or control groups). This suggests that increased or enhanced intussusceptive angiogenesis is seen in Covid-19 and may play a role in pathogenesis.
