= The Angiogenesis Foundation =

American non-profit organization

- Type: Non-profit
- Founded: 1994 in Cambridge, MA
- Founder: William W. Li, MD and Vincent W. Li, MD (co-founders)
- Headquarters: Cambridge, MA, U.S.
- Revenue: 1,772,286 United States dollar (2017)
- Total assets: 359,298 United States dollar (2022)
- Website: angio.org

The Angiogenesis Foundation, is a United States 501(c)(3) nonprofit organization established to study angiogenesis.

== History ==
The Angiogenesis Foundation was founded in 1994 in Cambridge, Massachusetts. The foundation developed a therapy for canine cancer, called the Navy Protocol. This treatment works by starving the tumor of its blood supply. In 2004, they helped publicly launch the first antiangiogenic therapy for cancer, bevacizumab, starting with colorectal cancer. In 2010, the president and co-founder of the Angiogenesis Foundation, William Li, gave a well-received presentation at the TED conference on cancer prevention through antiangiogenic nutrition.

Co-founder Dr. William Li won the 2024 Dr. Andrew von Eschenbach Award for his work in angiogenesis.
