= Coalescent angiogenesis =

Process of blood vessel formation

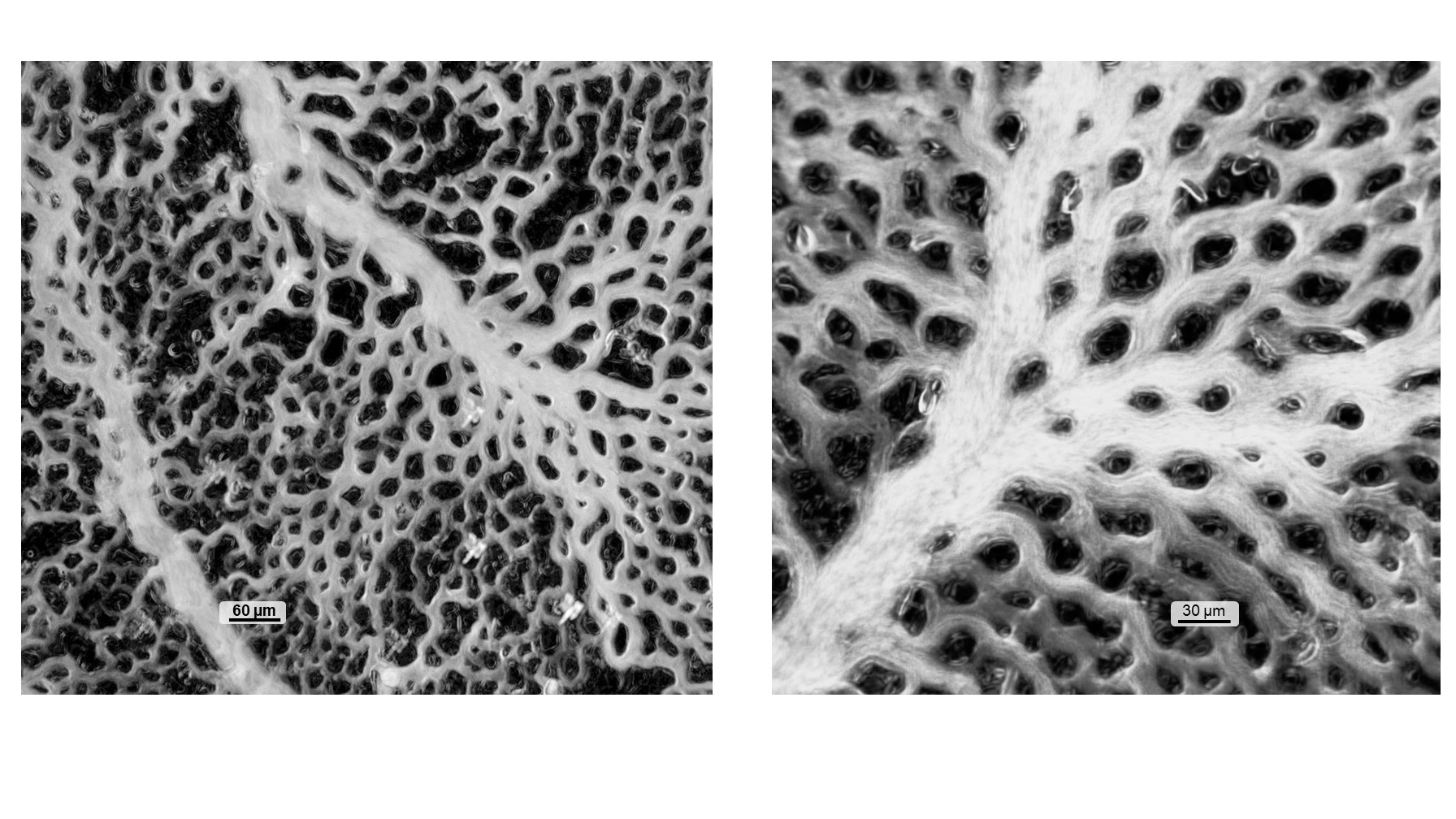
Coalescent angiogenesis. In the capillary mesh, capillaries fuse to form a larger vessel to increase blood flow. This picture was provided by Bianca Nitzsche and Axel Pries, Berlin, Germany

Angiogenesis is the process of the formation of new blood vessels from pre-existing vascular structures, which is needed for oxygenation of - and providing nutrients to - expanding tissue. Angiogenesis takes place through different modes of action. Coalescent angiogenesis is a mode of angiogenesis where vessels coalesce or fuse to increase blood circulation. This process transforms an inefficient net structure into a more efficient treelike structure. It is the opposite of intussusceptive angiogenesis, which is where vessels split to form new vessels.

== Background ==
While the most studied mode of angiogenesis is sprouting angiogenesis, several different modes of angiogenesis have been described. Among these are intussusceptive angiogenesis or splitting angiogenesis, vessel cooption, and vessel elongation. A novel form of angiogenesis is the process called ‘’’coalescent angiogenesis’’’, which is the opposite of intussusceptive angiogenesis. This mode of angiogenesis was reported from studies of long-term time-lapse microscopy in the vasculature of the chick chorioallantoic membrane (CAM), where this novel non-sprouting mode for vessel generation was observed.

Specifically, isotropic capillary meshes enclosing tissue islands evolve into preferred flow pathways consisting of larger blood vessels transporting more blood in a faster pace. These preferential flow pathways progressively enlarge by coalescence of capillaries and elimination of internal tissue pillars, in a fast time frame of hours. This way coalescent angiogenesis is the reverse of intussusceptive angiogenesis. Concomitantly, less perfused segments of the vasculature regress. An initially mesh-like capillary network is remodelled into a tree structure, while conserving vascular wall components and maintaining blood flow. Coalescent angiogenesis, thus, describes the remodelling of an initial hemodynamically inefficient mesh structure, into a hierarchical tree structure that provides efficient convective transport, allowing for the rapid expansion of the vasculature with maintained blood supply and function during development.

Vascular fusion was initially described to happen during the formation of the dorsal aorta. All research presented has been derived from embryo development studies. It is unknown whether coalescent angiogenesis has extended out of the domain of embryology. In any case, it has been overlooked in the field of cancer research and it is currently only assumed to play a role in the formation of tumor vasculature.
