= Arteriogenesis =

Widening of existing arterial blood vessels

Arteriogenesis refers to an increase in the diameter of existing arterial vessels.

== Mechanical stimulation ==
Mechanically, arteriogenesis is linked to elevated pressure, which increases radial wall stress, and elevated flow, which increases endothelial surface stress. The vessel increases in diameter until the stress is normalized (Prior et al., 2004). Arteriogenesis does not occur every time there is an increase in flow, however. Most vessel networks can handle increased flow without significantly increasing diameter because flow increases with the square (power 2) of the vessel diameter. Initial experiments demonstrated this phenomenon in that mature vessels are unlikely to respond to increased flow by increasing diameter, but will respond to decreased flow by decreasing diameter (Brownlee & Langille, 1991). Another experiment showed that increasing shear stress caused an immediate increase in vessel expansion followed by a rapid decrease, as well as demonstrating that the mature vessels do indeed respond more favorably to decreased stress (Tuttle et al., 2001).

== Chemical stimulation ==
=== General ===
Chemically, arteriogenesis is related to upregulation of cytokines and cell adhesion receptors. More specifically, mechanical stresses cause endothelial cells to produce chemical facilitators that begin the process of increasing diameter. An increase in shear stress causes an increase in the number of monocyte chemoattractant protein-1 (MCP-1) molecules expressed on the surface of vessel walls as well as increased levels of TNF-α, bFGF, and MMP. MCP-1 increases the tendency of monocytes to attach to the cell wall. TNF-α provides an inflammatory environment for the cells to develop while bFGF helps induce mitosis in the endothelial cells. Finally, MMPs remodel the space around the artery to provide the space for expansion (Van Royen et al., 2001). Another potent chemical signal is nitric oxide (NO), demonstrated to be a major factor in increasing vessel diameter in response to increased flow until the shear stress is restored to the normal level (Tronc et al., 1996).

=== bFGF ===
bFGF is known to increase both arteriogenesis and angiogenesis in vivo. However, it is not sufficient as a monotherapy to increase arteriogenesis. In a placebo study determining the effects of bFGF on arteriogenesis, patients were treated with one bolus of bFGF. The treatment helped reduce anginal symptoms but did not significantly affect arteriogenesis. Thus, it is speculated that other growth factors work in tandem with bFGF to produce the desired response and that growth factors must be administered at varying time points throughout the duration of the experiment (Van Royen et al., 2001). This finding is important because it shows that arteriogenesis is the result of a combination of signaling cascades and growth factors as opposed to being tied to a single chemical.

=== CCL2 ===
MCP1 (now called CCL2) is especially important in arteriogenesis. Since MCP-1 attracts monocytes it can produce an immune cascade to aid inflammation. Monocytes can enter the vessel wall to become macrophages and produce inflammatory cytokines such as TNF-α in addition to aiding the production of bFGF and MMP (Van Royen et al., 2000). Macrophages also produce vascular endothelial growth factor (VEGF) that is a huge contributor to the growth signaling of endothelial cells. Endothelial cells have a receptor devoted to VEGF aptly named VEGF receptor-1 that immediately signals rapid mitosis in the cells (Prior et al., 2004). One study showed that local infusion of MCP-1 caused a large increase in conductance in both collateral and peripheral vessels while diminished levels of MCP-1 hindered the process of arteriogenesis (Ito et al., 1997). This indicates that monocytes play a significant role in inducing arteriogenesis.

== Applications of arteriogenesis ==
=== Exercise ===
Poiseuille’s Law for flow indicates that the total flow in a tube is related to the diameter of the tube by a power of four. Thus, an increase in the diameter of a high order blood vessel such as an arteriole vastly increases the total flow that a given vessel network can withstand. This flow increase is vitally important in the microvasculature remodeling following exercise, especially in sprint training. Sprint training is a type of anaerobic exercise that relies on having the maximum amount of blood available to the vessel network at any given time (Prior et al., 2004).

=== Atherosclerosis ===
Arteriogenesis also has much in common with the mechanisms of atherosclerosis. Monocytes invade the endothelial tissue, inflammatory cytokines are released, endothelial cells proliferate into the surrounding tissue, and cell adhesion receptors are upregulated. Presently, the effects of arteriogenesis on atherosclerosis are unknown, although MCP-1 receptors are known to be associated with plaque formation (Van Royen et al., 2001).

== See also ==
- Angiogenesis
- Anaerobic exercise

== Sources ==
1. Brownlee, R. D., & Langille, B. L. Arterial adaptions to altered blood flow. Can J Physiol Pharmacol 69: 978-83, 1991.
2. Ito WD, Arrasi M, Winkler B, Scholz D, Schaper J, and Schaper W. Monocytochemotactic protein-1 increases collateral and peripheral conductance after femoral artery occlusion. Circ Res 80: 829–837, 1997.
3. Prior, B. M., Yang, H. T., & Terjung, R. L. What makes vessels grow with exercise training? J App Physiol 97: 1119-28, 2004.
4. Tronc F, Wassef M, Exposito B, Henrion D, Glagov S, and Tedgui A. Role of NO in flow-induced remodeling of the rabbit common carotid artery. Arterioscler Thromb Vasc Biol 16: 1256–1262, 1996.
5. Tuttle, J. L., Nachreiner, R. D., Bhuller, A. S., Condict, K. W., Connors, B. A., & Herring, B. P. et al. Shear level influences resistance artery remodeling: Wall dimensions, cell density, and eNOS expression. Am J Physiol Heart Circ Physiol 281: H1380-H1389, 2001.
6. Van Royen N, Piek JJ, Buschmann I, Hoefer I, Voskuil M, and Schaper W. Stimulation of arteriogenesis: a new concept for the treatment of arterial occlusive disease. Cardiovasc Res 49: 543–553, 2001.
