= Angiopoietin 1 =

Protein-coding gene in the species Homo sapiens

ANGPT1

Identifiers
- Aliases: ANGPT1, AGP1, AGPT, ANG1, angiopoietin 1, HAE5, AGPT-1
- External IDs: OMIM: 601667; MGI: 108448; GeneCards: ANGPT1
Available structures
| PDB | Ortholog search: PDBe RCSB |
| PDB | List of PDB id codes 4EPU, 4JYO, 4K0V |

Gene location (Human)
| Chr. | Chromosome 8 (human) |
| Band | 8q23.1 | Start | 107,249,482 bp |
| Band | 8q23.1 | End | 107,498,055 bp |

Gene location (Mouse)
| Chr. | Chromosome 15 (mouse) |
| Band | 15 B3.1|15 16.69 cM | Start | 42,288,119 bp |
| Band | 15 B3.1|15 16.69 cM | End | 42,540,373 bp |
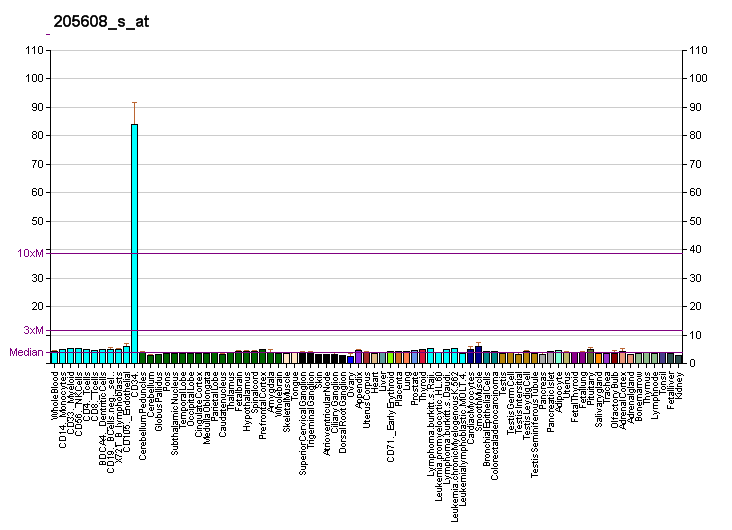

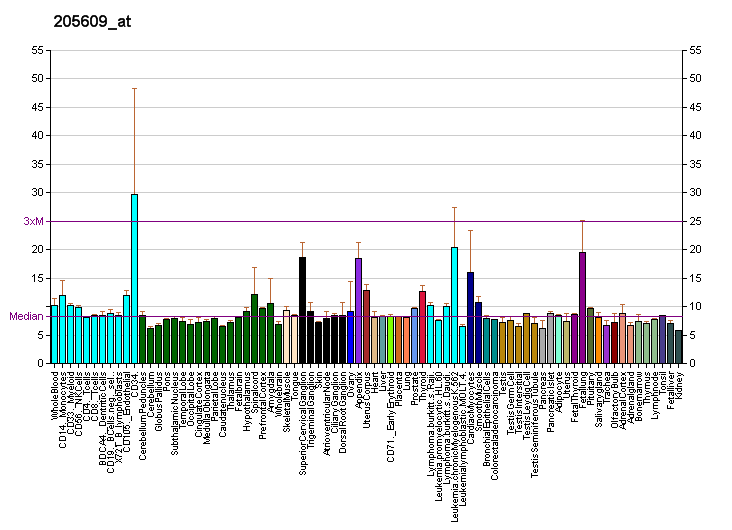
RNA expression pattern
| Bgee | Human / Mouse (ortholog); Top expressed in: lower lobe of lung; Achilles tendon; optic nerve; right lung; popliteal artery; tibial arteries; seminal vesicula; urethra; stromal cell of endometrium; tail of epididymis / Top expressed in: atrium; atrioventricular valve; blood; genital tubercle; intercostal muscle; digastric muscle; lumbar spinal ganglion; molar; right lung; stroma of bone marrow; More reference expression data |
| BioGPS | More reference expression data |
Gene ontology
| Molecular function | receptor tyrosine kinase binding; protein binding; signaling receptor binding |
| Cellular component | plasma membrane; microvillus; membrane raft; extracellular exosome; extracellular region; intracellular anatomical structure; extracellular space |
| Biological process | negative regulation of neuron apoptotic process; negative regulation of protein phosphorylation; negative regulation of endothelial cell apoptotic process; negative regulation of cell adhesion; cell differentiation; hemopoiesis; positive regulation of protein kinase B signaling; heparin biosynthetic process; positive regulation of receptor internalization; regulation of tumor necrosis factor production; transmembrane receptor protein tyrosine kinase signaling pathway; negative regulation of cytokine production involved in immune response; sprouting angiogenesis; in utero embryonic development; negative regulation of apoptotic process; positive regulation of peptidyl-serine phosphorylation; MAPK cascade; positive regulation of endothelial cell migration; multicellular organism development; cell-substrate adhesion; protein localization to cell surface; angiogenesis; positive regulation of blood vessel endothelial cell migration; positive regulation of ERK1 and ERK2 cascade; regulation of macrophage migration inhibitory factor signaling pathway; regulation of endothelial cell proliferation; positive regulation of phosphatidylinositol 3-kinase signaling; positive chemotaxis; activation of transmembrane receptor protein tyrosine kinase activity; regulation of protein binding; regulation of skeletal muscle satellite cell proliferation; positive regulation of protein ubiquitination; leukocyte migration; regulation of I-kappaB kinase/NF-kappaB signaling; negative regulation of protein import into nucleus; positive regulation of cell adhesion; glomerulus vasculature development; negative regulation of vascular permeability; Tie signaling pathway; positive regulation of peptidyl-tyrosine phosphorylation |
Sources:Amigo / QuickGO
Orthologs
| Databases | NCBI: entry; OMA: entry |
| Species | Human | Mouse |
| Entrez | 284 | 11600 |
| Ensembl | ENSG00000154188 | ENSMUSG00000022309 |
| UniProt | Q15389 | O08538 |
| RefSeq (mRNA) | NM_001146; NM_001199859; NM_001314051; NM_139290 | NM_009640; NM_001286062 |
| RefSeq (protein) | NP_001137; NP_001186788; NP_001300980 | NP_001272991; NP_033770 |
| Location (UCSC) | Chr 8: 107.25 – 107.5 Mb | Chr 15: 42.29 – 42.54 Mb |
| PubMed search |
- Wikidata
| View/Edit Human | View/Edit Mouse |

Angiopoietin 1 is a type of angiopoietin and is encoded by the gene ANGPT1.

Angiopoietins are proteins with important roles in vascular development and angiogenesis. All angiopoietins bind with similar affinity to an endothelial cell-specific tyrosine-protein kinase receptor. The protein encoded by this gene is a secreted glycoprotein that activates the receptor by inducing its tyrosine phosphorylation. It plays a critical role in mediating reciprocal interactions between the endothelium and surrounding matrix and mesenchyme. The protein also contributes to blood vessel maturation and stability, and may be involved in early development of the heart. During pregnancy, angiopoietins act complementary to the VEGF system and contribute to endothelial cell survival and the remodeling of vessels. Few studies have examined the role of angiopoietins in human pregnancy complications like preeclampsia and intrauterine growth restriction (IUGR).

A knockout model of ANGPT1 was introduced in mice embryos. Results showed that embryos began to appear abnormal by day 11 and were dead by day 12.5 of pregnancy. The embryos showed prominent defects in endocardial and myocardial development as well as a less complex vascular network.

== Interactions ==
Angiopoietin 1 has been shown to interact with TEK tyrosine kinase.

== Placental Malaria ==
Recently, studies in malaria-endemic areas suggest that placental malaria (PM) may be associated with a dysregulation in angiopoietins. Increased levels of angiopoietin-1 appear to be associated with a decrease in placental weight and placental barrier thickness in women infected with Plasmodium (the causative agent of malaria). In a mouse model of PM, Plasmodium infection of pregnant mice led to decreased angiopoietin-1, increased angiopoietin-2, and an elevated ratio of angiopoietin-2/angiopoietin-1 in the placenta. This suggests that angiopoietin levels could be clinically significant biomarkers to identify mothers infected with PM.

== See also ==
- Angiopoietin
