= TIE1 =

Mammalian protein found in humans

Identifiers
- Aliases: TIE1, JTK14, TIE, tyrosine kinase with immunoglobulin like and EGF like domains 1, LMPHM11
- External IDs: OMIM: 600222; MGI: 99906; GeneCards: TIE1
Enzyme activity
EC #	BRENDA	ExPASy	KEGG	MetaCyc
2.7.10.1	↗	↗	↗	↗

Gene location (Human)
Chr.	Chromosome 1 (human)
Band	1p34.2	Start	43,300,982 bp
Band	1p34.2	End	43,323,108 bp

Gene location (Mouse)
Chr.	Chromosome 4 (mouse)
Band	4 D2.1|4 54.67 cM	Start	118,328,388 bp
Band	4 D2.1|4 54.67 cM	End	118,347,258 bp
RNA expression pattern
Bgee	Human / Mouse (ortholog); Top expressed in: apex of heart; right lung; upper lobe of left lung; right lobe of thyroid gland; subcutaneous adipose tissue; left lobe of thyroid gland; body of uterus; left ventricle; right auricle of heart; tibial nerve / Top expressed in: cardiac muscle tissue of left ventricle; left lung; ankle joint; right lung; interventricular septum; left lung lobe; right lung lobe; yolk sac; atrium; vein; More reference expression data
BioGPS	n/a
Gene ontology
Molecular function	transferase activity; nucleotide binding; protein kinase activity; kinase activity; protein binding; transmembrane receptor protein tyrosine kinase activity; protein tyrosine kinase activity; ATP binding; receptor tyrosine kinase; transmembrane signaling receptor activity
Cellular component	integral component of membrane; membrane; plasma membrane; integral component of plasma membrane; cytoplasm; receptor complex
Biological process	plasma membrane fusion; response to retinoic acid; phosphorylation; in utero embryonic development; vasculogenesis; protein phosphorylation; negative regulation of cell migration; blood vessel development; angiogenesis; negative regulation of angiogenesis; mesoderm development; signal transduction; peptidyl-tyrosine phosphorylation; negative regulation of signal transduction; cell differentiation; negative regulation of apoptotic process; positive regulation of ERK1 and ERK2 cascade; transmembrane receptor protein tyrosine kinase signaling pathway; positive regulation of angiogenesis
Sources:Amigo / QuickGO
Orthologs
Databases	NCBI: entry; OMA: entry
Species	Human	Mouse
Entrez	7075	21846
Ensembl	ENSG00000066056	ENSMUSG00000033191
UniProt	P35590	Q06806
RefSeq (mRNA)	NM_001253357; NM_005424	NM_011587
RefSeq (protein)	NP_001240286; NP_005415	NP_035717
Location (UCSC)	Chr 1: 43.3 – 43.32 Mb	Chr 4: 118.33 – 118.35 Mb
PubMed search
- Wikidata
View/Edit Human	View/Edit Mouse

tyrosine kinase with immunoglobulin-like and EGF-like domains 1

Identifiers
- Symbol: TIE1
- Alt. symbols: TIE, JTK14
- NCBI gene: 7075
- HGNC: 11809
- OMIM: 600222
- RefSeq: NM_005424
- UniProt: P35590

Other data
- EC number: 2.7.1.112
- Locus: Chr. 1 p34-p33
Search for
- Structures: Swiss-model
- Domains: InterPro

Tyrosine kinase with immunoglobulin-like and EGF-like domains 1 also known as TIE1 is an angiopoietin receptor which in humans is encoded by the TIE1 gene.

== Function ==
TIE1 is a cell surface protein expressed exclusively in endothelial cells, however it has also been shown to be expressed in immature hematopoietic cells and platelets. TIE1 upregulates the cell adhesion molecules (CAMs) VCAM-1, E-selectin, and ICAM-1 through a p38-dependent mechanism. Attachment of monocyte derived immune cells to endothelial cells is also enhanced by TIE1 expression. TIE1 has a proinflammatory effect and may play a role in the endothelial inflammatory diseases such as atherosclerosis.

== See also ==
- Angiopoietin § Tie pathway
