= Angiopoietin =

Protein family

angiopoietin 1

Identifiers
- Symbol: ANGPT1
- NCBI gene: 284
- HGNC: 484
- OMIM: 601667
- RefSeq: NM_001146
- UniProt: Q15389

Other data
- Locus: Chr. 8 q22.3-8q23
Search for
- Structures: Swiss-model
- Domains: InterPro

angiopoietin 2
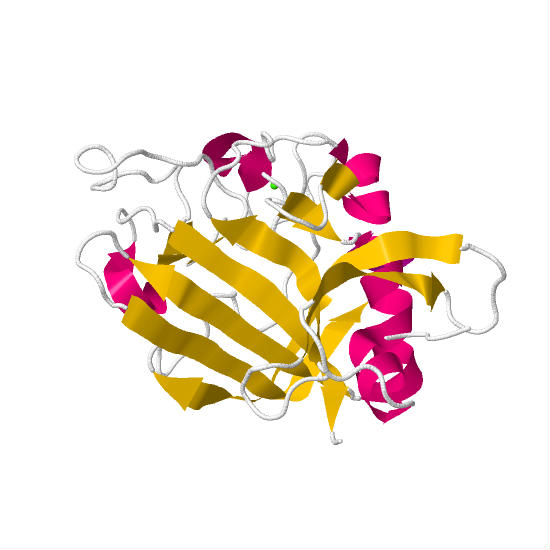
- Crystal structure of the human angiopoietin-2 receptor binding domain.

Identifiers
- Symbol: ANGPT2
- NCBI gene: 285
- HGNC: 485
- OMIM: 601922
- RefSeq: NM_001147
- UniProt: O15123

Other data
- Locus: Chr. 8 p23
Search for
- Structures: Swiss-model
- Domains: InterPro

Angiopoietin is part of a family of vascular growth factors that play a role in embryonic and postnatal angiogenesis. Angiopoietin signaling most directly corresponds with angiogenesis, the process by which new arteries and veins form from preexisting blood vessels. Angiogenesis proceeds through sprouting, endothelial cell migration, proliferation, and vessel destabilization and stabilization. They are responsible for assembling and disassembling the endothelial lining of blood vessels. Angiopoietin cytokines are involved in controlling microvascular permeability, vasodilation, and vasoconstriction by signaling smooth muscle cells surrounding vessels. There are now four identified angiopoietins: ANGPT1, ANGPT2, ANGPTL3, ANGPT4.

In addition, there are a number of proteins that are closely related to ('like') angiopoietins (Angiopoietin-related protein 1, ANGPTL2, ANGPTL3, ANGPTL4, ANGPTL5, ANGPTL6, ANGPTL7, ANGPTL8).

Angiopoietin-1 is critical for vessel maturation, adhesion, migration, and survival. Angiopoietin-2, on the other hand, promotes cell death and disrupts vascularization. Yet, when it is in conjunction with vascular endothelial growth factors, or VEGF, it can promote neo-vascularization.

== Structure ==
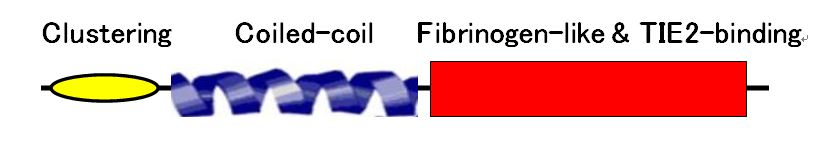
Angiopoietin protein structure. It consists of the N-terminus super cluster domain, the linker region, the central coiled domain, and the binding site at the C terminus.

Structurally, angiopoietins have an N-terminal super clustering domain, a central coiled domain, a linker region, and a C-terminal fibrinogen-related domain responsible for the binding between the ligand and receptor.

Angiopoietin-1 encodes a 498 amino acid polypeptide with a molecular weight of 57 kDa whereas angiopoietin-2 encodes a 496 amino acid polypeptide.

=== Only clusters/multimers activate receptors ===
Angiopoietin-1 and angiopoietin-2 can form dimers, trimers, and tetramers. Angiopoietin-1 has the ability to form higher order multimers through its super clustering domain. However, not all of the structures can interact with the tyrosine kinase receptor. The receptor can only be activated at the tetramer level or higher.

== Specific mechanisms ==
=== Tie pathway ===
The collective interactions between angiopoietins, receptor tyrosine kinases, vascular endothelial growth factors and their receptors form the two signaling pathways— Tie-1 and Tie-2. The two receptor pathways are named as a result of their role in mediating cell signals by inducing the phosphorylation of specific tyrosines. This in turn initiates the binding and activation of downstream intracellular enzymes, a process known as cell signaling.

==== Tie-2 ====
Tie-2/Ang-1 signaling activates β1-integrin and N-cadherin in LSK-Tie2+ cells and promotes hematopoietic stem cell (HSC) interactions with extracellular matrix and its cellular components. Ang-1 promotes quiescence of HSC in vivo. This quiescence or slow cell cycling of HSCs induced by Tie-2/Ang-1 signaling contributes to the maintenance of long-term repopulating ability of HSC and the protection of the HSC compartment from various cellular stresses. Tie-2/Ang-1 signaling plays a critical role in the HSC that is required for the long-term maintenance and survival of HSC in bone marrow. In the endosteum, Tie-2/Ang-1 signaling is predominantly expressed by osteoblastic cells. Although which specific TIE receptors mediate signals downstream of angiogenesis stimulation is highly contested, it is clear that TIE-2 is capable of activation as a result of binding angiopoietins.

Angiopoietin proteins 1 through 4 are all ligands for Tie-2 receptors. Tie-1 heterodimerizes with Tie-2 to enhance and modulate signal transduction of Tie-2 for vascular development and maturation. These Tyrosine kinase receptors are typically expressed on vascular endothelial cells and specific macrophages for immune responses. Angiopoietin-1 is a growth factor produced by vascular support cells, specialized pericytes in the kidney, and hepatic stellate cells (ITO) cells in the liver. This growth factor is also a glycoprotein and functions as an agonist for the tyrosine receptor found in endothelial cells. Angiopoietin-1 and tyrosine kinase signaling are essential for regulating blood vessel development and the stability of mature vessels.

The expression of Angiopoietin-2 in the absence of vascular endothelial growth factor (VEGF) leads to endothelial cell death and vascular regression. Increased levels of Ang2 promote tumor angiogenesis, metastasis, and inflammation. Effective means to control Ang2 in inflammation and cancer should have clinical value. Angiopoietin, more specifically Ang-1 and Ang-2, work hand in hand with VEGF to mediate angiogenesis. Ang-2 works as an antagonist of Ang-1 and promotes vessel regression if VEGF is not present. Ang-2 works with VEGF to facilitate cell proliferation and migration of endothelial cells. Changes in expression of Ang-1, Ang-2 and VEGF have been reported in the rat brain after cerebral ischemia.

=== Angiogenesis signaling ===
To migrate, the endothelial cells need to loosen the endothelial connections by breaking down the basal lamina and the ECM scaffold of blood vessels. These connections are a key determinant of vascular permeability and relieve peri-endothelial cell contact, which is also a major factor in vessel stability and maturity. After the physical barrier is removed, under the influence of the growth factors VEGF with addition contributions of other factors like angiopoietin-1, integrins, and chemokines play an essential role. VEGF and ang-1 are involved in endothelial tube formation.

=== Vascular permeability signaling ===
Angiopoietin-1 and angiopoietin-2 are modulators of endothelial permeability and barrier function. Endothelial cells secrete angiopoietin-2 for autocrine signaling while parenchymal cells of the extravascular tissue secrete angiopoietin-2 onto endothelial cells for paracrine signaling, which then binds to the extracellular matrix and is stored within the endothelial cells.

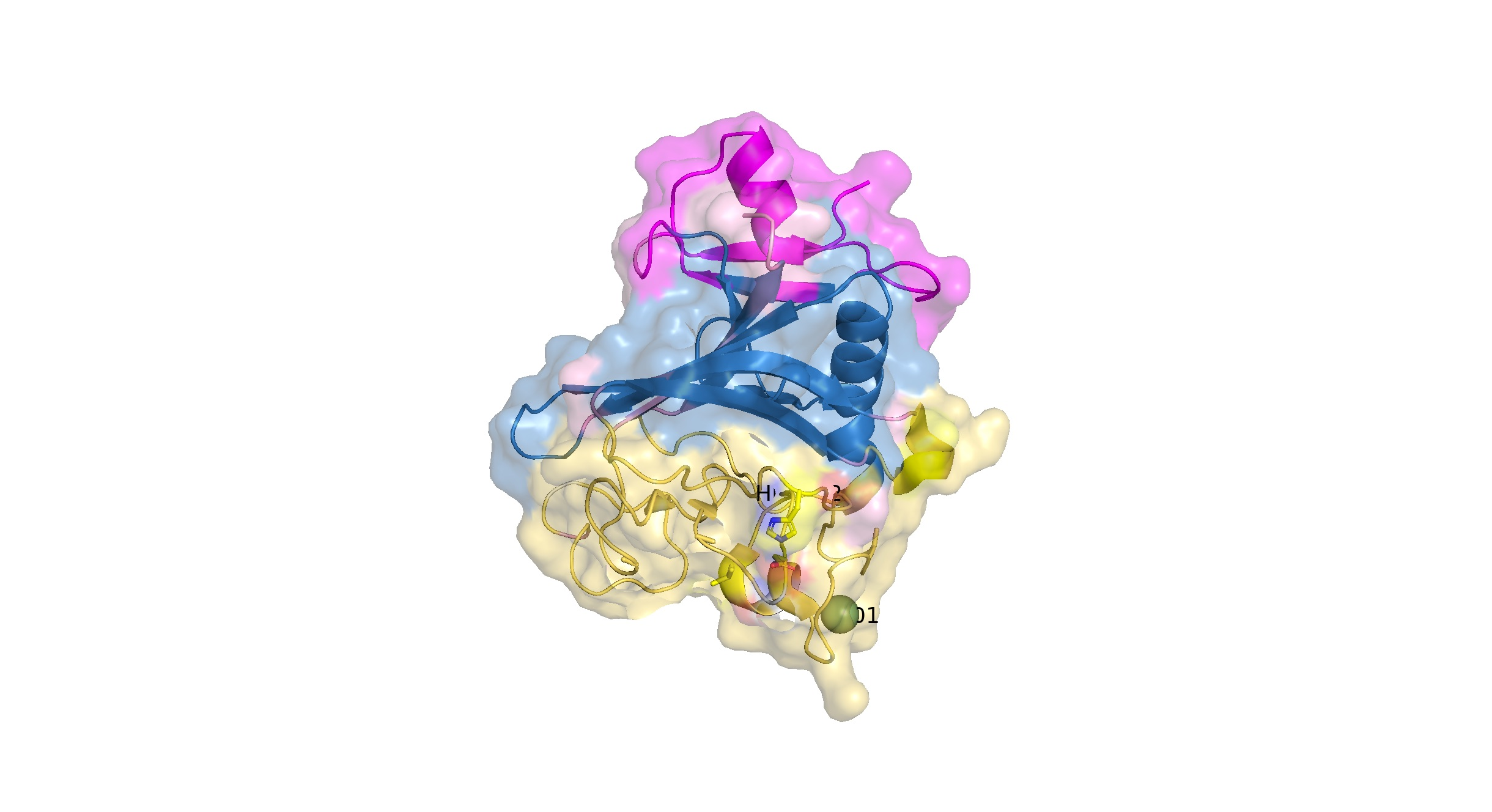

=== Angiopoietin-1 and the Tie2 ===
Angiopoietin-1 has been classified as a Tie2 agonist. Due to Angiopoietin-2 being an antagonist researchers looked into functional differences between Ang-1 and Ang-2 to learn more about the Tie2 signaling initiation. Early structural analysis revealed that their differences were concentrated in the P-domain of the fibrinogen. Studies showed that the P-domain consisted of non-polar residues. Providing stability for the Calcium Ion and the Tie2 complex. Studies showed that three residues in the P-domain where responsible for the agonist behavior of Ang-1: Leu, His, Asp. This was significant because this knowledge could be applied to Ang-2 studies. Through the substitution of these residues the signaling of Ang-2 could be inhibited. Making it valuable for cancer drug discovery.

=== Cancer ===
Angiopoietin-2 has been proposed as a biomarker in different cancer types. Angiopoietin-2 expression levels are proportional to the cancer stage for both small and non-small cell lung cancers. It has been also implicated to play role in hepatocellular and endometrial carcinoma-induced angiogenesis. Experiments using blocking antibodies for angiopoietin-2 have shown to decrease metastasis to lungs and lymph nodes.

== Clinical relevance ==
Deregulation of angiopoietin and the tyrosine kinase pathway is common in blood-related diseases such as diabetes, malaria, sepsis, and pulmonary hypertension. This is demonstrated by an increased ratio of angiopoietin-2 and angiopoietin-1 in blood serum. To be specific, angiopoietin levels provide an indication for sepsis. Research on angiopoietin-2 has shown that it is involved in the onset of septic shock. The combination of fever and high levels of angiopoietin-2 are correlated with a greater prospect of the development of septic shock. It has also been shown that imbalances between angiopoietin-1 and angiopoietin-2 signaling can act independently of each other. One angiopoietin factor can signal at high levels while the other angiopoieting factor remains at baseline level signaling.

Angiopoietin-2 is produced and stored in Weibel-Palade bodies in endothelial cells and acts as a TEK tyrosine kinase antagonist. As a result, the promotion of endothelial activation, destabilization, and inflammation are promoted. Its role during angiogenesis depends on the presence of Vegf-a.

Serum levels of angiopoietin-2 expression are associated with the growth of multiple myeloma, angiogenesis, and overall survival in oral squamous cell carcinoma. Circulating angiopoietin-2 is a marker for early cardiovascular disease in children on chronic dialysis. Kaposi's sarcoma-associated herpesvirus induces rapid release of angiopoietin-2 from endothelial cells.

Angiopoietin-2 is elevated in patients with angiosarcoma.

Research has shown angiopoietin signaling to be relevant in treating cancer as well. During tumor growth, pro-angiogenic molecules and anti-angiogenic molecules are off balance. Equilibrium is disrupted such that the number of pro-angiogenic molecules are increased. Angiopoietins have been known to be recruited as well as VEGFs and platelet-derived growth factors (PDGFs). This is relevant for clinical use relative to cancer treatments because the inhibition of angiogenesis can aid in suppressing tumor proliferation.
