= Robert Degos =

French dermatologist

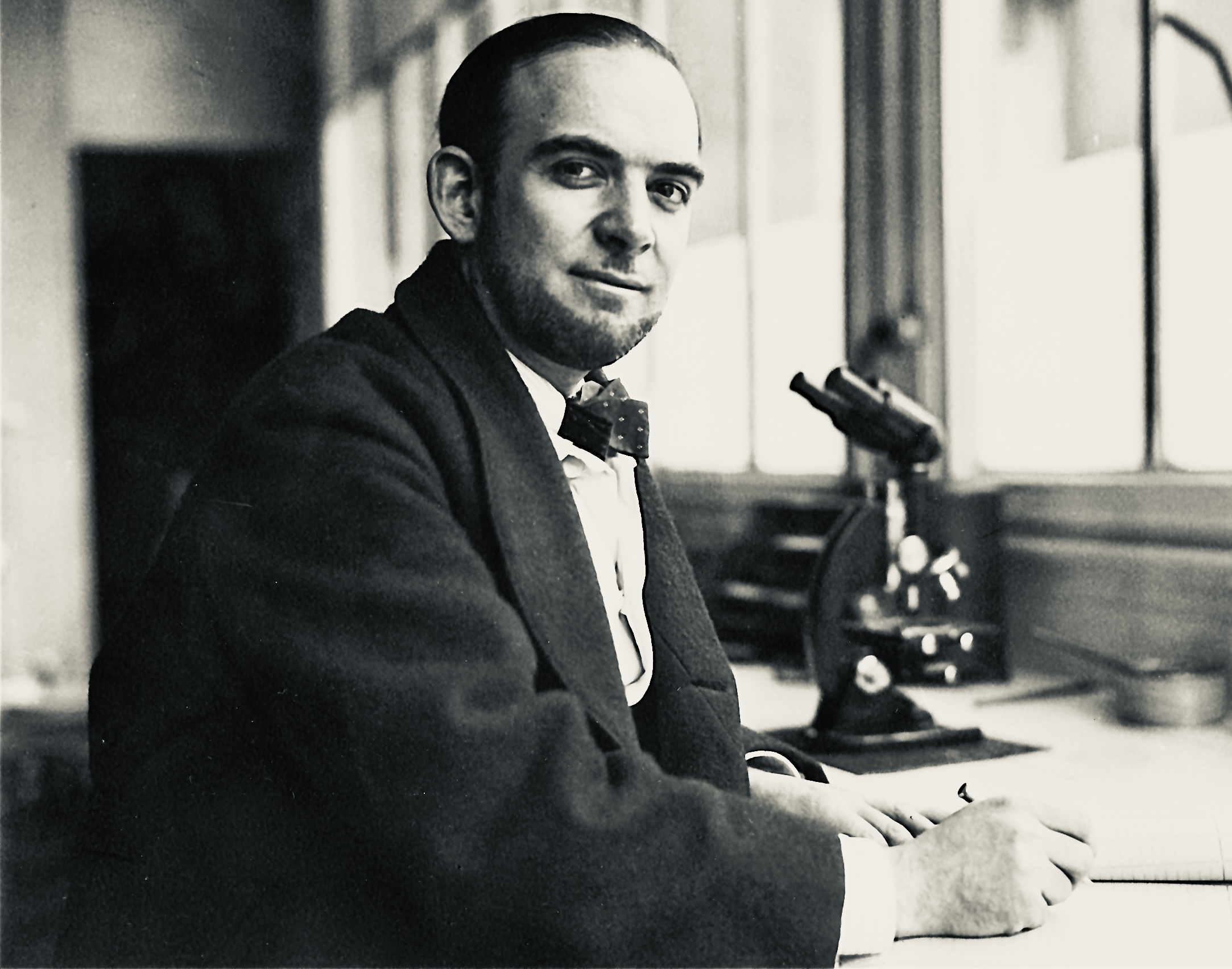
- Portrait of Robert Degos
- Born: 8 November 1904; Mugron, France
- Died: 3 May 1987 (aged 82); Paris, France
- Medical career
- Profession: physician
- Field: dermatology
- Institutions: University of Paris, Hopital Saint-Louis
- Research: clinical dermatology, medical history, syphilis

Robert Degos (1904–1987) was a French dermatologist who described several dermatoses including Degos disease which he first described in a seminal paper published in 1942 in the French journal of dermatology and syphilology.

== Life and work ==
He became an "interne des Hopitaux de Paris" in 1926 and trained at the Hopital Broca before joining the Hopital Saint-Louis in 1931 in the Department of another renown dermatologist, Gaston Auguste Milian. But it is Henri Gougerot in whose department he worked and trained in 1933 as "chef de clinique" - and who ultimately became his mentor - who influenced his choice of specializing in dermatology.

Degos became the "Chair in skin and syphilitic diseases" and chief of the first department of Dermatology at the Hopital Saint-Louis in 1951.

He was widely published including a classic textbook, Dermatologie, that was "the bible of all French Dermatologists for several decades and reflects the type of Dermatology Prof. Degos practiced, conceptualized and taught". Since its first publication in 1953, Dermatologie has undergone several editions and updates.

== Key publications ==
- Degos R, Delort J, and Tricot R. 1942. "Dermatite papulosquameuse atrophiante" Bulletin de la Société Française de Dermatologie et de Syphiligraphie 49: 148–150.
- Degos, R. 1952. La Dermatologie. 4. éd. Les Petits Précis. Paris: Maloine.
- Degos, R. 1953. Dermatologie. Collection Médico-chirurgicale à Révision Annuelle. Paris: Flammarion.
