= Domenico Majocchi =

Domenico Majocchi (1849–1929) was an Italian dermatologist, histologist and anatomo-pathologist. Majocchi discovered pathologies such as purpura annularis telangiectodes (commonly known as Majocchi's disease) and Fungal folliculitis (also known as "Majocchi granuloma").

== Biography ==
Majocchi was born on 5 August 1849 in Roccalvecce, near Viterbo, son of Pietro, a local doctor, and Virginia Tomasetti. He graduated in the faculty of medicine of the Sapienza University of Rome on 11 August 1873.

== Career ==
In 1874 he won the competition to become a substitute surgeon of the hospitals of Rome. He began to take an interest in dermatology, leading him to the anatomopathological studies of Ferdinand von Hebra, the founder of the modern dermatological clinic. He took a post at S. Gallicano hospital where he started his career and quickly mastered this specialty. In 1879, he became professor of dermosyphilopathy at the University of Padua. He also worked as a professor of dermosyphilopathy at the universities of Parma (1880–92) and Bologna (1892–1924).

Domenico Majocchi became the first director at Dermatological Clinic of the University of Parma, in 1880, where he offered a pre-emption to the dermosyphilopathy course, entitled "The modern direction of dermatology mercé to the progress of pathological anatomy" which presented the manifesto of his subsequent research. Majocchi was a passionate and respected researcher in the history of medicine. He advocated the foundation of the Italian Society for the Critical History of Medicine and Natural Sciences, in 1907 together with D. Barduzzi, He organised the National Congress in Bologna (1922) and taught in various medical schools. On 29 November 1924, Minister A. Conti established a "school for the special purpose of the history of medicine" lasting four years and open to graduates in medicine and literature. Its direction was entrusted to Majocchi. After retiring in 1924 after reaching the age limit, Majocchi died in Bologna on 7 March 1929.

== Research ==
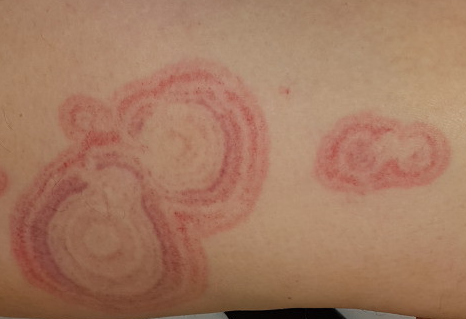
Purpura annularis patch

First described in 1896 by Majocchi, purpura annularis telangiectodes is a pigmented, purplish rash that occurs most commonly in adolescents and young adults.

Majocchi granuloma is a deep folliculitis due to a cutaneous dermatophyte infection. It was discovered by Majocchi in 1883.

== Writings ==
Below is a list of some of his most famous works:

- Domenico Majocchi (1881). La scuole in Milano dalla decadenza dell’impero romano alla fine del secolo 15°: cenni storici. Firenze: Coi Tipi Dell’arte Della Stampa.
- Domenico Majocchi (1896). Intorno al demodex folliculorum nelle ghiandole meibomiane e nei follicoli cigliari dell’ uomo e di alcuni mammiferi e alle lesioni morbose che esso vi genera. Italy.
- Domenico Majocchi (1899). Demodex folliculorum in qualche rara affezione cutanea e speciale reperto del medesimo nei follicoli delle ciglia e delle vibrisse. Italy.
- Domenico Majocchi (1905a). Purpura annularis teleangiectodes. Italy.
- Domenico Majocchi (1905b). Purpura annularis teleangiectodes : memoria. Bologna: Tip. Gamberini E Parmeggiani.
- Domenico Majocchi (1909). Teratoide condro-cisto-papillare della regione periombelicale : nota di teratologia cutanea. Bologna: Tip. Gamberini E Parmeggiani.
- Domenico Majocchi and Bosellini, P.L. (1899). Sull’etiologia del boubas. Italy.
- Domenico Majocchi and Masotti, A. (1931). Esami istologici, praticati dal 1926 al 1929 ... Bologna, Cappelli.
- Domenico Majocchi and Tosi (1856). Del dovere di vietare l’esportazione delle antichità : raccoglierle, conservarle e studiarle poichè esse rivelano la sapienza de’ nostri sommi personaggi e costituiscono la gloria della nazione.

== Bibliography ==
- Domenico Majocchi entry (in Italian) by Agostino Palmerini in the Enciclopedia Treccani
- Arieti S. -Dizionario Biografico Degli Italiani- volume 67 2006
- Hale E. Purpura annularis telangiectodes of Majocchi. Dermatology Online Journal, 9(4). 2003
- Schwartz R. Majocchi Granuloma. Medscape. 2021
