= Doucas and Kapetanakis pigmented purpura =

- Other names: Eczematoid purpura, eczematoid-like purpura.
- Specialty: Dermatology

Doucas and Kapetanakis pigmented purpura, also known as eczematoid purpura, or eczematoid-like purpura, is a skin condition characterized by scaly and eczematous patches, which also have petechiae and hemosiderin staining.

It is a lymphocytic capillaritis of unknown cause. Lesions consist of erythematous and purpuric macules which usually begin around the ankles, coalesce, and spread to involve the whole legs, and sometimes the trunk and upper extremities. The lesions are extremely pruritic (itchy) and occasionally lichenified after prolonged scratching.

It was characterized in 1953.

== See also ==
- Pigmentary purpuric eruptions
- List of cutaneous conditions
