= Charles Lucien de Beurmann =

French dermatologist and mycologist

Charles Lucien de Beurmann (6 December 1851 – 1923) was a French dermatologist and mycologist.

He studied medicine in Paris, where in 1884 he became médecin des hôpitaux (hospital physician). In 1889 he was appointed chef de service (department head) at the Hôpital Lourcine, afterward working at the Hôpital Saint-Louis, where he remained until 1916. He studied exotic diseases in his travels throughout Asia.

Beurmann is known for his contributions in the study of sporotrichosis, a disease that was fairly common in Europe at the time. The fungus that causes sporotrichosis was earlier identified by American physician Benjamin Robinson Schenck (1873–1920) and was named Sporothrix schenckii in Schenck's honor. Beurmann did extensive research involving the cutaneous aspects of the disease, and with Henri Gougerot (1881–1955), he published the monograph, Les Sporotrichoses, a treatise that was based on 250 cases of sporotrichoses in France. In 1903 dermatologist Raymond Sabouraud (1864–1938) suggested to Beurmann, the use of potassium iodide as a remedy. Because of Beurmann's thorough research of sporotrichosis, Sporothrix schenckii was sometimes referred to as Sporotrichum beurmanni.

== Written works ==
- Recherches sur la Mortalité des Femmes en Couches dans les Hôpitaux. Statistiques de Lariboisière 1854-1878 et de Cochin 1873-77. (1879).
- Les sporotrichoses. with Henri Gougerot. Paris, (1912).
