= Gaston Milian =

French dermatologist and syphilogist

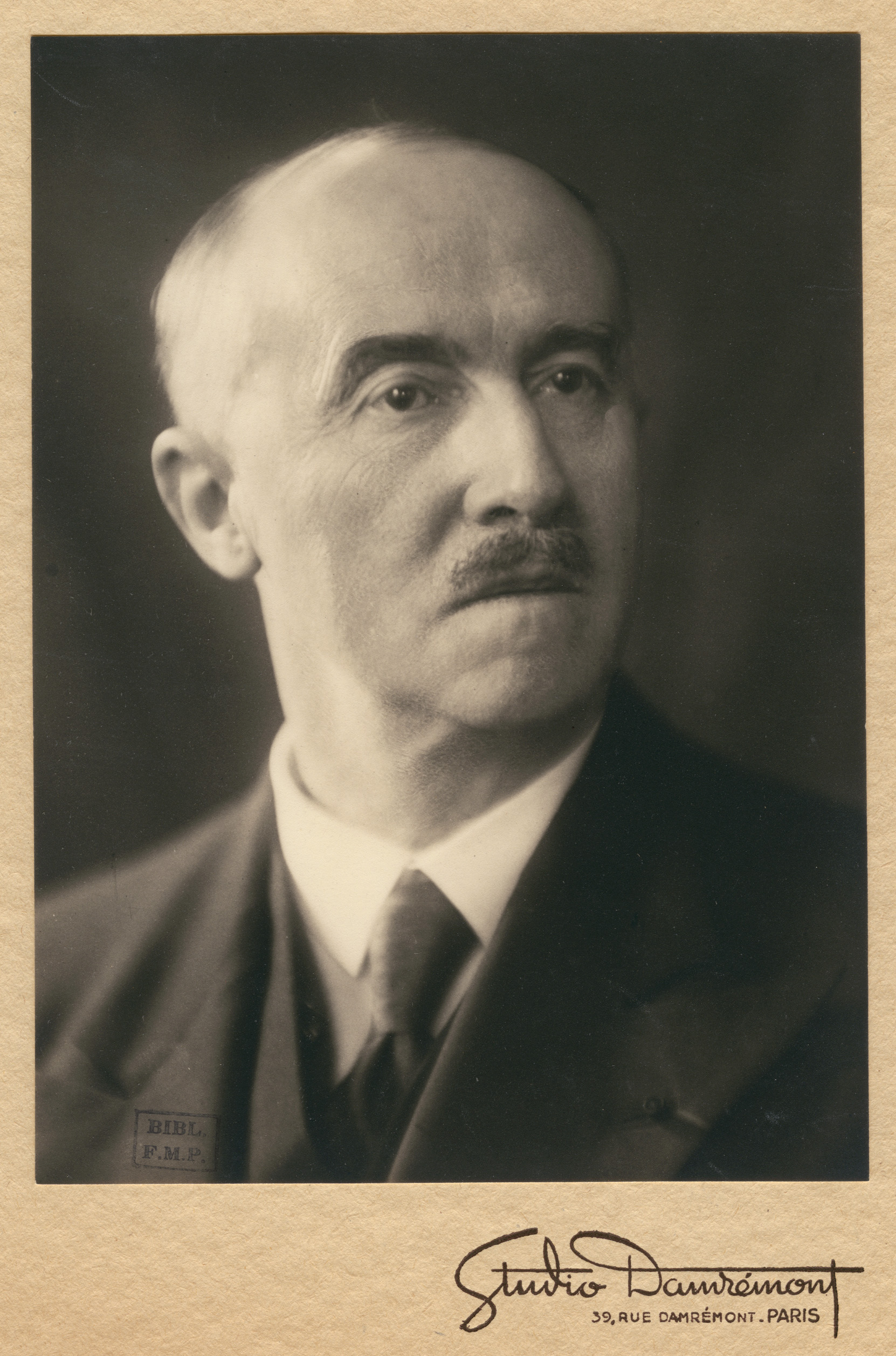
Gaston Milian

Gaston Auguste Milian (2 October 1871, Vitry-le-François – 27 July 1945, Paris) was a French dermatologist and syphilogist.

In 1894 he became an extern to hospitals in Paris, working most notably as an assistant to Ernest Besnier. In 1906 he was named médecin des hôpitaux and subsequently served as departmental head (chef de service) at the Hôpital Saint-Louis in Paris. In 1929/30 he was president of the Société française de dermatologie. In 1938 he became a member of the Académie Nationale de Médecine.

In 1925 he founded the journal "Revue française de dermatologie et de vénéréologie".

== Medical terms ==
- "Milian's erythema" (historical term): also known as "ninth-day erythema"; a nontoxic eruption that resembles measles or a toxic erythema. It usually occurs on the ninth day of a course of medication. It was originally described as a reaction to arsenical treatment of syphilis.
- "Milian's solution": solution of gentian violet and methyl green in alcohol.
- "Milian's ear sign": a medical sign used to distinguish between cellulitis and erysipelas affecting the ear. Because the pinna of the ear lacks a dermis and subcutaneous fat, the diagnosis of cellulitis is less likely since it involves such deep-seated structures.

== Selected works ==
Along with Ferdinand-Jean Darier, Henri Gougerot and Raymond Sabouraud, he made contributions to the 8-volume "Nouvelle pratique dermatologique". Other noteworthy written efforts by Milian include:

- La Réactivation biologique de la réaction de Wassermann, 1911 – Biological reactivation in regards to the Wassermann reaction.
- Traitement de la syphilis par le 606 : (précautions et doses), 1912 – Treatment of syphilis by arsphenamine: (doses and precautions).
- Traitement de la syphilis par le 606 : action, posologie, technique, 1914 – Treatment of syphilis by arsphenamine: action, dosage, technique.
- Le Chancre mou, symptomatologie, complications, diagnostic, traitement, 1931 – The chancroid, symptoms, complications, diagnosis, treatment.
- La syphilis occulte, 1944.
- Les contagions de la syphilis: contacts- hérédité- réinfectio- guérison, 1945 – The contagion of syphilis: contacts, heredity, reinfection, healing.
