= PLA2G4A =

Protein-coding gene in humans

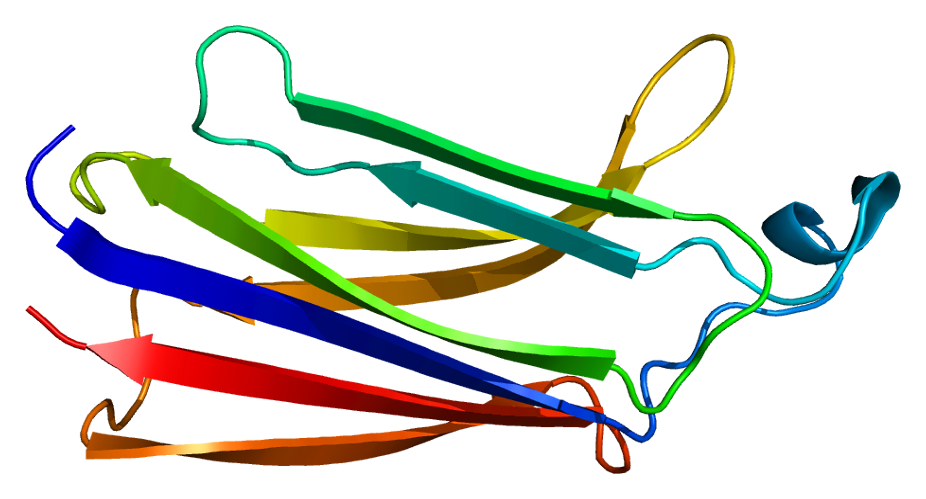

Identifiers
- Aliases: PLA2G4A, PLA2G4, cPLA2-alpha, cPLA2, phospholipase A2 group IVA, GURDP
- External IDs: OMIM: 600522; MGI: 1195256; GeneCards: PLA2G4A
Available structures
PDB	Ortholog search: PDBe RCSB
PDB	List of PDB id codes 1BCI, 1CJY, 1RLW
Enzyme activity
EC #	BRENDA	ExPASy	KEGG	MetaCyc
3.1.1.4	↗	↗	↗	↗
3.1.1.5	↗	↗	↗	↗

Gene location (Human)
Chr.	Chromosome 1 (human)
Band	1q31.1	Start	186,828,949 bp
Band	1q31.1	End	186,988,981 bp

Gene location (Mouse)
Chr.	Chromosome 1 (mouse)
Band	1 G1|1 63.51 cM	Start	149,705,369 bp
Band	1 G1|1 63.51 cM	End	149,837,041 bp
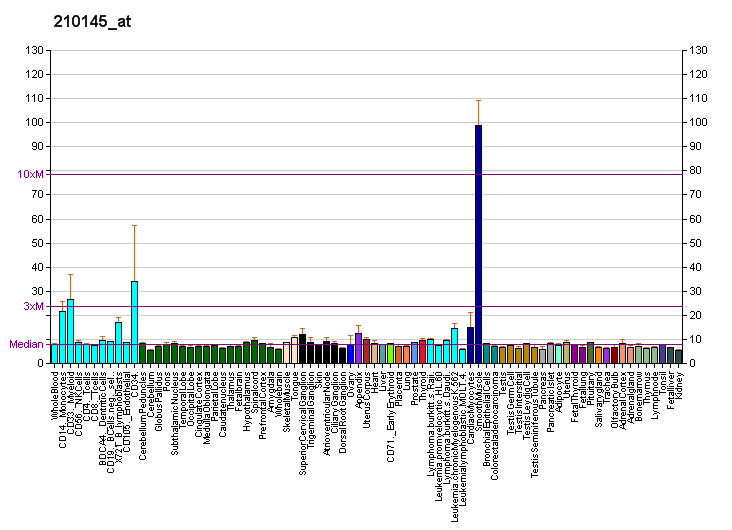
RNA expression pattern
Bgee	Human / Mouse (ortholog); Top expressed in: seminal vesicula; cartilage tissue; right uterine tube; urinary bladder; caput epididymis; mucosa of urinary bladder; germinal epithelium; Achilles tendon; parietal pleura; jejunal mucosa / Top expressed in: epithelium of lens; mucous cell of stomach; urothelium; cervix; epithelium of stomach; transitional epithelium of urinary bladder; Paneth cell; cumulus cell; gastrula; iris; More reference expression data
BioGPS	More reference expression data
Gene ontology
Molecular function	metal ion binding; calcium ion binding; hydrolase activity; calcium-dependent phospholipid binding; phospholipase activity; phospholipase A2 activity; phospholipase A1 activity; lysophospholipase activity; calcium-dependent phospholipase A2 activity
Cellular component	Golgi apparatus; endoplasmic reticulum; endoplasmic reticulum membrane; cytoplasmic vesicle; mitochondrial inner membrane; cytoplasm; lipid droplet; cytosol; nucleus
Biological process	phospholipid metabolic process; phosphatidylinositol acyl-chain remodeling; platelet activating factor biosynthetic process; arachidonic acid secretion; icosanoid metabolic process; lipid metabolism; phosphatidylserine acyl-chain remodeling; phospholipid catabolic process; phosphatidylglycerol acyl-chain remodeling; cellular response to antibiotic; lipid catabolic process; phosphatidic acid biosynthetic process; phosphatidylcholine acyl-chain remodeling; metabolism; regulation of cell population proliferation; phosphatidylethanolamine acyl-chain remodeling; cardiolipin acyl-chain remodeling; icosanoid biosynthetic process; arachidonic acid metabolic process; glycerophospholipid catabolic process
Sources:Amigo / QuickGO
Orthologs
Databases	NCBI: entry; OMA: entry
Species	Human	Mouse
Entrez	5321	18783
Ensembl	ENSG00000116711	ENSMUSG00000056220
UniProt	P47712	P47713
RefSeq (mRNA)	NM_001311193; NM_024420	NM_008869; NM_001305632
RefSeq (protein)	NP_001298122; NP_077734	NP_001292561; NP_032895
Location (UCSC)	Chr 1: 186.83 – 186.99 Mb	Chr 1: 149.71 – 149.84 Mb
PubMed search
- Wikidata
View/Edit Human	View/Edit Mouse

Cytosolic phospholipase A_{2} is an enzyme that in humans is encoded by the PLA2G4A gene.

== Function ==
This gene encodes a member of the cytosolic phospholipase A_{2} group IV family. The enzyme catalyzes the hydrolysis of membrane phospholipids to release arachidonic acid which is subsequently metabolized into eicosanoids. Eicosanoids, including prostaglandins and leukotrienes, are lipid-based cellular hormones that regulate hemodynamics, inflammatory responses, and other intracellular pathways. The hydrolysis reaction also produces lysophospholipids that are converted into platelet-activating factor. The enzyme is activated by increased intracellular Ca^{2+} levels and phosphorylation, resulting in its translocation from the cytosol and nucleus to perinuclear membrane vesicles.

== Interactions ==
PLA2G4A has been shown to interact with histone acetyltransferase KAT5.

== Clinical significance ==
Mutations in this gene have been associated with multifocal stenosing ulceration of the small intestine.
