= KAT5 =

Protein-coding gene in the species Homo sapiens

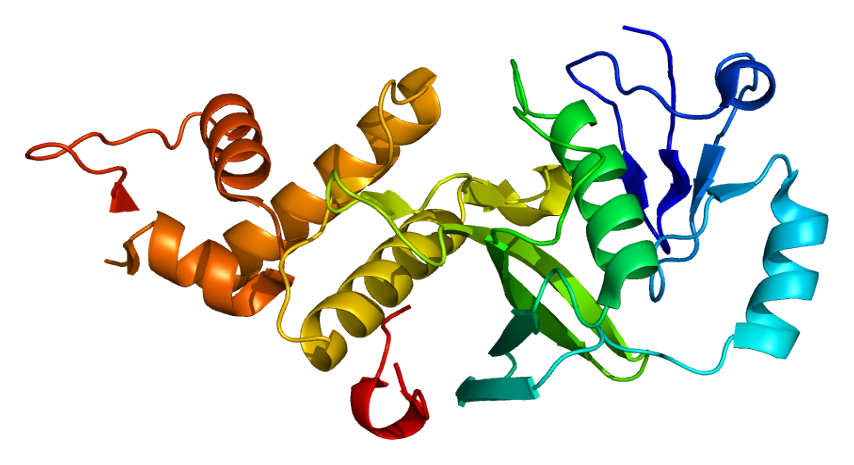

Identifiers
- Aliases: KAT5, ESA1, HTATIP, HTATIP1, PLIP, TIP, TIP60, ZC2HC5, cPLA2, lysine acetyltransferase 5, NEDFASB
- External IDs: OMIM: 601409; MGI: 1932051; GeneCards: KAT5
Available structures
| PDB | Ortholog search: PDBe RCSB |
| PDB | List of PDB id codes 2EKO, 2OU2, 4QQG |
Enzyme activity
| EC # | BRENDA | ExPASy | KEGG | MetaCyc |
|---|---|---|---|---|
| 2.3.1.48 | ↗ | ↗ | ↗ | ↗ |

Gene location (Human)
| Chr. | Chromosome 11 (human) |
| Band | 11q13.1 | Start | 65,711,996 bp |
| Band | 11q13.1 | End | 65,719,604 bp |

Gene location (Mouse)
| Chr. | Chromosome 19 (mouse) |
| Band | 19|19 A | Start | 5,653,042 bp |
| Band | 19|19 A | End | 5,660,265 bp |
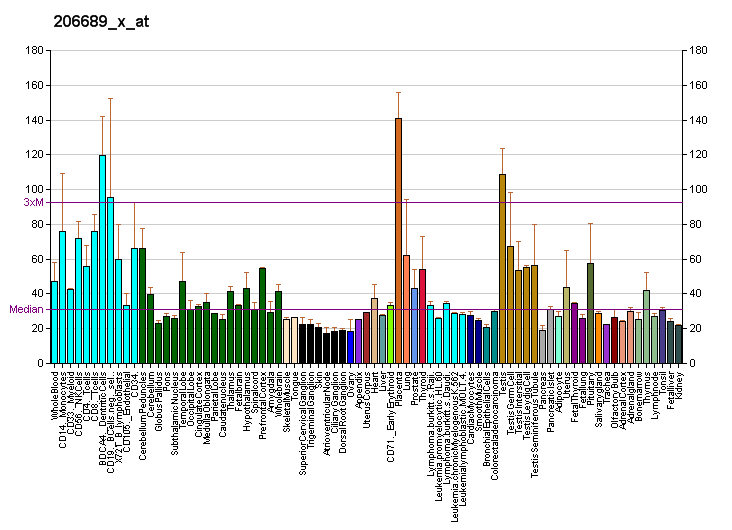

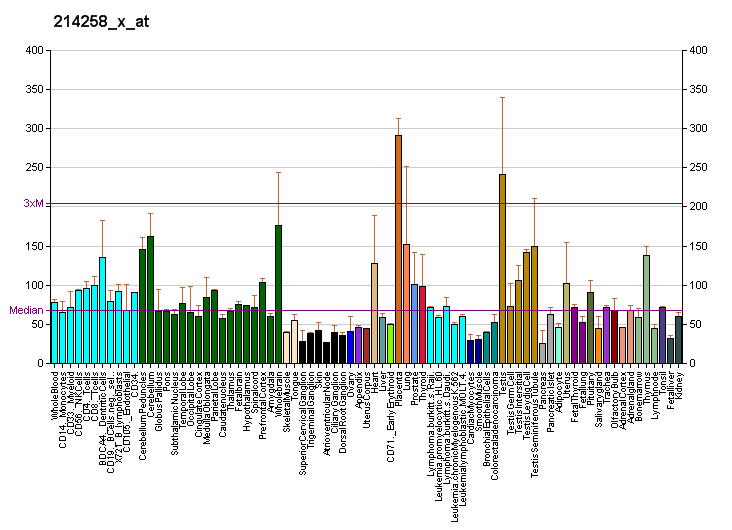

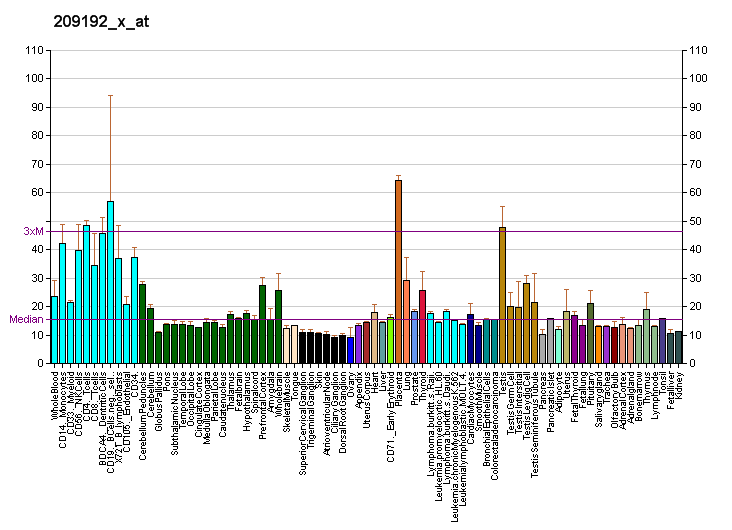
RNA expression pattern
| Bgee | Human / Mouse (ortholog); Top expressed in: right uterine tube; right lobe of thyroid gland; body of uterus; gastric mucosa; right hemisphere of cerebellum; muscle layer of sigmoid colon; left lobe of thyroid gland; left uterine tube; popliteal artery; tibial arteries / Top expressed in: neural layer of retina; spermatocyte; granulocyte; yolk sac; interventricular septum; genital tubercle; hand; ventricular zone; medial vestibular nucleus; cerebellar cortex; More reference expression data |
| BioGPS | More reference expression data |
Gene ontology
| Molecular function | transferase activity; transcription coactivator activity; metal ion binding; histone acetyltransferase activity; protein binding; androgen receptor binding; acetyltransferase activity; acyltransferase activity; H4 histone acetyltransferase activity; histone binding |
| Cellular component | cytoplasm; transcription regulator complex; Piccolo NuA4 histone acetyltransferase complex; nucleoplasm; nucleolus; perinuclear region of cytoplasm; nucleus; Swr1 complex; NuA4 histone acetyltransferase complex; histone acetyltransferase complex |
| Biological process | response to ionizing radiation; androgen receptor signaling pathway; regulation of transcription, DNA-templated; cellular response to estradiol stimulus; negative regulation of transcription by RNA polymerase II; transcription, DNA-templated; positive regulation of protein acetylation; positive regulation of transcription, DNA-templated; regulation of growth; viral process; negative regulation of transcription, DNA-templated; double-strand break repair via nonhomologous end joining; negative regulation of interleukin-2 production; positive regulation of transcription by RNA polymerase II; DNA damage response, signal transduction by p53 class mediator resulting in transcription of p21 class mediator; proteasome-mediated ubiquitin-dependent protein catabolic process; DNA replication; DNA double-strand break processing; beta-catenin-TCF complex assembly; double-strand break repair; histone acetylation; chromatin organization; histone H4 acetylation; regulation of signal transduction by p53 class mediator |
Sources:Amigo / QuickGO
Orthologs
| Databases | NCBI: entry; OMA: entry |
| Species | Human | Mouse |
| Entrez | 10524 | 81601 |
| Ensembl | ENSG00000172977 | ENSMUSG00000024926 |
| UniProt | Q92993 | Q8CHK4 |
| RefSeq (mRNA) | NM_001206833; NM_006388; NM_182709; NM_182710 | NM_001199247; NM_001199248; NM_001199249; NM_178637; NM_001362370 NM_001362371; NM_001362372 |
| RefSeq (protein) | NP_001193762; NP_006379; NP_874368; NP_874369 | NP_001186176; NP_001186177; NP_001186178; NP_848752; NP_001349299 NP_001349300; NP_001349301 |
| Location (UCSC) | Chr 11: 65.71 – 65.72 Mb | Chr 19: 5.65 – 5.66 Mb |
| PubMed search |
- Wikidata
| View/Edit Human | View/Edit Mouse |

Histone acetyltransferase KAT5 is an enzyme that in humans is encoded by the KAT5 gene. It is also commonly identified as TIP60.

The protein encoded by this gene belongs to the MYST family of histone acetyl transferases (HATs) and was originally isolated as an HIV-1 TAT-interactive protein. HATs play important roles in regulating chromatin remodeling, transcription and other nuclear processes by acetylating histone and nonhistone proteins. This protein is a histone acetylase that has a role in DNA repair and apoptosis and is thought to play an important role in signal transduction. Alternative splicing of this gene results in multiple transcript variants.

== Structure ==
The structure of KAT5 includes an acetyl CoA binding domain and a zinc finger in the MYST domain, and a CHROMO domain. Excess acetyl CoA is necessary for acetylation of histones. The zinc finger domain has been shown to aid in the acetylation process as well. The CHROMO domain aids in KAT5 ability to bind chromatin, which is important for DNA repair.

== Function ==
KAT5 enzyme is known for acetylating histones in the nucleosome, which alters binding with DNA. Acetylation neutralizes the positive charge on histones, decreasing binding affinity of negatively charged DNA. This in turn decreases steric hindrance of DNA and increases interaction of transcription factors and other proteins. Three key functions of KAT5 are its ability to regulate transcription, DNA repair, and apoptosis.

=== Transcription ===
Transcription factors such as E2F proteins and c-Myc can regulate the expression of proteins, particularly those involved with the cell cycle. KAT5 acetylates histones on genes of these transcription factors, which promote their activity.

=== DNA repair ===
KAT5 is an important enzyme for repairing DNA and returning cellular function to normal through its regulation of ataxia telangiectasia mutant (ATM) protein kinase. ATM protein kinase phosphorylates and therefore activates proteins involved in DNA repair. However, to be functional, ATM protein kinase must be acetylated by the KAT5 protein. Lack of KAT5 suppresses ATM protein kinase activity and reduces the ability of a cell to correct its DNA.

KAT5 also works later in the DNA repair process, as it serves as a cofactor for TRRAP. TRRAP enhances DNA remodeling by binding to chromatin near broken double stranded DNA sequences. KAT5 aids this recognition.

=== Apoptosis ===
P53 is well known for causing cell apoptosis after DNA damage. Acetylation of p53 by KAT5 induces this cell death. Therefore, lack of KAT5 allows cells with damaged DNA to avoid apoptosis and continue dividing.

== Regulation ==
KAT5 catalytic activity is regulated by the phosphorylation of its histones during the G2/M phase of the cell cycle. Phosphorylation of KAT5 serines 86 and 90 reduces its activity. Therefore, cancer cells with uncontrolled growth and improper G2/M checkpoints lack KAT5 regulation by cyclin dependent kinase (CDK) phosphorylation.

== Clinical relevance ==
KAT5 has many clinically significant implications that make it a useful target for diagnostic or therapeutic approaches. Most notably, KAT5 helps to regulate cancers, HIV, and neurodegenerative diseases.

=== Cancer ===
As mentioned above, KAT5 helps to repair DNA and upregualte tumor suppressors such as p53. Therefore, many cancers are marked by a reduction of KAT5 mRNA. KAT5 also is linked to metastasis and malignancy.

- Colon cancer
- Lung cancer
- Breast cancer
- Pancreatic
- Gastric cancer
- Metastatic melanoma

Studies have also shown that KAT5 augmented the ability of chemotherapy to stop tumor growth, demonstrating its potential for use in combination therapy.

However, KAT5 isn't always anti-cancer. It can enhance the activity of proteins for viruses that cause cancer such as human T-cell lymphotropic virus type-1 (HTLV), which may result in leukemia and lymphoma. Additionally, KAT5 reacts with human papillomavirus (HPV), the virus responsible for cervical cancer.

Other proteins that KAT5 promotes may lead to cancer as well. For example, overexpressed E2F1, a transcriptional factor, is implicated in melanoma progression. More research needs to be performed to clearly elucidate the overall role KAT5 has in cancer.

=== HIV ===
KAT5 binds to HIV-1 Tat transactivator and helps to promote HIV replication.

=== Aging and neurodegeneration ===
TIP60 regulates diverse cellular pathways including autophagy, DNA repair, neuronal survival, learning/memory, sleep/wake patterns, and protein turnover, all of which contribute to cellular homeostasis and organismal health so as to counteract aging and neurodegeneration.

== Interactions ==
HTATIP has been shown to interact with:

- Androgen receptor,
- BCL3,
- CREB1,
- ETV6,
- EDNRA
- FANCD2,
- HDAC7A,
- Mdm2,
- Myc, and
- PLA2G4A.
- PXR
