= Confluent and reticulated papillomatosis =

- Other names: Familial cutaneous papillomatosis, Familial occurrence of confluent and reticulated papillomatosis
- Specialty: Dermatology

Confluent and reticulated papillomatosis is an uncommon but distinctive acquired ichthyosiform dermatosis characterized by persistent dark, scaly, papules and plaques that tend to be localized predominantly on the central trunk.

== Eponym ==
Henri Gougerot and Alexandre Carteaud (1897 - 1980) originally described the condition in 1927. The cause remains unknown, but the observation that the condition may clear with Minocycline turned attention to an infectious agent. Actinomycete Dietzia strain X was isolated from one individual. Other antibiotics found useful include azithromycin, fusidic acid, clarithromycin, erythromycin, tetracycline, and cefdinir.

== See also ==
- Ichthyosis
- Acquired ichthyosis
- List of cutaneous conditions
