= Capillaritis =

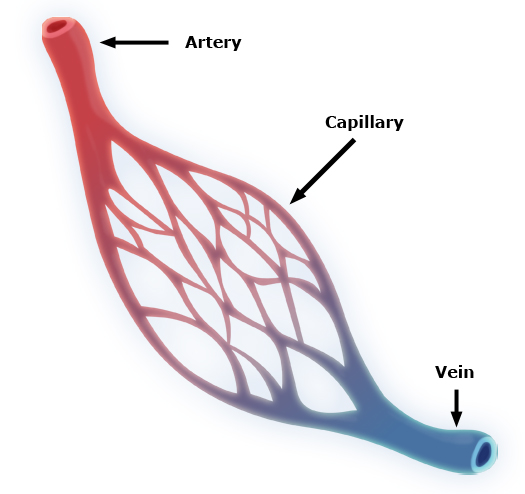
- Capillary system
- Specialty: Dermatology
- Symptoms: Small red and brown dots, or patches of red and brown
- Duration: Weeks to months

Capillaritis is where the capillaries, usually of the legs or lungs, are inflamed, allowing blood cells to pass through.

It may occur in the lungs as pulmonary capillaritis, or in the skin as pigmented purpuric dermatosis. Capillaritis usually affects otherwise healthy people.

Capillaritis can take many forms but is made up of tiny red or brown dots that may be spread out or in a group forming a red or brown patch on the skin. One variation, Majocchi purpura, forms concentric rings.

Capillaritis is a mild condition not requiring treatment. There is no known cure, however capillaritis can disappear within a few weeks, recur from time to time, or persist for years.
