= Ichthyosis acquisita =

- Other names: Acquired ichthyosis
- Specialty: Dermatology

Ichthyosis acquisita is a skin condition clinically and histologically similar to ichthyosis vulgaris.

== Presentation ==
=== Associated conditions ===
The development of ichthyosis in adulthood can be a manifestation of systemic disease, and it has been described in association with malignancies, drugs, endocrine and metabolic disease, HIV, infection, and autoimmune conditions.

It usually is associated with people who have Hodgkin's disease but it is also occurs in people with mycosis fungoides, other malignant sarcomas, Kaposi's sarcoma and visceral carcinomas. It can occur in people with leprosy, AIDS, tuberculosis, and typhoid fever.

== See also ==
- Ichthyosis
- Confluent and reticulated papillomatosis of Gougerot and Carteaud
- List of cutaneous conditions
