= Gougerot–Blum syndrome =

- Other names: Pigmented purpuric lichenoid dermatitis, and Pigmented purpuric lichenoid dermatitis of Gougerot and Blum
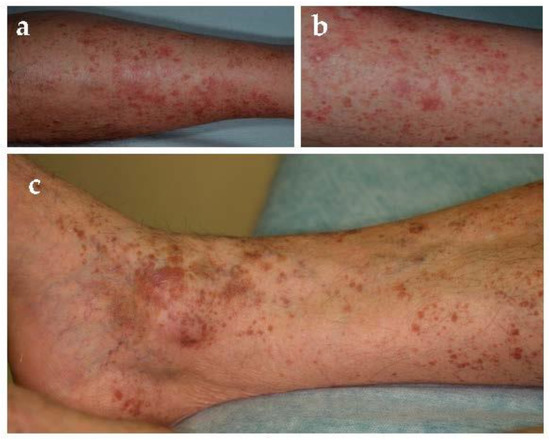
- Pigmented purpuric lichenoid dermatitis of Gougerot and Blum
- Specialty: Dermatology
- Named after: Henri Gougerot; Paul Blum

Gougerot–Blum syndrome is a variant of pigmented purpuric dermatitis, a skin condition characterized by minute, rust-colored to violaceous, lichenoid papules that tend to fuse into plaques of various hues. Relative to other variants, it is characterized clinically by a male predominance, pruritus, with a predilection for the legs, and histologically, it features a densely cellular lichenoid infiltrate.

It was characterized in 1925.

Gougerot–Blum syndrome is named after the French dermatologists Henri Gougerot (1881–1955) and Paul Blum (1878–1933).

== See also ==
- Pigmentary purpuric eruptions
- Skin lesion
- List of cutaneous conditions
