= Lichen aureus =

- Other names: Lichen purpuricus
- Specialty: Dermatology

Lichen aureus, also known as lichen purpuricus, is a skin condition characterized by the sudden appearance of one or several golden or rust-colored, closely packed macules or lichenoid papules.

== See also ==
- Pigmentary purpuric eruptions
- List of cutaneous conditions
