= Fungal folliculitis =

Inflammation of hair follicles due to fungal infection

Majocchi's granuloma
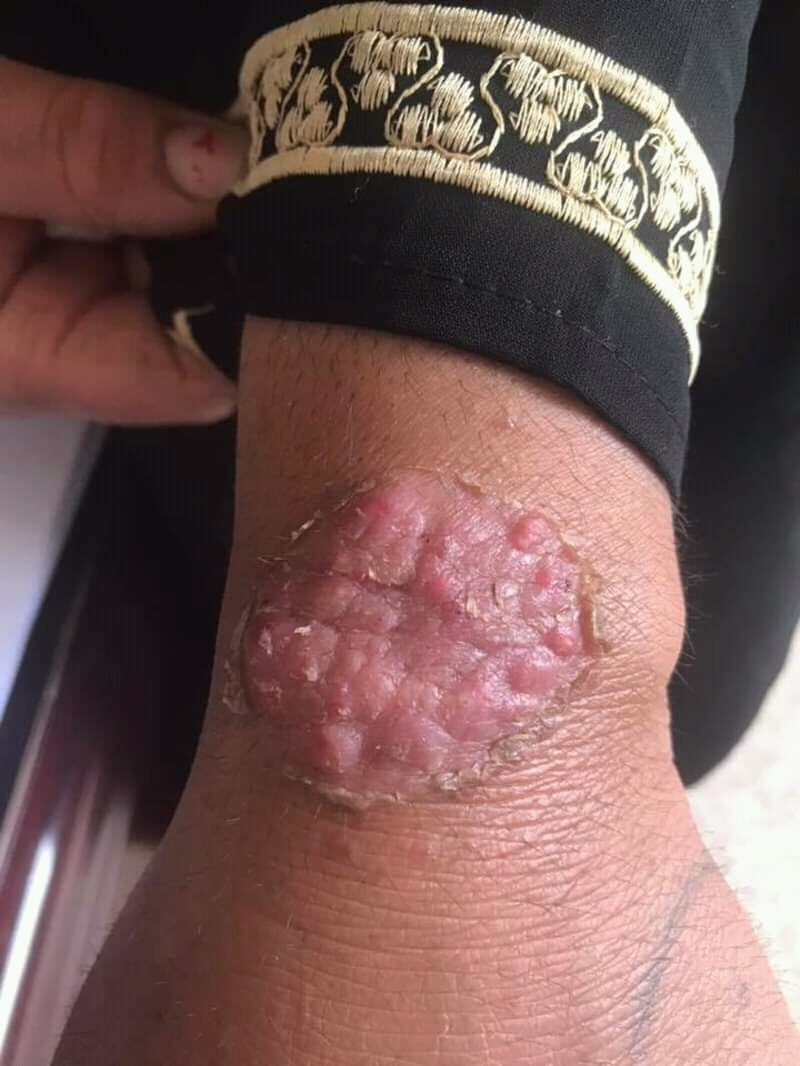
- Specialty: Dermatology

Majocchi's granuloma is a skin condition characterized by deep, pustular plaques, and is a form of tinea corporis. It is a localized form of fungal folliculitis. Lesions often have a pink and scaly central component with pustules or folliculocentric papules at the periphery. The name comes from Domenico Majocchi, who discovered the disorder in 1883. Majocchi was a professor of dermatology at the University of Parma and later the University of Bologna. This disease is most commonly caused by filamentous fungi in the genus Trichophyton.

== Symptoms and signs ==
Majocchi's granuloma often presents as pink scaly patches with pustules at the periphery. It is most common on skin exposed to mechanical abuse—wear and tear—such as the upper and lower extremities. Patients experience papules, pustules, or even plaques and nodules at the infection site. The white to red papules and pustules often have a perifollicular location. Hair shafts can be easily removed from the pustules and papules. Itching is common.

Firm or fluctuant subcutaneous nodules or abscesses represent a second form of MG that is generally observed in immunosuppressed hosts. Nodules may develop in any hair-bearing part of the body, but are most often observed on the forearms, hands, and legs of infected individuals. Involvement of the scalp and face is rarely observed. Lesions start as solitary or multiple well-circumscribed perifollicular papulopustules and nodules with or without background erythema and scaling. In rare circumstances, the lesions may have keloidal features.

== Causes ==
Majocchi's granuloma is caused by a common group of fungi called dermatophytes. Unlike traditional tinea corporis (commonly known as ringworm) that resides in the top layer of the skin, Majocchi's granuloma contains dermatophytes that invade the hair follicle and/or dermis. The invasion of the hair follicule leads to the clinically evident papules and pustules at the periphery. The most common form, the superficial perifollicular form, occurs predominately on the legs of otherwise healthy young women who repeatedly shave their legs and develop hair follicle occlusions that directly or indirectly disrupt the follicle and allow for passive introduction of the organism into the dermis. Hence, the physical barrier of the skin is important because it prevents the penetration of microorganisms. Physical factors that play a major role in inhibiting dermal invasion include the interaction among keratin production, the rate of epidermal turnover, the degree of hydration and lipid composition of the stratum corneum, CO_{2} levels, and the presence or absence of hair. Keratin and/or necrotic material can be introduced into the dermis with an infectious organism to exacerbate the problem. Majocchi granuloma also can occur as a result of the use of potent topical steroids on unsuspected tinea.

== Mechanisms ==
Historically, many types of dermatophytes were known to cause the condition. Trichophyton violaceum used to be one of the most common species of dermatophytes to cause this disease. Today, however, Trichophyton rubrum is the main culprit in most cases. These fungi are keratinophilic and colonize or infect the superficial keratinized tissues (the skin, nails, and hair) of humans and animals. The organisms are usually restricted to the non-living cornified layer of the epidermis and do not invade beyond the epidermis. The fungi are usually unable to penetrate into viable tissues in an immunocompetent host and therefore the infection incidence is higher in immune compromised individuals. The two forms of MG are:

- small, perifollicular papular form, which is a localized dermal infection that usually occurs in healthy individuals
- deep subcutaneous plaque/nodular lesion form that occurs in immunosuppressed hosts. Tinea corporis is the name of the subset of this disease that remains restricted to the stratum corneum. Otherwise, the atypical deeper involvement is known as Majocchi's granuloma. Because keratinophilic dermatophytes digest keratin, the introduction of keratin into the dermis may also act as a medium for continued growth of the organism.

== Diagnosis ==
Primary diagnosis starts with a thorough physical exam and evaluation of medical history. Often, the condition is readily apparent to a medical practitioner and no further testing is required. If not readily apparent, a skin biopsy test or fungal culture may be ordered. This pathological examination of the skin biopsy helps to arrive at the correct diagnosis via a fungal culture (mycology). In severe or recurrent cases, further workup may be required.

This disease commonly affects both immunocompetent and immunocompromised hosts. However, immunocompromised individuals have a higher risk.

== Treatment ==
Oral antifungal medications are the standard of care. Due to the location of the dermatophytes within the hair follicle, treatment with topical antifungals is often unsatisfactory. In patients with tinea pedis or onychomycosis, re-inoculation and recurrence is common. In individuals with recurrent outbreaks, inoculation sources should be identified and treated appropriately. Historical therapies include oral potassium iodide, mildly filtered local X-radiation, and topical applications of Asterol as a fungicide in both tincture and ointment forms. In modern medicine, systemic antifungals, such as griseofulvin and itraconazole, are the standard. Therapy extends over at least 4–8 weeks, and treatment continues until all lesions are cleared. Currently, no data about relapse rates or the complications of not treating Majocchi granuloma exist.

== Research ==
The review article, "Majocchi's granuloma: a symptom complex caused by fungal pathogens" concludes that the Tzanck smear method is a rapid and easy diagnostic test. In addition, histopathologic examinations reveal granulomatous folliculitis in patients with MG. It found that systemic antifungals given at an adequate dose and for an appropriate duration are the drugs of choice; in general, topical antifungals alone do not clear the fungal infections.

In "Majocchi's granumloma - Case report", the authors discuss the case of a three-year-old child who presented with lesions around her jaw. It was reported that she had been using a combination of topical corticoids, anti-fungals and antibiotics during this period. The use of these products was ineffective. Drugs were suspended after 15 days of use and followed by cutaneous biopsy and histopathological examination. Mycological examination showed the presence of hyphae and spores compatible with MG. The patient was treated with griseofulvin for 8 weeks and went into remission.

The article "Tinea Corporis Gladiatorum Presenting as a Majocchi Granuloma" discussed the importance of differential diagnosis. It includes a case report involving a 20-year-old male H who had been a part of schools wrestling team for the past six years. H presented with a 4-year history of follicular papules and pustules on his right forearm. This lesion had the typical clinical appearance. A skin biopsy showed an acute deep folliculitis compatible with a Majocchi granuloma, but fungal stainings with a Grocott stain was negative. This was the first reported case that showed that tinea corporis gladiatorum can present as a Majocchi granuloma. Thus, dermatologists must consider a Majocchi granuloma in the differential diagnosis of persistent skin lesions in wrestlers.

== See also ==
- Domenico Majocchi
- List of cutaneous conditions
