= Majocchi's disease =

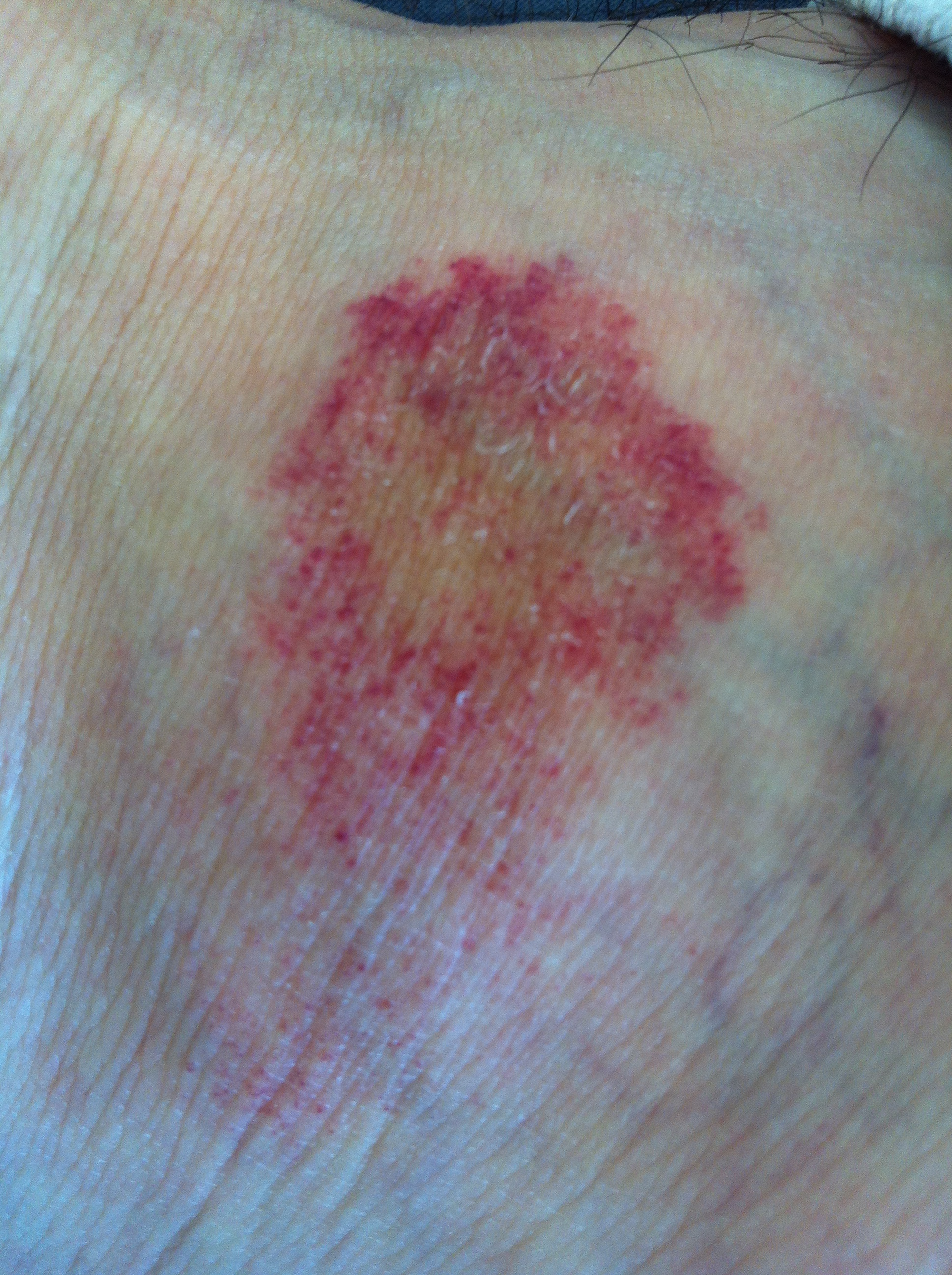
- Purpura annularis telangiectodes

Majocchi's disease, also known as Purpura annularis telangiectodes of Majocchi is a not-well-recognized and uncommon skin condition characterized by purple/bluish-red 1- to 3-cm annular patches composed of dark red telangiectases with petechiae. It is one of a group of disorders referred to as pigmented purpuric dermatosis that all occur as a result of vascular inflammation and pigment deposition.

== Signs and symptoms ==
Majocchi's disease is characterized by punctate reddish-brown macules and symmetrical, annular patches, with a tendency toward the lower extremities.

== Treatment ==
Majocchi's disease is a chronic condition for which there is no cure. It often follows a recurrent course of alternating improvement and flares. There are treatments available to help improve the symptoms for some individuals, but responses vary. Some of these treatments include the application of topical steroids and ultraviolet therapy. The use of narrowband UVB and psoralen have shown to be effective treatments for some patients with pigmented purpuric dermatoses.
