= Degos disease =

- Other names: Köhlmeier-Degos disease
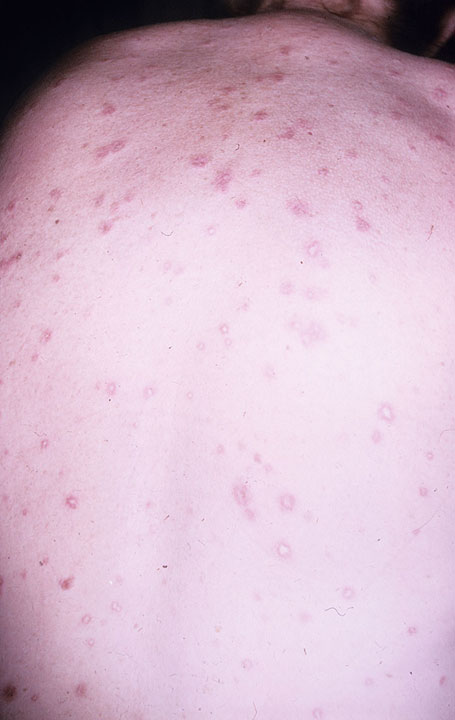
- Skin lesions in a person with Degos disease
- Specialty: Cardiology, dermatology

Degos disease, also known as Köhlmeier-Degos disease or malignant atrophic papulosis, is an extremely rare condition caused by blockage of arteries and veins. Individuals with this condition will develop papules. Those diagnosed with this disease may also develop complications due to impairment of internal organs. The exact underlying mechanism is still unknown, and an effective treatment is still being developed. There are fewer than 50 living patients presently known worldwide, and fewer than 200 reported in medical literature. However, many individuals may go undiagnosed due to rarity of the disease. Most individuals develop symptoms between the ages of 20–50; however, cases outside of this age range have been reported as well.

== Symptoms and signs ==
The characteristic symptom of Degos disease is the development of papules. Initially, individuals may have skin lesions or rashes, but they will proceed to develop distinct bumps, or papules. Papules are circular in shape, have a porcelain-white center and red border. As papules age, the white centers will sink in and only the border will remain raised. Typically, papules range from 0.5 to 1 cm in width. Papules appear on the trunk and upper extremities and are not found on the individual's palms, soles, scalp, or face.

Symptoms vary, depending on whether an individual has the benign variant or malignant variant of the disease. Both the benign and malignant forms have development of the characteristic papules. Individuals with the benign form will have the typical papules persisting anywhere from a few years to throughout their whole lives. In the benign form, no inner organs are affected. If an individual develops the malignant form, it means that not only are the papules present, but inner organs are involved. Most malignant cases involve problems of the gastrointestinal tract leading to small intestine lesions, abdominal pain, diarrhea, and bowel perforation. If the central nervous system is involved, symptoms can include headaches, dizziness, seizures, paralysis of cranial nerves, weakness, stroke, damage to small areas of the brain due to artery blockage (cerebral infarcts, and cerebral hemorrhage). Additional organs commonly impacted include the heart, lungs, and kidneys. Symptoms that may develop from damage to these organs include double vision (diplopia), clouding of lenses of eyes, swelling of the optic disc (papilledema), partial loss of vision, shortness of breath, chest pain, epilepsy, and thickening of pericardium.

Someone with the benign form may suddenly develop symptoms of the malignant form. Symptoms can last anywhere from a few weeks to several years. Onset of symptoms typically begins to manifest between the ages of 20–50. A few cases of this condition in newborns have also been described.

== Causes ==
The papules characteristic for this disease develop due to infarctions, or blockages in small-medium arteries and veins. The underlying cause is unknown for this disease. Though not confirmed, some cases have shown signs of inheritance between first-degree relatives. It has been suggested that the disease has a familial inheritance pattern; it is thought to be an autosomal dominant disorder. In most cases of familial inheritance, the benign variant of the disease has been present.

Due to the lack of knowledge of the pathomechanism for this condition prevention strategies are not known. However, in order to prevent worsening of symptoms, consistent evaluations should be conducted by a physician.

== Mechanism ==
Although this disease has been known for around 70 years, the pathomechanism underlying it is still unknown. Several hypotheses have been developed regarding the underlying mechanism for Degos disease. One theory suggests that inflammation of blood vessels may trigger the condition. Another theory has to do with Degos disease as a coagulopathy. Development of a thrombus and resulting reduction of blood flow is common in this condition. A reduction in blood flow throughout the body can lead to damaged endothelial cells and may perhaps lead to the formation of the characteristic papules. Another hypothesis suggests that abnormal swelling and proliferation of the vascular endothelium can lead to intestinal and central nervous system thrombosis, and ultimately lead to development of symptoms associated with Degos disease. Overall, individuals with Degos disease have abnormal blockages in their arteries and veins; however, the cause of these blockages is unknown.

== Diagnosis ==
Clinical evaluation and identification of characteristics papules may allow a dermatologist to diagnose Degos disease. The papules have a white center and are bordered with a red ring. After lesions begin to appear, the diagnosis for Degos disease can be supported by histological findings. Most cases will show a wedge-shaped connective tissue necrosis in the deep corium. This shape is due to the blockage/occlusion of small arteries.

Individuals may be diagnosed with the benign form if only the papules are present. However, an individual may be diagnosed with the malignant form if involvement of other organs like the lungs, intestine and/or central nervous system occurs. The malignant, or systematic form of this condition may suddenly develop even after having papules present for several years. In order to quickly diagnose this shift to the malignant variant of the disease, it is important for individuals to have consistent follow-up evaluations. In these evaluations, depending on which organs are suspected to be involved, the following procedures and tests may be conducted: skin inspection, brain magnetic resonance tomography, colonoscopy, chest X-ray, and/or abdominal ultrasound.

== Treatment ==
Due to the lack of knowledge around the underlying mechanism of malignant atrophic papulosis, an effective treatment method has not been developed. Treatment for this condition is symptomatic. However, several treatment methods have been tested and are still being developed as more information regarding the condition is found. Fibrinolytic and immunosuppressive therapeutic regimens were tested and found to be mostly unsuccessful as treatment methods.

After treating conditions comorbid with Degos disease, physicians have recently found improvement in symptoms with the use of eculizumab and treprostinil. Discovered by dermatopathologist, Cynthia Magro, response to eculizumab is often immediate and dramatic, but has been of limited duration and is expensive, needing to be infused every 14 days. Treprostinil use has been reported to result in clearing of gastrointestinal and central nervous system findings as well as clearing of cutaneous lesions, but reports are limited. Treprostinil may be more effective than other vasodilators because it may also increase the population of circulating endothelial cells, allowing angiogenesis.

== Recent research ==
A patient diagnosed with the malignant, systemic form of the disease and was severely ill was found to have C5b-9 complexes in the involved vessels of the skin biopsy. Eculizumab was then used for treatment of the thrombotic microangiopathy, a humanized monoclonal antibody drug which is normally used in the treatment of Paroxysmal nocturnal hemoglobinuria. The patient experienced a dramatic improvement in his condition. Physicians at Albany Medical College were later able to treat a pediatric Degos patient with eculizumab.

The team later observed the resolution of Degos skin lesions in an adult patient with an overlap syndrome involving systemic lupus, systemic sclerosis, and Degos disease who was treated with treprostinil for their pulmonary hypertension. They noted the pediatric Degos patient was developing significant complications despite treatment with eculizumab, so treprostinil was incorporated into the treatment. All known long-term survivors of systemic Degos disease are being treated with a combination of eculizumab and treprostinil.

== History ==
In 1941, this disease was first described by Köhlmeier. However, it was not until 1942 that the disease was recognized as a new clinical entity by Robert Degos. Initially the condition was referred to as Degos disease or Köhlmeier-Degos disease. However, Degos himself subsequently suggested the name "papulose atrophiante maligne," translated as malignant atrophic papulosis.
