= Pigmented purpuric dermatosis =

- Other names: Progressive pigmentary dermatosis, Purpura pigmentosa chronica, Pigmentary purpuric eruptions, or Progressive pigmenting purpura or Schamberg's disease
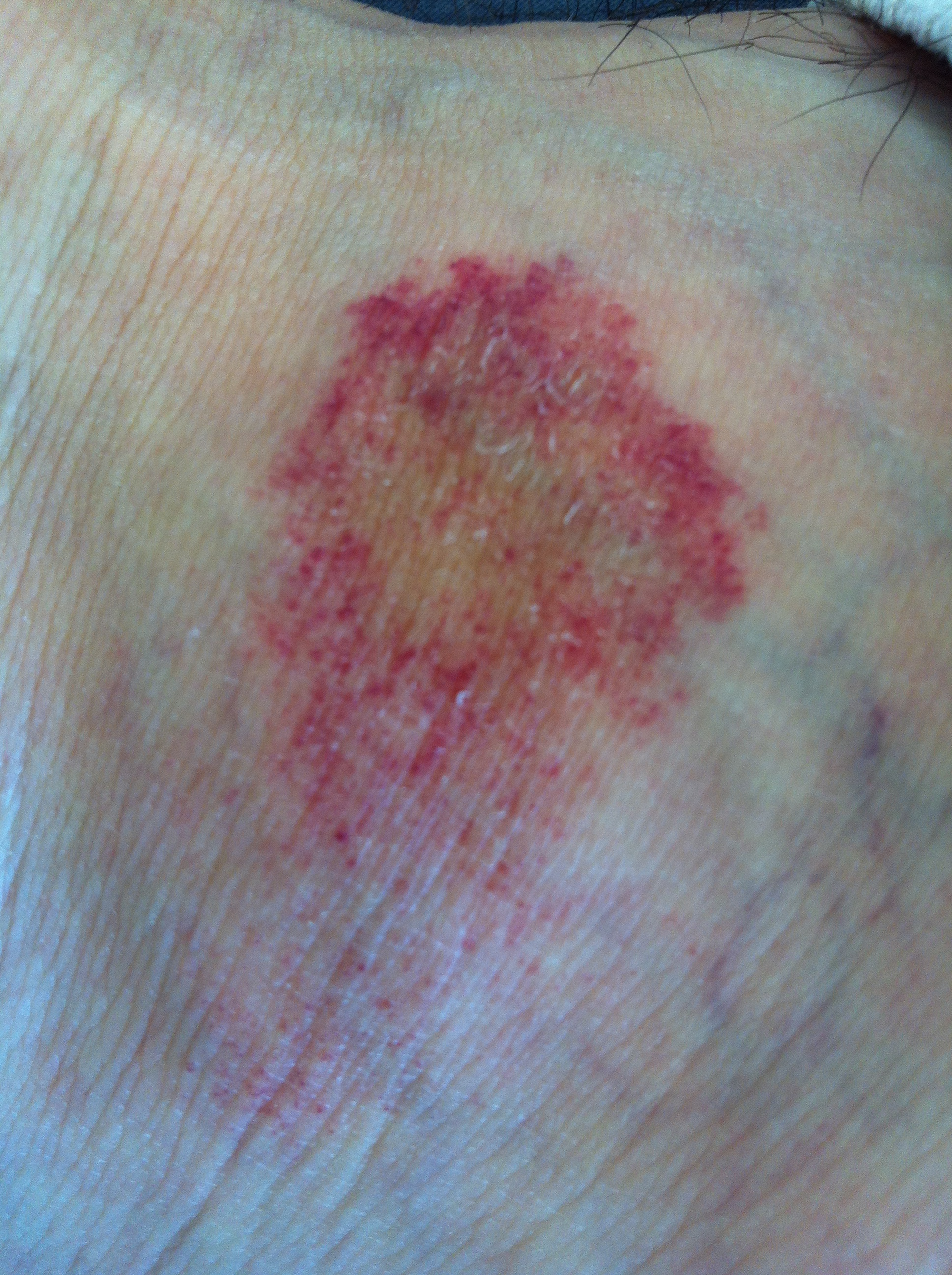
- Specialty: Dermatology

Pigmented purpuric dermatosis refers to one of the three major classes of skin conditions characterized by purpuric skin eruptions.

Pigmented purpuric dermatosis are distinguished from other purpura by size (0.3–1 cm) and are most often seen in the lower extremities. Pigmentary purpuric eruptions may present with one of several clinical patterns. There may be overlapping characteristics among pigmented purpuric dermatosis and between their signs and those of other purpuric eruptions. Examples of the pigmented purpuric dermatosis group include:

- Schamberg's disease
- Majocchi's disease (Purpura annularis telangiectodes)
- Gougerot-Blum syndrome (Pigmented purpuric lichenoid dermatitis)
- Ducas and Kapetanakis pigmented purpura
- Lichen aureus

Although vascular damage may be present, it is insufficient for these conditions to be considered forms of vasculitis.

A few very small non-blinded studies of treatment with narrow-band ultraviolet light have been reported as promising.

== See also ==
- Purpura
- Skin lesion
- List of cutaneous conditions
