= Henri Gougerot =

French dermatologist

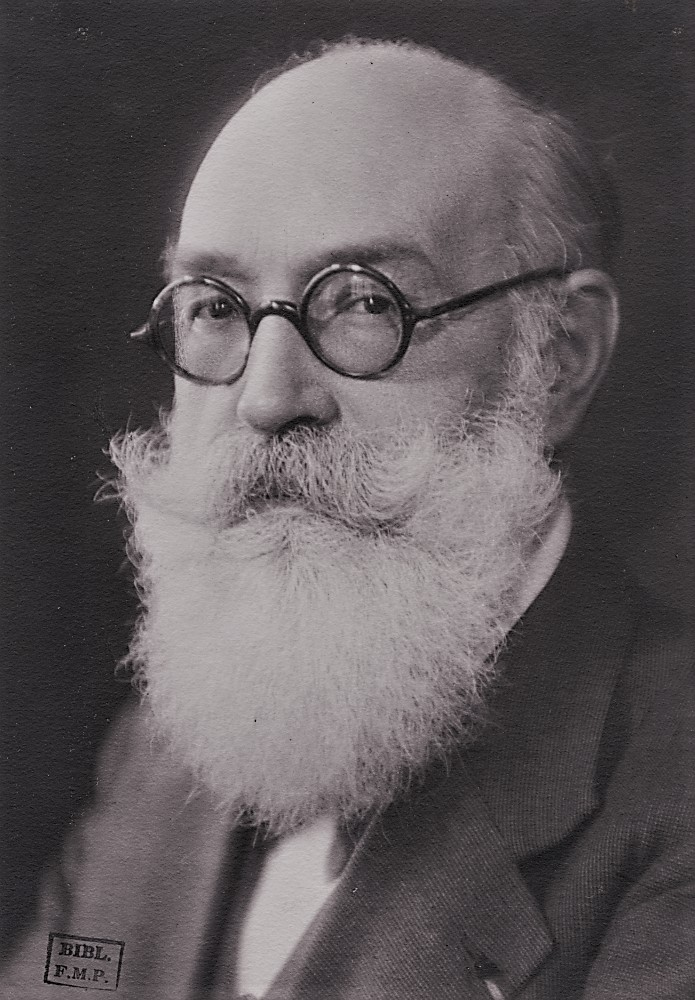
Henri Gougerot

Henri Gougerot (July 2, 1881 – January 15, 1955) was a French dermatologist born in Saint-Ouen-sur-Seine. Gougerot is remembered for his work with numerous dermatological disorders.

In 1908 he earned his doctorate from the University of Paris, and shortly afterwards was professor agrégé at the faculty of medicine. In 1928 he was appointed to the chair of dermatology and syphilology, becoming chief physician at the Hôpital Saint-Louis. For his achievements during World War I, he was awarded the French Croix de Guerre.

With Charles Lucien de Beurmann (1851–1923), he conducted extensive research of fungal diseases that included pioneer studies of sporotrichosis. In 1925 he described three separate cases of atrophy of the salivary glands associated with dryness of the eyes, mouth and vagina. Several years later, Swedish ophthalmologist Henrik Sjögren (1899–1986) wrote a detailed and comprehensive report of the disease in Zur Kenntnis der keratoconjunctivitis sicca (To the knowledge of keratoconjunctivitis sicca). Today this autoimmune disease is known as Sjögren's syndrome, however it is sometimes referred to as Gougerot–Sjögren syndrome.

Gougerot was a prolific writer of over 2500 articles. He was the publisher of Archives dermato-syphiligraphiques de la clinique de l'hôpital Saint-Louis, and with Ferdinand-Jean Darier (1856–1938) and Raymond Jacques Adrien Sabouraud (1864–1938), was editor of Nouvelle Pratique Dermatologique; an eight-volume work on dermatology.

In 1928 he was appointed president of the Société française de prophylaxie sanitaire et morale, and in 1940 became a member of the Académie de Médecine.

The eponymous Gougerot's trilogy is named after him, defined as disease with three main dermatological symptoms (erythematous papular lesions, purpuric macules, and dermal/dermohypodermal nodules) that typically affect the thighs and legs. Described by Gougerot in the treatise Trisymptome atypique. It is also known as Gougerot's disease.

== Selected works ==
- Mycoses nouvelles: l'hémisporose. Ostéite humaine primitive du tibia due à l'Hémispora Stellata; with Pierre Jean Baptiste Caraven, (1911)
- Les nouvelles mycoses; with Charles Lucien de Beurmann, (1911)
- Les sporotrichoses; with Charles Lucien de Beurmann, (1912)
- Bacillo-tuberculose non folliculaire, (1913)
- Insuffisance progressive et atrophie des glandes salivaires et muqueuses de la bouche, des conjonctives (et parfois de muqueuses, nasale, laryngée, vulvaire). 'Serecheresse' de la bouche, des conjonctives, etc. Bulletin de la Société française de dermatologie et de syphiligraphie, Paris, 1925, 32: 376.
- Le traitement de la syphilis en clientèle, 1914; 3rd edition, 1927
- Trisymptome atypique. Bulletin de la Société française de dermatologie et de syphiligraphie, Paris, 1951, 58: 386.

== See also ==
- Confluent and reticulated papillomatosis of Gougerot and Carteaud
- Gougerot–Blum syndrome
- Tumid lupus erythematosus
