= Raymond Sabouraud =

French physician

Raymond Jacques Adrien Sabouraud
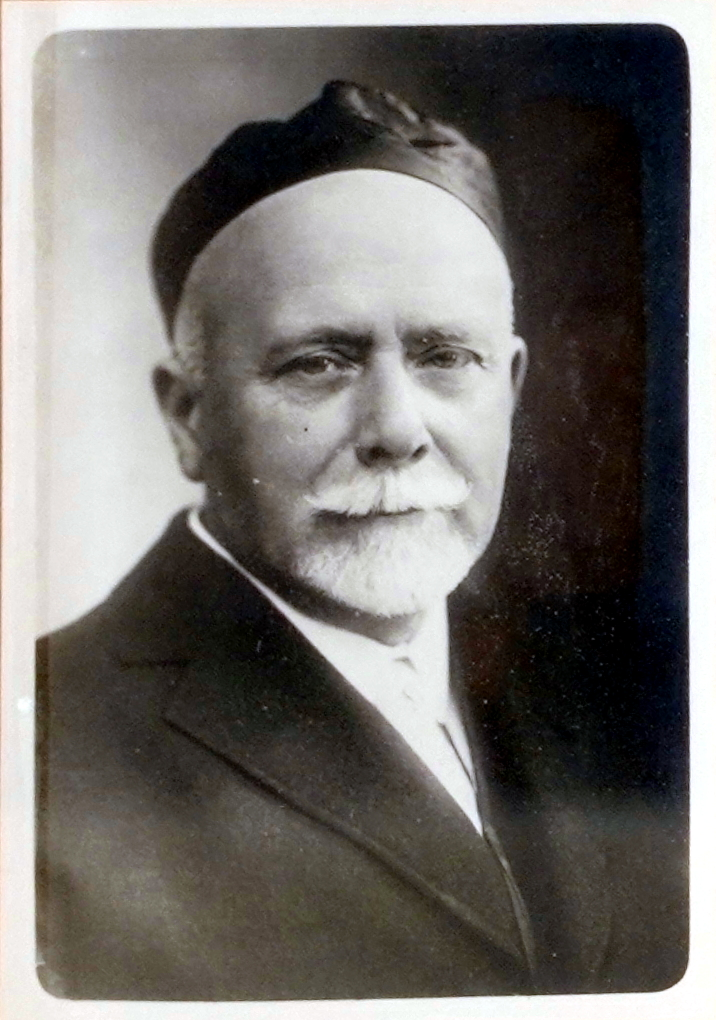
- Born: November 24, 1864; Nantes France
- Died: February 4, 1938 (aged 73); Paris France
- Medical career
- Field: dermatology, mycology

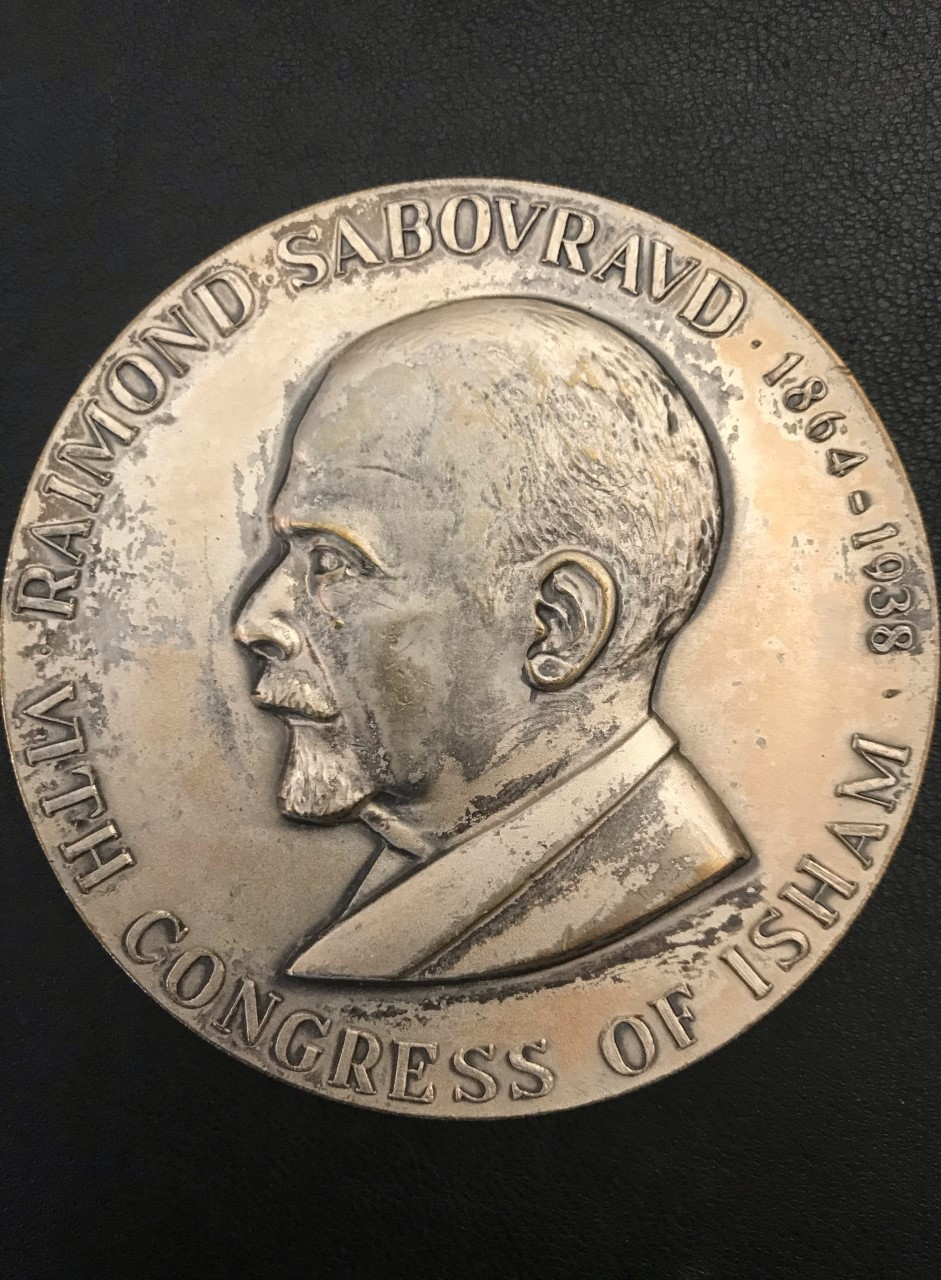
Sabouraud Raymond

Raymond Jacques Adrien Sabouraud (French pronunciation: [ʁɛmɔ̃ ʒak adʁijɛ̃ sabuʁo]; 24 November 1864 – 4 February 1938) was a French physician born in Nantes. He specialized in dermatology and mycology, and was also an accomplished painter and sculptor.

He studied medicine in Nantes and Paris, and worked as a hospital interne at the Hôpital Saint-Louis under Ernest Besnier and at the Hôpital des Enfants-Assistés under Edouard Francis Kirmisson. Afterwards he studied bacteriology with Pierre Paul Émile Roux at the Pasteur Institute. In 1894 he received his doctorate, and he later served as chief of Jean Alfred Fournier's laboratory at the Hôpital Saint-Louis.

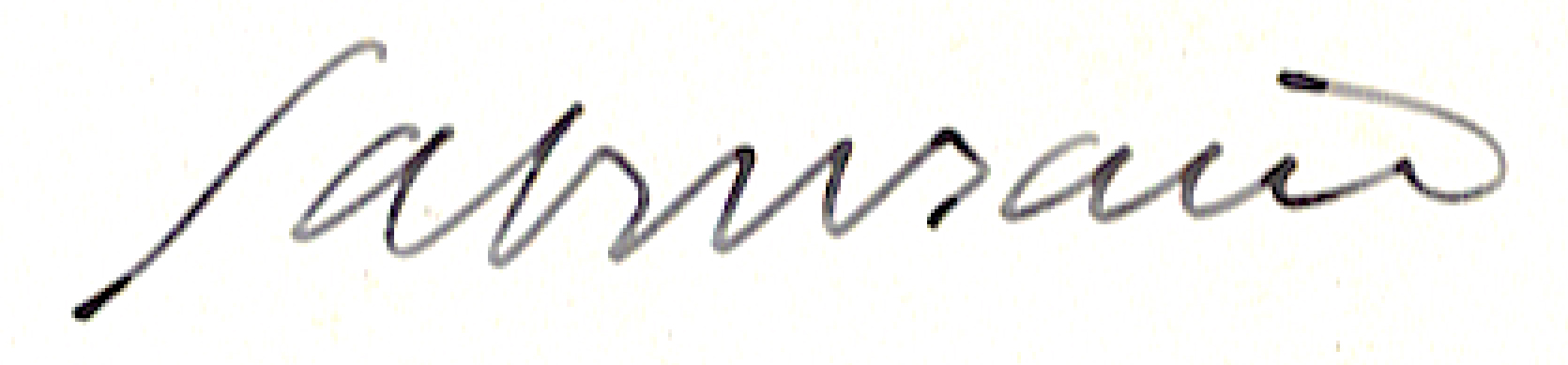
Raymond Sabouraud signature in frontispiece of copy of Les Teignes (1910)

In 1904, Sabouraud introduced radiological treatment against ringworm of the scalp. He was well known for his knowledge of scalp diseases, and had a clinic which attracted patients from all over the world.

He invented a method to select fungi with a medium of low pH and a rather high concentration of sugar. This medium, called Sabouraud agar is named after him.

With Ferdinand-Jean Darier (1856–1938) and Henri Gougerot (1881–1955), he was the editor of an eight-volume encyclopedia of dermatology titled Nouvelle Pratique Dermatologique. His Manuel élémentaire de dermatologie topographique régionale (1905), was translated into English and published as Elementary Manual of Regional Topographical Dermatology (1906), and several years later re-published as A Manual of Regional Topographical Dermatology (1912).

== Associated eponyms ==
- Sabouraud's agar: a growth medium for micro-organisms that is selective for fungi.
- Gruby–Sabouraud disease: a disease caused by Microsporon audouini; named with microbiologist David Gruby (1810–1898)
- Sabouraud's method: radiological treatment of ringworm
- Sabouraud's pastils: disks containing barium platino-cyanide that undergo a color change when exposed to X-rays
- Sabouraud's syndrome: Monilethrix, a congenital disease with early progressive loss of hair
- Sabouraud–Noiré instrument: a dosimeter that measures the quantity of X-rays via the barium platino-cyanide method
- Temporal Triangular Alopecia of Sabouraud — described by Raymond Sabouraud in 1905 as "congenital triangular alopecia" — is a benign, non-scarring, and non-inflammatory condition characterized by a lack of hair growth in the frontotemporal region.
