= Carboxylesterase type B =

Family of evolutionarily related proteins

Carboxylesterase
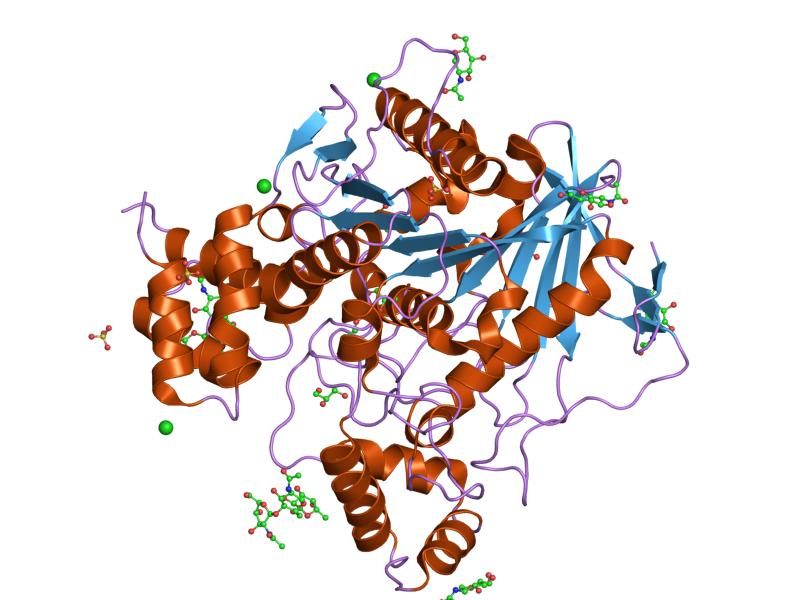
- Structure of ethylphosphorylated Butyrylcholinesterase.

Identifiers
- Symbol: COesterase
- Pfam: PF00135
- InterPro: IPR002018
- PROSITE: PDOC00112
- SCOP2: 1acj / SCOPe / SUPFAM
- OPM superfamily: 127
- OPM protein: 1p0i
- CDD: cd00312
Available protein structures:
- PDB: IPR002018 PF00135 (ECOD; PDBsum)
- AlphaFold: IPR002018; PF00135

Carboxylesterase, type B is a family of evolutionarily related proteins that belongs to the superfamily of proteins with the Alpha/beta hydrolase fold.

Higher eukaryotes have many distinct esterases. The different types include those that act on carboxylic esters (EC 3.1.1). Carboxyl-esterases have been classified into three categories (A, B and C) on the basis of differential patterns of inhibition by organophosphates. The sequence of a number of type-B carboxylesterases indicates that the majority are evolutionarily related. As is the case for lipases and serine proteases, the catalytic apparatus of esterases involves three residues (catalytic triad): a serine, a glutamate or aspartate and a histidine.

== Subfamilies ==
- Neuroligin InterPro: IPR000460
- Cholinesterase InterPro: IPR000997

== Examples ==
Human genes that encode proteins containing the carboxylesterase domain include:

- ACHE
- ARACHE
- BCHE
- CEL
- CES1
- CES2
- CES3
- CES4
- CES7
- CES8
- NLGN1
- NLGN2
- NLGN3
- NLGN4X
- NLGN4Y
- TG

== See also ==
- Carboxylesterase
