= NLGN1 =

Protein-coding gene in the species Homo sapiens

Identifiers
- Aliases: NLGN1, NL1, neuroligin 1
- External IDs: OMIM: 600568; MGI: 2179435; GeneCards: NLGN1
Available structures
PDB	Ortholog search: PDBe RCSB
PDB	List of PDB id codes 3B3Q

Gene location (Human)
Chr.	Chromosome 3 (human)
Band	3q26.31	Start	173,396,284 bp
Band	3q26.31	End	174,294,372 bp

Gene location (Mouse)
Chr.	Chromosome 3 (mouse)
Band	3|3 A3	Start	25,480,379 bp
Band	3|3 A3	End	26,386,609 bp
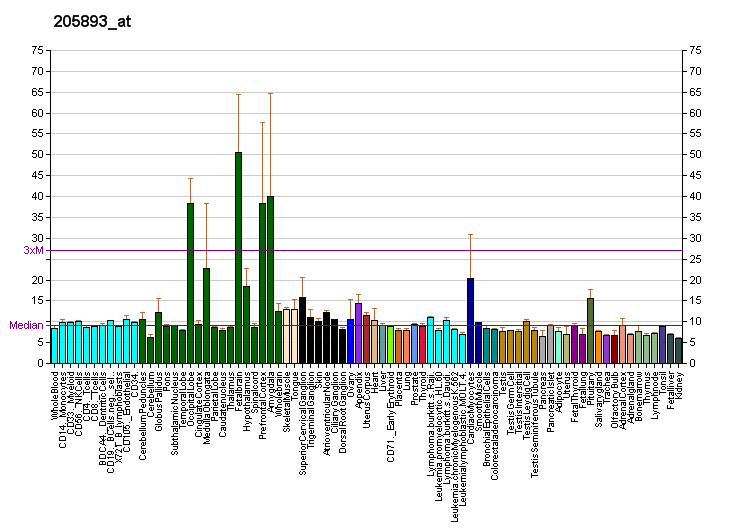
RNA expression pattern
Bgee	Human / Mouse (ortholog); Top expressed in: ventricular zone; endothelial cell; sural nerve; Achilles tendon; ganglionic eminence; stromal cell of endometrium; testicle; buccal mucosa cell; entorhinal cortex; corpus callosum / Top expressed in: olfactory tubercle; lumbar subsegment of spinal cord; piriform cortex; substantia nigra; dentate gyrus; anterior amygdaloid area; ventromedial nucleus; dentate gyrus of hippocampal formation granule cell; lateral septal nucleus; globus pallidus; More reference expression data
BioGPS	More reference expression data
Gene ontology
Molecular function	PDZ domain binding; protein dimerization activity; cell adhesion molecule binding; scaffold protein binding; carboxylic ester hydrolase activity; neurexin family protein binding; amyloid-beta binding; signaling receptor activity
Cellular component	synapse; integral component of membrane; NMDA selective glutamate receptor complex; Golgi apparatus; cell junction; dendritic shaft; filopodium tip; dendritic spine; postsynaptic membrane; membrane; dendrite; excitatory synapse; external side of plasma membrane; cell surface; presynapse; postsynaptic density; plasma membrane; integral component of postsynaptic membrane; integral component of plasma membrane; spanning component of membrane; postsynapse; glutamatergic synapse; asymmetric, glutamatergic, excitatory synapse; integral component of postsynaptic specialization membrane
Biological process	NMDA glutamate receptor clustering; positive regulation of ruffle assembly; positive regulation of synaptic vesicle exocytosis; regulation of AMPA receptor activity; rhythmic process; positive regulation of synaptic transmission, glutamatergic; heterophilic cell-cell adhesion via plasma membrane cell adhesion molecules; positive regulation of circadian sleep/wake cycle, wakefulness; regulation of respiratory gaseous exchange by nervous system process; calcium-dependent cell-cell adhesion via plasma membrane cell adhesion molecules; protein heterotetramerization; synaptic vesicle transport; terminal button organization; synapse organization; positive regulation of synaptic transmission, GABAergic; postsynaptic density protein 95 clustering; receptor localization to synapse; protein localization to synapse; neurexin clustering involved in presynaptic membrane assembly; positive regulation of synaptic vesicle endocytosis; synaptic vesicle targeting; protein homooligomerization; positive regulation of protein localization to synapse; neuron projection development; protein targeting; positive regulation of intracellular signal transduction; long-term potentiation; nervous system development; AMPA glutamate receptor clustering; neuronal signal transduction; synaptic vesicle clustering; positive regulation of synaptic vesicle clustering; cytoskeletal matrix organization at active zone; synapse assembly; establishment of protein localization; modulation of chemical synaptic transmission; positive regulation of filopodium assembly; cell adhesion; regulation of neuron differentiation; neuron cell-cell adhesion; positive regulation of dendritic spine development; regulation of NMDA receptor activity; positive regulation of excitatory postsynaptic potential; negative regulation of dendritic spine morphogenesis; positive regulation of synapse assembly; excitatory synapse assembly; positive regulation of presynaptic active zone assembly; retrograde trans-synaptic signaling by trans-synaptic protein complex; synaptic vesicle endocytosis; postsynaptic membrane assembly; presynaptic membrane assembly; cellular response to calcium ion; postsynaptic specialization assembly; presynapse assembly; regulation of presynapse organization; synaptic membrane adhesion; neuron projection arborization
Sources:Amigo / QuickGO
Orthologs
Databases	NCBI: entry; OMA: entry
Species	Human	Mouse
Entrez	22871	192167
Ensembl	ENSG00000169760	ENSMUSG00000063887
UniProt	Q8N2Q7	Q99K10
RefSeq (mRNA)	NM_014932; NM_001365923; NM_001365924; NM_001365925; NM_001365926 NM_001365927; NM_001365928; NM_001365929; NM_001365930; NM_001365931; NM_001365932; NM_001365933; NM_001365934; NM_001365935; NM_001365936	NM_001163387; NM_138666; NM_001357095; NM_001357096; NM_001357097
RefSeq (protein)	NP_055747; NP_001352852; NP_001352853; NP_001352854; NP_001352855 NP_001352856; NP_001352857; NP_001352858; NP_001352859; NP_001352860; NP_001352861; NP_001352862; NP_001352863; NP_001352864; NP_001352865	NP_001156859; NP_619607; NP_001344024; NP_001344025; NP_001344026
Location (UCSC)	Chr 3: 173.4 – 174.29 Mb	Chr 3: 25.48 – 26.39 Mb
PubMed search
- Wikidata
View/Edit Human	View/Edit Mouse

Neuroligin-1 is a protein that in humans is encoded by the NLGN1 gene.

This gene encodes a member of the neuroligin family of neuronal cell surface proteins. Neuroligin-1 acts as splice site-specific ligand for β-neurexins and has been shown to localize to the postsynaptic compartment at excitatory synapses and is involved in the formation and remodeling of central nervous system synapses.

== Interactions ==
NLGN1 has been shown to interact with NRXN1 and DLG4.

== See also ==
- Neurexins: NRXN1, NRXN2, NRXN3
