= Carboxylesterase =

Class of enzymes

carboxylesterase

Identifiers
- EC no.: 3.1.1.1
- CAS no.: 9016-18-6

Databases
- BRENDA: enzyme data
- ExPASy: NiceZyme view
- KEGG: enzyme entry
- MetaCyc: metabolic pathway
- Rhea: reactions
- PDB structures: RCSB PDB PDBe PDBsum
- Gene Ontology: AmiGO / QuickGO
Search
- PMC: articles
- PubMed: articles
- NCBI: proteins

The enzyme carboxylesterase (or carboxylic-ester hydrolase, EC 3.1.1.1; systematic name carboxylic-ester hydrolase) catalyzes reactions of the following form:

a carboxylic ester + H_{2}O $\rightleftharpoons$ an alcohol + a carboxylate

Most enzymes from this group are serine hydrolases belonging to the superfamily of proteins with α/β hydrolase fold. Some exceptions include an esterase with β-lactamase-like structure (PDB: 1ci8).

Carboxylesterases are widely distributed in nature, and are common in mammalian liver. Many participate in phase I metabolism of xenobiotics such as toxins or drugs; the resulting carboxylates are then conjugated by other enzymes to increase solubility and eventually excreted. The essential polyunsaturated fatty acid arachidonic acid (AA C_{20}H_{32}O_{2}; 20:4, n-6), formed by the synthesis from dietary linoleic acid (LA: C_{18}H_{32}O_{2} 18:2, n-6), has a role as a human carboxylesterase inhibitor.

The carboxylesterase family of evolutionarily related proteins (those with clear sequence homology to each other) includes a number of proteins with different substrate specificities, such as acetylcholinesterases.

== Examples ==
- acetylcholinesterase
- ali-esterase,
- B-esterase,
- butyrate esterase,
- butyryl esterase,
- carboxylesterase 1
- carboxylesterase 2
- carboxylesterase 3
- esterase A,
- esterase B,
- esterase D,
- methylbutyrase,
- methylbutyrate esterase,
- monobutyrase,
- procaine esterase,
- propionyl esterase,
- triacetin esterase,
- vitamin A esterase, and
- cocaine esterase

The last enzyme also participates in alkaloid biosynthesis.

== Genes ==
Humans genes that encode carboxylesterase enzymes include:

- CES1
- CES2
- CES3
- CES4
- CES7
- CES8

An approved nomenclature has been established for the five mammalian carboxylesterase gene families.
