= NRXN2 =

Protein-coding gene in the species Homo sapiens

Identifiers
- Aliases: NRXN2, neurexin 2
- External IDs: OMIM: 600566; MGI: 1096362; GeneCards: NRXN2
Available structures
PDB	Ortholog search: PDBe RCSB
PDB	List of PDB id codes 4NXR

Gene location (Human)
Chr.	Chromosome 11 (human)
Band	11q13.1	Start	64,606,174 bp
Band	11q13.1	End	64,723,197 bp

Gene location (Mouse)
Chr.	Chromosome 19 (mouse)
Band	19 A|19	Start	6,468,761 bp
Band	19 A|19	End	6,594,199 bp
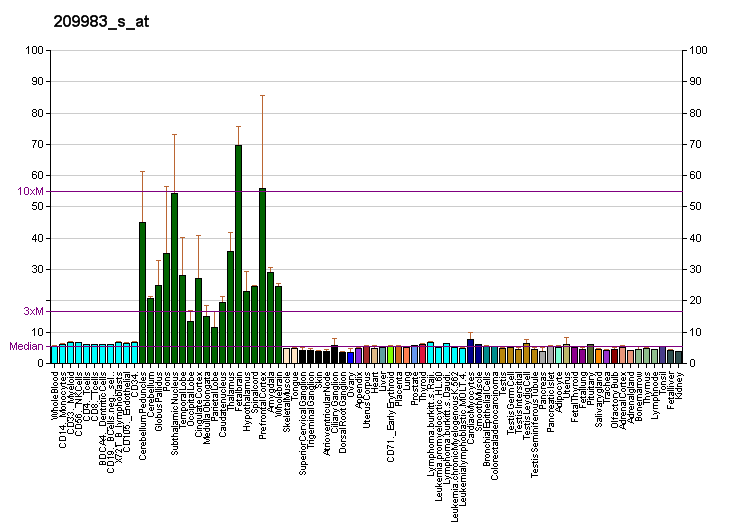

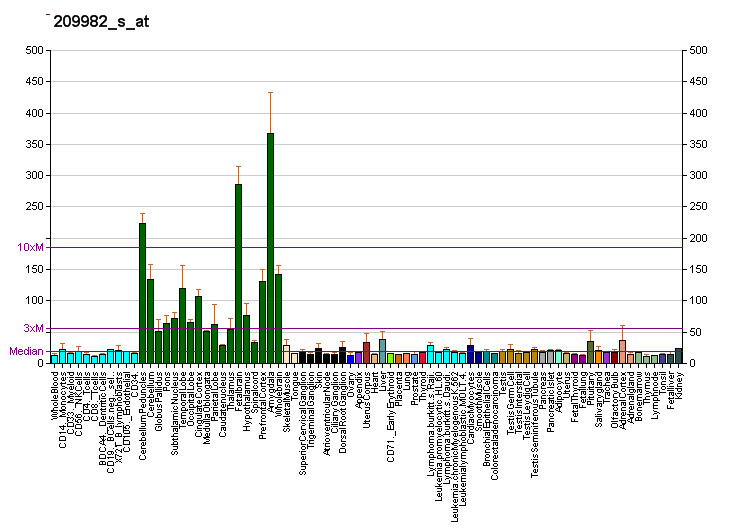
RNA expression pattern
Bgee	Human / Mouse (ortholog); Top expressed in: right hemisphere of cerebellum; prefrontal cortex; right frontal lobe; amygdala; cingulate gyrus; anterior cingulate cortex; Brodmann area 9; ganglionic eminence; paraflocculus of cerebellum; cerebellar vermis / Top expressed in: cerebellum; cerebellar cortex; olfactory bulb; primary visual cortex; superior frontal gyrus; hypothalamus; striatum of neuraxis; dentate gyrus of hippocampal formation granule cell; hippocampus proper; layer of retina; More reference expression data
BioGPS	More reference expression data
Gene ontology
Molecular function	neuroligin family protein binding; transmembrane signaling receptor activity; cell adhesion molecule binding; calcium channel regulator activity; metal ion binding
Cellular component	integral component of membrane; membrane; plasma membrane; presynapse; protein-containing complex
Biological process	neuron cell-cell adhesion; cell adhesion; signal transduction; gephyrin clustering involved in postsynaptic density assembly; postsynaptic density protein 95 clustering; vocalization behavior; vocal learning; neuroligin clustering involved in postsynaptic membrane assembly; adult behavior; postsynaptic membrane assembly; social behavior; synapse assembly; neurotransmitter secretion; chemical synaptic transmission
Sources:Amigo / QuickGO
Orthologs
Databases	NCBI: entry; OMA: entry
Species	Human	Mouse
Entrez	9379	18190
Ensembl	ENSG00000110076	ENSMUSG00000033768
UniProt	P58401; Q9P2S2	E9Q7X7
RefSeq (mRNA)	NM_015080; NM_138732; NM_138734; NM_001376262; NM_001376263 NM_001376265; NM_001376266; NM_001376267; NM_001400681; NM_001400682	NM_001205234; NM_001205235; NM_020253; NM_001369363
RefSeq (protein)	NP_055895; NP_620060; NP_620063; NP_001363191; NP_001363192 NP_001363194; NP_001363195; NP_001363196; NP_055895.1; NP_620060.1	NP_001192163; NP_001192164; NP_064649; NP_001356292
Location (UCSC)	Chr 11: 64.61 – 64.72 Mb	Chr 19: 6.47 – 6.59 Mb
PubMed search
- Wikidata
View/Edit Human	View/Edit Mouse

Neurexin-2-alpha is a protein that in humans is encoded by the NRXN2 gene.

Neurexins are a family of proteins that function in the vertebrate nervous system as cell adhesion molecules and receptors. They are encoded by several unlinked genes of which two, NRXN1 and NRXN3, are among the largest known human genes. Three of the genes (NRXN1-3) utilize two alternate promoters and include numerous alternatively spliced exons to generate thousands of distinct mRNA transcripts and protein isoforms. The majority of transcripts are produced from the upstream promoter and encode alpha-neurexin isoforms; a much smaller number of transcripts are produced from the downstream promoter and encode beta-neurexin isoforms. The alpha-neurexins contain epidermal growth factor-like (EGF-like) sequences and laminin G domains, and have been shown to interact with neurexophilins. The beta-neurexins lack EGF-like sequences and contain fewer laminin G domains than alpha-neurexins.
