= Genes to Cognition Project =

Genes to Cognition (G2C) is a neuroscience research programme that studies genes, the brain and behaviour in an integrated manner. It is engaged in a large-scale investigation of the function of molecules found at the synapse. This is mainly focused on proteins that interact with the NMDA receptor, a receptor for the neurotransmitter, glutamate, which is required for processes of synaptic plasticity such as long-term potentiation (LTP). One key discovery that led to the G2C project was the characterization of a group of proteins that interact with this receptor, called the "NMDA Receptor Complex (NRC)" and the observation that dysfunctions of many of these proteins are characteristic of numerous diseases of the nervous system. The NRC contains 185 proteins, 48 of which have so far been implicated in 54 human nervous system disorders. The molecular evolution of the NRC is also an active area of research, and it has been shown that an increase in the complexity of these signaling proteins at synapses has evolved alongside the enhanced cognitive capacities of humans and other higher vertebrates.

== Scientific Strategy ==
The activities of the Genes to Cognition Project encompass a wide range of scientific specialisms, reflecting the diversity of information that must be integrated to advance understanding of the brain. Following from synapse proteomics experiments to identify candidate proteins for further investigation, G2C has undertaken to knock out many of these by gene targeting in mice and has established a number of high-throughput platforms for evaluating the effect of these genetic manipulations on brain function.

== Information Sharing ==
As well as sharing findings through open access articles in the scientific literature, Genes to Cognition maintains a database, G2Cdb and an educational web site, G2Conline.

=== G2Cdb: Genes to Cognition Database ===
G2Cdb integrates information curated from the scientific literature and numerous online databases about genes and diseases of interest to Genes to Cognition. It also provides access to lists of genes derived from proteomics experiments characterising the composition of the complex of proteins present at the postsynaptic density. It will also provide data from experiments investigating the effects of genetic manipulation of these synaptic molecules.

=== G2Conline: Educational Web Site ===
G2Conline is an interactive educational website that provides extensive background information on key topics in neuroscience and brain disorders. There are many video clips of interviews with scientists, including Nobel laureates James Watson and Eric Kandel.

== See also ==
- The Human Genome Project
- The 1000 Genomes Project
