= CES3 =

CES3 may refer to:

- Carboxylesterase 3, an enzyme encoded by the CES3 gene
- Edmonton/St. Albert (Delta Helicopters) Heliport, a heliport in Canada, location identifier CES3
