= LRRTM1 =

Protein-coding gene in the species Homo sapiens

Identifiers
- Aliases: LRRTM1, entrez:347730, leucine rich repeat transmembrane neuronal 1
- External IDs: OMIM: 610867; MGI: 2389173; HomoloGene: 41763; GeneCards: LRRTM1; OMA:LRRTM1 - orthologs

Gene location (Human)
Chr.	Chromosome 2 (human)
Band	2p12	Start	80,288,351 bp
Band	2p12	End	80,304,752 bp

Gene location (Mouse)
Chr.	Chromosome 6 (mouse)
Band	6|6 C3	Start	77,219,672 bp
Band	6|6 C3	End	77,234,774 bp
RNA expression pattern
Bgee	Human / Mouse (ortholog); Top expressed in: lateral nuclear group of thalamus; prefrontal cortex; nucleus accumbens; caudate nucleus; middle temporal gyrus; putamen; Brodmann area 9; cingulate gyrus; anterior cingulate cortex; right frontal lobe / Top expressed in: lateral geniculate nucleus; medial dorsal nucleus; medial geniculate nucleus; hippocampus proper; barrel cortex; subiculum; temporal lobe; dentate gyrus; piriform cortex; nucleus accumbens; More reference expression data
BioGPS	n/a
Gene ontology
Molecular function	protein kinase inhibitor activity; molecular function
Cellular component	integral component of membrane; postsynaptic membrane; membrane; growth cone; plasma membrane; synapse; excitatory synapse; cell surface; axon; cell junction; endoplasmic reticulum; extracellular space; extracellular matrix; glutamatergic synapse; GABA-ergic synapse; integral component of postsynaptic membrane; integral component of postsynaptic specialization membrane
Biological process	locomotory behavior; negative regulation of protein kinase activity; cytokine-mediated signaling pathway; negative regulation of receptor internalization; synapse organization; exploration behavior; protein localization to synapse; long-term potentiation; negative regulation of receptor signaling pathway via JAK-STAT; positive regulation of synapse assembly; biological process; regulation of postsynaptic density assembly; regulation of presynapse assembly
Sources:Amigo / QuickGO
Orthologs
Species	Human	Mouse
Entrez	347730	74342
Ensembl	ENSG00000162951	ENSMUSG00000060780
UniProt	Q86UE6	Q8K377
RefSeq (mRNA)	NM_178839	NM_028880; NM_001362109
RefSeq (protein)	NP_849161	NP_083156; NP_001349038
Location (UCSC)	Chr 2: 80.29 – 80.3 Mb	Chr 6: 77.22 – 77.23 Mb
PubMed search
- Wikidata
View/Edit Human	View/Edit Mouse

LRRTM1 is a brain-expressed imprinted gene that encodes a leucine-rich repeat transmembrane protein that interacts with neurexins and neuroligins to modulate synaptic cell adhesion in neurons. As the name implies, its protein product is a transmembrane protein that contains many leucine rich repeats. It is expressed during the development of specific forebrain structures and shows a variable pattern of maternal downregulation (genomic imprinting).

== Clinical significance ==
LRRTM1 is the first gene linked to increased odds of being left-handed, when inherited from the father's side. Possessing one particular variant of the LRRTM1 gene slightly raises the risk of psychotic mental illnesses such as schizophrenia, again only if inherited from the father's side. As well, LRRTM1 has been associated with measures of schizotypy in non-clinical populations, indicating that the gene may have shared effects on neurodevelopment in both healthy and unhealthy individuals and individuals with schizophrenia.

LRRTM1 is also critically involved in synapse formation within the dorsal lateral geniculate nucleus (dLGN) of mice. LRRTM1 aids in the assembly of complex retinogeniculate synapses in mice, which are believed to help process complex visual signals. Lack of this gene shows decreased performance in complex visual tasks.

== See also ==
- Handedness
