= FAM81A =

Human gene and protein

Identifiers
- Aliases: FAM81A, family with sequence similarity 81 member A
- External IDs: MGI: 1924136; HomoloGene: 17584; GeneCards: FAM81A; OMA:FAM81A - orthologs

Gene location (Human)
Chr.	Chromosome 15 (human)
Band	15q22.2	Start	59,372,693 bp
Band	15q22.2	End	59,523,555 bp

Gene location (Mouse)
Chr.	Chromosome 9 (mouse)
Band	9|9 D	Start	69,995,793 bp
Band	9|9 D	End	70,049,842 bp
RNA expression pattern
Bgee	Human / Mouse (ortholog); Top expressed in: Brodmann area 9; prefrontal cortex; cingulate gyrus; anterior cingulate cortex; middle temporal gyrus; right frontal lobe; primary visual cortex; Brodmann area 23; right uterine tube; rectum / Top expressed in: Epithelium of choroid plexus; piriform cortex; temporal lobe; amygdala; primary motor cortex; Region I of hippocampus proper; fourth ventricle; choroid plexus of fourth ventricle; prefrontal cortex; visual cortex; More reference expression data
BioGPS	n/a
Orthologs
Species	Human	Mouse
Entrez	145773	76886
Ensembl	ENSG00000157470	ENSMUSG00000032224
UniProt	Q8TBF8	Q3UXZ6
RefSeq (mRNA)	NM_152450	NM_029784
RefSeq (protein)	NP_689663	NP_084060
Location (UCSC)	Chr 15: 59.37 – 59.52 Mb	Chr 9: 70 – 70.05 Mb
PubMed search
- Wikidata
View/Edit Human	View/Edit Mouse

FAM81A is a protein that in humans is encoded by the FAM81A gene which is expressed in the postsynaptic density of the brain. It plays a pivotal role in forming postsynaptic protein agglomerations, essential for synaptic function in the brain.
