= COLQ =

Protein-coding gene in humans

Available structures
PDB	Ortholog search: PDBe RCSB
PDB	List of PDB id codes 1VZJ

Identifiers
- Aliases: COLQ, EAD, CMS5, collagen-like tail subunit (single strand of homotrimer) of asymmetric acetylcholinesterase, collagen like tail subunit of asymmetric acetylcholinesterase
- External IDs: OMIM: 603033; MGI: 1338761; HomoloGene: 10437; GeneCards: COLQ; OMA:COLQ - orthologs

Gene location (Human)
Chr.	Chromosome 3 (human)
Band	3p25.1	Start	15,450,133 bp
Band	3p25.1	End	15,521,751 bp

Gene location (Mouse)
Chr.	Chromosome 14 (mouse)
Band	14|14 B	Start	31,245,039 bp
Band	14|14 B	End	31,313,300 bp
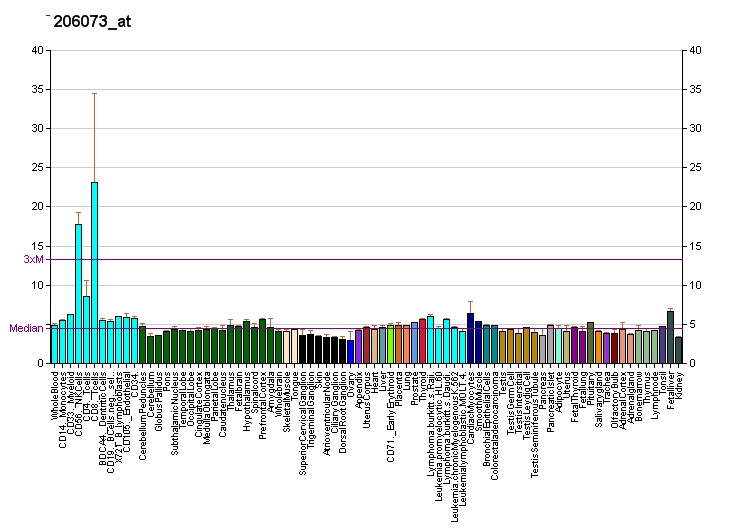
RNA expression pattern
Bgee	Human / Mouse (ortholog); Top expressed in: right uterine tube; muscle of thigh; granulocyte; Skeletal muscle tissue of rectus abdominis; testicle; apex of heart; right auricle of heart; sural nerve; cerebellar hemisphere; right hemisphere of cerebellum / Top expressed in: thymus; pons; medulla oblongata; spinal cord; primary motor cortex; inferior colliculi; muscle of thigh; choroid plexus; heart; spleen; More reference expression data
BioGPS	More reference expression data
Gene ontology
Molecular function	protein binding; extracellular matrix structural constituent; heparin binding
Cellular component	collagen; neuromuscular junction; synapse; synaptic cleft; extracellular space; plasma membrane; cell junction; basement membrane; extracellular matrix; collagen-containing extracellular matrix
Biological process	establishment of protein localization to membrane; regulation of synaptic assembly at neuromuscular junction; acetylcholine catabolic process in synaptic cleft; skeletal muscle acetylcholine-gated channel clustering; neurotransmitter catabolic process; extracellular matrix organization
Sources:Amigo / QuickGO
Orthologs
Species	Human	Mouse
Entrez	8292	382864
Ensembl	ENSG00000206561	ENSMUSG00000057606
UniProt	Q9Y215	O35348
RefSeq (mRNA)	NM_080544; NM_005677; NM_080538; NM_080539; NM_080540 NM_080541; NM_080542; NM_080543	NM_009937
RefSeq (protein)	NP_005668; NP_536799; NP_536800	NP_034067
Location (UCSC)	Chr 3: 15.45 – 15.52 Mb	Chr 14: 31.25 – 31.31 Mb
PubMed search
- Wikidata
View/Edit Human	View/Edit Mouse

Acetylcholinesterase collagenic tail peptide also known as AChE Q subunit, acetylcholinesterase-associated collagen, or ColQ is the collagen-tail subunit of acetylcholinesterase found in the neuromuscular junction. In humans it is encoded by the COLQ gene.

== Function ==
This gene encodes the subunit of a collagen-like molecule associated with acetylcholinesterase in skeletal muscle. Each molecule is composed of three identical subunits. Each subunit contains a proline-rich attachment domain (PRAD) that binds an acetylcholinesterase tetramer to anchor the catalytic subunit of the enzyme to the basal lamina. Multiple transcript variants encoding different isoforms have been found for this gene.

== Clinical significance ==
Mutations in this gene are associated with endplate acetylcholinesterase deficiency and one of the causes of the neuromuscular disease, congenital myasthenia gravis.
