= NRXN1 =

Protein-coding gene in the species Homo sapiens

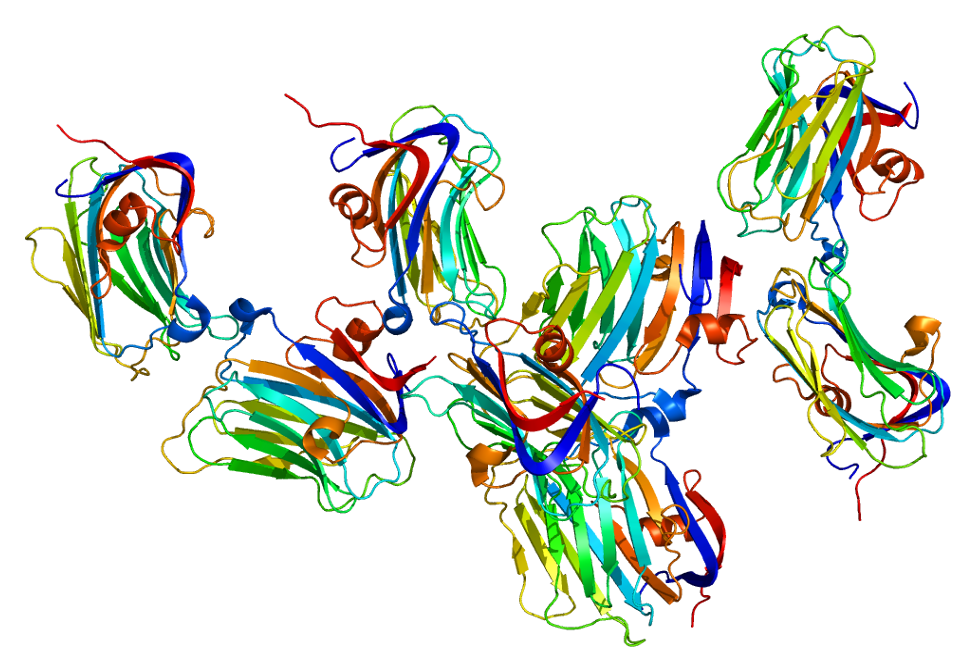

Identifiers
- Aliases: NRXN1, Hs.22998, PTHSL2, SCZD17, neurexin 1
- External IDs: OMIM: 600565; MGI: 1096391; GeneCards: NRXN1
Available structures
PDB	Ortholog search: PDBe RCSB
PDB	List of PDB id codes 3B3Q

Gene location (Human)
Chr.	Chromosome 2 (human)
Band	2p16.3	Start	49,918,503 bp
Band	2p16.3	End	51,225,575 bp

Gene location (Mouse)
Chr.	Chromosome 17 (mouse)
Band	17|17 E5	Start	90,033,631 bp
Band	17|17 E5	End	91,093,071 bp
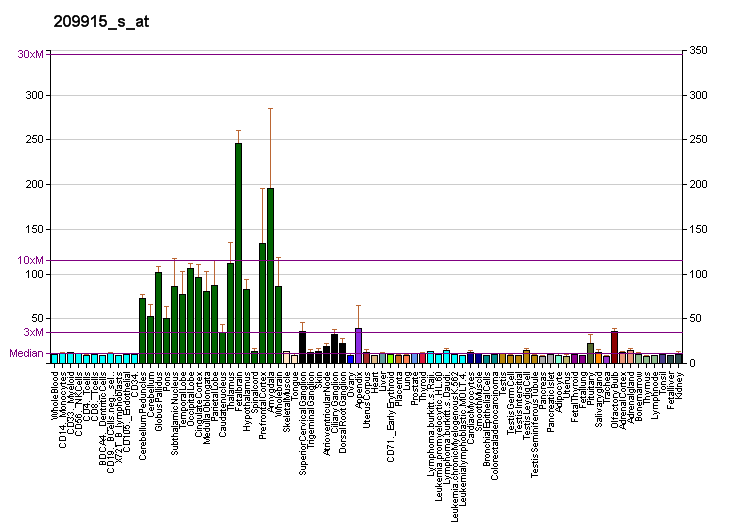

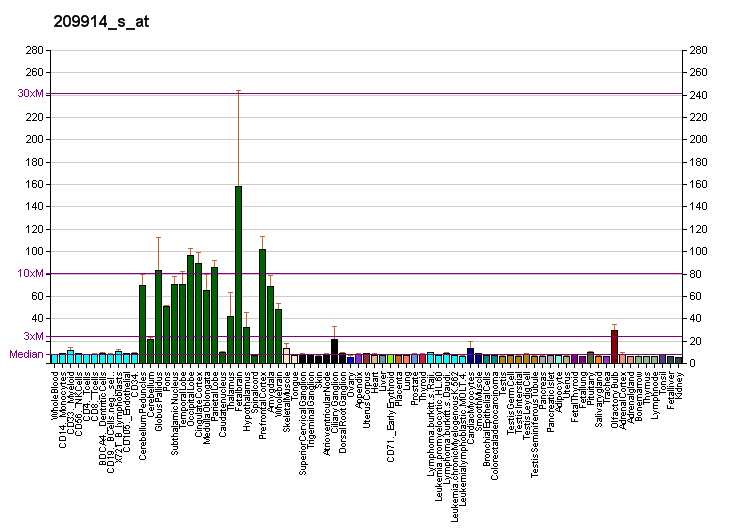

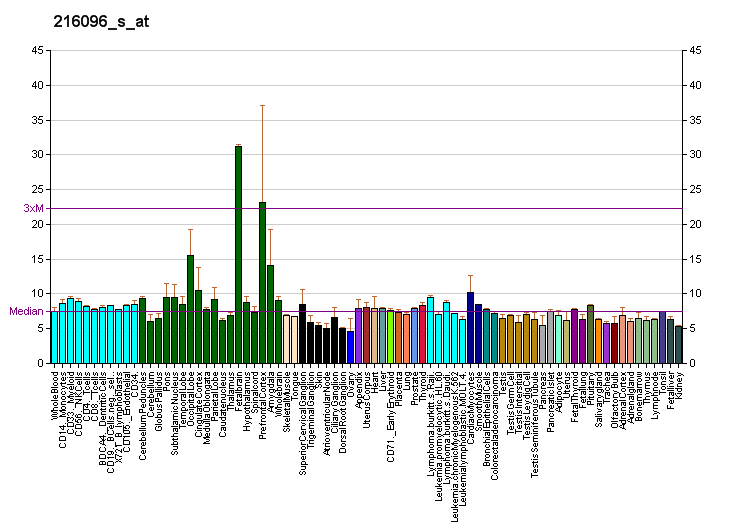
RNA expression pattern
Bgee	Human / Mouse (ortholog); Top expressed in: sural nerve; middle temporal gyrus; superior frontal gyrus; parietal lobe; postcentral gyrus; Brodmann area 23; entorhinal cortex; primary visual cortex; ventricular zone; lateral nuclear group of thalamus / Top expressed in: medial dorsal nucleus; medial geniculate nucleus; lateral geniculate nucleus; anterior amygdaloid area; cingulate gyrus; primary motor cortex; dentate gyrus; prefrontal cortex; piriform cortex; dentate gyrus of hippocampal formation granule cell; More reference expression data
BioGPS	More reference expression data
Gene ontology
Molecular function	metal ion binding; calcium-dependent protein binding; neuroligin family protein binding; signaling receptor binding; transmembrane signaling receptor activity; cell adhesion molecule binding; protein binding; type 1 fibroblast growth factor receptor binding; calcium ion binding; acetylcholine receptor binding; calcium channel regulator activity; signaling receptor activity
Cellular component	integral component of membrane; vesicle; nuclear membrane; membrane; endocytic vesicle; axonal growth cone; synapse; cell surface; cell junction; soma; endoplasmic reticulum; presynaptic membrane; plasma membrane; integral component of presynaptic membrane; presynapse; integral component of plasma membrane; nucleolus; protein-containing complex; Schaffer collateral - CA1 synapse; glutamatergic synapse; GABA-ergic synapse; integral component of presynaptic active zone membrane
Biological process	calcium-dependent cell-cell adhesion via plasma membrane cell adhesion molecules; receptor localization to synapse; heterophilic cell-cell adhesion via plasma membrane cell adhesion molecules; NMDA glutamate receptor clustering; establishment of protein localization; neuron cell-cell adhesion; gamma-aminobutyric acid receptor clustering; neuronal signal transduction; gephyrin clustering involved in postsynaptic density assembly; postsynaptic density protein 95 clustering; learning; regulation of AMPA receptor activity; negative regulation of filopodium assembly; presynaptic membrane assembly; regulation of NMDA receptor activity; vocalization behavior; neuroligin clustering involved in postsynaptic membrane assembly; adult behavior; positive regulation of synaptic transmission, glutamatergic; postsynaptic membrane assembly; cell adhesion; angiogenesis; positive regulation of excitatory postsynaptic potential; social behavior; guanylate kinase-associated protein clustering; synapse assembly; protein-containing complex assembly involved in synapse maturation; synaptic vesicle clustering; protein localization to synapse; signal transduction; cerebellar granule cell differentiation; positive regulation of synapse assembly; positive regulation of presynaptic active zone assembly; positive regulation of protein localization to plasma membrane; positive regulation of gene expression; negative regulation of gene expression; positive regulation of protein kinase A signaling; neuron projection development; positive regulation of peptidyl-serine phosphorylation; positive regulation of fibroblast growth factor receptor signaling pathway; positive regulation of protein kinase B signaling; positive regulation of ERK1 and ERK2 cascade; cellular response to calcium ion; positive regulation of protein kinase C activity; vocal learning; chemical synaptic transmission; regulation of insulin secretion involved in cellular response to glucose stimulus; axon guidance; prepulse inhibition; neuromuscular process controlling balance; positive regulation of synapse maturation; neurotransmitter secretion; regulation of grooming behavior; synaptic membrane adhesion; regulation of synaptic vesicle cycle; regulation of postsynaptic specialization assembly; regulation of presynapse assembly; regulation of postsynaptic density assembly; trans-synaptic signaling by endocannabinoid
Sources:Amigo / QuickGO
Orthologs
Databases	NCBI: entry; OMA: entry
Species	Human	Mouse
Entrez	9378	18189
Ensembl	ENSG00000179915	ENSMUSG00000024109
UniProt	P58400; Q9ULB1; Q49A31	P0DI97; Q9CS84
RefSeq (mRNA)	NM_001135659; NM_004801; NM_138735; NM_001320156; NM_001320157 NM_001330077; NM_001330078; NM_001330079; NM_001330081; NM_001330082; NM_001330083; NM_001330084; NM_001330085; NM_001330086; NM_001330087; NM_001330088; NM_001330089; NM_001330090; NM_001330091; NM_001330092; NM_001330093; NM_001330094; NM_001330095; NM_001330096; NM_001330097	NM_020252; NM_177284; NM_001346957; NM_001346958; NM_001346959 NM_001346960; NM_001346961; NM_001346962; NM_001347419
RefSeq (protein)	NP_001129131; NP_001307085; NP_001307086; NP_001317006; NP_001317007 NP_001317008; NP_001317010; NP_001317011; NP_001317012; NP_001317013; NP_001317014; NP_001317015; NP_001317016; NP_001317017; NP_001317018; NP_001317019; NP_001317020; NP_001317021; NP_001317022; NP_001317023; NP_001317024; NP_001317025; NP_001317026; NP_004792; NP_620072; NP_001129131.1; NP_004792.1; NP_620072.1; NP_004792.1; NP_004792.1; NP_620072.1	NP_001333886; NP_001333887; NP_001333888; NP_001333889; NP_001333890 NP_001333891; NP_001334348; NP_064648; NP_796258; NP_001390248; NP_001390249; NP_001390250; NP_001390251; NP_001390252; NP_001390253; NP_001390254; NP_001390255; NP_001390256; NP_001390257; NP_001390258; NP_001390259; NP_001390260; NP_001390261; NP_064648.3; NP_796258.2
Location (UCSC)	Chr 2: 49.92 – 51.23 Mb	Chr 17: 90.03 – 91.09 Mb
PubMed search
- Wikidata
View/Edit Human	View/Edit Mouse

Neurexin-1-alpha is a protein that in humans is encoded by the NRXN1 gene.

Neurexins are a family of proteins that function in the vertebrate nervous system as cell adhesion molecules and receptors. They are encoded by several unlinked genes of which two, NRXN1 and NRXN3, are among the largest known human genes. Three of the genes (NRXN1-3) utilize two alternate promoters and include numerous alternatively spliced exons to generate thousands of distinct mRNA transcripts and protein isoforms. The majority of transcripts are produced from the upstream promoter and encode alpha-neurexin isoforms; a much smaller number of transcripts are produced from the downstream promoter and encode beta-neurexin isoforms. The alpha-neurexins contain epidermal growth factor-like (EGF-like) sequences and laminin G domains, and have been shown to interact with neurexophilins. The beta-neurexins lack EGF-like sequences and contain fewer laminin G domains than alpha-neurexins.

== Function ==
Neurexins are presynaptic membrane cell-adhesion molecules that bind primarily to neuroligins, proteins that have been associated with autism. Autism is characterized by a wide range of social and cognitive deficits, which are partially attributed to faulty synaptic communication between neurons. This lack of communication is oftentimes tied to mutations in NRXN1. Structural variants of NRXN1a (neurexin1 alpha) are consistent with mutations predisposing autism. These alpha neurexins are involved in communication through coupling mechanisms of calcium channels and vesicle exocytosis, to ensure that neurotransmitters are properly released. They are specifically required for glutamate and GABA release. Implications of neurexin involvement in autism have been determined through deletion in coding exons of NRXN1a, particularly in knockout mice models. These mice showed impaired social functioning, decreased motor response in new situations, and increased aggressive behavior in males. Social functioning was of major relevance for this gene and its association with autism spectrum disorder.

== Genomics ==
The gene is found in a single copy on the short arm of chromosome 2 (2p16.3). The gene is 1,112,187 bases in length, is located on the Crick (minus) strand and encodes a protein of 1,477 amino acids (molecular weight 161.883 kDa).

Mutations of this gene that interrupt its expression have been associated with schizophrenia, autism, and intellectual disability (NRXN1 mutations and brain disorders).

== Interactions ==
NRXN1 has been shown to interact with NLGN1.
