= PRIMA1 =

Protein-coding gene in the species Homo sapiens

Identifiers
- Aliases: PRIMA1, PRIMA, proline rich membrane anchor 1
- External IDs: OMIM: 613851; MGI: 1926097; HomoloGene: 15783; GeneCards: PRIMA1; OMA:PRIMA1 - orthologs

Gene location (Mouse)
Chr.	Chromosome 12 (mouse)
Band	12|12 E	Start	103,163,167 bp
Band	12|12 E	End	103,208,409 bp
RNA expression pattern
Bgee	Human / Mouse (ortholog); Top expressed in: tibial nerve; sural nerve; left uterine tube; gastric mucosa; smooth muscle tissue; fundus; substantia nigra; canal of the cervix; transverse colon; prostate / Top expressed in: muscle of thigh; lumbar subsegment of spinal cord; superior frontal gyrus; embryo; epithelium of stomach; facial motor nucleus; neural layer of retina; superior cervical ganglion; anterior horn of spinal cord; primary visual cortex; More reference expression data
BioGPS	n/a
Gene ontology
Molecular function	protein-membrane adaptor activity
Cellular component	integral component of membrane; cell junction; plasma membrane; synapse; membrane
Biological process	neurotransmitter catabolic process
Sources:Amigo / QuickGO
Orthologs
Species	Human	Mouse
Entrez	145270	170952
Ensembl	n/a	ENSMUSG00000041669
UniProt	Q86XR5	Q810F0
RefSeq (mRNA)	NM_178004; NM_178013	NM_133364; NM_178023
RefSeq (protein)	NP_821092; NP_821092.1	NP_579942
Location (UCSC)	n/a	Chr 12: 103.16 – 103.21 Mb
PubMed search
- Wikidata
View/Edit Human	View/Edit Mouse

Proline-rich membrane anchor 1, also known as PRiMA, is a protein that in humans is encoded by the PRIMA1 gene.

== Function ==
PRiMA functions to organize acetylcholinesterase (AChE) into tetramers, and to anchor AChE at neural cell membranes. This is accomplished by the proline rich anchor domain (PRAD) of PRIMA1 which anchors the tetramer of AChE into the plasma membrane of neural cells and myocytes. The PRAD interacts with the C-terminal T-peptide of AChE.

PRiMA plays a role in targeting AChE to the cell surface and, in neuroblastoma cells, PRiMA the limiting factor of such targeting. In both mice and humans, PRiMA exists as two alternative splice variants that differ in their cytoplasmic regions.

== Clinical significance ==
The severity of neurogenerative diseases, such as Alzheimer’s, can be related to the degradation of AChE.
