= NLGN4X =

Protein-coding gene in humans

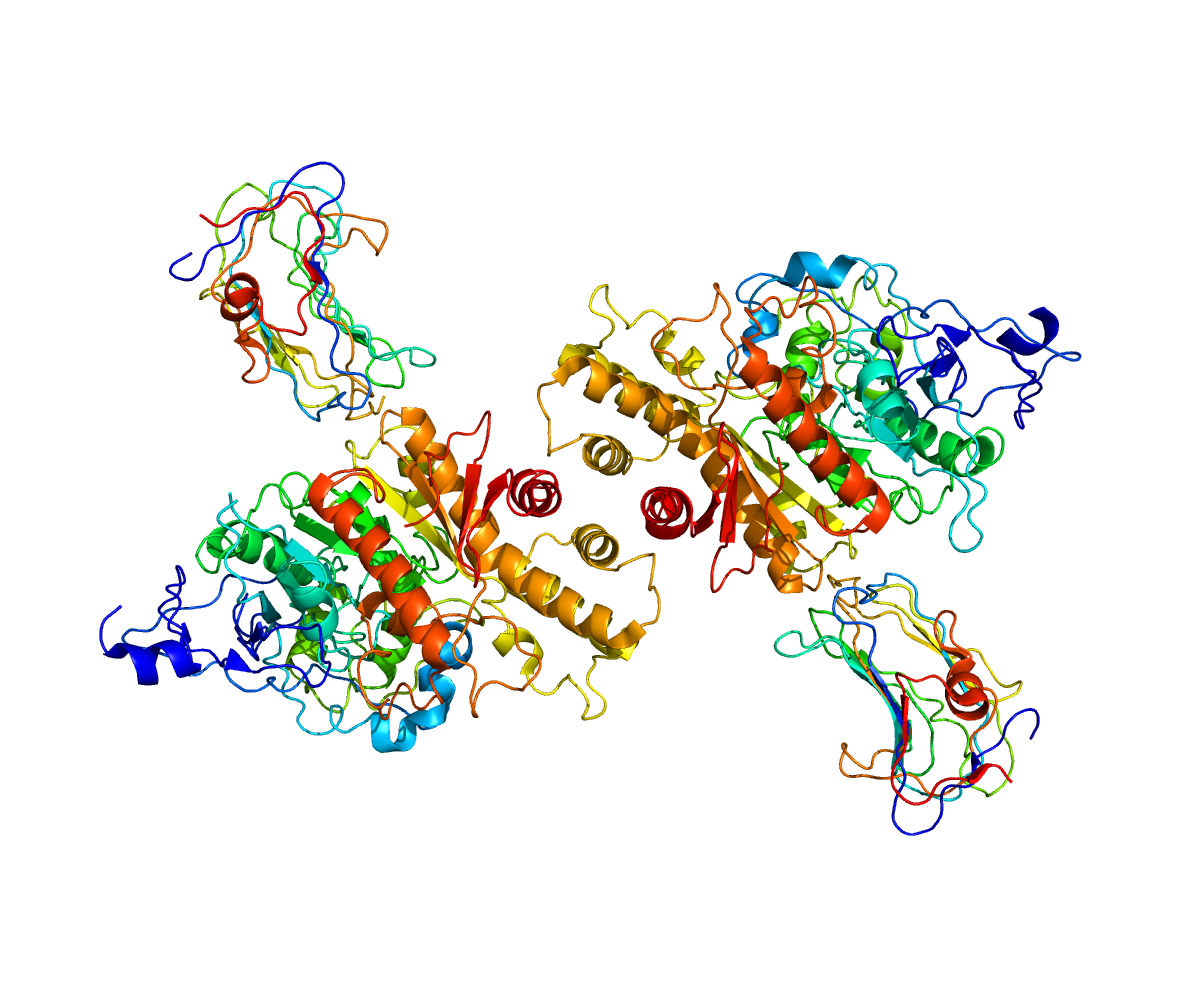

Identifiers
- Aliases: NLGN4X, ASPGX2, AUTSX2, HLNX, HNL4X, NLGN4, neuroligin 4, X-linked, neuroligin 4 X-linked
- External IDs: OMIM: 300427; GeneCards: NLGN4X
Available structures
| PDB | Human UniProt search: PDBe RCSB |
| PDB | List of PDB id codes 2WQZ, 2XB6, 3BE8 |

Gene location (Human)
| Chr. | X chromosome (human) |
| Band | Xp22.32-p22.31 | Start | 5,840,637 bp |
| Band | Xp22.32-p22.31 | End | 6,228,867 bp |
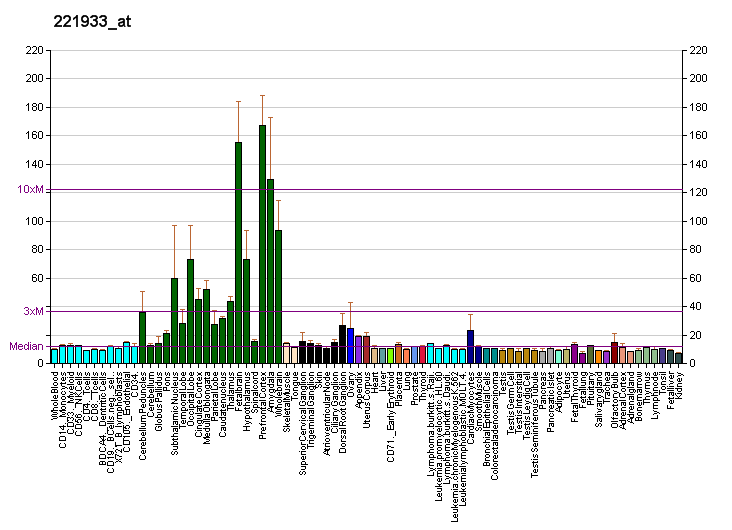
RNA expression pattern
| Bgee | Human / Mouse (ortholog); Top expressed in: middle temporal gyrus; Brodmann area 23; spinal ganglia; cerebellar vermis; entorhinal cortex; ventricular zone; secondary oocyte; decidua; Brodmann area 46; buccal mucosa cell / n/a; More reference expression data |
| BioGPS | More reference expression data |
Gene ontology
| Molecular function | protein homodimerization activity; scaffold protein binding; carboxylic ester hydrolase activity; neurexin family protein binding; protein binding; chloride ion binding; cell adhesion molecule binding; signaling receptor activity |
| Cellular component | integral component of membrane; postsynaptic membrane; membrane; postsynaptic density; synapse; integral component of plasma membrane; excitatory synapse; cell surface; cell junction; dendrite; plasma membrane; intracellular anatomical structure; spanning component of membrane; presynapse; symmetric, GABA-ergic, inhibitory synapse; asymmetric, glutamatergic, excitatory synapse |
| Biological process | cell-cell junction organization; organ growth; neuron cell-cell adhesion; brainstem development; synapse organization; learning; cerebellum development; negative regulation of excitatory postsynaptic potential; presynaptic membrane assembly; vocalization behavior; adult behavior; cell adhesion; neuron differentiation; social behavior; synaptic vesicle endocytosis; postsynaptic membrane assembly; modulation of chemical synaptic transmission; presynapse assembly |
Sources:Amigo / QuickGO
Orthologs
| Databases | NCBI: entry; OMA: entry |
| Species | Human | Mouse |
| Entrez | 57502 | n/a |
| Ensembl | ENSG00000146938 | n/a |
| UniProt | Q8N0W4 | n/a |
| RefSeq (mRNA) | NM_001282145; NM_001282146; NM_020742; NM_181332 | n/a |
| RefSeq (protein) | NP_001269074; NP_001269075; NP_065793; NP_851849 | n/a |
| Location (UCSC) | Chr X: 5.84 – 6.23 Mb | n/a |
| PubMed search | | n/a |
- Wikidata
| View/Edit Human |

Neuroligin-4, X-linked is a protein that in humans is encoded by the NLGN4X gene (previously NLGN4).

In the human brain, the synaptic protein NLGN4 is primarily expressed in the cerebral cortex.

This gene encodes a member of the neuroligin family of neuronal cell surface proteins. Neuroligins may act as splice site-specific ligands for beta-neurexins and may be involved in the formation and remodeling of central nervous system synapses. The encoded protein interacts with discs, large (Drosophila) homolog 4 (DLG4). Mutations in this gene have been associated with autism and Asperger syndrome. Two transcript variants encoding the same protein have been identified for this gene.
