= NLGN3 =

Protein-coding gene in the species Homo sapiens

Identifiers
- Aliases: NLGN3, HNL3, neuroligin 3
- External IDs: OMIM: 300336; MGI: 2444609; GeneCards: NLGN3

Gene location (Human)
Chr.	X chromosome (human)
Band	Xq13.1	Start	71,144,821 bp
Band	Xq13.1	End	71,175,255 bp

Gene location (Mouse)
Chr.	X chromosome (mouse)
Band	X|X D	Start	100,342,774 bp
Band	X|X D	End	100,369,569 bp
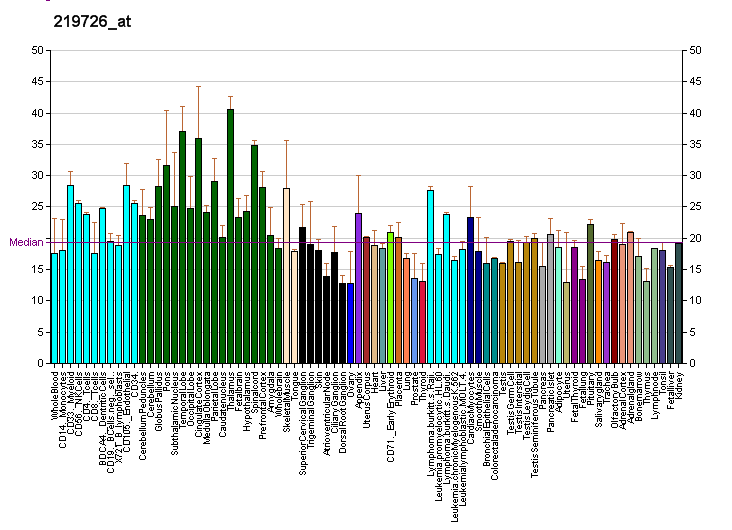
RNA expression pattern
Bgee	Human / Mouse (ortholog); Top expressed in: ventricular zone; prefrontal cortex; amygdala; right frontal lobe; ganglionic eminence; cingulate gyrus; anterior cingulate cortex; nucleus accumbens; caudate nucleus; Brodmann area 9 / Top expressed in: dentate gyrus of hippocampal formation granule cell; visual cortex; primary visual cortex; superior frontal gyrus; supraoptic nucleus; substantia nigra; Region I of hippocampus proper; hippocampus proper; Rostral migratory stream; neural tube; More reference expression data
BioGPS	More reference expression data
Gene ontology
Molecular function	scaffold protein binding; neurexin family protein binding; carboxylic ester hydrolase activity; cell adhesion molecule binding; protein binding; signaling receptor activity
Cellular component	integral component of membrane; membrane; cell surface; synapse; cell junction; endocytic vesicle; excitatory synapse; plasma membrane; integral component of plasma membrane; integral component of postsynaptic membrane; spanning component of membrane; presynapse; symmetric, GABA-ergic, inhibitory synapse; asymmetric, glutamatergic, excitatory synapse
Biological process	regulation of AMPA receptor activity; positive regulation of synaptic vesicle clustering; social behavior; rhythmic synaptic transmission; regulation of NMDA receptor activity; regulation of synaptic transmission, glutamatergic; excitatory postsynaptic potential; positive regulation of AMPA receptor activity; synapse organization; negative regulation of excitatory postsynaptic potential; modulation of chemical synaptic transmission; regulation of respiratory gaseous exchange by nervous system process; axon extension; learning; long-term potentiation; vocalization behavior; negative regulation of dendritic spine morphogenesis; neuron cell-cell adhesion; regulation of dendritic spine morphogenesis; receptor-mediated endocytosis; cell adhesion; oligodendrocyte differentiation; regulation of terminal button organization; adult behavior; positive regulation of excitatory postsynaptic potential; positive regulation of synaptic transmission, glutamatergic; regulation of long-term synaptic potentiation; visual learning; inhibitory postsynaptic potential; positive regulation of synapse assembly; synapse assembly; synaptic vesicle endocytosis; postsynaptic membrane assembly; presynaptic membrane assembly; presynapse assembly
Sources:Amigo / QuickGO
Orthologs
Databases	NCBI: entry; OMA: entry
Species	Human	Mouse
Entrez	54413	245537
Ensembl	ENSG00000196338	ENSMUSG00000031302
UniProt	Q9NZ94	Q8BYM5
RefSeq (mRNA)	NM_001166660; NM_018977; NM_181303; NM_001321276	NM_172932
RefSeq (protein)	NP_001160132; NP_001308205; NP_061850; NP_851820; NP_001160132.1	NP_766520
Location (UCSC)	Chr X: 71.14 – 71.18 Mb	Chr X: 100.34 – 100.37 Mb
PubMed search
- Wikidata
View/Edit Human	View/Edit Mouse

Neuroligin-3 is a protein that in humans is encoded by the NLGN3 gene.

This gene encodes a member of the neuroligin family of neuronal cell surface proteins. Neuroligins may act as splice site-specific ligands for beta-neurexins and may be involved in the formation and remodeling of central nervous system synapses. Mutations in this gene may be associated with autism spectrum disorders (ASDs). Multiple transcript variants encoding distinct isoforms have been identified for this gene, but their full length sequences have not been determined.
