= Neuroligin =

Protein

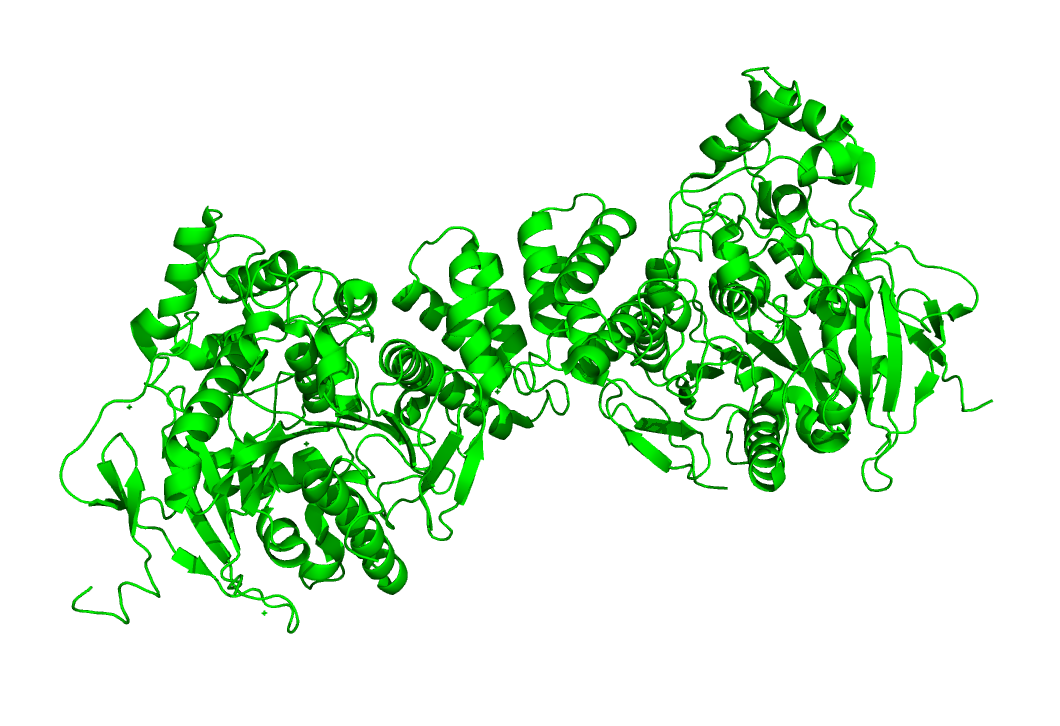
- Tertiary structure of Neuroligin 4.

Identifiers
- Symbol: Neuroligin
- InterPro: IPR000460
- Membranome: 72
Available protein structures:
- PDB: IPR000460
- AlphaFold: IPR000460

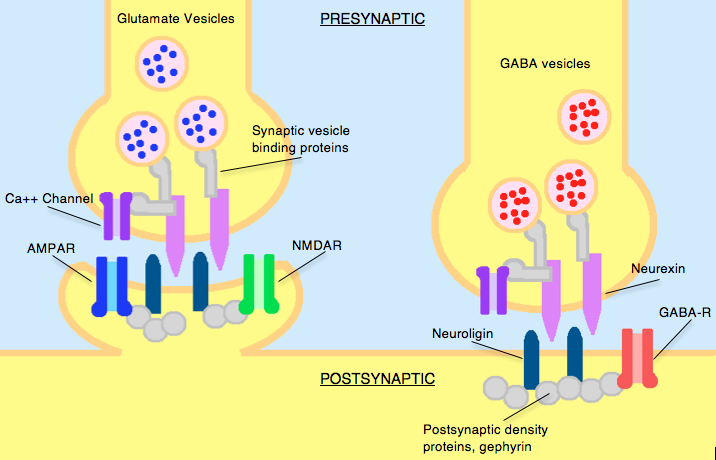
Neurolign and neurexin "handshake"

neuroligin 1

Identifiers
- Symbol: NLGN1
- NCBI gene: 22871
- HGNC: 14291
- OMIM: 600568
- RefSeq: NP_055747
- UniProt: Q8N2Q7

Other data
- Locus: Chr. 3 q26.31
Search for
- Structures: Swiss-model
- Domains: InterPro

neuroligin 2

Identifiers
- Symbol: NLGN2
- NCBI gene: 57555
- HGNC: 14290
- OMIM: 606479
- RefSeq: NP_065846
- UniProt: Q8NFZ4

Other data
- Locus: Chr. 17 p13.1
Search for
- Structures: Swiss-model
- Domains: InterPro

neuroligin 3

Identifiers
- Symbol: NLGN3
- NCBI gene: 54413
- HGNC: 14289
- OMIM: 300336
- RefSeq: NP_001160132
- UniProt: Q9NZ94

Other data
- Locus: Chr. X q13.1
Search for
- Structures: Swiss-model
- Domains: InterPro

neuroligin 4X

Identifiers
- Symbol: NLGN4X
- NCBI gene: 57502
- HGNC: 14287
- OMIM: 300427
- RefSeq: NP_065793
- UniProt: Q8N0W4

Other data
- Locus: Chr. X p22.32-22.31
Search for
- Structures: Swiss-model
- Domains: InterPro

neuroligin 4Y

Identifiers
- Symbol: NLGN4Y
- NCBI gene: 22829
- HGNC: 15529
- OMIM: 400028
- RefSeq: NM_014893
- UniProt: Q8NFZ3

Other data
- Locus: Chr. Y q11.221
Search for
- Structures: Swiss-model
- Domains: InterPro

Neuroligin (NLGN), a type I membrane protein, is a cell adhesion protein on the postsynaptic membrane that mediates the formation and maintenance of synapses between neurons. Neuroligins act as ligands for β-neurexins, which are cell adhesion proteins located presynaptically. Neuroligin and β-neurexin "shake hands", resulting in the connection between two neurons and the production of a synapse. Neuroligins also affect the properties of neural networks by specifying synaptic functions, and they mediate signalling by recruiting and stabilizing key synaptic components. Neuroligins interact with other postsynaptic proteins to localize neurotransmitter receptors and channels in the postsynaptic density as the cell matures. Additionally, neuroligins are expressed in human peripheral tissues and have been found to play a role in angiogenesis. In humans, alterations in genes encoding neuroligins are implicated in autism and other cognitive disorders. Antibodies in a mother from previous male pregnancies against neuroligin 4 from the Y chromosome increase the probability of homosexuality in male offspring.

== Structure ==
Neuroligins bind with the aid of Ca^{2+} to the α-neurexin LNS (laminin, neurexin and sex hormone-binding globulin-like folding units) domains and to the β-neurexin LNS domain which then establishes a heterophilic trans-synaptic recognition code. Through the observation of the crystal structure of neuroligin-1, it was determined that neuroligin-1 forms a protein dimer when two neurexin-1 beta monomers bind to the neuroligin-1's two opposite surfaces. This forms a heterotetramer, which contains an interface for binding Ca^{2+}. The interaction of neuroligin and neurexin to form a heterotetramer is monitored by alternatively spliced sites located near the binding interface for Ca^{2+} in both the neuroligin-1 and the neurexin-1 beta. Subsequently, the presence of native neuroligin dimers was confirmed in neurons through biochemical detection, which included heterodimers composed of different neuroligin species, increasing the potential heterogeneity of endogenous neuroligin core dimer complexes.

The extracellular domain of NLGN consists mostly of a region that is homologous to acetylcholinesterases, but the amino acids important for catalysis in AChE are not conserved in NLGN, which lack esterase activity. Furthermore, this AChE homologous region is crucial for the proper function of NLGN.

== Genetics ==
Neuroligins have been identified in both vertebrates and invertebrates, including humans, rodents, chickens, Drosophila melanogaster, Caenorhabditis elegans, honeybees and Aplysia. Three genes for neuroligin expression have been found in mice and rats, while humans express five genes. Drosophila express four genes, honeybees express five genes, and both C. elegans and Aplysia express a single gene for neuroligin.

The known neuroligin genes in Homo sapiens include NLGN1, NLGN2, NLGN3, NLGN4X and NLGN4Y. Each gene has been found to have unique influences on synaptic transmission.

=== Expression ===
Expression of neuroligins may differ between species. Neuroligin 1 is expressed specifically in the CNS at excitatory synapses. In humans, expression of neuroligin 1 is low before birth and increases between postnatal days 1-8 and remains high through adulthood. This postnatal increase during active synaptogenesis corresponds to increased expression of postsynaptic density protein-95 (PSD-95). Neuroligin 2 is mainly concentrated at inhibitory synapses in the CNS, but in mice and humans it may also be expressed in tissues such as the pancreas, lung, endothelia, uterus and colon. Neuroligin 3 is expressed in CNS neurons, as well as a variety of glial cells in mice and rats and the brain, heart, skeletal muscle, placenta and pancreas in humans. Neuroligin 4X is expressed in the heart, liver, skeletal muscle, pancreas and low levels in the brain. Neuroligin 5 (or 4Y), located on the Y chromosome, is only 19 amino acids different from neuroligin 4X. Neuroligin mRNA are present in human endothelial cells from large blood vessels and in Dorsal Root Ganglions.

=== Alternative splicing ===
Alternative splicing, a modification that occurs after transcription of mRNA, regulates neuroligins' binding selectivity for α- or β-neurexins as well as the function of synapses. Alternative splicing in neuroligins occurs in the main functional domain, the acetylcholinesterase-homologous region. Because neuroligin has two conserved splice sites in this region, sites A and B, up to four different isoforms are possible for each neuroligin gene. Neurexins also undergo alternative splicing, and certain splice variants of neuroligins and neurexins are more selective for one another. Specific pairing of splice variants also affects synaptic function. For example, neuroligins lacking the B splice insert and β-neurexins with the S4 insert promote differentiation of inhibitory, GABAergic synapses. On the other hand, neuroligins with the B insert and β-neurexins lacking the S4 insert promote differentiation of excitatory, glutamatergic synapses. The A insert may promote neuroligin localization and function at inhibitory synapses, but the mechanisms are unknown.

== Activity with neurexin ==
Neurexin and neuroligin work together to gather and maintain the cytoskeleton components needed to localize synaptic vesicles. Neurexin is necessary for containing the voltage-gated Ca^{2+} channels that are required for the release of vesicles, while neuroligin binds neurexin in order to localize the necessary neurotransmitter receptors and proteins for postsynaptic specialization. At the postsynaptic site, neuroligins are networked to specialized proteins that stimulate specific neurotransmitter receptors and channels to densely occupy specialized regions of the postsynaptic terminal during the maturation of the synapse. Because all developing synapses contain neurexins and neuroligins, developing cells can make many different connections to other cells.

== Synapse formation ==
Neuroligin is sufficient to form new functional presynaptic terminals in vitro. However, evidence suggests that additional adhesion molecules, such as immunoglobulin-domain and cadherin family proteins, mediate the initial contact between the axons and dendrites for a synapse. Neurexins and neuroligins then reinforce the contact.

In addition to the selectivity of splice variants, the levels of neuroligins, neurexins, and other interacting proteins present on the pre- and postsynaptic membranes influence the differentiation and balance of synapses. As synapses form during synaptogenesis, they differentiate into one of two categories: excitatory or inhibitory. Excitatory synapses increase probability of firing an action potential in the postsynaptic neuron and are often glutamatergic, or synapses in which the neurotransmitter glutamate is released. Inhibitory synapses decrease probability of firing an action potential in the postsynaptic neuron and are often GABAergic, in which the neurotransmitter GABA is released. Especially during early development, neurons must receive an appropriate balance of excitatory vs. inhibitory synaptic input, referred to as the E/I ratio. In fact, an imbalance in the E/I ratio is thought to be involved in autistic spectrum disorders.

Neuroligin 1 localizes at excitatory synapses, neuroligin 2 at inhibitory synapses and neuroligin 3 at both. Reduction in the levels of neuroligins 1, 2 and 3 results in a strong reduction of inhibitory input but little reduction in excitatory input. In addition, neuroligins interact with PSD-95, an intracellular protein that anchors synaptic proteins in the post-synaptic density of excitatory synapses, and gephyrin, the respective scaffolding protein of the post-synaptic membrane in inhibitory synapses. Neuroligin 2 and 4 specifically interact with collybistin a protein that regulates the localization of gephyrin. The level of PSD-95 appears to influence the balance of excitatory and inhibitory inputs. An increase in the ratio of PSD-95 to neuroligin resulted in an increase in the E/I ratio, and a decrease in the PSD-95/neuroligin ratio had the opposite effect. Also, overexpression of PSD-95 redirects neuroligin-2 from excitatory to inhibitory synapses, strengthening excitatory input and reducing inhibitory input. These interactions of neuroligin, neurexin and interacting proteins such as PSD-95 point to a potential regulatory mechanism that controls development and balance of excitatory and inhibitory synapses, governed by homeostatic feedback mechanisms.

== Clinical significance ==
Neuroligin dysfunction has been implicated in autism spectrum disorders (ASD). Different genetic alterations have been detected in neuroligin genes in patients with ASD, including point mutations, missense mutations and internal deletions. In studies done on family members with X-linked autism, specific mutations of NLGN3 and NLGN4 have been identified. These mutations have been shown to affect how neuroligins function and have been shown to interfere with synaptic transmission. 19 of the 69 known proteins mutated in X-linked autism encode postsynaptic proteins, neuroligins included.

Additionally, maternal antibodies against Y-chromosome neuroligin NLGN4Y have been implicated in the fetal development of male homosexuality.

=== NLGN3 mutations ===
A mutated NLGN3 gene, R451C, has been cloned. The mutant has been shown to cause defective neuroligin trafficking and retention of the mutant protein in the endoplasmic reticulum. The small amount of mutant protein that reached the cell membrane demonstrated diminished binding activity for neurexin-1, consistent with a loss of function. The mutant gene has been cloned and was introduced into mice, resulting in impaired social interactions, enhanced spatial learning abilities and increased inhibitory synaptic transmission. Deleting NLGN3 did not produce these effects, thus indicating R451C to be a gain-of-function mutation. This supports the claim that increased inhibitory synaptic transmission may contribute to human autism spectrum disorders.

=== NLGN4 mutations ===
Mutations in NLGN4 have also been found in persons with X-linked autism. A frame shift mutation 1186T has been found to cause an early stop codon and premature protein truncation. This mutation results in intracellular retention of mutant proteins, possibly causing impaired function of a synaptic cell adhesion molecule, and modifying the binding of the neuroligin protein to its presynaptic partners, neurexins, thus interrupting essential synaptic function. Other mutations of NLGN4 found in relation to autism spectrum disorders include a 2-bp deletion, 1253delAG, in the NLGN4 gene, which causes a frameshift and a premature stop codon. Another mutation is a hemizygous deletion in the NLGN4 gene encompassing exons 4, 5 and 6. The 757-kb deletion was predicted to result in a significantly truncated protein.

== See also ==
- Fraternal birth order and male sexual orientation
- Neurexin
- Synaptogenesis
- Postsynaptic density
