= Biochemical detection =

Biochemical detection is the science and technology of detecting biochemicals and their concentration where trace analysis is concerned this is usually done by using a quartz crystal microbalance, which measures a mass per unit area by measuring the change in frequency of a quartz crystal resonator. Another method is with nanoparticles.

== History ==
The roots of biochemical detection trace back to the early 20th century with the development of colorimetric assays to study enzymatic reactions. Over time, the field evolved with the introduction of immunological techniques such as ELISA in the 1970s, followed by molecular biology advancements like PCR in the 1980s. The 21st century saw a surge in the miniaturization of diagnostic devices, ushering in portable and wearable biosensors that allow for decentralized, point-of-care testing.

== Methods ==
Biochemical detection techniques are generally categorized into enzymatic, immunological, and molecular methods. Traditional examples include:

- Enzyme-linked immunosorbent assay (ELISA) – detects antigens or antibodies using enzyme-labeled reagents.
- Spectrophotometry – measures light absorption of reaction products.
- Colorimetric assays – change color in response to target substances (e.g., glucose detection).
- Polymerase chain reaction (PCR) – amplifies DNA for pathogen identification.
- Electrochemical sensing — Measures electrical signals generated by biochemical interactions.
- Lateral flow tests — Rapid, paper-based tests that are widely used in field diagnostics (e.g., pregnancy tests, COVID-19 antigen tests).

== Applications ==
Medical Diagnostics

In clinical settings, biochemical detection is fundamental for identifying infections, monitoring metabolic disorders, and guiding treatment decisions. Blood glucose meters for diabetes, troponin tests for myocardial infarction, and nucleic acid amplification tests (NAATs) for infectious diseases are all examples of biochemical diagnostics.

Food Safety and Public Health

Biochemical detection plays a key role in ensuring the microbiological safety of food. The U.S. Department of Agriculture's Agricultural Research Service (ARS) has developed rapid enzyme-based and molecular methods to identify bacterial and viral pathogens in aquaculture products. These include RT-PCR and ELISA-based assays for organisms such as Vibrio and Norovirus. The ARS also evaluates post-detection interventions like high-pressure processing to neutralize pathogens, enhancing overall food safety strategies.

Environmental Monitoring

Biochemical sensors are widely used in detecting pollutants, toxins, or pathogens in soil and water samples. They help monitor environmental hazards such as heavy metals, pesticides, and microbial contamination. Biosensors using microbial or enzymatic elements offer high specificity for targeted contaminants.

Portable and Wearable Devices

Recent advancements in micro-fabrication and flexible electronics have led to the development of portable and wearable biochemical sensing systems. These devices enable real-time, non-invasive monitoring of bio fluids (e.g., sweat, saliva) and are increasingly integrated with smartphones for point-of-care diagnostics. Techniques such as electrochemical sensing, fluorescence-based assays, and microfluidics are at the core of these innovations.

== Advantages and limitations ==
Advantages:

- High specificity and sensitivity
- Rapid results in many cases
- Minimal sample preparation required
- Field-deployable in portable formats

Limitations:

- May require cold storage or complex reagents
- Interference from other substances (false positives/negatives)
- Costs can vary based on assay type and technology

== Future direction ==
Ongoing research aims to increase the sensitivity, specificity, and portability of biochemical detection systems. Integration with artificial intelligence, nanotechnology, and lab-on-a-chip platforms is expected to expand their use in remote healthcare, environmental surveillance, and biosecurity.

== Bibliography ==
- Stevens, Molly. Detection of Disease Related Enzymes by Peptide Functionalised Nanoparticles (Thesis / Dissertation ETD). John Alexander Gordon. Imperial College London. OCLC 801212963.
- Laromaine, A.; Koh, L.; Murugesan, M.; Ulijn, R. V.; Stevens, M. M. (2007). "Protease-Triggered Dispersion of Nanoparticle Assemblies". Journal of the American Chemical Society. 129 (14): 4156–4157. Bibcode:2007JAChS.129.4156L. doi:10.1021/ja0706504. PMID 17358069.
- Maher, R. C.; Maier, S. A.; Cohen, L. F.; Koh, L.; Laromaine, A.; Dick, J. A. G.; Stevens, M. M. (2010). "Exploiting SERS Hot Spots for Disease-Specific Enzyme Detection†". The Journal of Physical Chemistry C. 114 (16): 7231. doi:10.1021/jp905493u.
- Food Safety National Program, & United States. Agricultural Research Service. (2006). Molecular & biochemical detection & intervention methods for bacterial and viral pathogens in aquaculture products: 2006 annual report. U.S. Dept. of Agriculture, Agricultural Research Service.
- Liu, Q. (Ed.). (2024). Portable and Wearable Sensing Systems: Techniques, Fabrication, and Biochemical Detection. Wiley-VCH. http://doi.org/10.1002/9783527841080
