= Carboxylesterase 1 =

Protein-coding gene in the species Homo sapiens

CES1
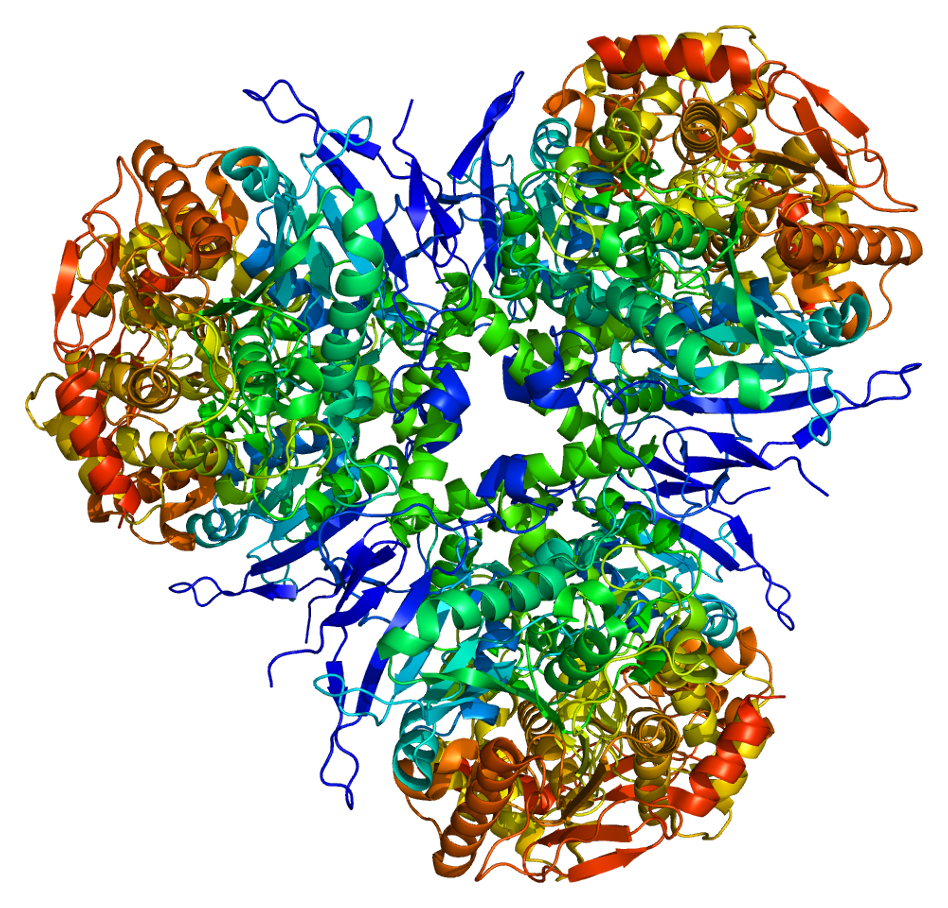

Identifiers
- Aliases: CES1, ACAT, CE-1, CEH, CES2, HMSE, HMSE1, PCE-1, REH, SES1, TGH, hCE-1, carboxylesterase 1
- External IDs: OMIM: 114835; MGI: 2148202; GeneCards: CES1
Available structures
PDB	Ortholog search: PDBe RCSB
PDB	List of PDB id codes 1MX1, 1MX5, 1MX9, 1YA4, 1YA8, 1YAH, 1YAJ, 2DQY, 2DQZ, 2DR0, 2H7C, 2HRQ, 2HRR, 3K9B, 4AB1, 5A7F, 5A7H, 5A7G
Enzyme activity
EC #	BRENDA	ExPASy	KEGG	MetaCyc
3.1.1.1	↗	↗	↗	↗
3.1.1.13	↗	↗	↗	↗
3.1.1.56	↗	↗	↗	↗

Gene location (Human)
Chr.	Chromosome 16 (human)
Band	16q12.2	Start	55,802,851 bp
Band	16q12.2	End	55,833,337 bp

Gene location (Mouse)
Chr.	Chromosome 8 (mouse)
Band	8|8 C5	Start	93,892,696 bp
Band	8|8 C5	End	93,924,466 bp
RNA expression pattern
Bgee	Human / Mouse (ortholog); Top expressed in: right lobe of liver; gallbladder; right lung; olfactory zone of nasal mucosa; upper lobe of left lung; smooth muscle tissue; apex of heart; muscle layer of sigmoid colon; Descending thoracic aorta; epithelium of colon / Top expressed in: white adipose tissue; lacrimal gland; gallbladder; right lung lobe; nasal epithelium; tunica adventitia of aorta; olfactory epithelium; superior surface of tongue; brown adipose tissue; left lung; More reference expression data
BioGPS	n/a
Gene ontology
Molecular function	methylumbelliferyl-acetate deacetylase activity; carboxylic ester hydrolase activity; hydrolase activity; sterol esterase activity; triglyceride lipase activity; methyl indole-3-acetate esterase activity
Cellular component	endoplasmic reticulum lumen; cytosol; endoplasmic reticulum; extracellular space
Biological process	xenobiotic metabolic process; epithelial cell differentiation; response to toxic substance; cholesterol ester hydrolysis involved in cholesterol transport; cholesterol biosynthetic process; medium-chain fatty acid metabolic process; lipid catabolic process; angiotensin maturation
Sources:Amigo / QuickGO
Orthologs
Databases	NCBI: entry; OMA: entry
Species	Human	Mouse
Entrez	1066	104158
Ensembl	ENSG00000198848; ENSG00000262243	ENSMUSG00000056973
UniProt	P23141	Q8VCT4
RefSeq (mRNA)	NM_001025194; NM_001025195; NM_001266	NM_053200
RefSeq (protein)	NP_001020365; NP_001020366; NP_001257	NP_444430
Location (UCSC)	Chr 16: 55.8 – 55.83 Mb	Chr 8: 93.89 – 93.92 Mb
PubMed search
- Wikidata
View/Edit Human	View/Edit Mouse

Liver carboxylesterase 1 also known as carboxylesterase 1 (CES1, hCE-1 or CES1A1) is an enzyme that in humans is encoded by the CES1 gene. The protein is also historically known as serine esterase 1 (SES1), monocyte esterase and cholesterol ester hydrolase (CEH). Three transcript variants encoding three different isoforms have been found for this gene. The various protein products from isoform a, b and c range in size from 568, 567 and 566 amino acids long, respectively.

CES1 is present in most tissues with higher levels in the liver and low levels in the gastrointestinal tract.

== Function ==
Carboxylesterase 1 is a serine esterase and member of a large multigene carboxylesterase family. It is also part of the alpha/beta fold hydrolase family. These enzymes are responsible for the hydrolysis of ester- and amide-bond-containing xenobiotics and drugs such as cocaine and heroin. They also hydrolyze long-chain fatty acid esters and thioesters. As part of phase II metabolism, the resulting carboxylates are then often conjugated by other enzymes to increase solubility and eventually excreted.

This enzyme is known to hydrolyze aromatic and aliphatic esters and can manage cellular cholesterol esterification levels. It may also play a role in detoxification in the lung and/or protection of the central nervous system from ester or amide compounds.

The protein contains an amino acid sequence at its N-terminus that sends it into the endoplasmic reticulum where a C-terminal sequence can bind to a KDEL receptor.

== Clinical significance ==
Carboxylesterase 1 deficiency may be associated with non-Hodgkin lymphoma or B-cell lymphocytic leukemia. Inhibition of CES1 by in particular organophosphates reduces tumor-killing activity by monocytes. The loss of this protein in monocytes is one product of organophosphate poisoning.

CES1 can activate or deactivate various drugs. CES1 is responsible for the activation of many prodrugs such as angiotensin-converting enzyme (ACE) inhibitors, oseltamivir, and dabigatran. Genetic variants of CES1 can significantly affect both pharmacokinetics and pharmacodynamics of drugs metabolized by CES1, such as methylphenidate and clopidogrel. The ability of CES1 to metabolize heroin and cocaine among other drugs has suggested a therapeutic role for the enzyme.

== Interactive pathway map ==
Click on genes, proteins and metabolites below to link to respective articles. (Note: The interactive pathway map can be edited at WikiPathways: "FluoropyrimidineActivity_WP1601".)
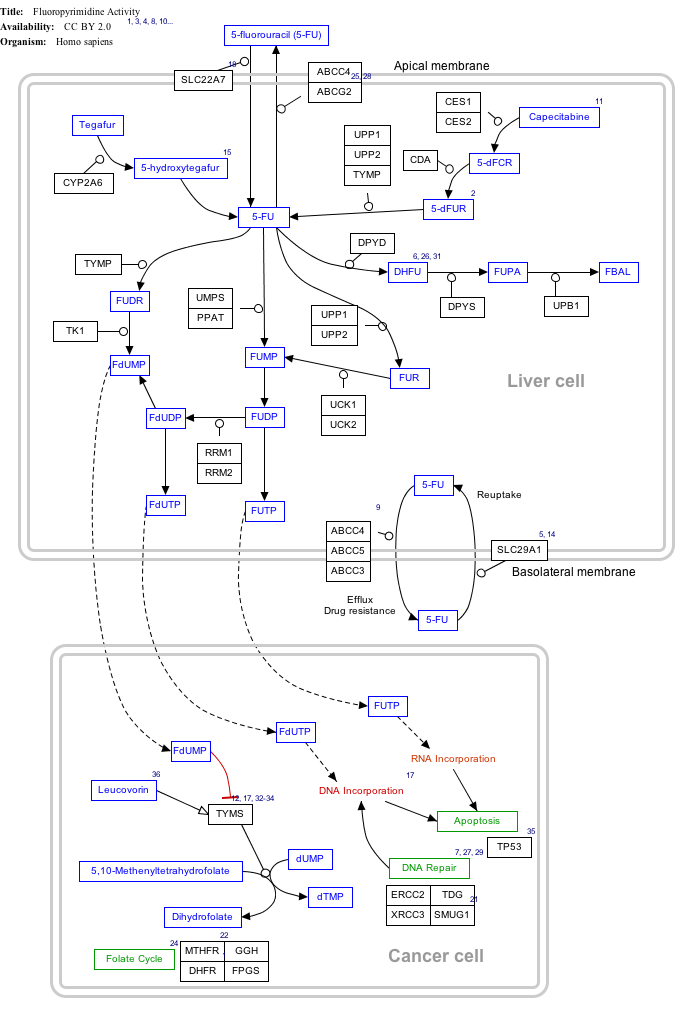

Fluorouracil (5-FU) Activity edit
Click on genes, proteins and metabolites below to link to respective articles. (Note: The interactive pathway map can be edited at WikiPathways: "IrinotecanPathway_WP229".)
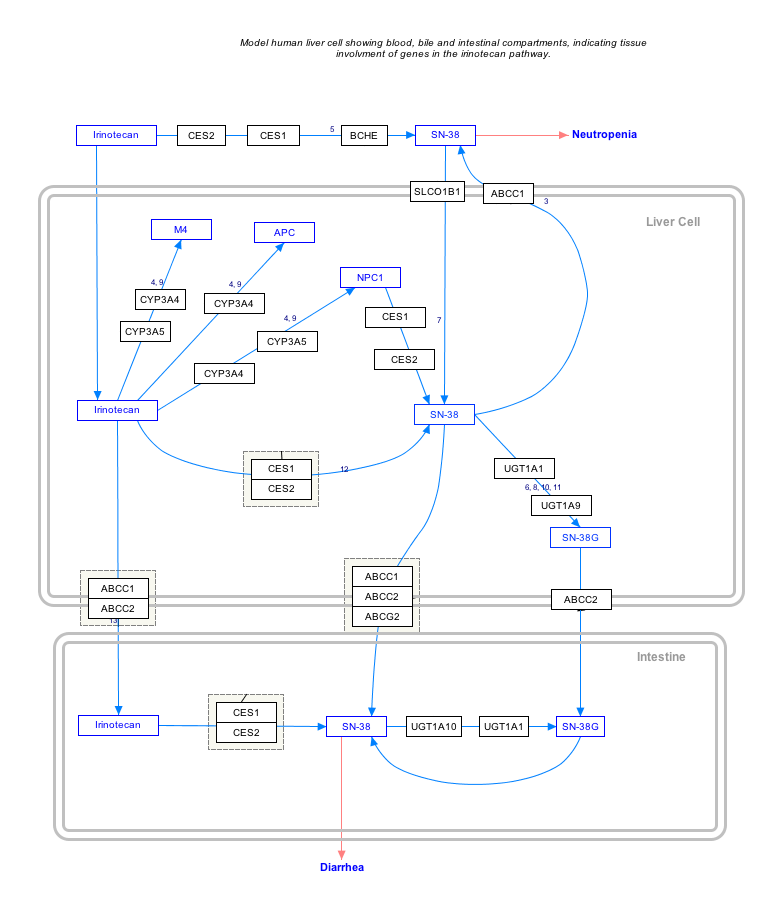

Irinotecan Pathway edit
