= NLGN2 =

Protein-coding gene in the species Homo sapiens

Identifiers
- Aliases: NLGN2, neuroligin 2
- External IDs: OMIM: 606479; MGI: 2681835; GeneCards: NLGN2
Available structures
PDB	Ortholog search: PDBe RCSB
PDB	List of PDB id codes 3BL8

Gene location (Human)
Chr.	Chromosome 17 (human)
Band	17p13.1	Start	7,404,874 bp
Band	17p13.1	End	7,419,860 bp

Gene location (Mouse)
Chr.	Chromosome 11 (mouse)
Band	11|11 B3	Start	69,713,948 bp
Band	11|11 B3	End	69,728,610 bp
RNA expression pattern
Bgee	Human / Mouse (ortholog); Top expressed in: right hemisphere of cerebellum; superior frontal gyrus; right ovary; primary visual cortex; ganglionic eminence; body of uterus; right frontal lobe; stromal cell of endometrium; left ovary; nucleus accumbens / Top expressed in: subiculum; dorsomedial hypothalamic nucleus; piriform cortex; superior colliculus; anterior amygdaloid area; primary visual cortex; internal carotid artery; superior frontal gyrus; cerebellar cortex; cerebellar vermis; More reference expression data
BioGPS	n/a
Gene ontology
Molecular function	carboxylic ester hydrolase activity; neurexin family protein binding; cell adhesion molecule binding; signaling receptor activity; identical protein binding
Cellular component	integral component of membrane; postsynaptic membrane; membrane; synapse; inhibitory synapse; cell surface; cell junction; presynaptic membrane; plasma membrane; integral component of plasma membrane; integral component of postsynaptic membrane; intracellular anatomical structure; spanning component of membrane; glycinergic synapse; dopaminergic synapse; GABA-ergic synapse; symmetric, GABA-ergic, inhibitory synapse; integral component of postsynaptic specialization membrane
Biological process	neuromuscular process controlling balance; neuron cell-cell adhesion; positive regulation of inhibitory postsynaptic potential; synapse organization; modulation of chemical synaptic transmission; positive regulation of protein localization to synapse; gephyrin clustering involved in postsynaptic density assembly; postsynaptic density protein 95 clustering; positive regulation of synaptic transmission, GABAergic; regulation of AMPA receptor activity; locomotory exploration behavior; regulation of respiratory gaseous exchange by nervous system process; cell-cell junction maintenance; positive regulation of synaptic vesicle clustering; positive regulation of synaptic transmission, glutamatergic; cell adhesion; positive regulation of excitatory postsynaptic potential; sensory perception of pain; terminal button organization; protein localization to synapse; positive regulation of insulin secretion; positive regulation of synapse assembly; inhibitory synapse assembly; synapse assembly; synaptic vesicle endocytosis; postsynaptic membrane assembly; presynaptic membrane assembly; cell-cell adhesion; postsynaptic specialization assembly; presynapse assembly
Sources:Amigo / QuickGO
Orthologs
Databases	NCBI: entry; OMA: entry
Species	Human	Mouse
Entrez	57555	216856
Ensembl	ENSG00000169992; ENSG00000283859	ENSMUSG00000051790
UniProt	Q8NFZ4	Q69ZK9
RefSeq (mRNA)	NM_020795	NM_198862; NM_001364137
RefSeq (protein)	NP_065846	NP_942562; NP_001351066
Location (UCSC)	Chr 17: 7.4 – 7.42 Mb	Chr 11: 69.71 – 69.73 Mb
PubMed search
- Wikidata
View/Edit Human	View/Edit Mouse

Neuroligin-2 is a protein that in humans is encoded by the NLGN2 gene.

This gene encodes a member of a family of neuronal cell surface proteins. Members of this family may act as splice site-specific ligands for beta-neurexins and may be involved in the formation and remodeling of central nervous system synapses.
