= Carboxylesterase 2 =

Enzyme hydrolysing long-chain fatty esters

CES2

Identifiers
- Aliases: CES2, CE-2, CES2A1, PCE-2, iCE, Carboxylesterase 2, CES-2
- External IDs: OMIM: 605278; MGI: 3648740; GeneCards: CES2
Enzyme activity
| EC # | BRENDA | ExPASy | KEGG | MetaCyc |
|---|---|---|---|---|
| 3.1.1.1 | ↗ | ↗ | ↗ | ↗ |
| 3.1.1.56 | ↗ | ↗ | ↗ | ↗ |
| 3.1.1.84 | ↗ | ↗ | ↗ | ↗ |

Gene location (Human)
| Chr. | Chromosome 16 (human) |
| Band | 16q22.1 | Start | 66,934,444 bp |
| Band | 16q22.1 | End | 66,945,096 bp |

Gene location (Mouse)
| Chr. | Chromosome 8 (mouse) |
| Band | 8|8 D3 | Start | 105,727,485 bp |
| Band | 8|8 D3 | End | 105,747,810 bp |
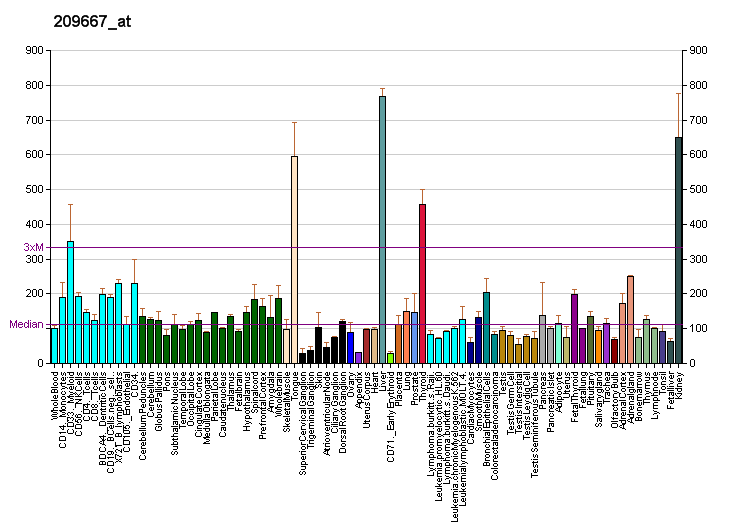

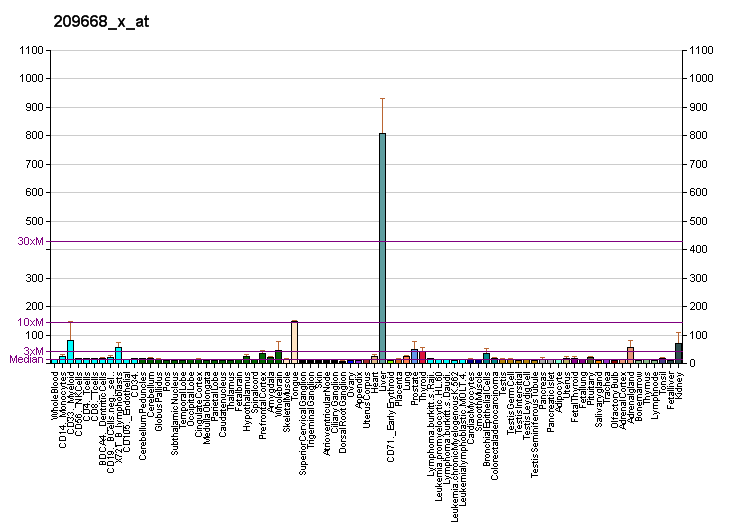

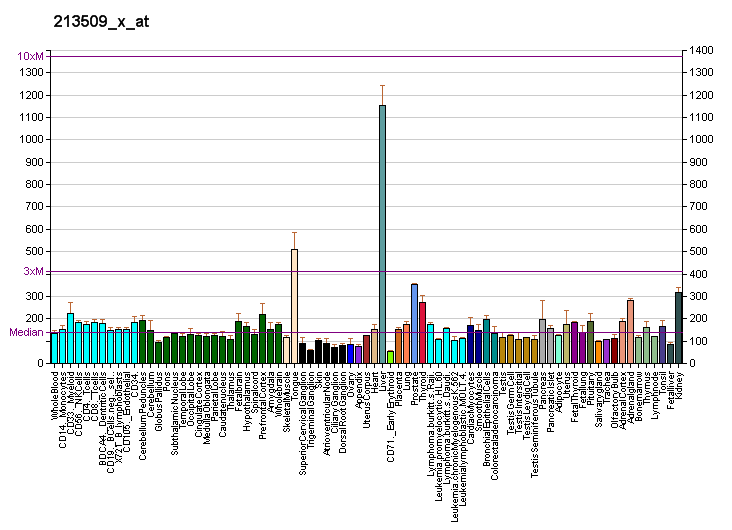
RNA expression pattern
| Bgee | Human / Mouse (ortholog); Top expressed in: jejunal mucosa; mucosa of ileum; mucosa of colon; mucosa of sigmoid colon; duodenum; mucosa of transverse colon; mucosa of pharynx; rectum; right lobe of liver; kidney tubule / Top expressed in: proximal tubule; human kidney; right kidney; duodenum; jejunum; liver; colon; testicle; islet of Langerhans; More reference expression data |
| BioGPS | More reference expression data |
Gene ontology
| Molecular function | methylumbelliferyl-acetate deacetylase activity; hydrolase activity; carboxylic ester hydrolase activity; methyl indole-3-acetate esterase activity |
| Cellular component | endoplasmic reticulum lumen; endoplasmic reticulum; extracellular space |
| Biological process | xenobiotic metabolic process; catabolic process; prostaglandin metabolic process |
Sources:Amigo / QuickGO
Orthologs
| Databases | NCBI: entry; OMA: entry |
| Species | Human | Mouse |
| Entrez | 8824 | 436059 |
| Ensembl | ENSG00000172831 | ENSMUSG00000091813 |
| UniProt | O00748 | F6Z9B9 |
| RefSeq (mRNA) | NM_003869; NM_198061; NM_001365405; NM_001365406; NM_001365407 NM_001365408 | NM_001272045 |
| RefSeq (protein) | NP_003860; NP_932327; NP_001352334; NP_001352335; NP_001352336 NP_001352337 | NP_001258974 |
| Location (UCSC) | Chr 16: 66.93 – 66.95 Mb | Chr 8: 105.73 – 105.75 Mb |
| PubMed search |
- Wikidata
| View/Edit Human | View/Edit Mouse |

Carboxylesterase 2 is an enzyme that in humans is encoded by the CES2 gene. It is a member of the alpha/beta fold hydrolase family.

Carboxylesterase 2 is a member of a large multigene family. The enzymes encoded by these genes are responsible for the hydrolysis of ester- and amide-bond-containing drugs such as cocaine and heroin. They also hydrolyze long-chain fatty acid esters and thioesters. The specific function of this enzyme has not yet been determined; however, it is speculated that carboxylesterases may play a role in lipid metabolism and/or the blood–brain barrier system. Two alternatively spliced transcript variants encoding distinct isoforms have been found for this gene.

== Interactive pathway map ==
Click on genes, proteins and metabolites below to link to respective articles. (Note: The interactive pathway map can be edited at WikiPathways: "FluoropyrimidineActivity_WP1601".)

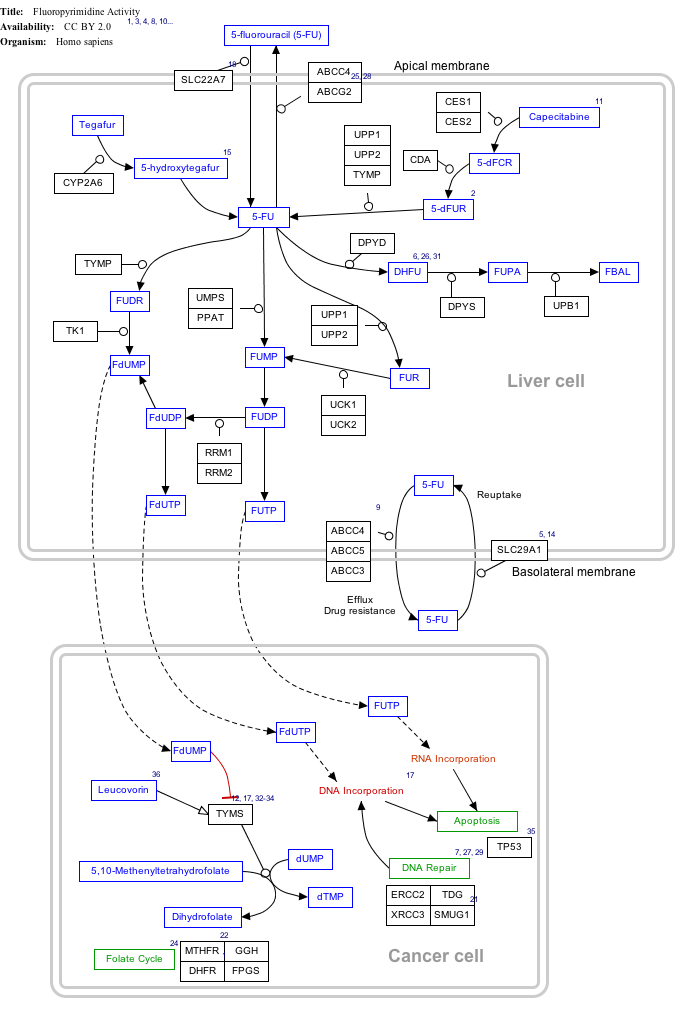

Fluorouracil (5-FU) Activity edit

Click on genes, proteins and metabolites below to link to respective articles. (Note: The interactive pathway map can be edited at WikiPathways: "IrinotecanPathway_WP229".)

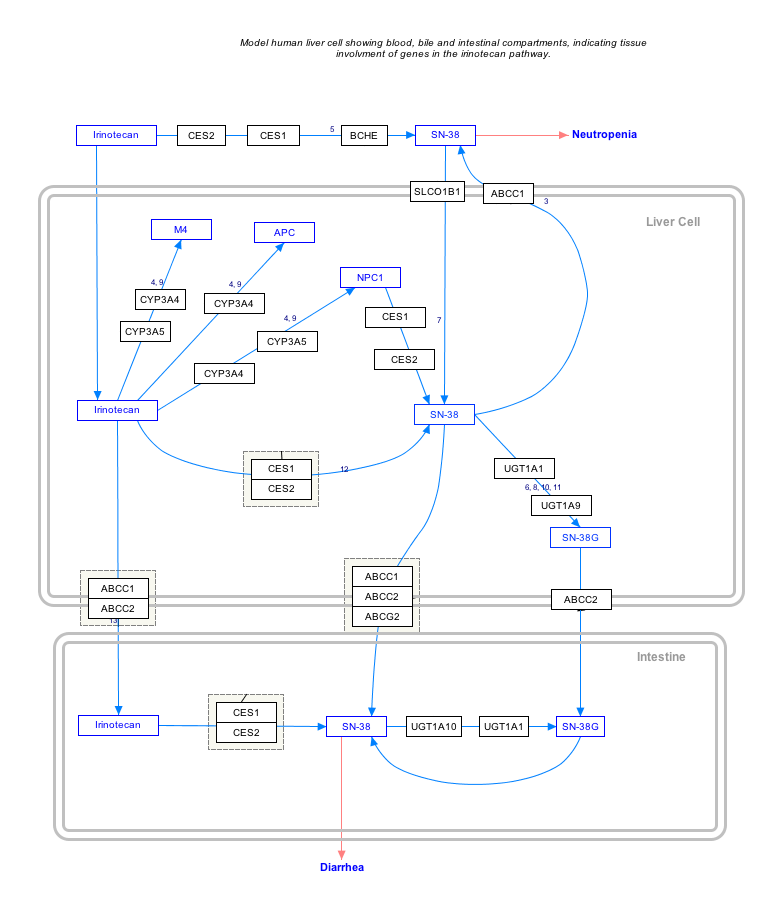

Irinotecan Pathway edit
