= Acetylcholinesterase =

Primary cholinesterase in the body

ACHE
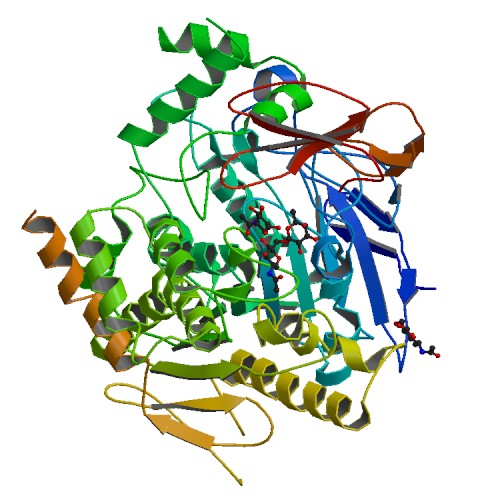

Identifiers
- Aliases: ACHE, AChE, acetylhydrolase, acetylcholinesterase (Yt blood group), ACEE, ARN-YT, acetylcholinesterase (Cartwright blood group), true cholinesterase (dated synonym)
- External IDs: OMIM: 100740; MGI: 87876; HomoloGene: 543; GeneCards: ACHE; OMA:ACHE - orthologs

Gene location (Human)
Chr.	Chromosome 7 (human)
Band	7q22.1	Start	100,889,994 bp
Band	7q22.1	End	100,896,974 bp

Gene location (Mouse)
Chr.	Chromosome 5 (mouse)
Band	5 G2|5 76.32 cM	Start	137,285,781 bp
Band	5 G2|5 76.32 cM	End	137,292,728 bp
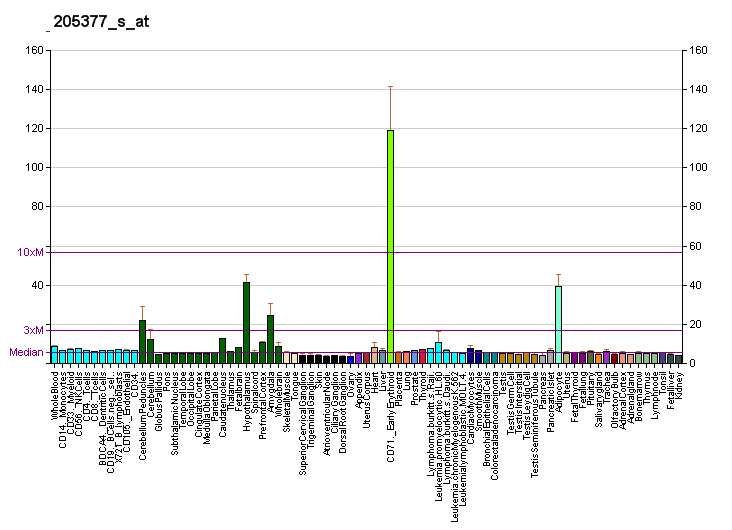

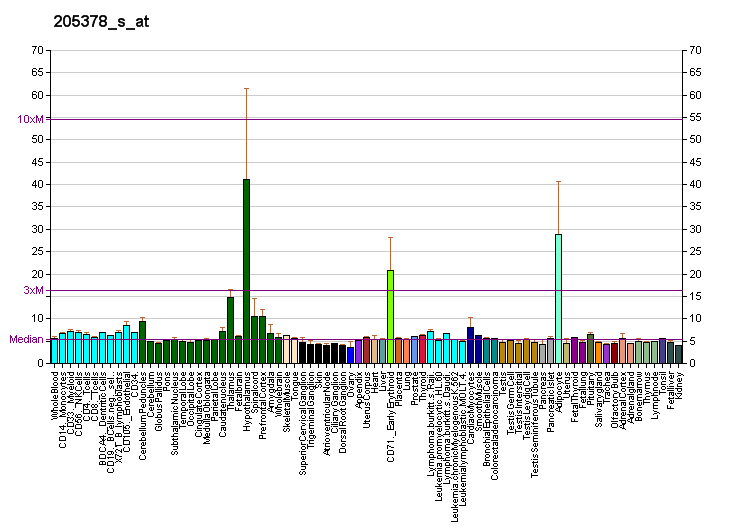
RNA expression pattern
Bgee	Human / Mouse (ortholog); Top expressed in: muscle of thigh; right hemisphere of cerebellum; hypothalamus; gastrocnemius muscle; nucleus accumbens; triceps brachii muscle; Skeletal muscle tissue of rectus abdominis; right frontal lobe; putamen; caudate nucleus / Top expressed in: medulla oblongata; pons; central gray substance of midbrain; bone marrow; superior colliculus; hypothalamus; cerebellar cortex; striatum of neuraxis; nucleus of stria terminalis; inferior colliculi; More reference expression data
BioGPS	More reference expression data
Orthologs
Species	Human	Mouse
Entrez	43	11423
Ensembl	ENSG00000087085	ENSMUSG00000023328
UniProt	n a	P21836
RefSeq (mRNA)	NM_000665; NM_001282449; NM_001302621; NM_001302622; NM_015831 NM_001367915; NM_001367917; NM_001367918; NM_001367919	NM_001290010; NM_009599
RefSeq (protein)	n/a	NP_001276939; NP_033729
Location (UCSC)	Chr 7: 100.89 – 100.9 Mb	Chr 5: 137.29 – 137.29 Mb
PubMed search
- Wikidata
View/Edit Human	View/Edit Mouse

acetylcholinesterase
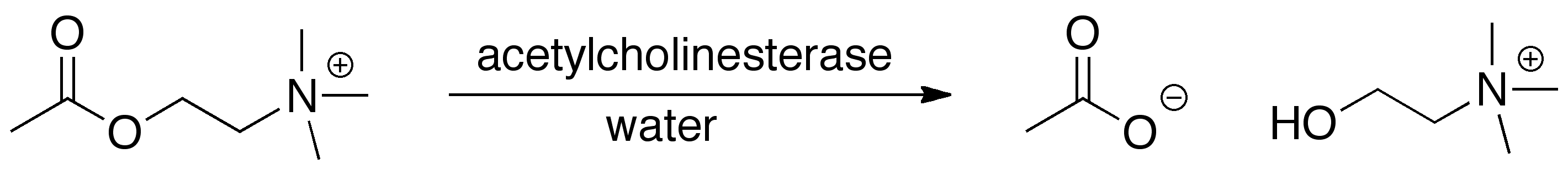
- Acetylcholinesterase catalyzes the hydrolysis of acetylcholine to acetate ion and choline

Identifiers
- EC no.: 3.1.1.7
- CAS no.: 9000-81-1

Databases
- IntEnz: IntEnz view
- BRENDA: BRENDA entry
- ExPASy: NiceZyme view
- KEGG: KEGG entry
- MetaCyc: metabolic pathway
- PRIAM: profile
- PDB structures: RCSB PDB PDBe PDBsum
- Gene Ontology: AmiGO / QuickGO
Search
- PMC: articles
- PubMed: articles
- NCBI: proteins

Acetylcholinesterase (AChE) acetylcholine acetylhydrolase, also known as AChase or acetylhydrolase, is the primary type of cholinesterase in the body, coded for in the human by the gene ACHE. It is an enzyme that catalyzes the breakdown of acetylcholine and some other choline esters that function as neurotransmitters:

acetylcholine + H_{2}O = choline + acetate

It is found at mainly neuromuscular junctions and in chemical synapses of the cholinergic type, where its activity serves to terminate cholinergic synaptic transmission. It belongs to the carboxylesterase family of enzymes. It is the primary target of inhibition by organophosphorus compounds such as nerve agents and pesticides.

== Enzyme structure and mechanism ==
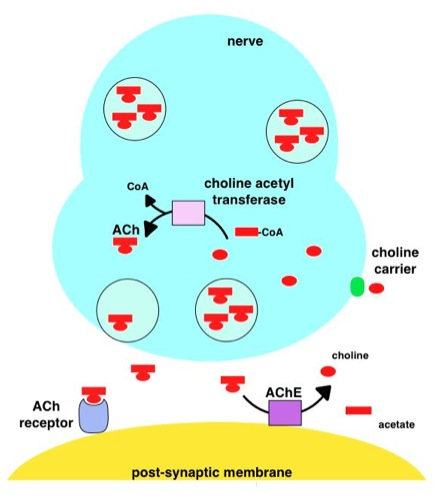
AChe mechanism of action

AChE is a hydrolase that hydrolyzes choline esters. It has a very high catalytic activity—each molecule of AChE degrades about 5,000 molecules of acetylcholine (ACh) per second, approaching the limit allowed by diffusion of the substrate. The active site of AChE comprises two subsites—the anionic site and the esteratic subsite. The structure and mechanism of action of AChE have been elucidated from the crystal structure of the enzyme.

The anionic subsite accommodates the positive quaternary amine of acetylcholine as well as other cationic substrates and inhibitors. The cationic substrates are not bound by a negatively charged amino acid in the anionic site, but by interaction of 14 aromatic residues that line a gorge leading to the active site. All 14 amino acids in the aromatic gorge are highly conserved across different species. Among the aromatic amino acids, tryptophan 84 is critical and its substitution with alanine results in a 3000-fold decrease in reactivity. The gorge is approximately 20 angstroms deep and five angstroms wide.

The esteratic subsite, where acetylcholine is hydrolyzed to acetate and choline, contains the catalytic triad of three amino acids: serine 203, histidine 447 and glutamate 334. These three amino acids are similar to the triad in other serine proteases except that the glutamate is the third member rather than aspartate. Moreover, the triad is of opposite chirality to that of other proteases. The hydrolysis reaction of the carboxyl ester leads to the formation of an acyl-enzyme and free choline. Then, the acyl-enzyme undergoes nucleophilic attack by a water molecule, assisted by the histidine 440 group, liberating acetic acid and regenerating the free enzyme.

== Species ==
AChE is found in many biological species, including humans and other mammals, invertebrates, and plants.

In humans, AChE is a cholinergic enzyme involved in the hydrolysis of the neurotransmitter acetylcholine (ACh) into its constituents, choline, and acetate. Overall, in mammals, AChE is primarily involved in the termination of impulse transmission at cholinergic synapses by rapid hydrolysis of the neurotransmitter acetylcholine. In invertebrates, AChE plays a similar role in nerve conduction processes at the neuromuscular junction. It is usually located in the membranes of these animals and controls ionic currents in excitable membranes.

In plants, the biological functions of AChE are less clear, and its existence has been recognized by indirect evidence of its activity. For instance, a study on Solanum lycopersicum (tomato) identified 87 SlAChE genes containing GDSL lipase/acylhydrolase domain. The study also showed up-and down-regulation of SlAChE genes under salinity stress condition.

Some marine fungi have been found to produce compounds that inhibit AChE. However, the specific role and mechanisms of AChE in fungi are not as well-studied as in mammals. The presence and role of AChE in bacteria is not well-documented.

== Biological function ==
During neurotransmission, ACh is released from the presynaptic neuron into the synaptic cleft and binds to ACh receptors on the post-synaptic membrane, relaying the signal from the nerve. AChE is concentrated in the synaptic cleft, where it terminates the signal transmission by hydrolyzing ACh. The liberated choline is taken up again by the pre-synaptic neuron and ACh is synthesized by combining with acetyl-CoA through the action of choline acetyltransferase.

A cholinomimetic drug disrupts this process by acting as a cholinergic neurotransmitter that is impervious to acetylcholinesterase's lysing action.

== Disease relevance ==
Drugs or toxins that inhibit AChE lead to persistence of high concentrations of ACh within synapses, leading to increased cholinergic signaling within the central nervous system, autonomic ganglia and neuromuscular junctions.

Mechanism of Inhibitors of AChE

Irreversible inhibitors of AChE may lead to muscular paralysis, convulsions, bronchial constriction, and death by asphyxiation. Organophosphates (OP), esters of phosphoric acid, are a class of irreversible AChE inhibitors. Cleavage of OP by AChE leaves a phosphoryl group in the esteratic site, which is slow to be hydrolyzed (on the order of days) and can become covalently bound. Irreversible AChE inhibitors have been used in insecticides (e.g., malathion) and nerve gases for chemical warfare (e.g., Sarin and VX). Carbamates, esters of N-methyl carbamic acid, are AChE inhibitors that hydrolyze in hours and have been used for medical purposes (e.g., physostigmine for the treatment of glaucoma). Reversible inhibitors occupy the esteratic site for short periods of time (seconds to minutes) and are used to treat of a range of central nervous system diseases. Tetrahydroaminoacridine (THA) and donepezil are FDA-approved to improve cognitive function in Alzheimer's disease. Rivastigmine is also used to treat Alzheimer's and Lewy body dementia, and pyridostigmine bromide is used to treat myasthenia gravis.

An endogenous inhibitor of AChE in neurons is Mir-132 microRNA, which may limit inflammation in the brain by silencing the expression of this protein and allowing ACh to act in an anti-inflammatory capacity.

It has also been shown that the main active ingredient in cannabis, tetrahydrocannabinol, is a competitive inhibitor of acetylcholinesterase.

== Distribution ==
AChE is found in many types of conducting tissue: nerve and muscle, central and peripheral tissues, motor and sensory fibers, and cholinergic and noncholinergic fibers. The activity of AChE is higher in motor neurons than in sensory neurons.

Acetylcholinesterase is also found on the red blood cell membranes, where different forms constitute the Yt blood group antigens. Acetylcholinesterase exists in multiple molecular forms, which possess similar catalytic properties, but differ in their oligomeric assembly and mode of attachment to the cell surface.

== AChE gene ==
In mammals, acetylcholinesterase is encoded by a single AChE gene while some invertebrates have multiple acetylcholinesterase genes. Note higher vertebrates also encode a closely related paralog BCHE (butyrylcholinesterase) with 50% amino acid identity to ACHE. Diversity in the transcribed products from the sole mammalian gene arises from alternative mRNA splicing and post-translational associations of catalytic and structural subunits. There are three known forms: T (tail), R (read through), and H (hydrophobic).

=== AChE_{T} ===
The major form of acetylcholinesterase found in brain, muscle, and other tissues, known as is the hydrophilic species, which forms disulfide-linked oligomers with collagenous, or lipid-containing structural subunits. In the neuromuscular junctions AChE expresses in asymmetric form which associates with ColQ or subunit. In the central nervous system it is associated with PRiMA which stands for Proline Rich Membrane anchor to form symmetric form. In either case, the ColQ or PRiMA anchor serves to maintain the enzyme in the intercellular junction, ColQ for the neuromuscular junction and PRiMA for synapses.

=== AChE_{H} ===
The other, alternatively spliced form expressed primarily in the erythroid tissues, differs at the C-terminus, and contains a cleavable hydrophobic peptide with a PI-anchor site. It associates with membranes through the phosphoinositide (PI) moieties added post-translationally.

=== AChE_{R} ===
The third type has, so far, only been found in Torpedo sp. and mice although it is hypothesized in other species. It is thought to be involved in the stress response and, possibly, inflammation.

== Nomenclature ==
The nomenclatural variations of ACHE and of cholinesterases generally are discussed at Cholinesterase § Types and nomenclature.

== Inhibitors ==
For acetylcholine esterase (AChE), reversible inhibitors are those that do not irreversibly bond to and deactivate AChE. Drugs that reversibly inhibit acetylcholine esterase are being explored as treatments for Alzheimer's disease and myasthenia gravis, among others. Examples include tacrine and donepezil.

Exposure to acetylcholinesterase inhibitors is one of several studied explanations for the chronic cognitive symptoms veterans displayed after returning from the Gulf War. Soldiers were dosed with AChEI pyridostigmine bromide (PB) as protection from nerve agent weapons. Studying acetylcholine levels using microdialysis and HPLC-ECD, researchers at the University of South Carolina School of Medicine determined PB, when combined with a stress element can lead to cognitive responses.

- Phytocannabinoids
  - Cannabidiol
  - Δ^{8}-Tetrahydrocannabinol
  - Cannabigerol
  - Cannabigerolic acid
  - Cannabicitran
  - Cannabidivarin
  - Cannabichromene
  - Cannabinol

== See also ==
- Cholinesterases
