= Postsynaptic density =

Layout of proteins anchoring neurotransmitter receptors

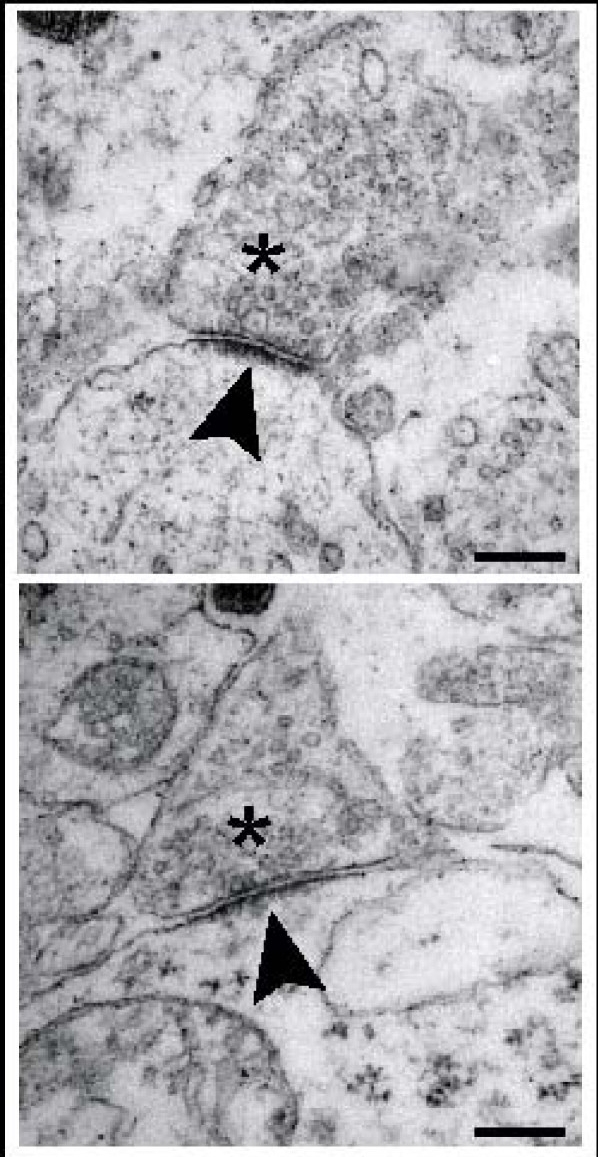
- Ultra-structural analysis of synapses in the brainstem of wild-type (WT) mice at embryonic day 18.5. Synapses of WT neurons in the pre-Bötzinger-complex area exhibit presynaptic vesicles (asterisks), a synaptic cleft and a distinct postsynaptic density (arrowheads). Scale bar, 250 nm. From Heupel et al., 2008

Details
- System: Nervous system

Identifiers
- Latin: densitas postsynaptica
- MeSH: D057907
- TH: H2.00.06.2.00021

The postsynaptic density (PSD) is a protein dense specialization attached to the postsynaptic membrane. PSDs were originally identified by electron microscopy as an electron-dense region at the membrane of a postsynaptic neuron. The PSD is in close apposition to the presynaptic active zone and ensures that receptors are in close proximity to presynaptic neurotransmitter release sites. PSDs vary in size and composition among brain regions, and have been studied in great detail at glutamatergic synapses. Hundreds of proteins have been identified in the postsynaptic density, including glutamate receptors, scaffold proteins, and many signaling molecules.

== Structure ==
The structure and composition of the PSD have been the focus of numerous molecular studies of synaptic plasticity, a cellular model of learning and memory. In mammals, PSDs are on the order of 250 to 500 nanometres in diameter and 25 to 50 nanometres in thickness, depending on the activity state of the synapse. During synaptic plasticity, the total size of the PSD is increased along with an increase in synaptic size and strength after inducing long-term potentiation at single synapses.

In invertebrates, synapses are often are polyadic, meaning they have multiple PSDs opposed to one presynaptic element (commonly called a T-bar, due to its most common appearance).

=== Composition ===
Many proteins in the PSD are involved in the regulation of synaptic function. These include

- postsynaptic density-95 (PSD95)
- neuroligin (a cellular adhesion molecule)
- NMDA receptors, AMPA receptors
- calcium/calmodulin-dependent protein kinase II
- actin

As protein detection technologies have increased in sensitivity, such as with improvements in mass spectrometry techniques, more proteins have come to be associated with PSDs. Current estimates hold that more than several hundred proteins are found at PSDs among brain regions and during different states of development and synaptic activity. PSDs also contain cell adhesion molecules and a diverse set of other signaling proteins. Many of the PSD proteins contain PDZ domains.

== Function ==
The PSD has been proposed to concentrate and organize neurotransmitter receptors in the synaptic cleft. The PSD also serves as a signaling apparatus. For instance kinases and phosphatases in the PSD are activated and released from the PSD to change the activity of proteins located in the spine or are transported to the nucleus to affect protein synthesis. Some of the features of the PSD are similar to the neuromuscular junction and other cellular junctions, as the PSD has been modeled as a specialized cellular junction that allows for rapid, asymmetrical signaling.

== Imaging ==
Most imaging of PSDs is done with electron microscopy, where the sample is fixed, stained, and embedded in plastic. The PSD appears as a dark electron-dense region, but the monochrome EM images provide little information on the composition of the PSD. Conversely, experimental optical expansion techniques such as LICONN embed the sample in a transparent gel, and use antibodies for labelling. Associating the antibodies with dyes of different colors can potentially yield information about the composition of individual PSDs.
