= NRXN3 =

Protein-coding gene in the species Homo sapiens

Identifiers
- Aliases: NRXN3, C14orf60, neurexin 3
- External IDs: OMIM: 600567; MGI: 1096389; GeneCards: NRXN3

Gene location (Human)
Chr.	Chromosome 14 (human)
Band	14q24.3-q31.1	Start	78,170,373 bp
Band	14q24.3-q31.1	End	79,868,291 bp

Gene location (Mouse)
Chr.	Chromosome 12 (mouse)
Band	12 D3|12 42.94 cM	Start	88,722,876 bp
Band	12 D3|12 42.94 cM	End	90,334,935 bp
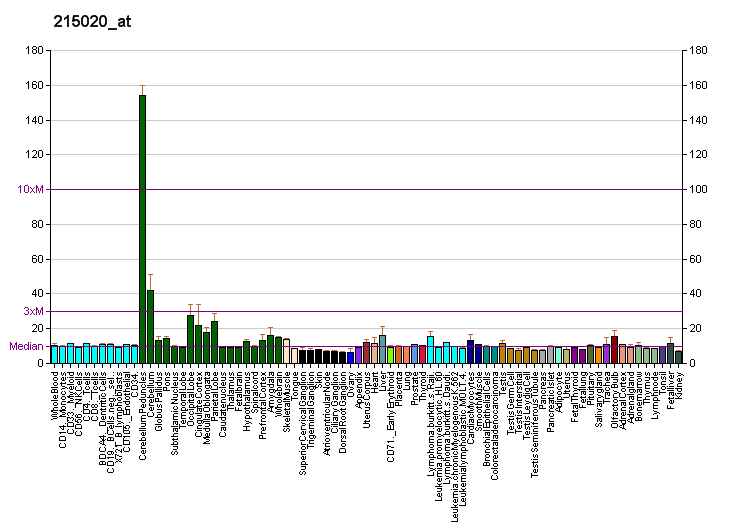

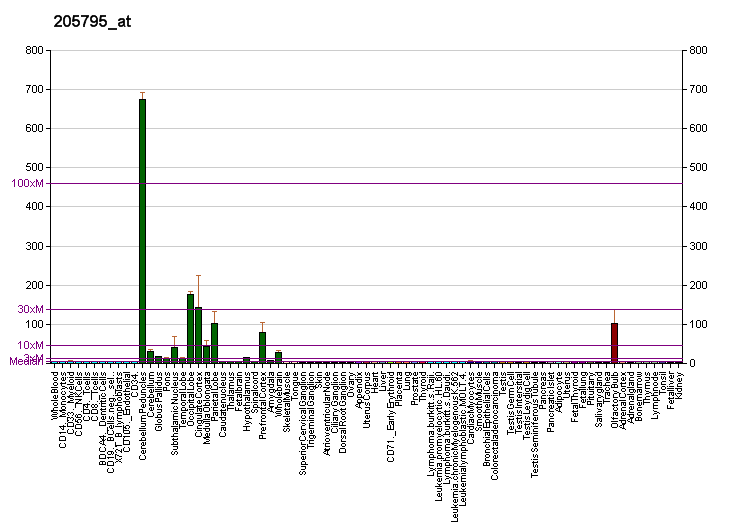

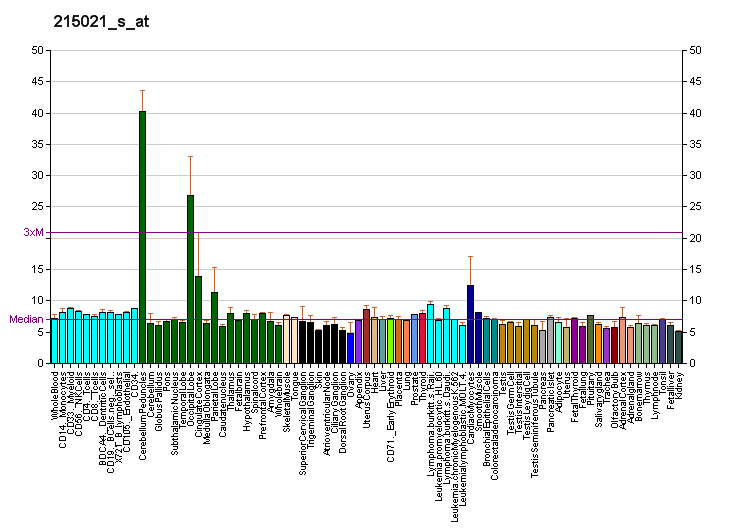
RNA expression pattern
Bgee	Human / Mouse (ortholog); Top expressed in: cerebellar vermis; pars compacta; pars reticulata; pons; Brodmann area 23; cerebellar hemisphere; right hemisphere of cerebellum; middle temporal gyrus; superior vestibular nucleus; external globus pallidus / Top expressed in: Rostral migratory stream; lateral septal nucleus; piriform cortex; lobe of cerebellum; cerebellar vermis; lateral geniculate nucleus; medial geniculate nucleus; anterior amygdaloid area; lateral hypothalamus; nucleus accumbens; More reference expression data
BioGPS	More reference expression data
Gene ontology
Molecular function	neuroligin family protein binding; transmembrane signaling receptor activity; cell adhesion molecule binding; metal ion binding; signaling receptor activity
Cellular component	integral component of membrane; membrane; plasma membrane; integral component of plasma membrane
Biological process	neuron cell-cell adhesion; social behavior; vocalization behavior; adult behavior; cell adhesion; learning; angiogenesis; signal transduction; axon guidance; positive regulation of synapse assembly; positive regulation of synapse maturation; synapse assembly; neurotransmitter secretion; chemical synaptic transmission
Sources:Amigo / QuickGO
Orthologs
Databases	NCBI: entry; OMA: entry
Species	Human	Mouse
Entrez	9369	18191
Ensembl	ENSG00000021645	ENSMUSG00000066392
UniProt	Q9HDB5	Q6P9K9; Q8C985
RefSeq (mRNA)	NM_001105250; NM_001272020; NM_004796; NM_138970; NM_001330195 NM_001366425; NM_001366426	NM_001198587; NM_001252074; NM_172544
RefSeq (protein)	NP_001098720; NP_001258949; NP_001317124; NP_004787; NP_620426 NP_001353354; NP_001353355; NP_004787.2	NP_001185516; NP_001239003; NP_766132; NP_001239003.1
Location (UCSC)	Chr 14: 78.17 – 79.87 Mb	Chr 12: 88.72 – 90.33 Mb
PubMed search
- Wikidata
View/Edit Human	View/Edit Mouse

Neurexin-3-alpha is a protein that in humans is encoded by the NRXN3 gene.

Neurexins are a family of proteins that function in the vertebrate nervous system as cell adhesion molecules and receptors. They are encoded by several unlinked genes of which two, NRXN1 and NRXN3, are among the largest known human genes. Three of the genes (NRXN1-3) utilize two alternate promoters and include numerous alternatively spliced exons to generate thousands of distinct mRNA transcripts and protein isoforms. The majority of transcripts are produced from the upstream promoter and encode alpha-neurexin isoforms; a much smaller number of transcripts are produced from the downstream promoter and encode beta-neurexin isoforms. The alpha-neurexins contain epidermal growth factor-like (EGF-like) sequences and laminin G domains, and have been shown to interact with neurexophilins. The beta-neurexins lack EGF-like sequences and contain fewer laminin G domains than alpha-neurexins. NRXN3 is thought to be involved in synaptic plasticity, and polymorphisms in NRXN3 have been linked to genetic predisposition towards a number of conditions such as alcohol or drug addiction, or obesity.
