= Neurexin =

Protein family

Neurexin family

Identifiers
- Symbol: NRXN1_fam
- Membranome: 15

neurexin 1
- 3D ribbon diagram of alpha-neurexin 1

Identifiers
- Symbol: NRXN1
- NCBI gene: 9378
- HGNC: 8008
- OMIM: 600565
- RefSeq: NM_001135659.1
- UniProt: Q9ULB1

Other data
- Locus: Chr. 2 p16.3
Search for
- Structures: Swiss-model
- Domains: InterPro

neurexin 2

Identifiers
- Symbol: NRXN2
- NCBI gene: 9379
- HGNC: 8009
- OMIM: 600566
- RefSeq: NM_015080
- UniProt: P58401

Other data
- Locus: Chr. 11 q13.1
Search for
- Structures: Swiss-model
- Domains: InterPro

neurexin 3

Identifiers
- Symbol: NRXN3
- NCBI gene: 9369
- HGNC: 8010
- OMIM: 600567
- RefSeq: NM_001105250
- UniProt: Q9HDB5

Other data
- Locus: Chr. 14 q31
Search for
- Structures: Swiss-model
- Domains: InterPro

neurexin

Identifiers
- Organism: Drosophila melanogaster
- Symbol: Nrx-IV
- Entrez: 39387
- Orthologs: NCBI: entry; OMA: entry
- RefSeq (mRNA): NM_168491.3
- RefSeq (Prot): NP_524034.2
- UniProt: Q94887

Other data
- Chromosome: 3L: 12.14 - 12.15 Mb
Search for
- Structures: Swiss-model
- Domains: InterPro

neurexin

Identifiers
- Organism: Mus musculus
- Symbol: Nrxn1
- Entrez: 18189
- Orthologs: NCBI: entry; OMA: entry
- RefSeq (mRNA): NM_177284.2
- RefSeq (Prot): NP_064648.3
- UniProt: Q9CS84

Other data
- Chromosome: 17: 90.03 - 91.09 Mb
Search for
- Structures: Swiss-model
- Domains: InterPro

Neurexins (NRXN) are a family of presynaptic cell adhesion proteins that have roles in connecting neurons at the synapse. They are located mostly on the presynaptic membrane and contain a single transmembrane domain. The extracellular domain interacts with proteins in the synaptic cleft, most notably neuroligin, while the intracellular cytoplasmic portion interacts with proteins associated with exocytosis. Neurexin and neuroligin "shake hands," resulting in the connection between the two neurons and the production of a synapse. Neurexins mediate signaling across the synapse, and influence the properties of neural networks by synapse specificity. Neurexins were discovered as receptors for α-latrotoxin, a vertebrate-specific toxin in black widow spider venom that binds to presynaptic receptors and induces massive neurotransmitter release. In humans, alterations in genes encoding neurexins are implicated in autism and other cognitive diseases, such as Tourette syndrome and schizophrenia.

== Structure ==
In mammals, neurexin is encoded by three different genes (NRXN1, NRXN2, and NRXN3) each controlled by two different promoters, an upstream alpha (α) and a downstream beta (β), resulting in alpha-neurexins 1-3 (α-neurexins 1–3) and beta-neurexins 1-3 (β-neurexins 1–3). In addition, there are 5 sites of alternative splicing in α-neurexin, and 2 in β-neurexin. Together they provide for more than 2000 splice variants, suggesting a role of neurexin in determining synapse specificity.

The encoded proteins are structurally similar to laminin, slit, and agrin, other proteins involved in axon guidance and synaptogenesis. α-Neurexins and β-neurexins have identical intracellular domains but different extracellular domains. The extracellular domain of α-neurexin is composed of three neurexin repeats which each contain LNS (laminin, neurexin, sex-hormone binding globulin) – EGF (epidermal growth factor) – LNS domains. N1α binds to a variety of ligands including neuroligins and GABA receptors, though neurons of every receptor type express neurexins. β-Neurexins are shorter versions of α-neurexins, containing only one LNS domain. β-Neurexins (located presynaptically) act as receptors for neuroligin (located postsynaptically). Additionally, β-Neurexin has also been found to play a role in angiogenesis.

The C terminus of the short intracellular section of both types of neurexins binds to synaptotagmin and to the PDZ (postsynaptic density (PSD)-95/discs large/zona-occludens-1) domains of CASK and Mint. These interactions form connections between intracellular synaptic vesicles and fusion proteins. Thus neurexins play an important role in assembling presynaptic and postsynaptic machinery.

Trans-synapse, the extracellular LNS domains have a functional region, the hyper-variable surface, formed by loops carrying 3 splice inserts. This region surrounds a coordinated Ca^{2+} ion and is the site of neuroligin binding, resulting in a neurexin-neuroligin Ca^{2+}-dependent complex at the junction of chemical synapses.

== Expression and function ==
Neurexins are diffusely distributed in neurons and become concentrated at presynaptic terminals as neurons mature. They have also been found at pancreatic beta islet cells even though the function at this location has yet to be elucidated. There exists a trans-synaptic dialog between neurexin and neuroligin. This bi-directional trigger aids in the formation of synapses and is a key component to modifying the neuronal network. Over-expression of either of these proteins causes an increase in synapse forming sites, thus providing evidence that neurexin plays a functional role in synaptogenesis. Conversely, the blocking of β-neurexin interactions reduces the number of excitatory and inhibitory synapses. It is not clear how exactly neurexin promotes the formation of synapses. One possibility is that actin is polymerized on the tail end of β-neurexin, which traps and stabilizes accumulating synaptic vesicles. This forms a forward feeding cycle, where small clusters of β-neurexins recruit more β-neurexins and scaffolding proteins to form a large synaptic adhesive contact.

== Neurexin Binding Partners ==
=== Neurexin-Neureoligin binding ===
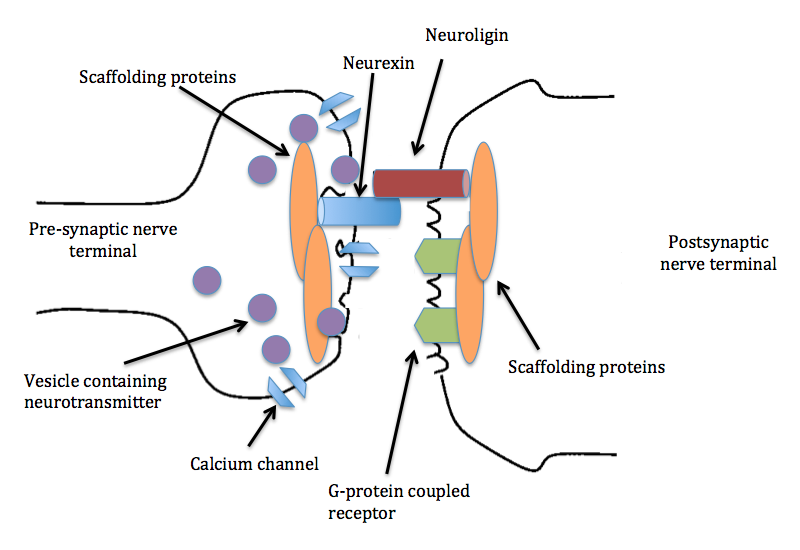
The trans-synaptic dialog between neurexin and neuroligin organizes the apposition of pre- and post-synaptic machinery by recruiting scaffolding proteins and other synaptic elements such as NMDA receptors, CASK, and synaptotagmin, all of which are necessary for a synapse to exist.

The different combinations of neurexin to neuroligin, and alternative splicing of neuroligin and neurexin genes, control binding between neuroligins and neurexins, adding to synapse specificity. Neurexins alone are capable of recruiting neuroligins in postsynaptic cells to a dendritic surface, resulting in clustered neurotransmitter receptors and other postsynaptic proteins and machinery. Their neuroligin partners can induce presynaptic terminals by recruiting neurexins. Synapse formation can therefore be triggered in either direction by these proteins. Neuroligins and neurexins can also regulate formation of glutamatergic (excitatory) synapses, and GABAergic (inhibitory) contacts using a neuroligin link. Regulating these contacts suggests neurexin-neuroligin binding could balance synaptic input, or maintain an optimal ratio of excitatory to inhibitory contacts.

=== Additional interacting partners ===
==== Dystroglycans ====
Neurexins not only bind to neuroligin. Additional binding partners of neurexin are dystroglycan. Dystroglycan is Ca^{2+}-dependent and binds preferentially to α-neurexins on LNS domains that lack splice inserts. In mice, a deletion of dystroglycan causes long-term potentiation impairment and developmental abnormalities similar to muscular dystrophy; however baseline synaptic transmission is normal.

==== Neuroexophilins ====
Representation of Neurexin and binding partners in the synaptic cleft

Neuroexophilins are also known to bind to neurexins and are present at the synaptic cleft but are not membrane bound. Neuroexophilins are Ca^{2+}-independent and bind exclusively to α-neurexins on the second LNS domain. The increased startle responses and impaired motor coordination of neuroexophilin knockout mice indicates that neuroexophilins have a functional role in certain circuits.

==== Latrophilins ====
Latrophilins are adhesion G protein-coupled receptors that reside on the postsynaptic membrane. Without latrophillins in mice a loss of excitatory synapses was experienced in pyramidal neurons. Latrophillins while in association with neurexin have been shown to act as postsynaptic recognition molecules for incoming axons.

==== Cerebellins ====
Cerebellins are small proteins that are secreted into the synaptic cleft where they associate with other cerebellins to form a hexamer which binds two neurexins. Cerebellins bind to GluD1 and GluD2 on the postsynaptic side while bound to neurexin presynaptically. GluD1 and GluD2 are homologous to ionotropic glutamate receptors, but function as adhesion molecules instead of glutamate receptors. Despite being present throughout the brain, their function is only known within the cerebellum, the structure they are named after. When removed from the cerebellum a decrease of parallel fiber synapses is observed with a loss of half of all these synapses. Outside of the cerebellum the function of Cerebellin is still not clear.

==== LRRTMs ====
LRRTM is a postsynaptic protein that binds to neurexin at the same Ca^{2+} domain that neuroligin does despite having a distinct structure. It has also been found that LRRTM binds AMPA receptors. This is believed to be what causes the loss of excitatory signaling when LRRTM is not present. Much is still not known about LRRTM even though it is the binding partner that binds to neurexin with the highest affinity.

==== C1q1s ====
C1Q1's structure is similar to that of cerebellin as it is a small protein that is secreted that associates with multiple copies of itself. C1q1 while in the synaptic cleft binds neurexin on the presynaptic side and BAI3 which is another adhesion G protein-coupled receptor. The deletion of c1q1 causes the loss of climbing fibers and excitatory signaling in general. C1q1s are found broadly throughout the brain including the prefrontal cortex, amygdala, cerebellum, and potentially more.

== Species distribution ==
Members of the neurexin family are found across all animals, including basal metazoans such as porifera (sponges), cnidaria (jellyfish) and ctenophora (comb jellies). Porifera lack synapses so its role in these organisms is unclear.

Homologues of α-neurexin have also been found in several invertebrate species including Drosophila, Caenorhabditis elegans, honeybees and Aplysia. In Drosophila melanogaster, NRXN genes (only one α-neurexin) are critical in the assembly of glutamatergic neuromuscular junctions but are much simpler. Their functional roles in insects are likely similar to those in vertebrates.

== Role in synaptic maturation ==
Neurexin and neuroligin have been found to be active in synapse maturation and adaptation of synaptic strength. Studies in knockout mice show that the trans-synaptic binding team does not increase the number of synaptic sites, but rather increases the strength of the existing synapses. Deletion of the neurexin genes in the mice significantly impaired synaptic function, but did not alter synaptic structure. This is attributed to the impairment of specific voltage gated ion channels. While neuroligin and neurexin are not required for synaptic formation, they are essential components for proper function.

== Clinical importance and applications ==
Recent studies link mutations in genes encoding neurexin and neuroligin to a spectrum of cognitive disorders, such as autism spectrum disorders (ASDs), schizophrenia, and mental retardation. Cognitive diseases remain difficult to understand, as they are characterized by subtle changes in a subgroup of synapses in a circuit rather than impairment of all systems in all circuits. Depending on the circuit, these subtle synapse changes may produce different neurological symptoms, leading to classification of different diseases. Counterarguments to the relationship between cognitive disorders and these mutations exist, prompting further investigation into the underlying mechanisms producing these cognitive disorders.

=== Autism ===
Autism is a neurodevelopmental disorder characterized by qualitative deficits in social behavior and communication, often including restricted, repetitive patterns of behavior. It includes a subset of three disorders: childhood disintegrative disorder (CDD), Asperger syndrome (AS), and pervasive developmental disorder – not otherwise specified (PDD-NOS). A small percentage of ASD patients present with single mutations in genes encoding neuroligin-neurexin cell adhesion molecules. Neurexin is crucial to synaptic function and connectivity, as highlighted in wide spectrum of neurodevelopmental phenotypes in individuals with neurexin deletions. This provides strong evidence that neurexin deletions result in increased risk of ASDs, and indicate synapse dysfunction as the possible site of autism origin. Dr. Steven Clapcote et al.'s α-neurexin II (Nrxn2α) KO mice experiments demonstrate a causal role for the loss of Nrxn2α in the genesis of autism-related behaviors in mice.

=== Schizophrenia ===
Schizophrenia is a debilitating neuropsychiatric illness with multiple genes and environmental exposures involved in its genesis. Further research indicates that deletion of the NRXN1 gene increases the risk of schizophrenia. Genomic duplications and deletions on a micro-level – known as copy number variants (CNVs) – often underlie neurodevelopmental syndromes. Genomic-wide scans suggest that individuals with schizophrenia have rare structural variants that deleted or duplicated one or more genes. As these studies only indicate an increased risk, further research is necessary to elucidate the underlying mechanisms of the genesis of cognitive diseases.

=== Intellectual disability and Tourette syndrome ===
Similar to schizophrenia, studies have shown that intellectual disability and Tourette syndrome are also associated with NRXN1 deletions. A recent study shows that NRXN genes 1-3 are essential for survival and play a pivotal and overlapping role with each other in neurodevelopment. These genes have been directly disrupted in Tourette syndrome by independent genomic rearrangements. Another study suggests that NLGN4 mutations can be associated with a wide spectrum of neuropsychiatric conditions and that carriers may be affected with milder symptoms.

== See also ==
- Cell adhesion molecule
- Synaptogenesis
