= Carboxylesterase 3 =

Protein-coding gene in the species Homo sapiens

CES3

Identifiers
- Aliases: CES3, ES31, carboxylesterase 3
- External IDs: OMIM: 605279; MGI: 102773; GeneCards: CES3
Enzyme activity
EC #	BRENDA	ExPASy	KEGG	MetaCyc
3.1.1.1	↗	↗	↗	↗

Gene location (Human)
Chr.	Chromosome 16 (human)
Band	16q22.1	Start	66,961,245 bp
Band	16q22.1	End	66,975,149 bp

Gene location (Mouse)
Chr.	Chromosome 8 (mouse)
Band	8|8 D3	Start	105,775,233 bp
Band	8|8 D3	End	105,785,045 bp
RNA expression pattern
Bgee	Human / Mouse (ortholog); Top expressed in: mucosa of transverse colon; rectum; right lobe of liver; mucosa of sigmoid colon; mucosa of ileum; muscle of thigh; gastrocnemius muscle; jejunal mucosa; duodenum; tendon of biceps brachii / Top expressed in: hepatobiliary system; liver; duodenum; proximal tubule; pancreas; colon; ileum; jejunum; spermatid; testicle; More reference expression data
BioGPS	n/a
Gene ontology
Molecular function	hydrolase activity; carboxylic ester hydrolase activity; sterol esterase activity; triglyceride lipase activity; methyl indole-3-acetate esterase activity
Cellular component	endoplasmic reticulum lumen; endoplasmic reticulum; extracellular exosome; cytosol; extracellular space
Biological process	xenobiotic metabolic process; low-density lipoprotein particle clearance; lipid catabolic process
Sources:Amigo / QuickGO
Orthologs
Databases	NCBI: entry; OMA: entry
Species	Human	Mouse
Entrez	23491	382053
Ensembl	ENSG00000172828	ENSMUSG00000069922
UniProt	Q6UWW8	Q63880
RefSeq (mRNA)	NM_001185176; NM_001185177; NM_012122; NM_024922	NM_001164681; NM_198672
RefSeq (protein)	NP_001172105; NP_001172106; NP_079198	NP_001158153; NP_941074
Location (UCSC)	Chr 16: 66.96 – 66.98 Mb	Chr 8: 105.78 – 105.79 Mb
PubMed search
- Wikidata
View/Edit Human	View/Edit Mouse

Carboxylesterase 3 is an enzyme that in humans is encoded by the CES3 gene.

== Function ==
Carboxylesterase 3 is a member of a large multigene family. The enzymes encoded by these genes are responsible for the hydrolysis of ester- and amide-bond-containing drugs such as cocaine and heroin. They also hydrolyze long-chain fatty acid esters and thioesters. The specific function of this enzyme has not yet been determined; however, it is speculated that carboxylesterases may play a role in lipid metabolism and/or the blood–brain barrier system.
