= Alpha/beta hydrolase superfamily =

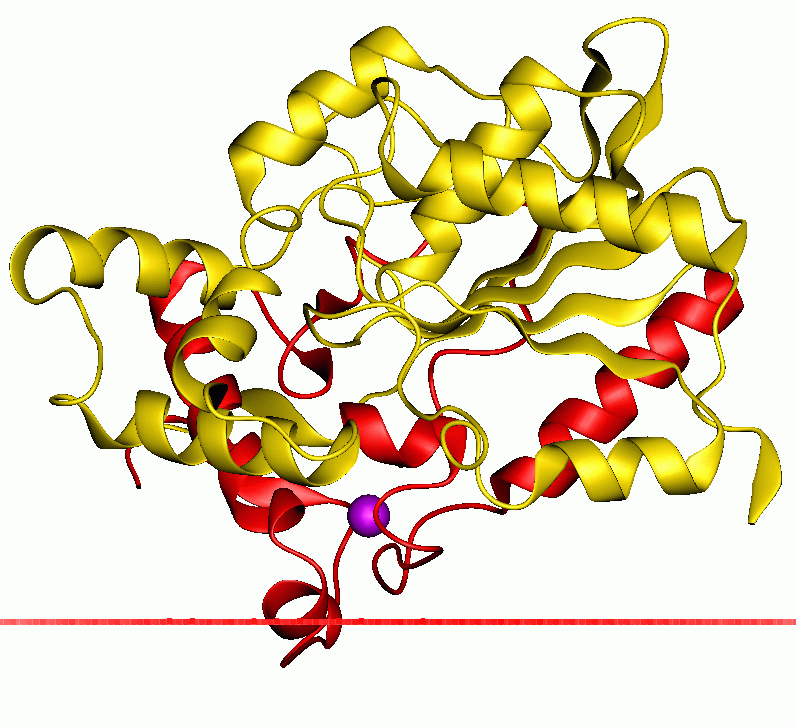
- A bacterial lipase, one of this family members

Identifiers
- Symbol: Abhydrolase_1
- Pfam: PF00561
- Pfam clan: CL0028
- ECOD: 7579.1.1
- InterPro: IPR029058
- SCOP2: 1ede / SCOPe / SUPFAM
- OPM superfamily: 127
- OPM protein: 1qge
- CDD: cl21494
- Membranome: 300
Available protein structures:
- PDB: IPR029058 PF00561 (ECOD; PDBsum)
- AlphaFold: IPR029058; PF00561

The alpha/beta hydrolase superfamily is a superfamily of hydrolytic enzymes of widely differing phylogenetic origin and catalytic function that share a common fold. The core of each enzyme is an alpha/beta-sheet (rather than a barrel), containing 8 beta strands connected by 6 alpha helices. The enzymes are believed to have diverged from a common ancestor, retaining little obvious sequence similarity, but preserving the arrangement of the catalytic residues. All have a catalytic triad, the elements of which are borne on loops, which are the best-conserved structural features of the fold.

The alpha/beta hydrolase fold includes proteases, lipases, peroxidases, esterases, epoxide hydrolases and dehalogenases.

== Database ==
The ESTHER database provides a large collection of information about this superfamily of proteins.

== Subfamilies ==
- 3-oxoadipate enol-lactonase InterPro: IPR012790

== Human proteins containing this domain ==
ABHD2; ABHD3; ABHD4; ABHD5; ABHD6; ABHD7; ABHD8; ABHD9; ABHD10; ABHD11; ABHD12; ABHD12B; ABHD13; ABHD16B; ABHD18; BAT5; BPHL; EPHX1; EPHX2; FAM108B1; LIPA; LIPF; LIPJ; LIPK; LIPM; LIPN; LYPLAL1; MEST; MGLL; PPME1; SERHL; SERHL2; SPG21; CES1; CES2

== See also ==
- Ecdysteroid-phosphate phosphatase - structure of a steroid phosphate phosphotase
- Serine hydrolase - an enzyme family that is composed largely of proteins with alpha-beta hydrolase folds
