= ABHD12 =

Protein-coding gene in the species Homo sapiens

Identifiers
- Aliases: ABHD12, ABHD12A, BEM46L2, C20orf22, PHARC, dJ965G21.2, abhydrolase domain containing 12, habhydrolase domain containing 12, lysophospholipase
- External IDs: OMIM: 613599; MGI: 1923442; GeneCards: ABHD12
Enzyme activity
EC #	BRENDA	ExPASy	KEGG	MetaCyc
3.1.1.23	↗	↗	↗	↗

Gene location (Human)
Chr.	Chromosome 20 (human)
Band	20p11.21	Start	25,294,742 bp
Band	20p11.21	End	25,390,835 bp

Gene location (Mouse)
Chr.	Chromosome 2 (mouse)
Band	2|2 G3	Start	150,674,413 bp
Band	2|2 G3	End	150,746,661 bp
RNA expression pattern
Bgee	Human / Mouse (ortholog); Top expressed in: C1 segment; prefrontal cortex; body of pancreas; left lobe of thyroid gland; right lobe of thyroid gland; right frontal lobe; cingulate gyrus; anterior cingulate cortex; nucleus accumbens; Brodmann area 9 / Top expressed in: transitional epithelium of urinary bladder; superior frontal gyrus; primary visual cortex; primary motor cortex; seminal vesicula; dentate gyrus of hippocampal formation granule cell; lateral hypothalamus; dorsomedial hypothalamic nucleus; pontine nuclei; cerebellar cortex; More reference expression data
BioGPS	n/a
Gene ontology
Molecular function	hydrolase activity; lysophospholipase activity; acylglycerol lipase activity; palmitoyl-(protein) hydrolase activity
Cellular component	integral component of membrane; plasma membrane; AMPA glutamate receptor complex; membrane; cytoplasm; dendrite cytoplasm
Biological process	acylglycerol catabolic process; phosphatidylserine catabolic process; adult walking behavior; response to auditory stimulus; monoacylglycerol catabolic process; glycerophospholipid catabolic process; protein depalmitoylation
Sources:Amigo / QuickGO
Orthologs
Databases	NCBI: entry; OMA: entry
Species	Human	Mouse
Entrez	26090	76192
Ensembl	ENSG00000100997	ENSMUSG00000032046
UniProt	Q8N2K0	Q99LR1
RefSeq (mRNA)	NM_001042472; NM_015600	NM_024465; NM_001356549; NM_001356550
RefSeq (protein)	NP_001035937; NP_056415	NP_077785; NP_001343478; NP_001343479
Location (UCSC)	Chr 20: 25.29 – 25.39 Mb	Chr 2: 150.67 – 150.75 Mb
PubMed search
- Wikidata
View/Edit Human	View/Edit Mouse

alpha/beta-Hydrolase domain containing 12 (ABHD12) is a serine hydrolase encoded by the ABHD12 gene that participates in the breakdown of the endocannabinoid neurotransmitter 2-arachidonylglycerol (2-AG) in the central nervous system. It is responsible for about 9% of brain 2-AG hydrolysis. Together, ABHD12 along with two other enzymes, monoacylglycerol lipase (MAGL) and ABHD6, control 99% of 2-AG hydrolysis in the brain. ABHD12 also serves as a lysophospholipase and metabolizes lysophosphatidylserine (LPS).

== Protein structure ==
ABHD12 is a ≈45 kDa integrated membrane glycoprotein, with an active site proposed to face into the extracellular space.

Currently, the crystal structure of ABHD12 is not known.

== Function ==
ABHD12 is a lysophosphatidylserine (lysoPS) lipase responsible for regulation of immune and neurological processes, and shown to act on the endocannabinoid arachidonoylglycerol (AG) as a monoacylglycerol lipase. Endocannabinoids are associated with a range of physiological processes. ABHD12 acts on 2-AG, and accounts for approximately 9% of 2-AG hydrolysis in the brain. Along with MAGL and ABHD6, ABHD12 is responsible for 99% of 2-AG hydrolysis in the brain, and has also been shown to act on the 1(3)-AG isomer. Based on the extracellular face of the ABHD12 active site and its ability to act on multiple isomeric substrates, ABHD12 has been suggested to act as a guard to the extracellular 2-AG-CB2R signalling pathway in microglia, and peripheral 2-AG signalling, however this has not been confirmed.

ABHD12 transcription is abundant in the brain, specifically microglia, but has also been identified in peripheral cell types like macrophages and osteoclasts. Murine models have shown ABHD12 plays a role in regulation of lysophosphatidylserine pathways in the brain.

== Clinical significance ==
Mutations that compromise the catalytic activity of ABHD12 have been causally linked to the rare neurodegenerative disease PHARC (polyneuropathy, hearing loss, ataxia, retinitis pigmentosa, cataracts) and a small proportion of retinitis pigmentosa.

== History ==
Identification of ABHD12 was first reported in genetic profiling of autosomal recessive retinitis pigmentosa in 1995. In 2010, mutations in ABHD12 were reported as a causal link for the neurodegenerative disease PHARC .

== Mutations ==
Mutations in ABHD12 are associated with the rare neurodegenerative disorder PHARC, as well as retinitis pigmentosa. Null mutations have been shown to lead to development of PHARC, while other mutations can result in a range of phenotypes, from non-syndromic retinal degeneration to PHARC.

Currently, PHARC has been identified in at least 27 individuals, with 15 identified loss of function variants of ABHD12, comprising four nonsense, four missense, four frameshift and one splicing mutation. ABHD12 missense mutations have been identified in individuals with retinitis pigmentosa, and a growing range of phenotypes associated with ABHD12 mutations from PHARC to non-syndromic retinal degeneration are being discovered.

In vitro, enzymatic activity of ABHD12 can be eliminated by site mutation the residues Serine-246, Aspartate-333, or Histidine-372, which form a catalytic triad in the hydrolase domain.

== Inhibitors ==
Inhibitors of ABHD12 have been identified. Orlistat (tetrahydrolipstatin; THL) and methyl arachidonyl fluorophosphonate (MAFP), so-called "universal lipase/serine hydrolase inhibitors" that are extremely non-selective enzyme inhibitors, were found to inhibit ABHD12. Selective reversible inhibitors have also been identified, including betulinic acid, maslinic acid, oleanolic acid, and ursolic acid.

== Models ==
The α/β hydrolase domain including lipase motif and catalytic triad is conserved between murine and human ABHD12.

Based on the observation of ABHD12 mutation in PHARC affected subjects, PHARC cell lines have been considered as human models of ABHD12 knockout.

Mouse knockout (ABHD12 -/-) models demonstrate cerebellar microgliosis, motor and auditory impairment, alongside elevated neuroinflammation with progression associated with age. These characteristics are considered PHARC-like phenotypes as a murine model for human PHARC, however the mouse knockout model doesn't demonstrate ocular or myelination defects, or early onset typical of PHARC. The ABHD -/- murine model shows increased long-chain lysoPS accumulation in the brain suggesting lysoPS signalling contributes to PHARC-like pathology.

A zebrafish knockdown (+/-) model has been developed which demonstrates ophthalmic defects including microphthalmia, lack of lens clarity, and disrupted retina architecture.

== Interactions ==
Elevated lysoPS accumulation in ABHD12 knockout mice suggests lysoPS as an in vivo substrate of ABHD12. Elevated lysoPS production in ABHD12 null cells from PHARC subjects can be reversed using an inhibitor of ABHD16A.

In vitro studies demonstrate enzymatic hydrolysis of monoacylglycerol long lipid chains by ABHD12. ABHD12 can use both 1(3)-AG and 2-AG as substrates at comparable enzymatic rates.

ABHD12 has been shown to be associated with AMPA type glutamate receptors in the brains of rats.

== See also ==
- Fatty acid amide hydrolase
- Serine hydrolase
- Endocannabinoid enhancer
