= JZL184 =

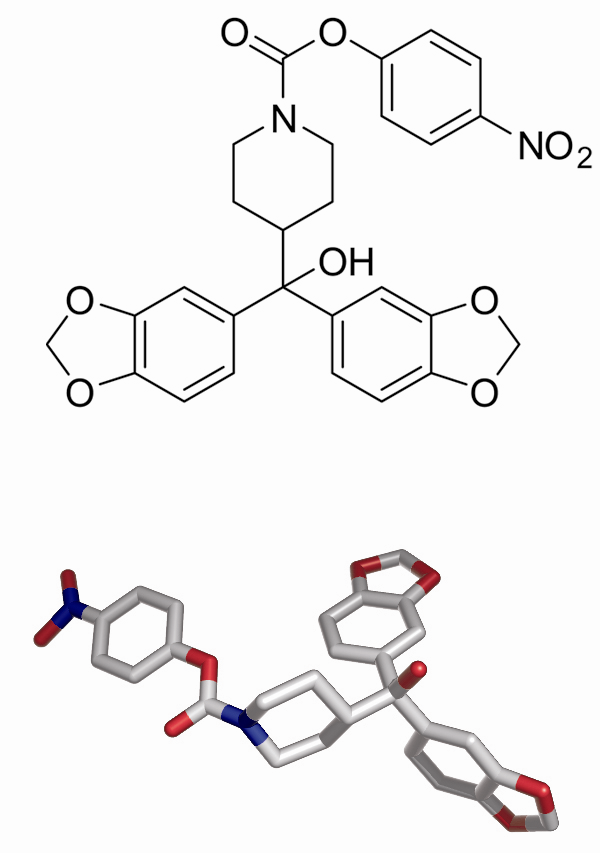

Names
- Preferred IUPAC name 4-Nitrophenyl 4-[di(2H-1,3-benzodioxol-5-yl)(hydroxy)methyl]piperidine-1-carboxylate

Identifiers
CAS Number	1101854-58-3
3D model (JSmol)	Interactive image
ChEBI	CHEBI:95015
ChEMBL	ChEMBL576786
ChemSpider	21467840
PubChem CID	25021165
UNII	7MZ1I2J68A
CompTox Dashboard (EPA)	DTXSID10648437
- InChI: InChI=1S/C27H24N2O9/c30-26(38-21-5-3-20(4-6-21)29(32)33)28-11-9-17(10-12-28)27(31,18-1-7-22-24(13-18)36-15-34-22)19-2-8-23-25(14-19)37-16-35-23/h1-8,13-14,17,31H,9-12,15-16H2 Key: SEGYOKHGGFKMCX-UHFFFAOYSA-N
- SMILES: c1cc(ccc1[N+](=O)[O-])OC(=O)N2CCC(CC2)C(c3ccc4c(c3)OCO4)(c5ccc6c(c5)OCO6)O

Properties
Chemical formula	C_{27}H_{24}N_{2}O_{9}
Molar mass	520.15 g/mol
Appearance	Pale yellow solid
- Except where otherwise noted, data are given for materials in their standard state (at 25 °C [77 °F], 100 kPa). verify (what is ?) Infobox references

JZL184 is an irreversible inhibitor for monoacylglycerol lipase (MAGL), the primary enzyme responsible for degrading the endocannabinoid 2-arachidonoylglycerol (2-AG). It displays high selectivity for MAGL over other brain serine hydrolases, including the anandamide-degrading enzyme fatty acid amide hydrolase (FAAH), thereby making it a useful tool for studying the effects of endogenous 2-AG signaling, in vivo. Administration of JZL184 to mice was reported to cause dramatic elevation of brain 2-AG leading to several cannabinoid-related behavioral effects.

== See also ==
- JZL195
