= Rhc80267 =

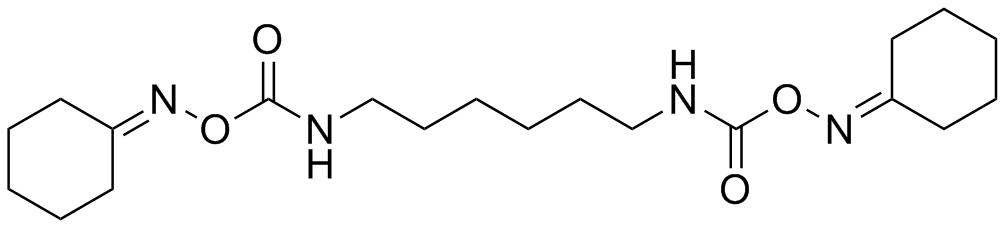

Names
- Preferred IUPAC name N′,N′′′-(Hexane-1,6-diyl)bis(N-cyclohexylidenehydroxylamine-O-carboxamide)
- Other names RHC 80267, RG 80267, U 57908

Identifiers
| CAS Number | 83654-05-1 |
| 3D model (JSmol) | Interactive image |
| ChemSpider | 4887 |
| IUPHAR/BPS | 5255 |
| MeSH | 1,6-bis(cyclohexyloximinocarbonyl)hexane |
| PubChem CID | 5063 |
| UNII | 9VB68H5WIT |
| CompTox Dashboard (EPA) | DTXSID90232494 |
- InChI: InChI=1S/C20H34N4O4/c25-19(27-23-17-11-5-3-6-12-17)21-15-9-1-2-10-16-22-20(26)28-24-18-13-7-4-8-14-18/h1-16H2,(H,21,25)(H,22,26) Key: RXSVYGIGWRDVQC-UHFFFAOYSA-N
- SMILES: C1CCC(=NOC(=O)NCCCCCCNC(=O)ON=C2CCCCC2)CC1

Properties
| Chemical formula | C_{20}H_{34}N_{4}O_{4} |
| Molar mass | 394.26 |
- Except where otherwise noted, data are given for materials in their standard state (at 25 °C [77 °F], 100 kPa). verify (what is ?) Infobox references

RHC80267 is an inhibitor of diacylglycerol lipase. Diacylglycerol lipase generates the endocannabinoid 2-arachidonoylglycerol from diacylglycerol.
