= Triacylglycerol lipase (disambiguation) =

Triacylglycerol lipase can refer to:

- Triacylglycerol lipase
- pancreatic lipase
- gastric lipase
- lingual lipase
