= JZL195 =

Names
- Preferred IUPAC name 4-Nitrophenyl 4-[(3-phenoxyphenyl)methyl]piperazine-1-carboxylate

Identifiers
CAS Number	1210004-12-8
3D model (JSmol)	Interactive image
ChEMBL	ChEMBL606201
ChemSpider	24655100
PubChem CID	46232606
UNII	TP6P2HKJ54
CompTox Dashboard (EPA)	DTXSID401029877
- InChI: InChI=1S/C24H23N3O5/c28-24(32-22-11-9-20(10-12-22)27(29)30)26-15-13-25(14-16-26)18-19-5-4-8-23(17-19)31-21-6-2-1-3-7-21/h1-12,17H,13-16,18H2 Key: QNYRAEKLMNDRFY-UHFFFAOYSA-N
- SMILES: c1ccc(cc1)Oc2cccc(c2)CN3CCN(CC3)C(=O)Oc4ccc(cc4)[N+](=O)[O-]

Properties
Chemical formula	C_{24}H_{23}N_{3}O_{5}
Molar mass	433.464 g·mol^{−1}
- Except where otherwise noted, data are given for materials in their standard state (at 25 °C [77 °F], 100 kPa). Infobox references

JZL195 is a potent inhibitor of both fatty acid amide hydrolase (FAAH) and monoacylglycerol lipase (MAGL), the primary enzymes responsible for degrading the endocannabinoids anandamide (AEA) and 2-arachidonoylglycerol (2-AG), respectively.

== See also ==
- JZL184
- JNJ-42165279
