= LYPLAL1 =

Protein-coding gene in humans

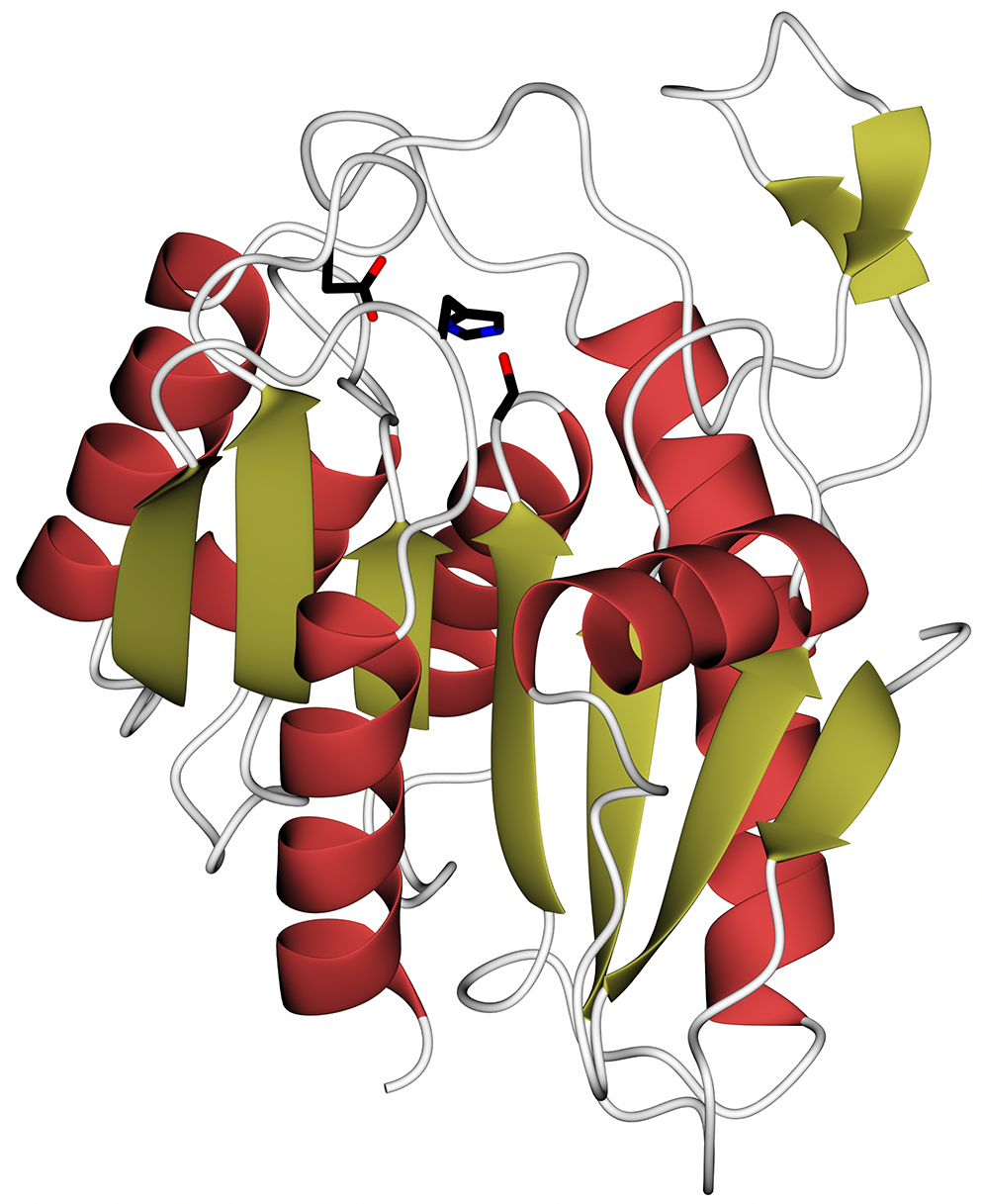
- Crystal structure of human LYPLAL1, PDB code 3u0v. Alpha helices are in red, beta strands in gold, catalytic site residues in black.

Identifiers
- Aliases: LYPLAL1, Q96AV0, lysophospholipase like 1
- External IDs: OMIM: 616548; MGI: 2385115; GeneCards: LYPLAL1
Available structures
PDB	Ortholog search: PDBe RCSB
PDB	List of PDB id codes 3U0V
Enzyme activity
EC #	BRENDA	ExPASy	KEGG	MetaCyc
3.1.2.22	↗	↗	↗	↗

Gene location (Human)
Chr.	Chromosome 1 (human)
Band	1q41	Start	219,173,869 bp
Band	1q41	End	219,212,865 bp

Gene location (Mouse)
Chr.	Chromosome 1 (mouse)
Band	1|1 H5	Start	185,819,928 bp
Band	1|1 H5	End	185,849,507 bp
RNA expression pattern
Bgee	Human / Mouse (ortholog); Top expressed in: myocardium of left ventricle; Achilles tendon; cardiac muscle tissue of right atrium; retinal pigment epithelium; right adrenal cortex; oocyte; body of pancreas; right ventricle; skin of arm; biceps brachii / Top expressed in: right kidney; proximal tubule; primary oocyte; human kidney; islet of Langerhans; endocardial cushion; zygote; lobe of prostate; left lobe of liver; secondary oocyte; More reference expression data
BioGPS	n/a
Gene ontology
Molecular function	lysophospholipase activity; carboxylic ester hydrolase activity; hydrolase activity; palmitoyl-(protein) hydrolase activity
Cellular component	cytoplasm; cytosol
Biological process	protein depalmitoylation; biological process
Sources:Amigo / QuickGO
Orthologs
Databases	NCBI: entry; OMA: entry
Species	Human	Mouse
Entrez	127018	226791
Ensembl	ENSG00000143353	ENSMUSG00000039246
UniProt	Q5VWZ2	Q3UFF7
RefSeq (mRNA)	NM_001300769; NM_001300770; NM_001300771; NM_001300772; NM_138794 NM_001350628; NM_001350629	NM_146106
RefSeq (protein)	NP_001287698; NP_001287699; NP_001287700; NP_001287701; NP_620149 NP_001337557; NP_001337558	NP_666218
Location (UCSC)	Chr 1: 219.17 – 219.21 Mb	Chr 1: 185.82 – 185.85 Mb
PubMed search
- Wikidata
View/Edit Human	View/Edit Mouse

Lysophospholipase-like 1 is a protein in humans that is encoded by the LYPLAL1 gene. The protein is a α/β-hydrolase of uncharacterized metabolic function. Genome-wide association studies in humans have linked the gene to fat distribution and waist-to-hip ratio. The protein's enzymatic function is unclear. LYPLAL1 was reported to act as a triglyceride lipase in adipose tissue and another study suggested that the protein may play a role in the depalmitoylation of calcium-activated potassium channels. However, LYPLAL1 does not depalmitoylate the oncogene Ras and a structural and enzymatic study concluded that LYPLAL1 is generally unable to act as a lipase and is instead an esterase that prefers short-chain substrates, such as acetyl groups. Structural comparisons have suggested that LYPLAL1 might be a protein deacetylase, but this has not been experimentally tested.

== Relationship to acyl-protein thioesterases ==
Sequence conservation and structural homology suggest a close relationship of LYPLAL1 proteins to acyl-protein thioesterases, and, therefore, it has been suggested that LYPLAL1 might be the third human acyl-protein thioesterase. However, the major structural difference between both protein families has been established in the hydrophobic substrate binding tunnel, which has been identified in human acyl-protein thioesterases 1 and 2, as well as in Zea mays acyl-protein thioesterase 2. In LYPLAL1, this tunnel is closed due to a different loop conformation, changing the enzyme's substrate specificity to short acyl chains.

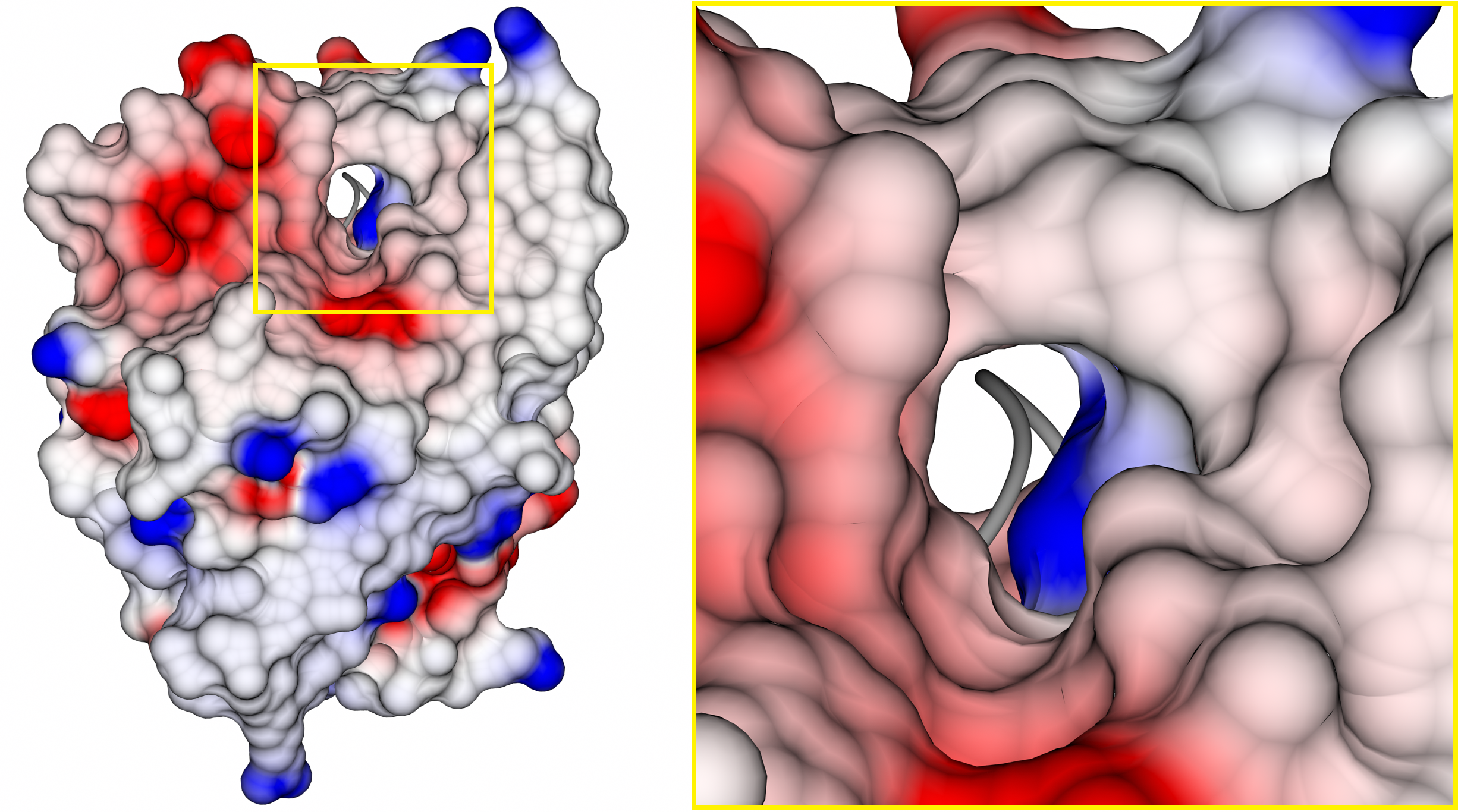
Protein surface of human LYPLAL1 (PDB code 3u0v), showing electrostatic charges (red = negative, blue = positive, white = hydrophobic. On the right, the tunnel-closing loop is shown.
