= ABPP =

ABPP may refer to:

- Activity-based protein profiling, a proteomic technology to monitor enzyme activity
- Agile business process platform, a main product area of i2 Technologies
- American Battlefield Protection Program, a US federal government program under the purview of the National Park Service
- American Board of Professional Psychology
