= Elcubragistat =

Clinical data
- Other names: ABX-1431; ABX1431; Lu-AG06466
- Routes of administration: Oral
- Drug class: Monoacylglycerol lipase (MAGL) inhibitor
- ATC code: None

Identifiers
- IUPAC name: 1,1,1,3,3,3-hexafluoropropan-2-yl 4-[[2-pyrrolidin-1-yl-4-(trifluoromethyl)phenyl]methyl]piperazine-1-carboxylate
- CAS Number: 1446817-84-0
- PubChem CID: 71657619
- IUPHAR/BPS: 10062
- DrugBank: DB16036
- ChemSpider: 61719539
- UNII: FB39E94UXK
- ChEMBL: ChEMBL3945728

Chemical and physical data
- Formula: C_{20}H_{22}F_{9}N_{3}O_{2}
- Molar mass: 507.401 g·mol^{−1}
- 3D model (JSmol): Interactive image
- SMILES: C1CCN(C1)C2=C(C=CC(=C2)C(F)(F)F)CN3CCN(CC3)C(=O)OC(C(F)(F)F)C(F)(F)F
- InChI: InChI=1S/C20H22F9N3O2/c21-18(22,23)14-4-3-13(15(11-14)31-5-1-2-6-31)12-30-7-9-32(10-8-30)17(33)34-16(19(24,25)26)20(27,28)29/h3-4,11,16H,1-2,5-10,12H2; Key:SQZJGTOZFRNWCX-UHFFFAOYSA-N

Elcubragistat (INN; developmental code names ABX-1431, Lu-AG06466) is a monoacylglycerol lipase (MAGL) inhibitor which is or was under development for a variety of indications but has not completed development or been marketed as of 2025. It is taken orally.

== Pharmacology ==
The drug acts as a highly potent and selective MAGL inhibitor and hence increases brain levels of the endocannabinoid 2-arachidonoylglycerol (2-AG) without affecting levels of anandamide. It produces analgesic and other effects in animals.

== Development ==
Elcubragistat is or was under development by Abide Therapeutics, Lundbeck, and the University of Oxford. As of December 2024, no recent development for fibromyalgia, muscle spasticity, neurological disorders, neuropathic pain, non-ulcer dyspepsia, pain, partial epilepsies, post-traumatic stress disorder (PTSD), and an unspecified indication has been reported, whereas development for Tourette's syndrome has been discontinued. The highest developmental stage that the drug has reached is phase 2 clinical trials.
