= URB602 =

Names
- Preferred IUPAC name Cyclohexyl ([1,1′-biphenyl]-3-yl)carbamate
- Other names [1,1′-Biphenyl]-3-yl-carbamic acid, cyclohexyl ester

Identifiers
CAS Number	565460-15-3
3D model (JSmol)	Interactive image
ChEMBL	ChEMBL77767
ChemSpider	9154538
PubChem CID	10979337
UNII	B8371SFA9K
CompTox Dashboard (EPA)	DTXSID90450611
- InChI: InChI=1S/C19H21NO2/c21-19(22-18-12-5-2-6-13-18)20-17-11-7-10-16(14-17)15-8-3-1-4-9-15/h1,3-4,7-11,14,18H,2,5-6,12-13H2,(H,20,21) Key: HHVUFQYJOSFTEH-UHFFFAOYSA-N
- SMILES: O=C(OC1CCCCC1)Nc1cccc(c1)c1ccccc1

Properties
Chemical formula	C_{19}H_{21}NO_{2}
Molar mass	295.382 g·mol^{−1}
Appearance	Crystalline solid
- Except where otherwise noted, data are given for materials in their standard state (at 25 °C [77 °F], 100 kPa). verify (what is ?) Infobox references

URB602 ([1,1'-biphenyl]-3-yl-carbamic acid, cyclohexyl ester) is a compound that has been found to inhibit hydrolysis of monoacyl glycerol compounds, such as 2-arachidonoylglycerol (2-AG) and 2-oleoylglycerol (2-OG). It was first described in 2003. A study performed in 2005 found that the compound had specificity for metabolizing 2-AG over anandamide (another cannabinoid ligand) in rat brain presumably by inhibiting the enzyme monoacylglycerol lipase (MAGL), which is the primary metabolic enzyme of 2-AG. However, subsequent studies have shown that URB602 lacks specificity for MAGL inhibition in vitro.
