= Benjamin Cravatt III =

American chemical biologist

Benjamin F. Cravatt III
- Born: April 13, 1970 (age 56); Houston, Texas, USA
- Education: Stanford University B.S. and B.A. (1992); The Scripps Research Institute Ph.D. (1996)
- Known for: Proteomics
- Scientific career
- Fields: Chemical Biology
- Workplaces: The Scripps Research Institute; Vividion Therapeutics; ActivX Biosciences; Abide Therapeutics
- Doctoral advisors: Dale L. Boger; Richard Lerner

Benjamin Franklin Cravatt III is a professor in the Department of Chemistry at The Scripps Research Institute in La Jolla, California. Considered a co-inventor of activity-based proteomics and a substantial contributor to research on the endocannabinoid system, he is a prominent figure in the field of chemical biology. Cravatt was elected to the National Academy of Sciences in 2014, and the American Academy of Arts and Sciences in 2016. He is Gilula Chair of Chemical Biology, a Cope Scholar, and a Searle Scholar. In 2026, he was elected to the American Philosophical Society.

== Early life and education ==
His father was a dentist and his mother a dental hygienist, both of whom instilled in Cravatt an interest in biology as a child.

Ben Cravatt is left handed.

Cravatt entered Stanford University in 1988, graduating in 1992 with a BS in the Biological Sciences and a BA in History. He then received a PhD in Macromolecular and Cellular Structure and Chemistry from The Scripps Research Institute in 1996, where he worked under the joint supervision of Dale L. Boger and Richard Lerner.

== Research ==
His early contributions to the cannabinoid field include identification and characterization of the endocannabinoid-terminating enzyme fatty acid amide hydrolase (FAAH), as well as the isolation of the novel soporific compound oleamide from cerebrospinal fluid.

Cravatt and colleagues pioneered the activity-based protein profiling (ABPP) chemical proteomic technology, which they used in 2010 to elucidate certain global proteomic features of cysteine proteases. Cravatt's lab has since combined the ABPP technology with metabolomics.

== Awards and professional service ==
Among the awards that Cravatt has received are the TR100 Award in 2002, the Eli Lilly Award in Biological Chemistry in 2004, the ASBMB-Merck Award in 2014 and the Sato Memorial Award in 2015. Cravatt also received an NCI MERIT grant in 2009. In 2022 he was awarded the Wolf Prize in Chemistry.

Cravatt is a co-founder of Vividion Therapeutics, Abide Therapeutics and ActivX Biosciences. He formerly served as an Associate Editor for the Journal of the American Chemical Society and Chemical Science.

== See also ==
- Fatty acid amide hydrolase
- Activity-based protein profiling
- Chemoproteomics
