= ABHD6 =

Protein-coding gene in the species Homo sapiens

Identifiers
- Aliases: ABHD6, abhydrolase domain containing 6, abhydrolase domain containing 6, acylglycerol lipase
- External IDs: OMIM: 616966; MGI: 1913332; GeneCards: ABHD6
Enzyme activity
EC #	BRENDA	ExPASy	KEGG	MetaCyc
3.1.1.23	↗	↗	↗	↗

Gene location (Human)
Chr.	Chromosome 3 (human)
Band	3p14.3	Start	58,237,532 bp
Band	3p14.3	End	58,295,693 bp

Gene location (Mouse)
Chr.	Chromosome 14 (mouse)
Band	14|14 A1	Start	14,413,010 bp
Band	14|14 A1	End	14,466,871 bp
RNA expression pattern
Bgee	Human / Mouse (ortholog); Top expressed in: mucosa of ileum; jejunal mucosa; lateral nuclear group of thalamus; corpus callosum; C1 segment; endothelial cell; cerebellar vermis; right lobe of liver; duodenum; external globus pallidus / Top expressed in: motor neuron; adrenal gland; facial motor nucleus; Rostral migratory stream; anterior horn of spinal cord; duodenum; lateral geniculate nucleus; dentate gyrus of hippocampal formation granule cell; left lobe of liver; pontine nuclei; More reference expression data
BioGPS	n/a
Gene ontology
Molecular function	catalytic activity; hydrolase activity; acylglycerol lipase activity; phospholipase activity
Cellular component	integral component of membrane; plasma membrane; AMPA glutamate receptor complex; membrane; mitochondrion; glutamatergic synapse; GABA-ergic synapse; integral component of postsynaptic membrane; lysosomal membrane; late endosome membrane; lysosome; endosome; mitochondrial membranes
Biological process	acylglycerol catabolic process; negative regulation of cell migration; positive regulation of lipid biosynthetic process; regulation of endocannabinoid signaling pathway; phospholipid catabolic process; long-term depression; negative regulation of cold-induced thermogenesis; monoacylglycerol catabolic process; lysobisphosphatidic acid metabolic process; lipid metabolism
Sources:Amigo / QuickGO
Orthologs
Databases	NCBI: entry; OMA: entry
Species	Human	Mouse
Entrez	57406	66082
Ensembl	ENSG00000163686	ENSMUSG00000025277
UniProt	Q9BV23	Q8R2Y0
RefSeq (mRNA)	NM_020676; NM_001320126	NM_025341; NM_001331064; NM_001331065
RefSeq (protein)	NP_001307055; NP_065727; NP_065727.4; NP_001307055.1	NP_001317993; NP_001317994; NP_079617
Location (UCSC)	Chr 3: 58.24 – 58.3 Mb	Chr 14: 14.41 – 14.47 Mb
PubMed search
- Wikidata
View/Edit Human	View/Edit Mouse

Monoacylglycerol lipase ABHD6, also known as alpha/beta-Hydrolase domain containing 6 (ABHD6), is an enzyme that in humans is encoded by the ABHD6 gene.

== Function ==
ABHD6 is a serine hydrolyzing enzyme that possesses typical α/β-hydrolase family domains. ABHD6 was first studied because of its over-expression in certain forms of tumours.

ABHD6 has been linked to regulation of the endocannabinoid system as it controls the accumulation of 2-arachidonoylglycerol (2-AG) at the cannabinoid receptors.

ABHD6 accounts for about 4% of 2-AG brain hydrolysis. Together, monoacylglycerol lipase (MAGL), ABHD12, and ABHD6 control about 99% of 2-AG signalling in the brain, and each enzyme exhibits a distinct subcellular distribution, suggesting that they regulate distinct pools of 2-AG in the nervous system.

== See also ==
- Fatty acid amide hydrolase
