= ABHD11 =

Protein-coding gene in the species Homo sapiens

Identifiers
- Aliases: ABHD11, WBSCR21, PP1226, abhydrolase domain containing 11
- External IDs: MGI: 1916008; GeneCards: ABHD11
Enzyme activity
EC #	BRENDA	ExPASy	KEGG	MetaCyc
3.1.1.116	↗	↗	↗	↗

Gene location (Human)
Chr.	Chromosome 7 (human)
Band	7q11.23	Start	73,736,094 bp
Band	7q11.23	End	73,738,852 bp

Gene location (Mouse)
Chr.	Chromosome 5 (mouse)
Band	5|5 G2	Start	135,038,006 bp
Band	5|5 G2	End	135,041,029 bp
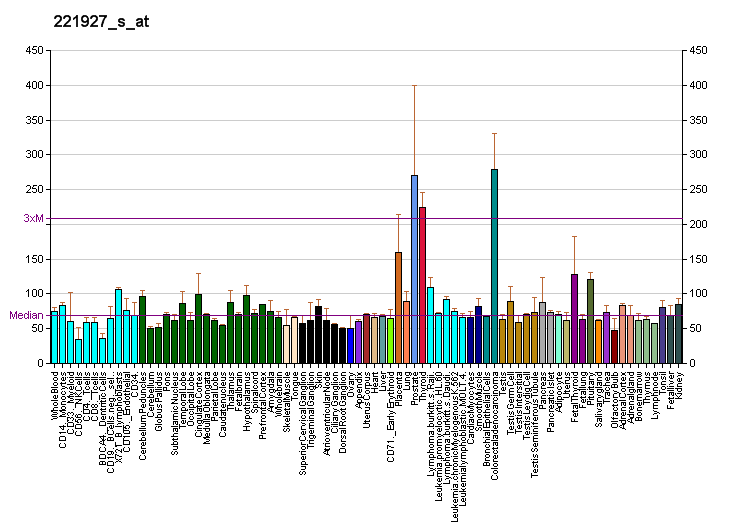
RNA expression pattern
Bgee	Human / Mouse (ortholog); Top expressed in: mucosa of transverse colon; right lobe of thyroid gland; left lobe of thyroid gland; right uterine tube; olfactory zone of nasal mucosa; body of pancreas; rectum; pancreatic ductal cell; minor salivary glands; epithelium of bronchus / Top expressed in: interventricular septum; nasal septum; medial head of gastrocnemius muscle; soleus muscle; quadriceps femoris muscle; lacrimal gland; tibialis anterior muscle; sternocleidomastoid muscle; vastus lateralis muscle; proximal tubule; More reference expression data
BioGPS	More reference expression data
Gene ontology
Molecular function	hydrolase activity; molecular function
Cellular component	cellular component; mitochondrion
Biological process	biological process
Sources:Amigo / QuickGO
Orthologs
Databases	NCBI: entry; OMA: entry
Species	Human	Mouse
Entrez	83451	68758
Ensembl	ENSG00000106077	ENSMUSG00000040532
UniProt	Q8NFV4	Q8K4F5
RefSeq (mRNA)	NM_001145363; NM_001145364; NM_001301058; NM_148912; NM_148913 NM_148914; NM_148916; NM_001321383	NM_001190437; NM_145215
RefSeq (protein)	NP_001138836; NP_001287987; NP_001308311; NP_001308312; NP_683710 NP_683711	NP_001177366; NP_660250
Location (UCSC)	Chr 7: 73.74 – 73.74 Mb	Chr 5: 135.04 – 135.04 Mb
PubMed search
- Wikidata
View/Edit Human	View/Edit Mouse

sn-1-specific diglyceride lipase ABHD11 also known as Williams-Beuren syndrome chromosomal region 21 protein (WBSCR21) is an enzyme that in humans is encoded by the ABHD11 gene, This lipase enzyme is thought to regulate lipid metabolism by controlling the amount of diglyceride inside of cells.

This gene encodes a protein containing an alpha/beta hydrolase fold domain. This gene is deleted in Williams syndrome, a multisystem developmental disorder caused by the deletion of contiguous genes at 7q11.23. Alternatively spliced transcript variants have been described, but their biological validity has not been determined.

== Gene symbol ==
The gene ABHD11 has also been called "Abhydrolase domain-containing 11" ("Alpha/beta hydrolase domain-containing 11") which explains its gene symbol.
