= GPR34 =

Protein-coding gene in humans

Identifiers
- Aliases: GPR34, LYPSR1, G protein-coupled receptor 34
- External IDs: OMIM: 300241; MGI: 1346334; GeneCards: GPR34

Gene location (Human)
Chr.	X chromosome (human)
Band	Xp11.4	Start	41,688,973 bp
Band	Xp11.4	End	41,697,275 bp

Gene location (Mouse)
Chr.	X chromosome (mouse)
Band	X|X A1.1	Start	13,498,328 bp
Band	X|X A1.1	End	13,507,097 bp
RNA expression pattern
Bgee	Human / Mouse (ortholog); Top expressed in: Achilles tendon; smooth muscle tissue; testicle; placenta; mucosa of ileum; right coronary artery; appendix; gallbladder; rectum; monocyte / Top expressed in: lumbar subsegment of spinal cord; stroma of bone marrow; dentate gyrus of hippocampal formation granule cell; mesenteric lymph nodes; Region I of hippocampus proper; superior frontal gyrus; primary visual cortex; spleen; ankle; embryo; More reference expression data
BioGPS	n/a
Gene ontology
Molecular function	G protein-coupled purinergic nucleotide receptor activity; G protein-coupled receptor activity; signal transducer activity
Cellular component	integral component of membrane; plasma membrane; integral component of plasma membrane; membrane
Biological process	G protein-coupled receptor signaling pathway; signal transduction; G protein-coupled purinergic nucleotide receptor signaling pathway
Sources:Amigo / QuickGO
Orthologs
Databases	NCBI: entry; OMA: entry
Species	Human	Mouse
Entrez	2857	23890
Ensembl	ENSG00000171659	ENSMUSG00000040229
UniProt	Q9UPC5	Q9R1K6
RefSeq (mRNA)	NM_001033513; NM_001033514; NM_001097579; NM_005300	NM_011823
RefSeq (protein)	NP_001091048; NP_005291	NP_035953
Location (UCSC)	Chr X: 41.69 – 41.7 Mb	Chr X: 13.5 – 13.51 Mb
PubMed search
- Wikidata
View/Edit Human	View/Edit Mouse

Probable G-protein coupled receptor 34 is a protein that in humans is encoded by the GPR34 gene. The receptor binds to lysophosphatidylserine.

== Function ==
G protein-coupled receptors (GPCRs), such as GPR34, are integral membrane proteins containing 7 putative transmembrane domains (TMs). These proteins mediate signals to the interior of the cell via activation of heterotrimeric G proteins that in turn activate various effector proteins, ultimately resulting in a physiologic response.[supplied by OMIM]
