= URB754 =

Names
- Preferred IUPAC name 6-Methyl-2-(4-methylanilino)-4H-3,1-benzoxazin-4-one

Identifiers
CAS Number	86672-58-4
3D model (JSmol)	Interactive image
ChemSpider	741376
ECHA InfoCard	100.236.075
PubChem CID	848487
UNII	7672NBP7ZF
CompTox Dashboard (EPA)	DTXSID10357239
- InChI: InChI=1S/C16H14N2O2/c1-10-3-6-12(7-4-10)17-16-18-14-8-5-11(2)9-13(14)15(19)20-16/h3-9H,1-2H3,(H,17,18) Key: GFWNGVKCDGYFKG-UHFFFAOYSA-N; InChI=1/C16H14N2O2/c1-10-3-6-12(7-4-10)17-16-18-14-8-5-11(2)9-13(14)15(19)20-16/h3-9H,1-2H3,(H,17,18) Key: GFWNGVKCDGYFKG-UHFFFAOYAI
- SMILES: CC1=CC=C(C=C1)NC2=NC3=C(C=C(C=C3)C)C(=O)O2

Properties
Chemical formula	C_{16}H_{14}N_{2}O_{2}
Molar mass	266.300 g·mol^{−1}
- Except where otherwise noted, data are given for materials in their standard state (at 25 °C [77 °F], 100 kPa). verify (what is ?) Infobox references

URB754 was originally reported by Piomelli et al. to be a potent, noncompetitive inhibitor of monoacylglycerol lipase (MGL). However, recent studies have shown that URB754 failed to inhibit recombinant MGL, and brain FAAH activity was also resistant to URB754. In a later study by Piomelli et al., the MGL-inhibitory activity attributed to URB754 is in fact due to a chemical impurity present in the commercial sample, identified as bis(methylthio)mercurane.
