= ABHD3 =

Protein-coding gene in the species Homo sapiens

Identifiers
- Aliases: ABHD3, LABH3, abhydrolase domain containing 3, abhydrolase domain containing 3, phospholipase
- External IDs: OMIM: 612197; MGI: 2147183; GeneCards: ABHD3
Enzyme activity
EC #	BRENDA	ExPASy	KEGG	MetaCyc
3.1.1.4	↗	↗	↗	↗
3.1.1.32	↗	↗	↗	↗

Gene location (Human)
Chr.	Chromosome 18 (human)
Band	18q11.2	Start	21,650,901 bp
Band	18q11.2	End	21,704,780 bp

Gene location (Mouse)
Chr.	Chromosome 18 (mouse)
Band	18|18 A1	Start	10,642,092 bp
Band	18|18 A1	End	10,706,771 bp
RNA expression pattern
Bgee	Human / Mouse (ortholog); Top expressed in: jejunal mucosa; mucosa of colon; mucosa of sigmoid colon; rectum; mucosa of transverse colon; ventricular zone; monocyte; secondary oocyte; islet of Langerhans; duodenum / Top expressed in: deep cerebellar nuclei; dorsal tegmental nucleus; lobe of cerebellum; medial vestibular nucleus; olfactory epithelium; globus pallidus; cerebellar vermis; epithelium of small intestine; inferior colliculi; ventral tegmental area; More reference expression data
BioGPS	n/a
Gene ontology
Molecular function	1-acyl-2-lysophosphatidylserine acylhydrolase activity; phosphatidylserine 1-acylhydrolase activity; phospholipase A2 activity; carboxylic ester hydrolase activity; hydrolase activity; phospholipase A1 activity; lipase activity; short-chain carboxylesterase activity; acylglycerol lipase activity
Cellular component	integral component of membrane; plasma membrane; membrane; cellular component
Biological process	phosphatidylcholine biosynthetic process; phosphatidylcholine metabolic process; lipid metabolism; cellular lipid metabolic process; medium-chain fatty acid biosynthetic process; medium-chain fatty acid catabolic process
Sources:Amigo / QuickGO
Orthologs
Databases	NCBI: entry; OMA: entry
Species	Human	Mouse
Entrez	171586	106861
Ensembl	ENSG00000158201	ENSMUSG00000002475
UniProt	Q8WU67	Q91ZH7
RefSeq (mRNA)	NM_001308256; NM_001308257; NM_138340	NM_134130
RefSeq (protein)	NP_001295185; NP_001295186; NP_612213	NP_598891
Location (UCSC)	Chr 18: 21.65 – 21.7 Mb	Chr 18: 10.64 – 10.71 Mb
PubMed search
- Wikidata
View/Edit Human	View/Edit Mouse

Alpha/beta hydrolase domain containing 3 (ABHD3; alternative names: lung alpha/beta hydrolase 3, phospholipase ABHD3) is a single pass type II membrane member of the serine hydrolase family of enzymes. The expression of murine ABHD3 is highest in the brain, liver, and kidney. ABHD3 hydrolytic activity is highly specific for medium chain (e.g., dimyristoylphosphatidylcholine) and oxidatively truncated (e.g., azelaoyl PAF) phospholipids. ABHD3-deficient mice are viable, fertile, and possess dramatically elevated medium chain phospholipids in tissues and in blood. Conversely, ectopic expression of ABHD3 prevents the accumulation of oxidized phospholipids in cells.
