= ABHD16A =

Protein-coding gene in the species Homo sapiens

Identifiers
- Aliases: ABHD16A, BAT5, D6S82E, NG26, PP199, abhydrolase domain containing 16A, hBAT5, abhydrolase domain containing 16A, phospholipase, SPG86
- External IDs: OMIM: 142620; MGI: 99476; GeneCards: ABHD16A
Enzyme activity
EC #	BRENDA	ExPASy	KEGG	MetaCyc
3.1.1.23	↗	↗	↗	↗

Gene location (Human)
Chr.	Chromosome 6 (human)
Band	6p21.33	Start	31,686,955 bp
Band	6p21.33	End	31,703,356 bp

Gene location (Mouse)
Chr.	Chromosome 17 (mouse)
Band	17 B1|17 18.59 cM	Start	35,308,239 bp
Band	17 B1|17 18.59 cM	End	35,321,963 bp
RNA expression pattern
Bgee	Human / Mouse (ortholog); Top expressed in: pituitary gland; anterior pituitary; right hemisphere of cerebellum; granulocyte; right lobe of thyroid gland; C1 segment; left testis; right uterine tube; right testis; ganglionic eminence / Top expressed in: cerebellar cortex; perirhinal cortex; lobe of cerebellum; muscle of thigh; entorhinal cortex; choroid plexus of fourth ventricle; vestibular membrane of cochlear duct; motor neuron; cerebellar vermis; olfactory epithelium; More reference expression data
BioGPS	n/a
Gene ontology
Molecular function	protein binding; hydrolase activity; lysophospholipase activity; acylglycerol lipase activity; phospholipase activity
Cellular component	membrane; integral component of membrane
Biological process	monoacylglycerol catabolic process; prostaglandin catabolic process; phosphatidylserine catabolic process; lipid metabolism
Sources:Amigo / QuickGO
Orthologs
Databases	NCBI: entry; OMA: entry
Species	Human	Mouse
Entrez	7920	193742
Ensembl	ENSG00000236063; ENSG00000231488; ENSG00000204427; ENSG00000235676; ENSG00000230475 ENSG00000206403; ENSG00000224552	ENSMUSG00000007036
UniProt	O95870	Q9Z1Q2
RefSeq (mRNA)	NM_001177515; NM_021160	NM_178592
RefSeq (protein)	NP_001170986; NP_066983	NP_848707
Location (UCSC)	Chr 6: 31.69 – 31.7 Mb	Chr 17: 35.31 – 35.32 Mb
PubMed search
- Wikidata
View/Edit Human	View/Edit Mouse

Phosphatidylserine lipase ABHD16A is an enzyme that in humans is encoded by the gene ABHD16A (previously BAT5). This enzyme is a monoglyceride lipase (EC 3.1.1.23), meaning it helps break down monoglyceride into glycerol and a fatty acid, but unlike many conventional lipases, it doesn't act on triglycerides or diglycerides. As its name suggests, it is also predicted to be a phosphatidylserine lipase, meaning it helps convert phosphatidylserine into lysophosphatidylserine (LPS).

A cluster of genes, BAT1-BAT5, has been localized in the vicinity of the genes for TNF alpha and TNF beta. These genes are all within the human major histocompatibility complex class III region. The protein encoded by this gene is thought to be involved in some aspects of immunity.

== Gene ==
Human Bat5 (ABHD16A) is located on chromosome 6. Mice Bat5 (ABHD 16A) is located between TNF and Heat shock protein near the Ck2b protein kinase gene.

BAT5 is highly conserved in human, mice and other mammals. It is found to be expressed in multiple different tissue cells. According to molecular evolutionary genetic analysis, in comparison of 13 mammalian species, it was denoted that the differences in amino acid sequence length are due to splicing in the post transcriptional processing of mRNA.

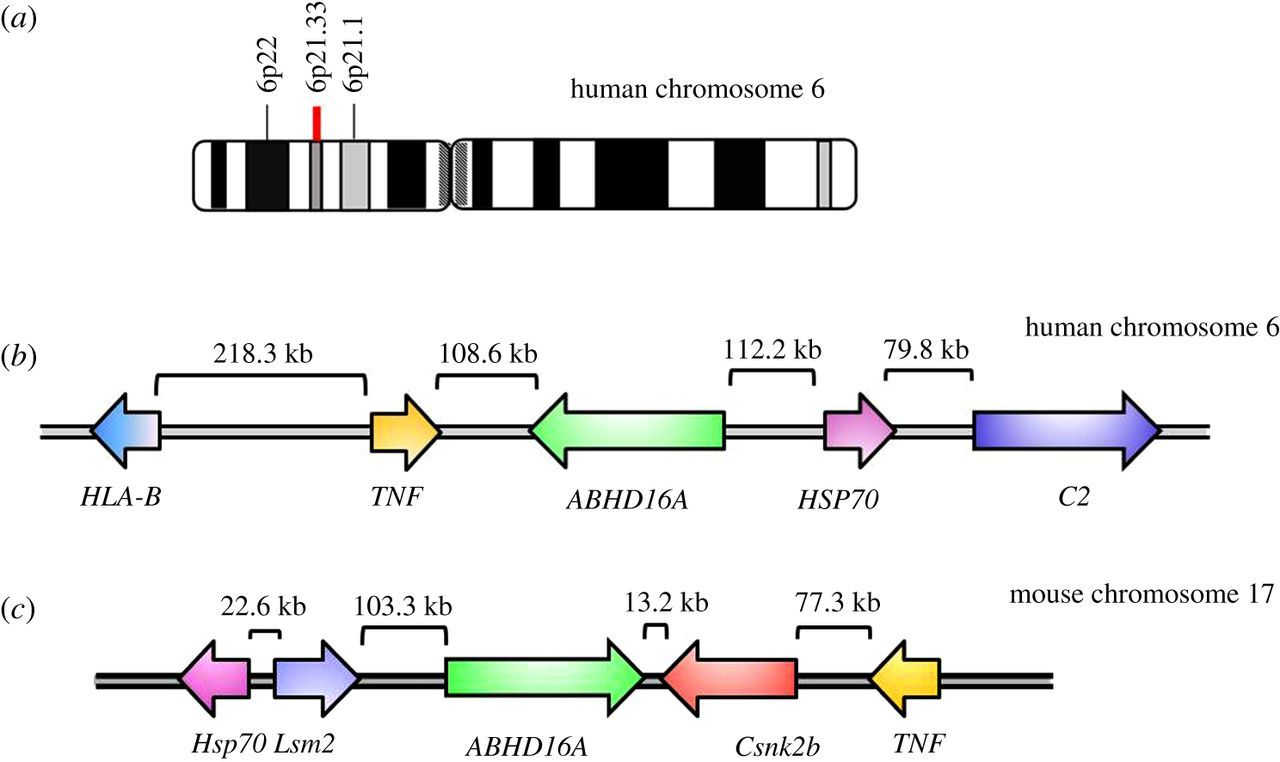
Human chromosome 6 and mouse chromosome 17 BAT5 location

== Structure ==
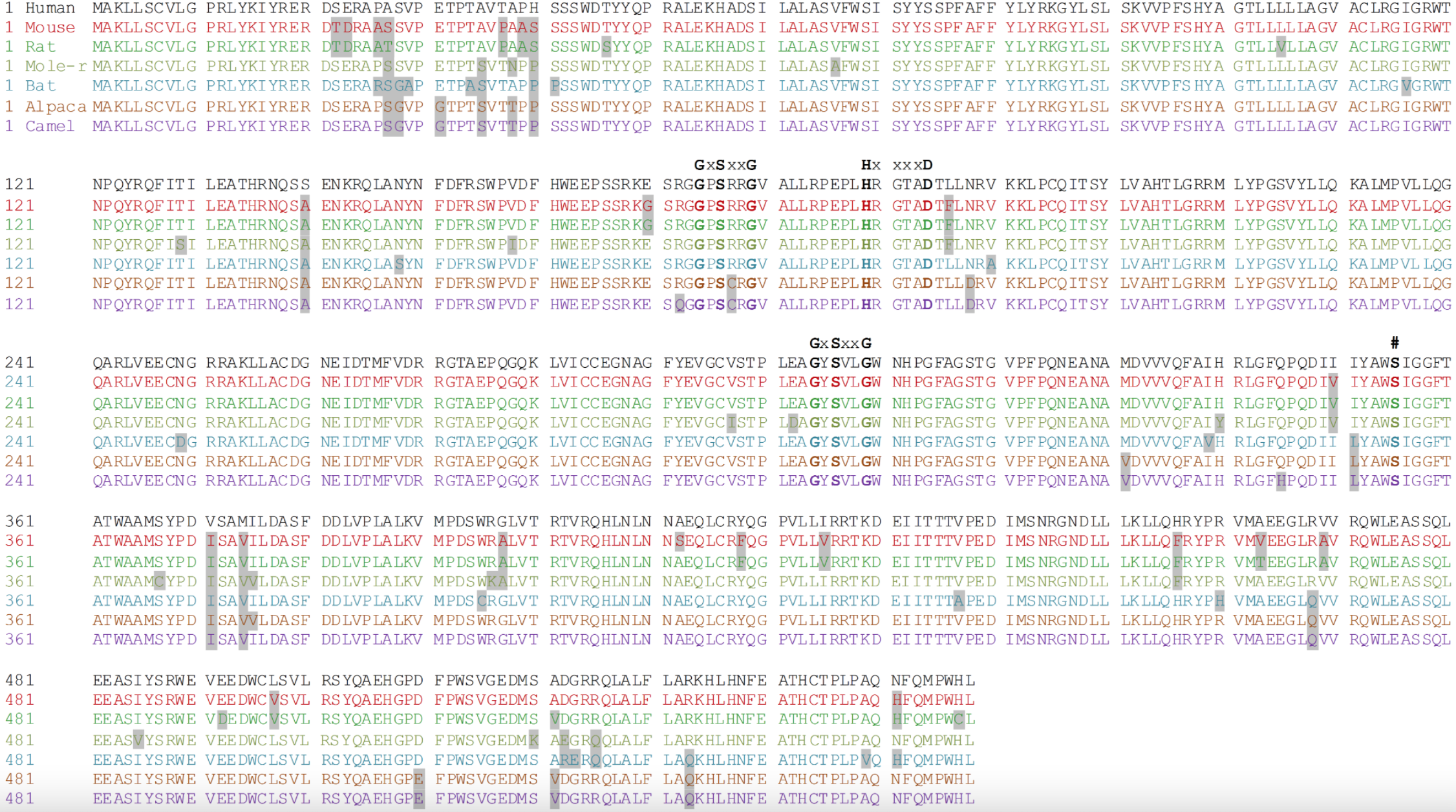
Cross examination of BAT5 amino acid sequence in humans and mice

The human BAT5 protein (also known as ABHD16A) is 558 amino acid residues long. It was first identified in 1992 in the gene domains of TNF alpha and TNF beta. The BAT5 (ABHD 16A) proteins found in different species have varying lengths.

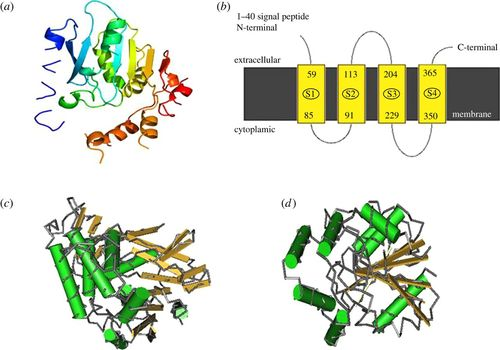
Structural prediction of human BAT5 (ABHD 16A) protein

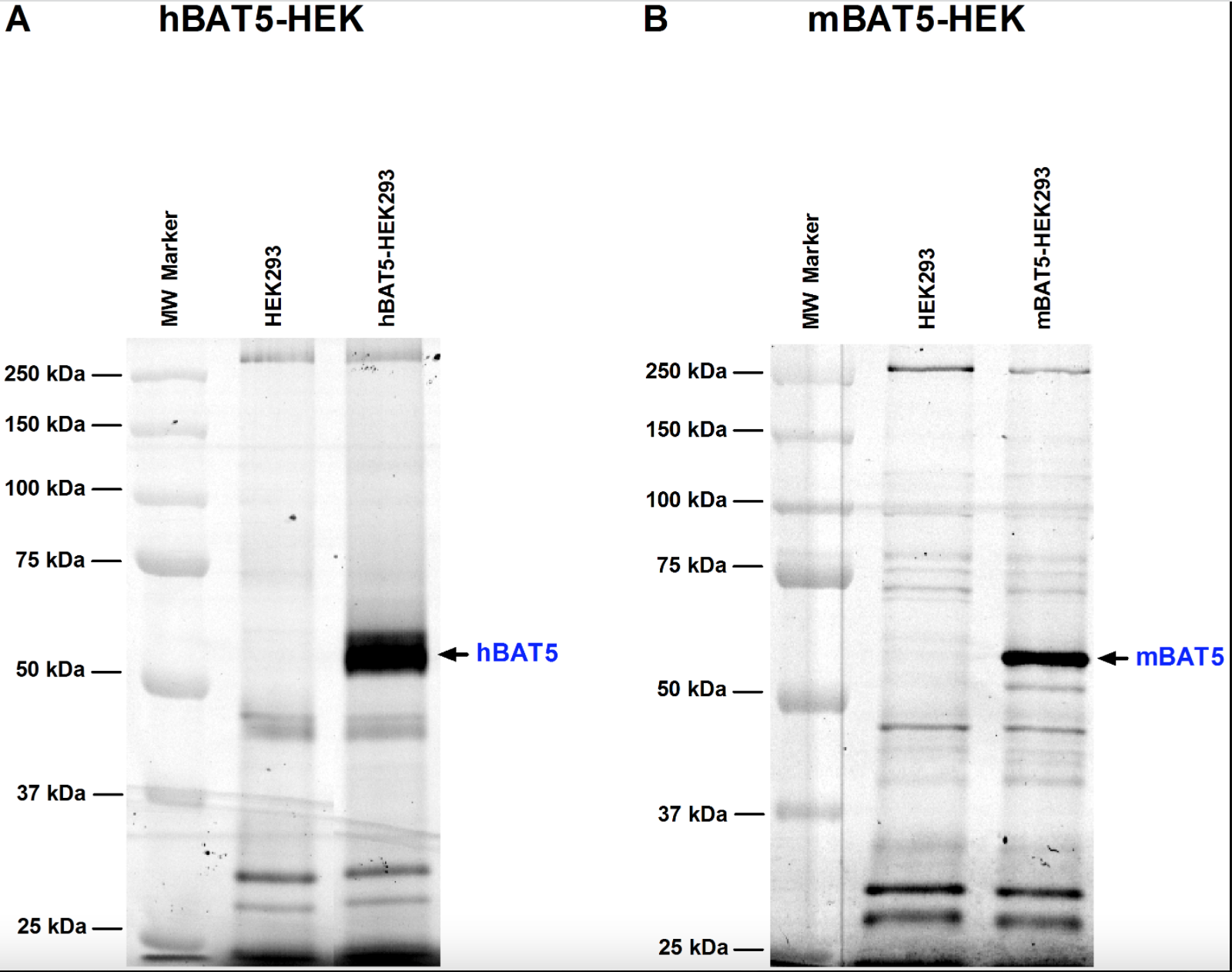
BAT5 molecular weight comparison of humans (H) and mice (m)

BAT5 in humans and mice has been found to be around 63 kDA.

== Research ==
In previous studies, the connection of malformations in the BAT5 (ABHD 16A) protein had yet to be linked to noticeable human diseases. Yet recent studies show that the BAT5 (ABHD 16A) has been linked to neurological, immune regulation, Kawasaki's disease and coronary artery disease.

The BAT5 (ABHD 16A) protein has been found to encode a majority of phosphatidylserine (PS) lipase in the brain. PS lipase synthesizes lysophosphatidylserine which is an important signaling lipid that functions in the mammalian central nervous system. According to a cohort study, relating malformations of the BAT5 (ABHD 16A) protein to human disease, the affected individuals presented with intellectual disability and progressive spasticity of the upper and lower limbs.
