= ABHD18 =

Protein-coding gene in the species Homo sapiens

Identifiers
- Aliases: ABHD18, C4orf29, abhydrolase domain containing 18
- External IDs: MGI: 1915468; GeneCards: ABHD18

Gene location (Human)
Chr.	Chromosome 4 (human)
Band	4q28.2	Start	127,965,306 bp
Band	4q28.2	End	128,039,927 bp

Gene location (Mouse)
Chr.	Chromosome 3 (mouse)
Band	3 B|3	Start	40,846,970 bp
Band	3 B|3	End	40,938,138 bp
RNA expression pattern
Bgee	Human / Mouse (ortholog); Top expressed in: buccal mucosa cell; jejunal mucosa; cerebellar vermis; monocyte; duodenum; Achilles tendon; Skeletal muscle tissue of rectus abdominis; renal medulla; biceps brachii; gonad / Top expressed in: heart; liver; spermatocyte; proximal tubule; spermatid; neural layer of retina; jejunum; right kidney; zygote; muscle tissue; More reference expression data
BioGPS	n/a
Orthologs
Databases	NCBI: entry; OMA: entry
Species	Human	Mouse
Entrez	80167	269423
Ensembl	ENSG00000164074	ENSMUSG00000037818
UniProt	Q0P651	Q8C1A9
RefSeq (mRNA)	NM_001039717; NM_025097; NM_001319305; NM_001319306; NM_001319307 NM_001358451; NM_001358454	NM_026622
RefSeq (protein)	NP_001306234; NP_001306235; NP_001306236; NP_001345380; NP_001345383 NP_001034806; NP_001352966; NP_001352967; NP_001352968; NP_001352969; NP_001352970; NP_001352971; NP_001352972; NP_001352973; NP_001352974; NP_001352975; NP_001352976; NP_001352977; NP_079373	NP_080898; NP_001364039; NP_001364040; NP_001364041
Location (UCSC)	Chr 4: 127.97 – 128.04 Mb	Chr 3: 40.85 – 40.94 Mb
PubMed search
- Wikidata
View/Edit Human	View/Edit Mouse

ABHD18 is a protein that in Homo sapiens is encoded by the ABHD18 gene.

== Gene ==
ABHD18 is found on the positive strand of the human genome at 4q28.2. It is 74.4 kbp. The gene contains 17 exons. The longest mRNA transcript is composed of 13 exons and is 2200 base pairs.

Location of C4orf29 on human chromosome 4

== Homology ==
=== Orthologs ===
Many orthologs to human ABHD18 have been discovered, with the most distant ortholog with high (over 90%) coverage is found in rice Oryza sativa. The protein is not found in fungi. Bacteria of the order Myxobacteria and genus Chitinimonas contain orthologous regions to the C4orf29 protein. The few bacterial homologs indicate a horizontal gene transfer event. The domain of unknown function, DUF2048, is conserved throughout orthologs.

Organism	NCBI Accession Number	Divergence from Humans (Million Years)	Protein Length (Amino Acids)	Sequence identity to Human! !Sequence similarity to Human	
Human	NP_001034806.1	0	414	100%	100%
Dog	XP_005631879.1	94.2	484	87%	89%
Canary	XP_009094557.1	296	414	75%	87%
Painted turtle	XP_005282815.1	296	464	73%	83%
Ant	XP_011141314.1	782	468	46%	64%
Flat Worm	NP_492206.1	937	378	33%	50%
Rice	NP_001046183.1	1369	366	31%	47%
Cystobacter violaceus	WP_043404439.1	2535	321	31%	52%

Tertiary structure of C4orf29

== Protein ==
ABHD18 codes a 414 amino acid sequence of 46.9 kDa in humans. The predicted isoelectric point is 9.37. The domain of unknown function, DUF2048, is found from amino acid residues 25 to 414 in the precursor C4orf29 protein. This domain is part of the alpha/beta hydrolase superfamily, which comprises enzymes that catalyze fat metabolism. Predicted post-translational modifications include glycosylation at residues Ser287 and Ser319 and sumoylation at the motifs Phe240 to Gly243, Ala377 to Asp340, and Phe408 to Gly411.

== Expression ==
The protein product of ABHD18 in humans is predicted to be a secreted product. It is ubiquitously expressed at low to moderate levels. In humans, the protein is found at high levels the digestive tract and parathyroid gland. The homologous mouse protein 3110057O12Rik is expressed at high levels in the granule layer of the cerebellum.

== Clinical significance ==
ABHD18 contains highly variable numbers of Alu repeats. A low number of Alu repeats in the human ABHD18 protein is associated with increase prevalence of hepatocellular carcinoma (HCC) in Asian populations. This information is used as a genetic marker to determine genetic risk of HCC. Swine muscle transcriptome analysis indicates high expression of ABHD18 in swine with extreme low levels of fatty acid composition.
