= GPR174 =

Protein-coding gene in humans

Identifiers
- Aliases: GPR174, GPCR17, LYPSR3, FKSG79, G protein-coupled receptor 174
- External IDs: OMIM: 300903; MGI: 2685222; GeneCards: GPR174

Gene location (Human)
Chr.	X chromosome (human)
Band	Xq21.1	Start	79,144,688 bp
Band	Xq21.1	End	79,175,318 bp

Gene location (Mouse)
Chr.	X chromosome (mouse)
Band	X|X D	Start	106,299,484 bp
Band	X|X D	End	106,340,375 bp
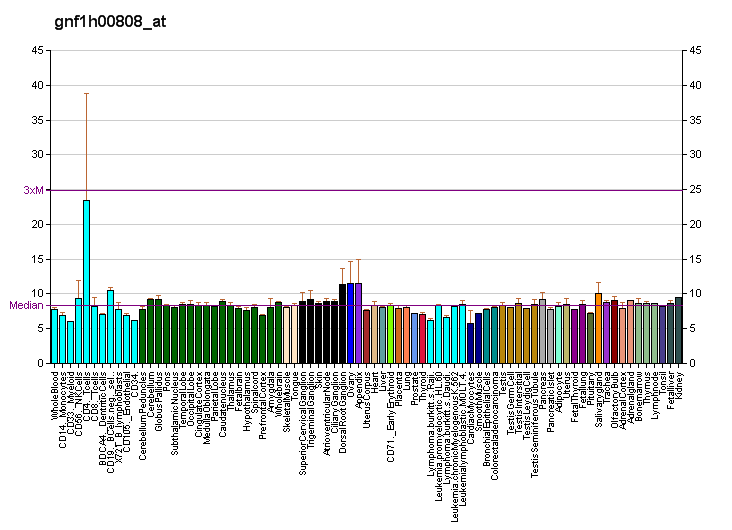
RNA expression pattern
Bgee	Human / Mouse (ortholog); Top expressed in: thymus; mucosa of ileum; lymph node; granulocyte; appendix; epithelium of nasopharynx; epithelium of colon; spleen; superficial temporal artery; blood / Top expressed in: spleen; mesenteric lymph nodes; blood; thymus; lumbar spinal ganglion; subcutaneous adipose tissue; lumbar subsegment of spinal cord; granulocyte; white adipose tissue; dermis; More reference expression data
BioGPS	More reference expression data
Gene ontology
Molecular function	G protein-coupled receptor activity; signal transducer activity; bioactive lipid receptor activity
Cellular component	integral component of membrane; plasma membrane; membrane; integral component of plasma membrane
Biological process	signal transduction; G protein-coupled receptor signaling pathway; positive regulation of Rho protein signal transduction; T cell homeostasis; positive regulation of cytosolic calcium ion concentration involved in phospholipase C-activating G protein-coupled signaling pathway
Sources:Amigo / QuickGO
Orthologs
Databases	NCBI: entry; OMA: entry
Species	Human	Mouse
Entrez	84636	213439
Ensembl	ENSG00000147138	ENSMUSG00000073008
UniProt	Q9BXC1	Q3U507
RefSeq (mRNA)	NM_032553	NM_001033251; NM_001177781; NM_001177782; NM_001358747
RefSeq (protein)	NP_115942	NP_001028423; NP_001171252; NP_001171253; NP_001345676
Location (UCSC)	Chr X: 79.14 – 79.18 Mb	Chr X: 106.3 – 106.34 Mb
PubMed search
- Wikidata
View/Edit Human	View/Edit Mouse

Probable G-protein coupled receptor 174 is a protein that in humans is encoded by the GPR174 gene.

== Ligands ==
Agonists

- GPR174 has been reported to bind to lysophosphatidylserine (LysoPS), and this appears to be the endogenous agonist.

Antagonists

- N-acyl derivatives of LysoPS act as antagonists at GPR174.
