= Activity-based proteomics =

Analytical technique to study proteins

Fluorophosphonate-rhodamine (FP-Rhodamine) activity-based probe for profiling of the serine hydrolase superfamily. In this probe the fluorophosphonate is the reactive group (RG) as it binds irreversibly to the active-site serine nucleophile of serine hydrolases and the tag is rhodamine, a fluorophore for in-gel visualization.

Activity-based proteomics, or activity-based protein profiling (ABPP) is a chemoproteomic strategy that employs modular probes to directly assess the functional state of enzymes within complex proteomes. Unlike expression-based proteomics, which measures protein abundance, ABPP provides information about catalytic activity, thereby enabling researchers to distinguish between active and inactive forms of enzymes. This functional perspective has proven valuable for identifying drug targets, mapping ligandable sites, and understanding enzyme regulation in physiological and pathological contexts. By covalently modifying active sites, activity-based probes (ABPs) allow selective tagging, enrichment, and isolation of proteins, reducing the complexity of proteomic samples and facilitating downstream analysis. ABPP has been applied across diverse biological systems, including cells, tissues, and whole organisms, and has contributed to advances in biomarker discovery, drug development, and in vivo imaging.

== Historical development ==
Early experiments resembling activity-based profiling were conducted in the 1970s, when small molecules were used to study the mechanism of action of the serine-modifying antibiotic penicillin. The modern era of ABPP began in the 1990s with the development of ABPs compatible with proteomic workflows, and the first applications of ABPP were reported during this decade in studies of proteases. In 1999, the Cravatt lab formally introduced the term "activity-based protein profiling," establishing a framework for systematic functional proteomics. Subsequent work by Ben Cravatt at The Scripps Research Institute, Matthew Bogyo at Stanford University, and Herman S. Overkleeft at Leiden University helped define the field through the design of probes targeting serine hydrolases, cysteine proteases, oxidoreductases, human cytochrome P450s and other enzyme families. Since its inception, ABPP has expanded rapidly, with bibliometric analyses documenting exponential growth in publications and widespread adoption across North America, Europe, and Asia. Advances in mass spectrometry and protein separation technologies further accelerated the integration of ABPP into proteomic research, enabling the characterization of enzyme activity on a global scale and establishing ABPP as a cornerstone of functional proteomics.

== Probe design ==
The basic unit of ABPP is the activity-based probe (ABP), which are small-molecule probes engineered to profile enzymatic activities of a range of related enzymes within a complex proteome. Although specific architectures vary, most ABPs share three modular components: (1) a reactive group (RG, sometimes called a "warhead"), (2) a linker or binding element, and (3) a tag used for detection or enrichment. This modularity allows probes to achieve broad yet mechanistically meaningful coverage of an enzyme class while minimizing off-target reactivity.

=== Reactive Group ===
The reactive group, often referred to as the "warhead," covalently binds to conserved residues in enzyme active sites. It is the core determinant of enzyme selectivity. It mediates irreversible or photo-induced covalent attachment to residues located in the active site. Broadly, these fall into two functional classes: Electrophilic warheads and Photoreactive warheads. Electrophilic warheads react with conserved nucleophiles, for example, fluorophosphonates are widely used to target serine hydrolases, while epoxides and vinyl sulfones have been applied to cysteine proteases Photoreactive warheads are used when an enzyme class lacks a catalytic nucleophile, as in the case of metalloproteases or histone deacetylases. These probes incorporate benzophenone or diazirine moieties that, upon UV irradiation, produce radical intermediates that form covalent crosslinks with nearby residues in the enzyme active site.

With classes of enzymes such as the serine hydrolases and metalloproteases that often interact with endogenous inhibitors or that exist as inactive zymogens, ABPP offers a valuable advantage over traditional techniques that rely on abundance rather than activity. Because enzymatic activity is required for productive engagement with the reactive group, inactive precursors and inhibitor-bound enzyme forms typically remain unlabeled. However, because photocrosslinking does not require catalytic turnover, inactive proteases can still be labeled, reducing the intrinsic activity-dependence of photoreactive probes. This limitation has motivated the incorporation of selectivity-enhancing functional groups directly into the probe design. In the case of metalloproteases, active enzymes coordinate a catalytic metal ion. By adding a metal-chelating moiety to the probe scaffold, photoreactive ABPs can be biased toward the catalytically competent, metal-bound form of the enzyme, thereby improving discrimination between active and inactive form. Another major design challenge is achieving sufficient reactivity to label the intended enzyme without indiscriminate modification of unrelated proteins. Strategies such as masked warheads, which become activated only in the presence of a target enzyme, have been developed to improve specificity.

=== Linker ===
Between the reactive group and the tag, ABPs often include a linker / spacer / biorecognition element, which can tune probe solubility, steric accessibility, and substrate mimicry. Simple linkers may consist of alkyl chains or polyethylene glycol (PEG) spacers which adjust hydrophobicity and improve labeling across diverse proteomes. More complex designs incorporate biorecognition elements which can impart enzyme family or subfamily selectivity. For example, substrate-mimetic phosphonates have been used to target specific serine proteases and optimized peptide sequences can discriminate caspase isoforms. Binding or targeting motifs within the linker can further enhance interactions with enzymes whose active sites impose structural constraints, thereby improving probe specificity. In addition, linker length and composition can modulate probe permeability and distribution in cellular or in vivo contexts. This component allows probe designers to balance breadth (profiling an entire enzyme class) versus specificity (targeting individual members).

=== Tag ===
The tag may be either a direct reporter, such as a fluorophore, or an affinity label such as biotin, or it may consist of a latent handle like an alkyne or azide for use with Huisgen 1,3-dipolar cycloaddition (also known as click chemistry). Reporter tags facilitate detection and isolation of labeled proteins. Common examples include fluorophores used for visualization via in-gel fluorescence and high-throughput gel-based screens, biotin for streptavidin-based enrichment followed by mass spectrometry, and isotopic labels for quantitative mass spectrometry. Alternatively, alkynes or azides can be incorporated as bio-orthogonal handles for post-labeling conjugation via click chemistry, enabling modular addition of fluorophores, affinity tags, or isotopic labels after proteome labeling. These "clickable" designs minimize steric hindrance at the active site and expand analytical flexibility, particularly for high-resolution liquid chromatography-mass spectrometry methods.

== Detection methods ==
In-gel ABPP using probes with different fluorophores in the same lane to simultaneously profile differences in enzyme activities

ABPP can be analyzed using several complementary detection strategies, each suited to different experimental contexts. These methods generally visualize or enrich the enzyme-probe adduct, enabling qualitative assessment, quantitative comparison, or protein identification by mass spectrometry.

One of the earliest and most widely used ABPP workflows employs direct visualization on SDS-PAGE gels. Probes with fluorescent reporter tags (e.g. rhodamine) generate distinct bands corresponding to labeled enzymes, allowing rapid assessment of activity across samples or treatment conditions. This approach is commonly used for broad enzyme families such as serine hydrolases or cysteine proteases and is compatible with high-throughput screening for inhibitors. Because the readout is based on in-gel fluorescence rather than protein abundance, gel-based ABPP readily distinguishes active from inactive enzyme species.

However, a significant limitation of gel-based detection is lack of resolving ability, preventing the resolution and identification of low-abundance proteins. In recent years ABPP has been combined with tandem mass spectrometry enabling the identification of hundreds of active enzymes from a single sample. This technique, known as ABPP-MudPIT (multidimensional protein identification technology) is especially useful for profiling inhibitor selectivity as the potency of an inhibitor can be tested against hundreds of targets simultaneously. For proteome-wide analysis, ABPs incorporating affinity tags (e.g. biotin) or clickable handles (azides or alkynes) enable enrichment of labeled enzymes prior to identification by liquid chromatography-tandem mass spectrometry (LC-MS/MS). After covalent labeling in cells or lysates, enzyme-probe adducts are captured using streptavidin or other affinity matrices, washed to remove unlabeled proteins, and digested for MS-based peptide identification. This strategy provides high sensitivity and depth of coverage, which facilitates the discovery of novel enzyme targets, detection of low-abundance enzymes and analysis of complex enzyme families.

To compare enzyme activity across biological conditions, ABPP can be integrated with quantitative proteomic technologies to measure relative enzyme activity across samples. Techniques such as SILAC (Stable Isotope Labeling by Amino acids in Cell culture) incorporate heavy or light isotope-encoded amino acids into cellular proteins, facilitating direct MS-based comparison of probe-labeled peptides from different samples. TMT (Tandem mass tagging) which uses isobaric mass tags allows labeled peptides from multiple samples to be multiplexed and quantified simultaneously. These strategies have been widely applied to assess selectivity of covalent inhibitors and genome-wide changes in enzymatic activity. isoTOP-ABPP (Isotope Tagging of Optimized Probes for Activity-Based Protein Profiling) is a specialized workflow that was developed to address some of the limitations of conventional ABPP, including poor specificity, limited sensitivity, and the absence of selective chemical ligands for many human enzymes. This method uses stable isotopes into probe-derived tags to improve the sensitivity and selectivity of ABPP, while also enabling accurate quantification of protein interactions in complex biological samples.

In addition, fluorescent and photoaffinity probes can be applied in situ or in vivo to visualize enzyme activity within cells, tissues, or whole organisms. These approaches provide spatial information about enzyme function and have been used to study processes such as protease activity in cancer and infection models. Emerging designs aim to enable real-time, non-invasive imaging of enzyme activity in living systems.

== Advantages and limitations ==
A major advantage of ABPP is the ability to monitor the availability of the enzyme active site directly, rather than being limited to protein or mRNA abundance. Ideal ABPs would target a large, but manageable, number of enzymes (tens to hundreds) to provide researchers with a global view of the functional state of the proteome. This degree of target promiscuity must be balanced by minimal cross-reactivity with unrelated proteins. Most ABPs achieve this combination of intraclass coverage and limited extraclass reactivity by coupling appropriate reactive groups with binding elements that recognize conserved mechanistic or structural features within enzyme active sites. Furthermore, ABPP could be used to target specific proteins which were previously viewed as undruggable targets.

A disadvantage of ABPs is that their design is somewhat restricted by the need to attach an electrophile or photocrosslinker, which can limit chemical diversity. Another potential drawback is that covalent modification of the active site irreversibly inhibits the target enzyme. However, in many cases it is possible to use concentrations of ABP such that only a small fraction of the active enzyme pool is labeled, minimizing perturbation of overall enzymatic activity.

== See also ==
- Mass spectrometry
- Proteomics
- Related inhibitors MAFP and DIFP
- Chemoproteomics
- Thermal proteome profiling
