= Protein phosphatase methylesterase-1 =

Enzyme found in humans

PPME1

Identifiers
- Aliases: PPME1, PME-1, protein phosphatase methylesterase 1, ABDH19
- External IDs: OMIM: 611117; MGI: 1919840; GeneCards: PPME1
Available structures
PDB	Ortholog search: PDBe RCSB
PDB	List of PDB id codes 3C5V, 3C5W
Enzyme activity
EC #	BRENDA	ExPASy	KEGG	MetaCyc
3.1.1.89	↗	↗	↗	↗

Gene location (Human)
Chr.	Chromosome 11 (human)
Band	11q13.4	Start	74,171,267 bp
Band	11q13.4	End	74,254,703 bp

Gene location (Mouse)
Chr.	Chromosome 7 (mouse)
Band	7|7 E2	Start	99,975,944 bp
Band	7|7 E2	End	100,021,514 bp
RNA expression pattern
Bgee	Human / Mouse (ortholog); Top expressed in: prefrontal cortex; middle temporal gyrus; Brodmann area 9; cerebellar cortex; cerebellar hemisphere; right frontal lobe; right hemisphere of cerebellum; anterior cingulate cortex; lateral nuclear group of thalamus; superior frontal gyrus / Top expressed in: primary motor cortex; primary visual cortex; superior frontal gyrus; dentate gyrus of hippocampal formation granule cell; cingulate gyrus; medial dorsal nucleus; arcuate nucleus; prefrontal cortex; medial geniculate nucleus; dorsal tegmental nucleus; More reference expression data
BioGPS	n/a
Gene ontology
Molecular function	protein phosphatase 2A binding; protein phosphatase inhibitor activity; protein phosphatase binding; carboxylic ester hydrolase activity; hydrolase activity; protein kinase binding; protein phosphatase regulator activity; cadherin binding; protein C-terminal methylesterase activity; protein methylesterase activity; protein binding
Cellular component	nucleoplasm
Biological process	protein demethylation; G2/M transition of mitotic cell cycle; negative regulation of phosphoprotein phosphatase activity; regulation of phosphoprotein phosphatase activity
Sources:Amigo / QuickGO
Orthologs
Databases	NCBI: entry; OMA: entry
Species	Human	Mouse
Entrez	51400	72590
Ensembl	ENSG00000214517	ENSMUSG00000030718
UniProt	Q9Y570	Q8BVQ5
RefSeq (mRNA)	NM_001271593; NM_016147	NM_028292
RefSeq (protein)	NP_001258522; NP_057231	NP_082568
Location (UCSC)	Chr 11: 74.17 – 74.25 Mb	Chr 7: 99.98 – 100.02 Mb
PubMed search
- Wikidata
View/Edit Human	View/Edit Mouse

Protein phosphatase methylesterase-1

Identifiers
- EC no.: 3.1.1.89

Databases
- BRENDA: enzyme data
- ExPASy: NiceZyme view
- KEGG: enzyme entry
- MetaCyc: metabolic pathway
- Rhea: reactions
- PDB structures: RCSB PDB PDBe PDBsum
Search
- PMC: articles
- PubMed: articles
- NCBI: proteins

Protein phosphatase methylesterase-1 (EC 3.1.1.89), or PME-1, is an enzyme that in humans is encoded by the PPME1 gene. The systematic enzyme name is (phosphatase 2A protein)-leucine ester acylhydrolase, and it catalyses the reaction

[phosphatase 2A protein]-leucine methyl ester + H_{2}O $\rightleftharpoons$ [phosphatase 2A protein]-leucine + methanol

A key regulator of protein phosphatase 2A.
