= Lipase member N =

Enzyme found in humans

LIPN

Identifiers
- Aliases: LIPN, ARCI8, LI4, LIPL4, bA186O14.3, lipase family member N
- External IDs: OMIM: 613924; MGI: 1917416; GeneCards: LIPN
Enzyme activity
EC #	BRENDA	ExPASy	KEGG	MetaCyc
3.1.1.3	↗	↗	↗	↗
3.1.1.13	↗	↗	↗	↗

Gene location (Human)
Chr.	Chromosome 10 (human)
Band	10q23.31	Start	88,759,982 bp
Band	10q23.31	End	88,779,626 bp

Gene location (Mouse)
Chr.	Chromosome 19 (mouse)
Band	19|19 C1	Start	34,044,758 bp
Band	19|19 C1	End	34,062,318 bp
RNA expression pattern
Bgee	Human / Mouse (ortholog); Top expressed in: monocyte; skin of abdomen; blood; skin of leg; granulocyte; testicle; bone marrow; appendix; right lung; bone marrow cell / Top expressed in: lumbar subsegment of spinal cord; lip; esophagus; zone of skin; vastus lateralis muscle; skin of abdomen; lumbar spinal ganglion; spleen; ear; stomach; More reference expression data
BioGPS	n/a
Gene ontology
Molecular function	hydrolase activity; hydrolase activity, acting on ester bonds; lipoprotein lipase activity; lipase activity
Cellular component	extracellular region; intracellular membrane-bounded organelle
Biological process	lipid catabolic process; lipid metabolism; cornification; cellular lipid metabolic process
Sources:Amigo / QuickGO
Orthologs
Databases	NCBI: entry; OMA: entry
Species	Human	Mouse
Entrez	643418	70166
Ensembl	ENSG00000204020	ENSMUSG00000024770
UniProt	Q5VXI9	Q3U4B4
RefSeq (mRNA)	NM_001102469	NM_027340
RefSeq (protein)	NP_001095939	NP_081616
Location (UCSC)	Chr 10: 88.76 – 88.78 Mb	Chr 19: 34.04 – 34.06 Mb
PubMed search
- Wikidata
View/Edit Human	View/Edit Mouse

Lipase member N is an enzyme that in humans is encoded by the LIPN gene.

== Function ==
The gene encodes a lipase that is highly expressed in granular keratinocytes in the epidermis, and plays a role in the differentiation of keratinocytes. Mutations in this gene are associated with lamellar ichthyosis type 4. [provided by RefSeq, Dec 2011].
