= Tetrad test =

Series of behavioral paradigms

The tetrad test is a series of behavioral paradigms in which rodents treated with cannabinoids such as THC show effects. It is widely used for screening drugs that induce cannabinoid receptor-mediated effects in rodents. The four behavioral components of the tetrad are spontaneous activity, catalepsy, hypothermia, and analgesia. Common assays for these behavioral paradigms are as follows:

- Spontaneous activity (or hypomotility) is determined by an open field test, in which a mouse is placed in a cage with perpendicular grid lines, usually spaced by approx. 1 inch. An experimenter counts the number of line crossings by the mouse in a given amount of time.
- Catalepsy is determined by the bar test. The mouse is placed on a bar oriented parallel to and approximately 1 inch off of the ground. If the mouse remains immobile on the bar for typically more than 20 seconds, it is considered cataleptic.
- Hypothermia (reduced body temperature) is determined by using a rectal probe to measure the rectal temperature.
- Analgesia is usually determined by the hot plate or tail immersion test. In the hot plate test, the mouse is placed on a heated plate, typically between 54 and 58°C. An experimenter measures the time it takes for the animal to raise its feet or jump off of the hot plate. In the tail immersion test, the mouse is immobilized and its tail is placed into a warm water bath, typically also between 54 and 58°C. An experimenter measures the time it takes for the mouse to remove its tail from the water bath.

Direct CB1 agonists, such as THC (the psychoactive component of marijuana), or WIN 55,212-2, have effects in all components of the tetrad and induce hypomotility, catalepsy, hypothermia, and analgesia in rodents. Accordingly, all true "tetrad effects" are not observed following treatment with antagonists or inverse agonists of CB1 such as rimonabant. Data have shown, that also CB2 receptors are involved in the tetrad effects induced by cannabinoids, and other, associated with CB1 agonism.
