= Maslinic acid =

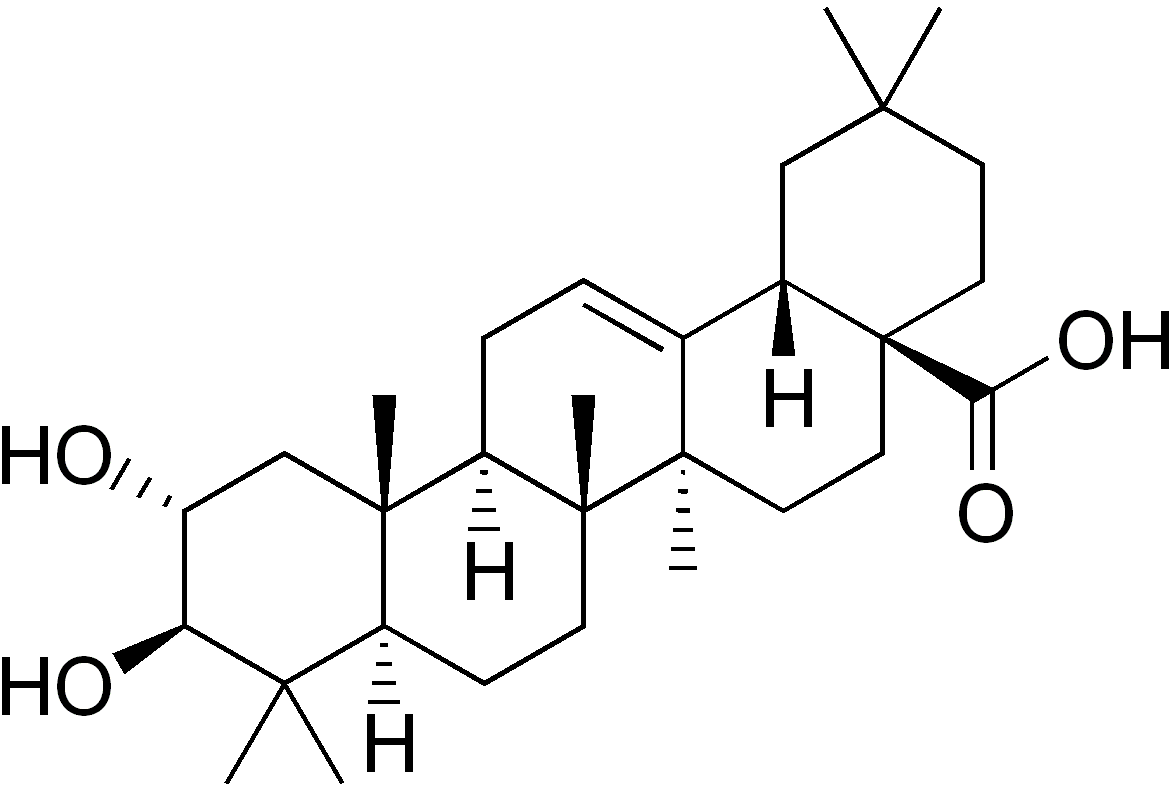

Names
- IUPAC name 2α,3β-Dihydroxyolean-12-en-28-oic acid
- Systematic IUPAC name (4aS,6aS,6bR,8aR,10R,11R,12aR,12bR,14bS)-10,11-Dihydroxy-2,2,6a,6b,9,9,12a-heptamethyl-1,3,4,5,6,6a,6b,7,8,8a,9,10,11,12,12a,12b,13,14b-octadecahydropicene-4a(2H)-carboxylic acid
- Other names Crategolic acid; Masilinic acid; Crataegolic acid

Identifiers
CAS Number	4373-41-5
3D model (JSmol)	Interactive image
ChEBI	CHEBI:66682
ChEMBL	ChEMBL201515
ChemSpider	66312
ECHA InfoCard	100.128.873
KEGG	C16939
PubChem CID	73659
UNII	E233J88OHQ
CompTox Dashboard (EPA)	DTXSID30905074
- InChI: InChI=1S/C30H48O4/c1-25(2)12-14-30(24(33)34)15-13-28(6)18(19(30)16-25)8-9-22-27(5)17-20(31)23(32)26(3,4)21(27)10-11-29(22,28)7/h8,19-23,31-32H,9-17H2,1-7H3,(H,33,34)/t19-,20+,21-,22+,23-,27-,28+,29+,30-/m0/s1 Key: MDZKJHQSJHYOHJ-LLICELPBSA-N
- SMILES: CC1(C)[C@@H](O)[C@H](O)C[C@@]2(C)[C@]([H])1CC[C@]3(C)[C@@]([H])2CC=C4[C@](C)3CC[C@]5([C@](O)=O)[C@]([H])4CC(C)(C)CC5

Properties
Chemical formula	C_{30}H_{48}O_{4}
Molar mass	472.710 g·mol^{−1}
- Except where otherwise noted, data are given for materials in their standard state (at 25 °C [77 °F], 100 kPa). verify (what is ?) Infobox references

Maslinic acid is a compound derived from dry olive-pomace oil (an olive skin wax) which is a byproduct of olive oil extraction. It is a member of the group of triterpenes known as oleananes.

== Pharmacology ==
In vitro study shows that maslinic acid inhibits serine proteases, key enzymes necessary for the spread of HIV within an individual's body. It also has in vitro antiproliferative effects on colon cancer cells. Maslinic acid increases EAAT2 (GLT-1) glutamate reuptake and may reduce glutamatergic toxicity in rats. Additionally, maslinic acid serves as a glycogen phosphorylase inhibitor in mouse liver, as evidenced by increased glycogen accumulation in rainbow trout liver.

== Clinical significance ==
Maslinic acid demonstrates antioxidant capabilities against oxygen and nitrogen reactive species. It also exhibits a suppressive impact on proinflammatory cytokines like TNF-α and IL-6 in murine macrophages. These mechanisms could contribute to enhanced protein synthesis, growth rates, and joint support. Maslinic acid has been shown to improve muscle mass in the elderly when combined with resistance exercise.
