= 3-oxoadipate enol-lactonase =

Class of enzymes

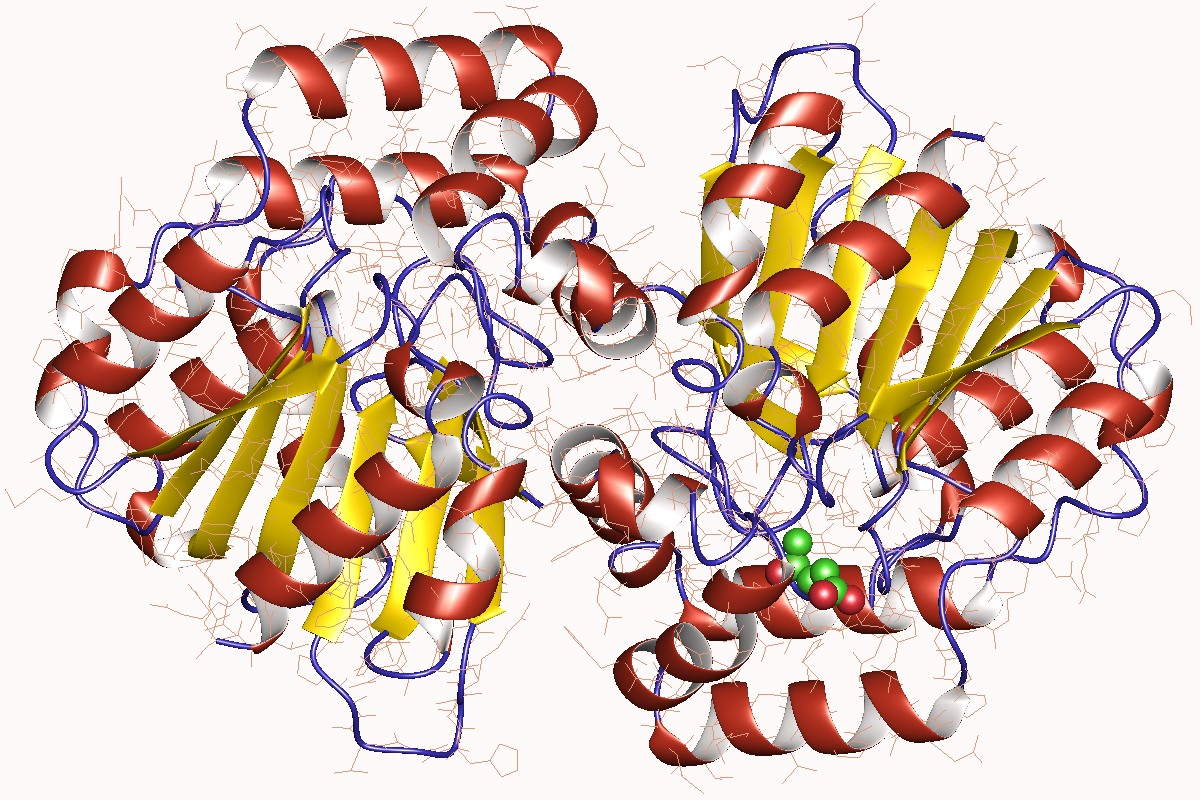
- 3-Oxoadipate enol-lactonase homodimer, Paraburkholderia xenovorans

Identifiers
- EC no.: 3.1.1.24
- CAS no.: 9031-04-3

Databases
- BRENDA: enzyme data
- ExPASy: NiceZyme view
- KEGG: enzyme entry
- MetaCyc: metabolic pathway
- Rhea: reactions
- PDB structures: RCSB PDB PDBe PDBsum
- Gene Ontology: AmiGO / QuickGO
Search
- PMC: articles
- PubMed: articles
- NCBI: proteins

3-oxoadipate enol-lactonase (EC 3.1.1.24) is an enzyme that catalyzes the reaction

β-ketoadipate enol lactone
H_{2}O
β-ketoadipic acid

The enzyme characterised from Pseudomonas putida hydrolyses the enol lactone, 5-oxo-4,5-dihydro-2-furylacetic acid, to β-ketoadipic acid.The reaction is part of a pathway that breaks down the antioxidant, protocatechuic acid, and other aromatic compounds.

This enzyme is a hydrolase, specifically one acting on carboxylic ester bonds. The systematic name is 4-carboxymethylbut-3-en-4-olide enol-lactonohydrolase. Other names in common use include carboxymethylbutenolide lactonase, β-ketoadipic enol-lactone hydrolase, 3-ketoadipate enol-lactonase, 3-oxoadipic enol-lactone hydrolase, and β-ketoadipate enol-lactone hydrolase.
