= Monoacylglycerol lipase =

Protein coding gene in humans

MGLL

Identifiers
- Aliases: MGLL, HU-K5, HUK5, MAGL, MGL, monoglyceride lipase
- External IDs: OMIM: 609699; MGI: 1346042; GeneCards: MGLL
Available structures
PDB	Ortholog search: PDBe RCSB
PDB	List of PDB id codes 3HJU, 3JW8, 3JWE, 3PE6, 4UUQ
Enzyme activity
EC #	BRENDA	ExPASy	KEGG	MetaCyc
3.1.1.23	↗	↗	↗	↗

Gene location (Human)
Chr.	Chromosome 3 (human)
Band	3q21.3	Start	127,689,062 bp
Band	3q21.3	End	128,052,190 bp

Gene location (Mouse)
Chr.	Chromosome 6 (mouse)
Band	6|6 D1	Start	88,724,412 bp
Band	6|6 D1	End	88,828,360 bp
RNA expression pattern
Bgee	Human / Mouse (ortholog); Top expressed in: decidua; mucosa of ileum; mucosa of transverse colon; subcutaneous adipose tissue; apex of heart; right frontal lobe; epithelium of esophagus; endothelial cell; olfactory bulb; pericardium / Top expressed in: iris; ciliary body; lip; skin of external ear; white adipose tissue; brown adipose tissue; subcutaneous adipose tissue; lactiferous gland; submandibular gland; gastrula; More reference expression data
BioGPS	n/a
Gene ontology
Molecular function	protein homodimerization activity; carboxylic ester hydrolase activity; acylglycerol lipase activity; lysophospholipase activity; hydrolase activity; protein binding
Cellular component	cytoplasm; cytosol; endoplasmic reticulum membrane; membrane; plasma membrane; nucleoplasm; extrinsic component of membrane
Biological process	regulation of sensory perception of pain; lipid metabolism; regulation of endocannabinoid signaling pathway; fatty acid metabolic process; lipid catabolic process; fatty acid biosynthetic process; regulation of signal transduction; regulation of inflammatory response; acylglycerol catabolic process; inflammatory response; arachidonic acid metabolic process; acylglycerol acyl-chain remodeling; triglyceride catabolic process; monoacylglycerol catabolic process
Sources:Amigo / QuickGO
Orthologs
Databases	NCBI: entry; OMA: entry
Species	Human	Mouse
Entrez	11343	23945
Ensembl	ENSG00000074416	ENSMUSG00000033174
UniProt	Q99685	O35678
RefSeq (mRNA)	NM_001003794; NM_001256585; NM_007283	NM_001166249; NM_001166250; NM_001166251; NM_011844
RefSeq (protein)	NP_001003794; NP_001243514; NP_009214	NP_001159721; NP_001159722; NP_001159723; NP_035974
Location (UCSC)	Chr 3: 127.69 – 128.05 Mb	Chr 6: 88.72 – 88.83 Mb
PubMed search
- Wikidata
View/Edit Human	View/Edit Mouse

Monoacylglycerol lipase (MAGL), also called monoglyceride lipase (MGL) or acylglycerol lipase, is an enzyme that in humans is encoded by the MGLL gene. More broadly, this term can also refer to the class of enzymes with systematic name glycerol-ester acylhydrolase (EC 3.1.1.23) that catalyze the same reaction, including other enzymes like ABHD2 and ABHD6. MAGL is a 33-kDa, membrane-associated member of the serine hydrolase superfamily and contains the classical GXSXG consensus sequence common to most serine hydrolases. The catalytic triad has been identified as Ser122, His269, and Asp239.

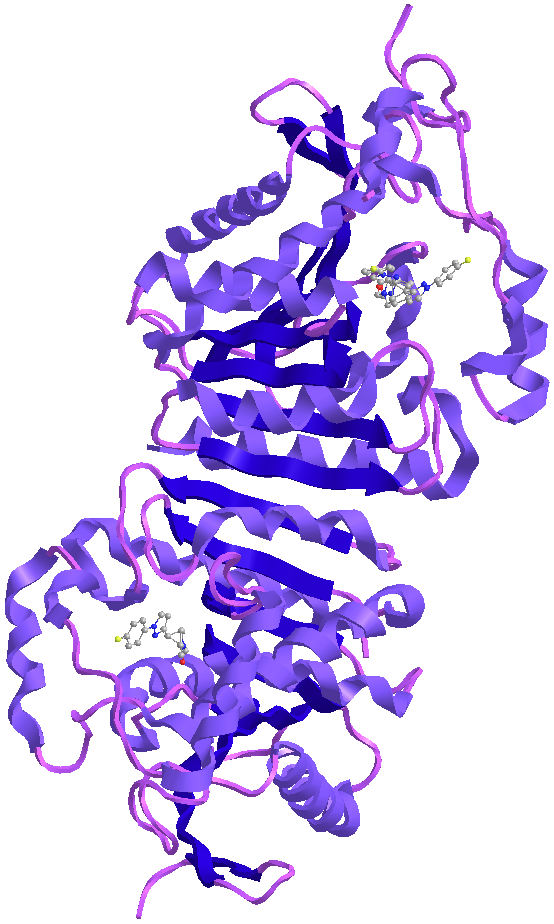
Human monoacylglycerol lipase

== Function ==
Monoacylglycerol lipase catalyzes a reaction that uses water molecules to break (hydrolysis) the glycerol monoesters of long-chain fatty acids.

It functions together with hormone-sensitive lipase (LIPE) to hydrolyze intracellular triglyceride stores in adipocytes and other cells to fatty acids and glycerol. MGLL may also complement lipoprotein lipase (LPL) in completing hydrolysis of monoglycerides resulting from degradation of lipoprotein triglycerides.

Monoacylglycerol lipase is a key enzyme in the hydrolysis of the endocannabinoid 2-arachidonoylglycerol (2-AG). It converts monoacylglycerols to the free fatty acid and glycerol. The contribution of MAGL to total brain 2-AG hydrolysis activity has been estimated to be ~85% (ABHD6 and ABHD12 are responsible for ~4% and ~9%, respectively, of the remainder), and this in vitro estimate has been confirmed in vivo by the selective MAGL inhibitor JZL184. Chronic inactivation of MAGL results in massive (>10-fold) elevations of brain 2-AG in mice, along with marked compensatory downregulation of CB_{1} receptors in selective brain areas.

== Inhibitors ==
MAGL enzyme inhibitors, for instance URB-602, URB-754, and JZL-184, produce cannabinoid-like behavioral effects in mice.

Further examples include:

- KML-29
- JZL-195 – dual MAGL and FAAH inhibitor
- JW-642

As well as the following compounds which are under pharmaceutical development:

- Elcubragistat (ABX-1431; Lu AG06466)
- Irafamdastat (BMS-986368; CC-97489) – dual MAGL and FAAH inhibitor
- PF-06818883
- RG-6182
- Small molecule MGLLi

== See also ==
- Endocannabinoid enhancer
- Endocannabinoid reuptake inhibitor
- Triacylglycerol lipase
- Fatty acid amide hydrolase
