= Lingual lipase =

Protein found in mice and rats

- Lingual lipase with catalytic triad highlighted in center

Identifiers
- Organism: Rat
- Symbol: Lipf
- Orthologs: OMA: entry
- UniProt: P04634

Other data
- EC number: 3.1.1.3
Search for
- Structures: Swiss-model
- Domains: InterPro

Lingual lipase is an enzyme found in the saliva of mice and rats that helps break down fats (in particular triglycerides). The existence and significance of an analogous enzyme in the saliva of humans and other animals remains the topic of scholarly debate. In mice and rats, lingual lipase is encoded by the gene Lipf. In humans, the corresponding gene, LIPF, encodes the enzyme gastric lipase, which is secreted by gastric chief cells in the stomach.

Lingual lipase is a member of a family of digestive enzymes called triacylglycerol lipases, EC 3.1.1.3, that use the catalytic triad of aspartate, histidine, and serine to hydrolyze medium and long-chain triglycerides into partial glycerides and free fatty acids. The enzyme, released into the mouth along with the saliva, catalyzes the first reaction in the digestion of dietary lipid, with diglycerides being the primary reaction product. However, due to the unique characteristics of lingual lipase, including a pH optimum 4.5–5.4 and its ability to catalyze reactions without bile salts, the lipolytic activity continues through to the stomach. Enzyme release is signaled by the autonomic nervous system after ingestion, at which time the serous glands under the circumvallate and foliate papillae on the surface of the tongue secrete lingual lipase into the grooves of the papillae, co-localized with fat taste receptors. The hydrolysis of the dietary fats is essential for fat absorption by the small intestine, as long chain triacylglycerides cannot be absorbed, and as much as 30% of fat is hydrolyzed within 1 to 20 minutes of ingestion by lingual lipase alone.

== Proposed mechanism ==
Lingual lipase uses a catalytic triad consisting of aspartic acid-203 (Asp), histidine-257 (His), and serine-144 (Ser), to initiate the hydrolysis of a triglyceride into a diacylglyceride and a free fatty acid. First, there is a series of deprotonations that make the serine a better nucleophile. The lone pair on the oxygen of the serine then undergoes a nucleophilic addition to either the first or the third carbonyl of the triacylglycerol. Next, the electrons that had moved to form the carbonyl transfer back down to reform the carbonyl. Then the diacylglycerol leaving group is protonated by His-257. Following another round of deprotonations, the lone pair on the oxygen of water undergoes a nucleophilic addition to the carbonyl that reformed in the previous step. The electrons that had moved up from the carbonyl come back down to reform it and kick off the Ser, which again induces the chain of deprotonation. The final products of the reaction are the conserved catalytic triad, a diacylglycerol and a free fatty acid. Monoacylglyceride is also present in a lower concentration and is produced following a second round of hydrolysis by the same mechanism. It acts on tryglicerides to help breakdown food as a part of saliva composition.

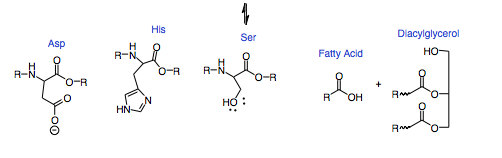

== Cystic fibrosis ==
People with cystic fibrosis (CF) have an 85% chance of additionally experiencing the effects of exocrine pancreatic insufficiency. In the most extreme cases, no pancreatic lipase is produced, yet even when the enzyme is completely absent, dietary fat is still absorbed. Studies have shown that in these cases non-pancreatic acidic lipases contribute to greater than 90% of total lipase activity in the duodenum. In humans, this is primarily done by gastric lipase, though it was sometimes erroneously assumed to be lingual lipase in older studies.
