= Triacylglycerol lipase =

Enzyme catalyst

Identifiers
- EC no.: 3.1.1.3
- CAS no.: 9001-62-1

Databases
- BRENDA: enzyme data
- ExPASy: NiceZyme view
- KEGG: enzyme entry
- MetaCyc: metabolic pathway
- Rhea: reactions
- PDB structures: RCSB PDB PDBe PDBsum
Search
- PMC: articles
- PubMed: articles
- NCBI: proteins

Lipase (class 3)
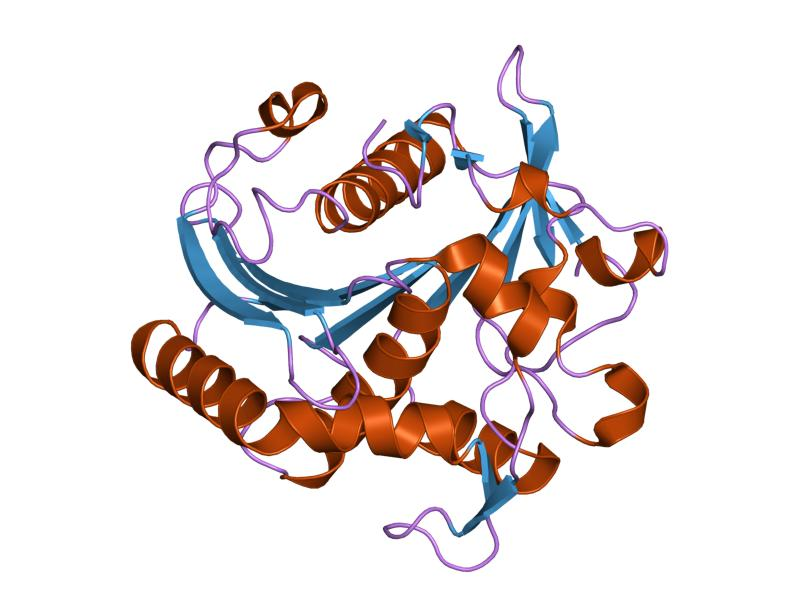
- Structure of Triacyl-glycerol acylhydrolase.

Identifiers
- Symbol: Lipase_3
- Pfam: PF01764
- InterPro: IPR002921
- PROSITE: PDOC00110
- SCOP2: 3tgl / SCOPe / SUPFAM
- OPM superfamily: 127
- OPM protein: 3tgl
- CDD: cd00519
Available protein structures:
- PDB: IPR002921 PF01764 (ECOD; PDBsum)
- AlphaFold: IPR002921; PF01764

The enzyme triacylglycerol lipase (also triglyceride lipase, EC 3.1.1.3;systematic name triacylglycerol acylhydrolase) catalyses the hydrolysis of ester linkages of triglycerides:

triacylglycerol + H_{2}O ⇌ diacylglycerol + a carboxylate

These lipases are widely distributed in animals, plants and prokaryotes. This family was also called class 3 lipases as they are only distantly related to other lipase families.

== Human proteins containing this domain ==
DAGLA; DAGLB; LOC221955; The pancreatic enzyme acts only on an ester-water interface.

== Nomenclature ==
Other names include lipase, butyrinase, tributyrinase, Tween hydrolase, steapsin, triacetinase, tributyrin esterase, Tweenase, amno N-AP, Takedo 1969-4-9, Meito MY 30, Tweenesterase, GA 56, capalase L, triglyceride hydrolase, triolein hydrolase, tween-hydrolyzing esterase, amano CE, cacordase, triglyceridase, triacylglycerol ester hydrolase, amano P, amano AP, PPL, glycerol-ester hydrolase, GEH, meito Sangyo OF lipase, hepatic lipase, lipazin, post-heparin plasma protamine-resistant lipase, salt-resistant post-heparin lipase, heparin releasable hepatic lipase, amano CES, amano B, tributyrase, triglyceride lipase, liver lipase, hepatic monoacylglycerol acyltransferase).

== See also ==
- Pancreatic lipase
- Gastric lipase
- Lingual lipase
