= Lysophosphatidylserine =

Class of chemical compounds

A lysophosphatidylserine is a lysophospholipid. Various lysophosphatidylserines trigger TLR 2. They can also modulate T cell function via suppression of Interleukin_2 (IL-2) production in CD4 T cells. They can also trigger mast cell degranulation. They interact with three G protein-coupled receptors (GPCRs), LPS1/GPR34, LPS2/P2Y10, and LPS3/GPR174.

A recent study showed that lysophosphatidylserines do not stimulate normal leukocytes. They also enhances glucose transport, lowering blood glucose levels while leaving secretion of insulin unaffected.
