= Diacylglycerol lipase =

Enzyme that breaks down diacylglycerol

diacylglycerol lipase α
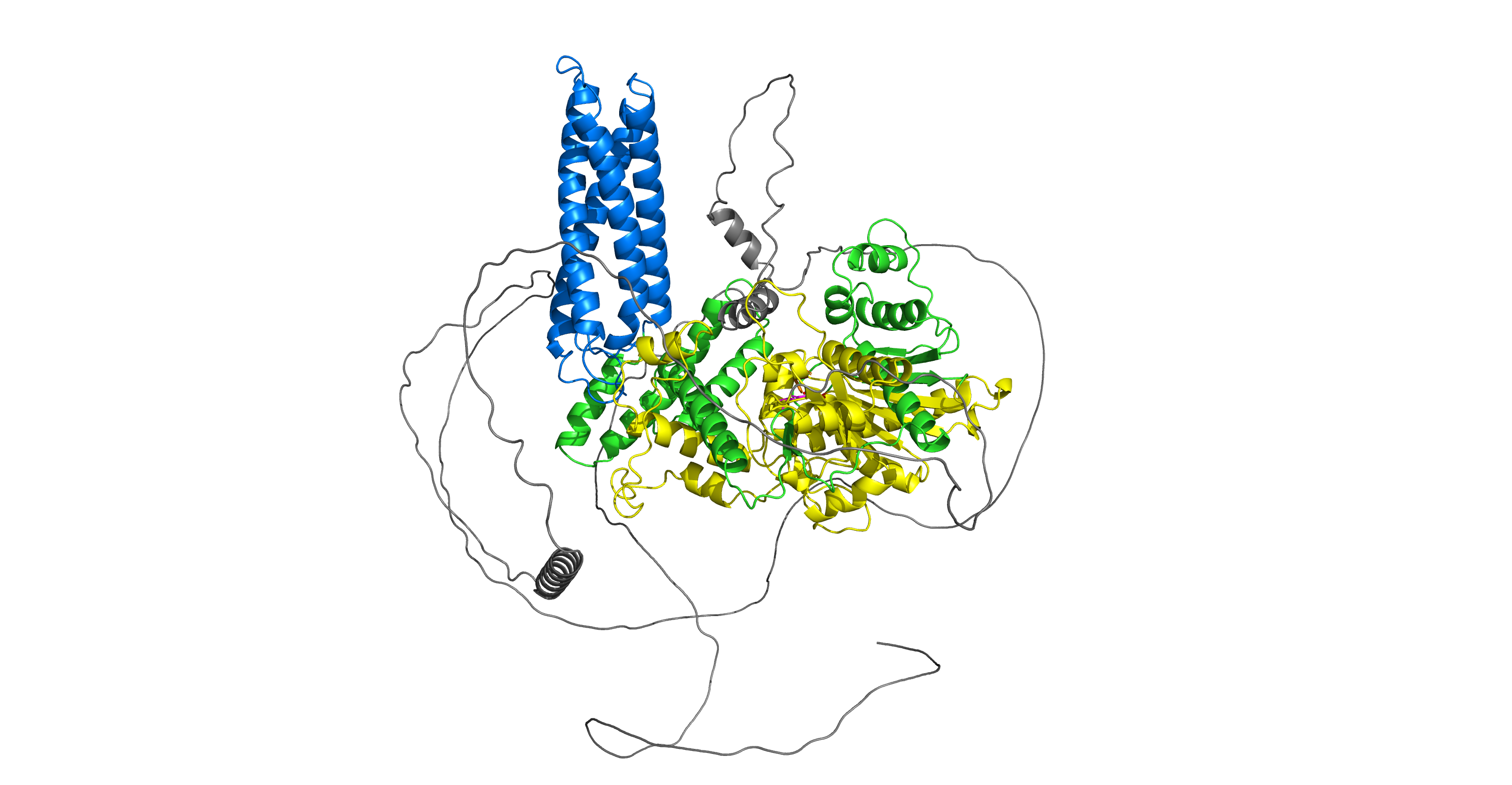
- DAGLα structure, folded with AlphaFold. Transmembrane domain in marine blue. Catalytic domain in yellow. C-terminal tail in gray. See Structure for details. Click image for higher resolution.

Identifiers
- Symbol: DAGLA
- Alt. symbols: C11orf11
- NCBI gene: 747
- HGNC: 1165
- RefSeq: NM_006133
- UniProt: Q9Y4D2

Other data
- EC number: 3.1.1.116
- Locus: Chr. 11 q12.3
Search for
- Structures: Swiss-model
- Domains: InterPro

diacylglycerol lipase β
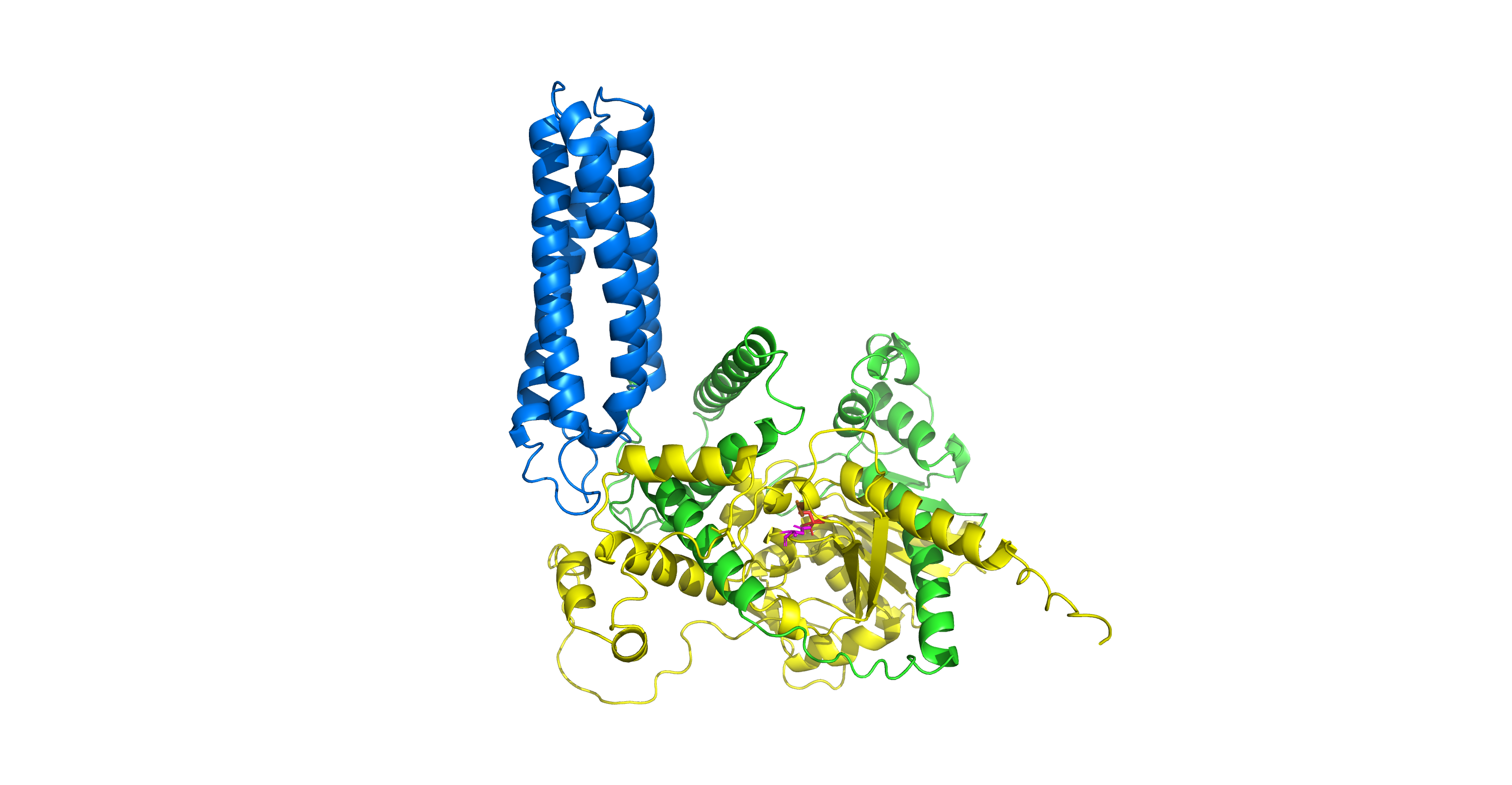
- DAGLβ structure, folded with AlphaFold. Transmembrane domain in marine blue. Catalytic domain in yellow. Note missing C-terminal tail. See Structure for details. Click image for higher resolution.

Identifiers
- Symbol: DAGLB
- NCBI gene: 221955
- HGNC: 28923
- RefSeq: NM_139179
- UniProt: Q8NCG7

Other data
- EC number: 3.1.1.116
- Locus: Chr. 7 p22.1
Search for
- Structures: Swiss-model
- Domains: InterPro

Diacylglycerol lipase (EC 3.1.1.116), also known as DAG lipase, DAGL, or DGL, is an enzyme that catalyzes the hydrolysis of diacylglycerol, releasing a free fatty acid and monoacylglycerol:

diacylglycerol + H_{2}O ⇌ monoacylglycerol + free fatty acid

DAGL has been studied in multiple domains of life, including bacteria, fungi, plants, insects, and mammals. By searching with BLAST for the previously sequenced microorganism DAGL, Bisogno et al discovered two distinct mammalian isoforms, designated DAGLα (DAGLA) and DAGLβ (DAGLB). Most animal DAGL enzymes cluster into the DAGLα and DAGLβ isoforms.

Mammalian DAGL is a crucial enzyme in the biosynthesis of 2-arachidonoylglycerol (2-AG), the most abundant endocannabinoid in tissues. The endocannabinoid system has been identified to have considerable involvement in the regulation of homeostasis and disease. As a result, much effort has been made toward investigating the mechanisms of action and the therapeutic potential of the system's receptors, endogenous ligands, and enzymes like DAGLα and DAGLβ.

== Structure ==
While both DAGLα and DAGLβ are extensively homologous (sharing 34% of their sequence), DAGLα (1042 amino acids) is much larger than DAGLβ (672 amino acids) due to the presence of a sizeable C-terminal tail in the former.

Both DAGLα and DAGLβ have a transmembrane domain at the N-terminal that starts with a conserved 19 amino acid cytoplasmic sequence followed by four transmembrane helices. These transmembrane helices are connected by three short loops, of which the two extracellular loops may be glycosylated.

The catalytic domain of both isoforms is an α/β hydrolase domain which consists of 8 core β sheets that are mutually hydrogen-bonded and variously linked by α helices, β sheets, and loops. The hydrophobic active site presents a highly conserved Serine-Aspartate-Histidine catalytic triad. The serine and aspartate residues of the active site were first identified in DAGLα as Ser-472 and Asp-524, and in DAGLβ as Ser-443 and Asp-495. The histidine residue was later identified in DAGLα as His-650, which aligns with His-639 in DAGLβ.

Between β strands 7 and 8 is a 50-60 residue regulatory loop that is believed to act as a well-positioned "lid" controlling access to the catalytic site. Numerous phosphorylation sites have been identified on this loop as evidence of its regulatory nature.

== Mechanism ==
Diacylglycerol lipase uses a Serine-Aspartate-Histidine catalytic triad to hydrolyze the ester bond of an acyl chain from diacylglycerol (DAG), generating a monoacylglycerol (MAG), and a free fatty acid. This hydrolytic cleavage mechanism for DAGLα and DAGLβ is more selective for the sn-1 position of DAG over the sn-2 position.

Initially, histidine deprotonates serine forming a strong nucleophilic alkoxide, which attacks the carbonyl of the acyl group at the sn-1 position of DAG. A tetrahedral intermediate briefly forms before the instability of the oxyanion collapses the tetrahedral intermediate to re-form the double bond while cleaving the ester bond. The monoacylglycerol product, which in this case is 2-arachidonoylglycerol, is released leaving behind an acyl-enzyme intermediate.

An incoming water molecule is deprotonated, and the hydroxide ion attacks the ester linkage generating a second tetrahedral intermediate. The instability of the negative charge once again collapses the tetrahedral intermediate, this time displacing the serine. The second product (a fatty acid) is released from the catalytic site.

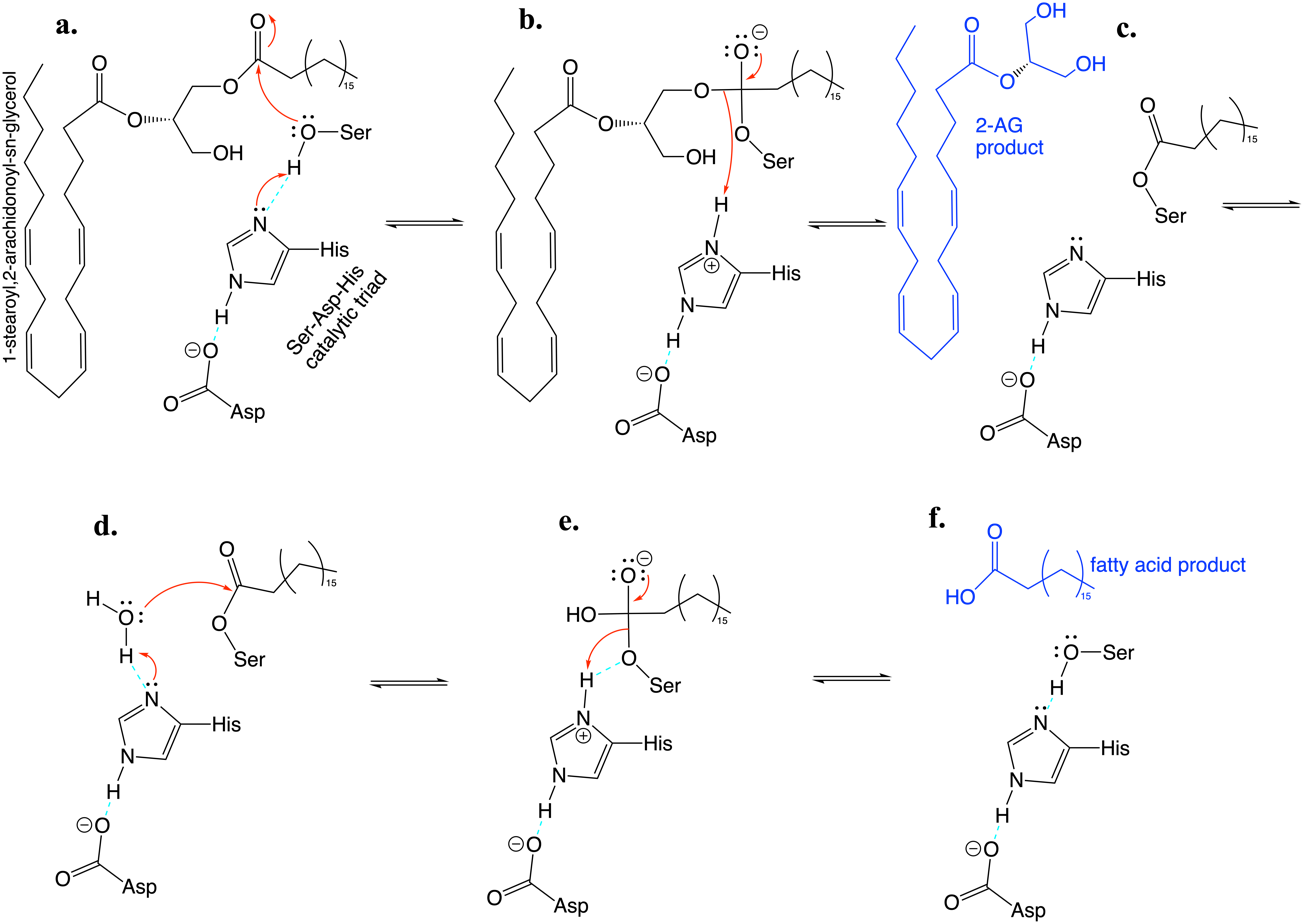
Diacylglycerol lipase mechanism. Products are shown in blue. Intermolecular interactions are shown in cyan. Arrow-pushing is shown in red.

== Biological function ==
DAGLα and DAGLβ have been identified as the enzymes predominantly responsible for the biosynthesis of the endogenous signaling lipid, 2-arachidonoylglycerol (2-AG). 2-AG is the most abundant endocannabinoid found in tissues and activates the CB1 and CB2 G-protein-coupled receptors. Endocannabinoid signaling via these receptors is involved in core body temperature control, inflammation, appetite promotion, memory formation, mood and anxiety regulation, pain relief, addiction reward, neuron protection, and more.

Studies utilizing DAGL α or β knockout mice show that these enzymes regulate 2-AG production in a tissue-dependent manner. DAGLα is prevalent in central nervous tissues where it is primarily responsible for the on-demand production of 2-AG, which is involved in retrograde synaptic suppression, regulation of axonal growth, adult neurogenesis, and neuroinflammation.

DAGLβ has enriched activity in innate immune cells such as macrophages and microglia enabling regulation of 2-AG and downstream metabolic products (e.g. prostaglandins) important for proinflammatory signaling in neuroinflammation and pain.

== Disease relevance ==
Diacylglycerol lipase has been identified as a tunable target in the endocannabinoid system. It has been the subject of extensive preclinical research, and many propose that disease states, including inflammatory disease, neurodegeneration, pain, and metabolic disorders may benefit from drug discovery. However currently, the conversion of these preclinical findings into viable approved therapeutics for disease remains elusive.

Inhibiting DAGLα in the gastrointestinal tract has been shown to reduce constipation in mice through a CB1-dependent pathway.

DAGLα inhibition in mice has also been shown to reduce neuroinflammatory response due to the reduction of overall 2-AG, a precursor to the synthesis of proinflammatory prostaglandins. Therefore DAGLα inhibition has been identified as an approach to treating neurodegenerative diseases. Indeed, rat models of Huntington's disease show the neuroprotective nature of DAGLα inhibition.

DAGLα inhibition in mice produced weight loss through a reduction in food intake. Moreover, DAGLα knockout mice have low fasting insulin, triglycerides, and total cholesterol. Thus, DAGLα inhibition may be a novel therapy for treating obesity and metabolic syndrome.

However, DAGLα inhibition has also been associated reduction in neuroplasticity, increased anxiety and depression, seizures, and other neuropsychiatric side effects due to drastic alteration of brain lipids.

In vivo experiments show that selectively inhibiting DAGLβ has the potential to be a powerful anti-inflammatory therapy by suppressing the production of the proinflammatory molecules arachidonic acid, prostaglandins, tumor necrosis factor α in macrophages and dendritic cells. As a consequence, DAGLβ inhibition has been identified as a potential therapy for pathological pain that does not impair immunity.
