= Serine hydrolase =

Serine hydrolases are one of the largest known enzyme classes comprising approximately ~200 enzymes or 1% of the genes in the human proteome. A defining characteristic of these enzymes is the presence of a particular serine at the active site, which is used for the hydrolysis of substrates. The hydrolysis of the ester or peptide bond proceeds in two steps. First, the acyl part of the substrate (the acid part of an ester or the part of a peptide ending in a carboxyl group) is transferred to the serine, making a new ester or amide bond and releasing the other part of the substrate (the alcohol of an ester or the part of the peptide ending in an amino group) is released. Later, in a slower step, the bond between the serine and the acyl group is hydrolyzed by water or hydroxide ion, regenerating free enzyme. Unlike other, non-catalytic, serines, the reactive serine of these hydrolases is typically activated by a proton relay involving a catalytic triad consisting of the serine, an acidic residue (e.g. aspartate or glutamate) and a basic residue (usually histidine), although variations on this mechanism exist.

Superfamilies of serine hydrolases includes:

- Serine proteases, including trypsin, chymotrypsin, and subtilisin
- Extracellular lipases, including pancreatic lipase, hepatic lipase, gastric lipase, endothelial lipase, and lipoprotein lipase
- Intracellular lipases, including hormone sensitive lipase, monoacylglycerol lipase, adipose triglyceride lipase, and diacylglycerol lipase
- Cholinesterases, including acetylcholinesterase and butyrylcholinesterase
- Small molecule thioesterases, including fatty acid synthase and the acyl-CoA thioesterases
- Some phospholipases, including phospholipase A2 and platelet activating factor acetylhydrolase
- Protein and glycan hydrolases, including protein phosphate methylesterase 1, acyloxyacyl hydrolase and sialic acid acetylesterase
- Some amidases, including fatty acid amide hydrolase
- Some peptidases, including dipeptidyl peptidase 4, fibroblast activation protein, and prolylendopeptidase

== See also ==
- Activity-based proteomics
- Alpha/beta hydrolase fold
- Amide
- Enzyme
- Ester
- List of enzymes
- Thioester
