= 2-Arachidonoylglycerol =

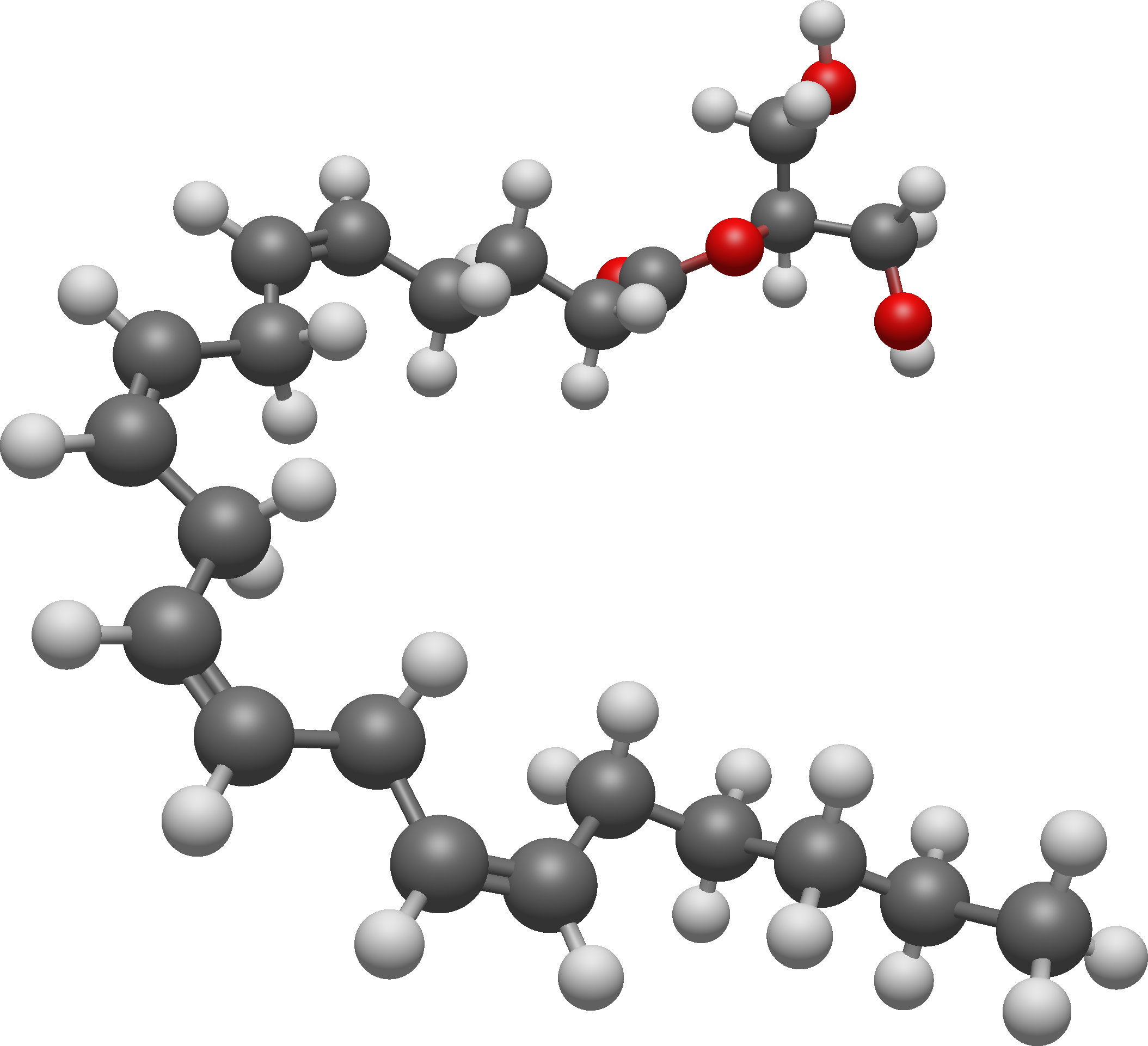

Names
- IUPAC name 2-O-[(5Z,8Z,11Z,14Z)-Icosa-5,8,11,14-tetraenoyl]glycerol
- Systematic IUPAC name 1,3-Dihydroxypropan-2-yl (5Z,8Z,11Z,14Z)-icosa-5,8,11,14-tetraenoate
- Other names 2-AG, 2-arachidonoylglycerol

Identifiers
CAS Number	53847-30-6
3D model (JSmol)	Interactive image
ChEBI	CHEBI:52392
ChEMBL	ChEMBL122972
ChemSpider	4445451
IUPHAR/BPS	729
PubChem CID	5282280
UNII	8D239QDW64
CompTox Dashboard (EPA)	DTXSID001017454
- InChI: InChI=1S/C23H38O4/c1-2-3-4-5-6-7-8-9-10-11-12-13-14-15-16-17-18-19-23(26)27-22(20-24)21-25/h6-7,9-10,12-13,15-16,22,24-25H,2-5,8,11,14,17-21H2,1H3/b7-6-,10-9-,13-12-,16-15- Key: RCRCTBLIHCHWDZ-DOFZRALJSA-N; InChI=1/C23H38O4/c1-2-3-4-5-6-7-8-9-10-11-12-13-14-15-16-17-18-19-23(26)27-22(20-24)21-25/h6-7,9-10,12-13,15-16,22,24-25H,2-5,8,11,14,17-21H2,1H3/b7-6-,10-9-,13-12-,16-15- Key: RCRCTBLIHCHWDZ-DOFZRALJBN
- SMILES: O=C(OC(CO)CO)CCC\C=C/C\C=C/C\C=C/C\C=C/CCCCC

Properties
Chemical formula	C_{23}H_{38}O_{4}
Molar mass	378.3 g/mol
- Except where otherwise noted, data are given for materials in their standard state (at 25 °C [77 °F], 100 kPa). verify (what is ?) Infobox references

2-Arachidonoylglycerol (2-AG) is an endocannabinoid, an endogenous agonist of the CB_{1} receptor and the primary endogenous ligand for the CB2 receptor. It is an ester formed from the omega-6 fatty acid arachidonic acid and glycerol. It is present at relatively high levels in the central nervous system, with cannabinoid neuromodulatory effects. It has been found in bovine and human milk. The chemical was first described in 1994–1995, although it had been discovered some time before that. The activities of phospholipase C (PLC) and diacylglycerol lipase (DAGL) mediate its formation. 2-AG is synthesized from arachidonic acid-containing diacylglycerol (DAG).

== Occurrence ==
2-AG, unlike anandamide (another endocannabinoid), is present at relatively high levels in the central nervous system; it is the most abundant molecular species of monoacylglycerol found in mouse and rat brain (~5–10 nmol/g tissue). Detection of 2-AG in brain tissue is complicated by the relative ease of its isomerization to 1-AG during standard lipid extraction conditions. It has been found in bovine as well as human milk.

== Discovery ==
2-AG was discovered by Raphael Mechoulam and his student Shimon Ben-Shabat. 2-AG was a known chemical compound but its occurrence in mammals and its affinity for the cannabinoid receptors were first described in 1994–1995. A research group at Teikyo University reported the affinity of 2-AG for the cannabinoid receptors in 1994–1995, but the isolation of 2-AG in the canine gut was first reported in 1995 by the research group of Raphael Mechoulam at the Hebrew University of Jerusalem, which additionally characterized its pharmacological properties in vivo. 2-Arachidonoylglycerol, next with Anandamide, was the second endocannabinoid discovered. The cannabinoid established the existence of a cannabinoid neuromodulatory system in the nervous system.

== Pharmacology ==
Unlike anandamide, formation of 2-AG is calcium-dependent and is mediated by the activities of phospholipase C (PLC) and diacylglycerol lipase (DAGL). 2-AG acts as a full agonist at the CB1 receptor. At a concentration of 0.3 nM, 2-AG induces a rapid, transient increase in intracellular free calcium in NG108-15 neuroblastoma X glioma cells through a CB1 receptor-dependent mechanism. 2-AG is hydrolyzed in vitro by monoacylglycerol lipase (MAGL), fatty acid amide hydrolase (FAAH), and the uncharacterized serine hydrolase enzymes ABHD2, ABHD6 and ABHD12. The exact contribution of each of these enzymes to the termination of 2-AG signaling in vivo is unknown, though it is estimated that MAGL is responsible for ~85% of this activity in the brain. There have been identified transport proteins for 2-arachidonoylglycerol and anandamide. These include the heat shock proteins (Hsp70s) and fatty acid binding proteins (FABPs).

== Biosynthesis ==
2-Arachidonoylglycerol is synthesized from arachidonic acid-containing diacylglycerol (DAG), which is derived from the increase of inositol phospholipid metabolism by the action of diacylglycerol lipase. The molecule can also be formed from pathways like the hydrolysis derived (by diglyceride) from both phosphatidylcholine (PC) and phosphatidic acid (PAs) by the action of DAG lipase and the hydrolysis of arachidonic acid-containing lysophosphatidic acid by the action of a phosphatase.

== See also ==
- 2-Arachidonoyl glyceryl ether
- Endocannabinoid transporters
