= Transient neonatal myasthenia gravis =

- Specialty: Pediatrics, Pediatric neurology, Pediatric pulmonology, Pediatric intensive care medicine
- Symptoms: skeletal muscles weaknesses and, in rare cases. organ deformities in one or more areas of the body in fetuses and newborns
- Complications: Myasthenic crisis, i.e., weakness in the lungs skeletal muscles causing potentially lethal respiratory failure
- Usual onset: During fetal development
- Duration: Most cases remit by 4 months after birth
- Causes: Antibodies against proteins in the neuromuscular junction of skeletal muscles made by a mother with myasthenia gravis and passed from her blood to her fetus's blood
- Diagnostic method: Classic symptoms of transient neonatal myasthenia gravies in the offspring of mothers who have myasthenia gravis
- Differential diagnosis: Juvenile myasthenia gravis, congenital myasthenia gravis
- Frequency: Rare

Transient neonatal myasthenia gravis, i.e., TNMG (also termed neonatal myasthenia gravis), and its more severe form, fetal acetylcholine receptor inactivation syndrome (i.e., FARIS), is one of the various types of myasthenia gravis (i.e., MG). MG is an autoimmune disease in which individuals form antibodies that circulate in their blood, enter tissues, bind to certain proteins in the neuromuscular junctions of skeletal muscles, and thereby reduce the number or ability of these skeletal muscles to contract when appropriately stimulated by acetylcholine. The affected skeletal muscles are easily fatigable, i.e., weakened after relatively little use. There are at least 3 types of antibodies that are known to cause the non-FARIS form of TNMG: antibodies binding to the adult form of the nicotinic acetylcholine receptor, i.e., adult nAChR, are responsible for most cases of non-FARIS MG while antibodies binding to two proteins near these nAChRs, i.e., the MuSK protein and low-density lipoprotein receptor-related protein 4 (i.e., LRP4) are responsible for many of the remaining non-FARIS TNMG cases. Studies suggest that antibodies directed against another protein near the nAChRs receptor, i.e., agrin, may be responsible for rare cases of non-FARIS MG. Antibodies directed at the fetal form of nAChRs are responsible for all cases of the FARIS form of TNMT.

MG may present as muscle weakness in different areas of the body: a) ocular MG is skeletal muscle weakness in the eyes that causes ptosis (i.e., eyelid drooping), weak eyelid closure, strabismus (i.e., one eye turned in a direction different from the other eye), diplopia (i.e., double vision), and/or complex ophthalmoplegias (e.g., weakness or paralysis of one or more extraocular muscles responsible for eye movements); b) limb/axial MG is skeletal muscle weakness of the arms, legs, trunk, and/or head that causes weak finger extension, wrist drop, foot and hand dorsiflexions (backward bending or contraction of the foot or hand), difficulty in raising the arms above the head, getting up from low seats or toilets, walking long distances, climbing stairs, and head drop (i.e., relaxing of the neck muscles); and c) bulbar MG is weakness of the skeletal muscles activated by nerves from the lower part of the brain stem termed the medulla oblongata that causes slurred speech, dysphagia (i.e., difficulty in swallowing), dysphonia (i.e., hoarse voice), bilateral facial nerve weakness, jaw weakness, and weaknesses of the respiratory muscles that may lead to a myasthenic crisis, i.e., life-threatening respiratory arrest. MG, particularly in long-standing cases, may have two or all three ocular, limb/axial, or bulbar symptoms. MG has also been separated into only two types: ocular MG and generalized MG, i.e., all other types of MG. MG is caused by antibodies directed at adult nAChR (70-85% of cases), the MUSK protein (1-10 % of cases), or the LRP4 protein (1% to 5% of cases). Uncommonly, individuals present with the symptoms of MG but test negative for antibodies to the nAChR, MuSK, and LRP4 protein, i.e., they have triple seronegative MG. This may be due to laboratory test inaccuracies, decreased antibody production, immunosenescence, previous immunosuppressive therapies, acquired immunodeficiencies, depletion of the antigen attacked by the MG-causing antibody, or other diseases that mimic MG. It is also possible that other proteins found to be elevated in some cases of MG or an as yet unidentified protein will be found to cause MG.

TNMG is one form of pediatric myasthenia gravis. Pediatric myasthenia gravis has two other forms which should not be confused with TNMG. Juvenile myasthenia gravis (i.e., JMG) refers to cases of MG that occur in children before the age of 19. It has been diagnosed in children as young as 8 months of age but, unlike TNMG, has not been diagnosed in fetuses (i.e., 9 weeks or older unborn offspring) or newborns. JMG accounts for about 10–15% of all MG cases and appears to be more prevalent in Asian than white populations, i.e., it represents up to 50% of all TNMG in Asians. Unlike TNMG but similar to MG, JMG is caused by the afflicted individuals production of antibodies directed at adult nAChRs, MuSK, or LRP4. (Individuals with JMG have an increased rate of also having Hashimoto disease, polymyositis, and other autoimmune diseases.) The other form of pediatric myasthenia gravis is termed the congenital myasthenic syndrome, i.e., CMGS. CMGS is not an autoimmune disease. It is a group of rare hereditary disorders in which the neuromuscular transmission in their skeletal muscles is dysfunctional due to the inheritance of defective genes. The defective genes code for proteins in the neuromuscular junctions that, due to their defects, reduce the number of nAChRs that are functional. One study reviewed the mutations in 32 genes that were responsible for causing CMGS. These genes' protein products function as ion-channels, enzymes, or structural, signaling, sensor, or transporter proteins in the neuromuscular junctions. The skeletal muscles of individuals with one of these mutations exhibited easy fatigability, hypotonia (i.e., poor muscle tone), weakness, and/or delayed development of facial, bulbar, limb, respiratory, head, and/or back skeletal muscles. Mutations in the COLQ, CHRNE, RAPSN, Dok-7, and CHAT genes were the most common mutations causing CMGS. None of the reported mutations caused pure ocular myasthenia, i.e., skeletal muscles weaknesses in the eye but not other areas.

== Causes ==
=== Transient neonatal myasthenia gravis ===
TNMG is due to antibodies against the adult nAChR (about 85% of cases), the MuSK protein (about 6% of cases), and the LRP4 in many of the remaining cases. These antibodies flow from the mother's blood through the placenta and into the fetus's blood and tissue. TNMG affects about 1 in 8 children born to mothers who have been diagnosed with myasthenia gravis and has been reported to occur in the offspring of mothers who have MG that is in remission.

=== Fetal acetylcholine receptor inactivation syndrome ===
In rare cases, the FARIS form of TNMG develops in the fetus. It occurs when the mother's antibodies are directed at the fetal form of the nAChR and flow from her circulation through the placenta and into the fetus's circulation and tissues. The fetal and adult nAChR proteins consists two α subunits and one eacj of 3 other subunit proteins, (α2, β, γ, δ) and (α2, β, ε, δ), respectively, with the fetal form persisting in the fetus until its γ subunit is replaced by the ε subunit to form the adult nAChR; this occurs by about the 33rd week of gestation. Some publications have termed the more severe forms of FARIS as arthrogryposis multiplex congenita. i.e., AMC, because its offspring, among other severe abnormalities, have arthrogryposis, i.e., disabling joint contractures.

== Symptoms ==
It is very likely and therefore to be anticipated that a fetus/newborn will have TNMG if: a) one or more of its siblings was previously diagnosed as having TNMG or b) if he/she is the offspring of a mother with MG and exhibits reduced, rapidly declining, or absent fetal movements. (Fetal movements are movements caused by the fetus's own muscle activity). Women perceive the first of their offspring's movements between the 16th and 20th weeks of their pregnancy after which the number of these movements may increase to a peak by 29 to 38 week of gestation. A fetus may show a gradual and slight decline in the number of its movements during its third trimester due to its improved coordination and/or reduced amniotic fluid volume coupled with increases in its size. However, sharp declines in or a lack of fetal movements are warnings that the fetus has serious abnormalities or difficulties (e.g., inadequate tissue oxygen levels).

=== Transient neonatal myasthenia gravis ===
About 50% of TNMG cases first show symptoms at birth with the remaining showing symptoms 6 to 72 hours or, uncommonly, up to several days after birth. This delay may be due to the immunosuppressing actions of α-fetoprotein which is elevated in pregnant women and newborns and/or the transfer of cholinesterase inhibitor medications used during labor from the mother to her newborn. The afflicted offspring typically show skeletal muscle hypotonia (i.e., poor muscle tone) and weaknesses that are most prominent in head and neck muscles and cause facial diplegia (i.e., paralysis or weakness of the skeletal muscles on both sides of the face), reduced control of swallowing; weak crying, sucking, and chewing; the inability to keep the jaw in place; feeding difficulties; and breathing difficulties which, while rare, may require mechanical ventilation. In a review study only one in 15 newborns with TNMG needed intubation and mechanical ventilation for its respiratory distress. Some infants with TNMG develop jaundice; this jaundice may be due to inadequate fluid intake rather than direct damage to the liver. In the majority of TNMG newborns, their dysfunctions, including those that are severe or life-threatening, improve and then end within a short time after their maternal TNMG-causing antibodies have dissipated, generally within 3 to 4 months after their birth.

=== Fetal acetylcholine receptor inactivation syndrome ===
Fetuses and newborns with FARIS generally have a more severe disease than those with TNMB. FARIS is caused by antibodies blocking the fetal type of nAChRs. This blockage causes disorders that begin during the early phases of fetal development and result in tissue and organ malformations as well as other disorders that are not fully reversible and may last a lifetime. In a review of 46 FARIS cases including those that would be classified as the severest form of FARIS (sometimes termed fetal acetylcholine receptor antibody-related disorder, i.e., FARAD): a) half of the cases occurred in mothers who, while having MG, had not previously been diagnosed as having it; b) 7 pregnancies were terminated because of serious symptoms and/or organ malformations in the fetus; c) 4 offspring died after birth due mainly to respiratory failure; and d) surviving infants had weaknesses in or muscle contractures of the bulbar and respiratory skeletal muscles that caused facial muscle weaknesses, leg/arm muscle weaknesses, velopharyngeal insufficiency (i.e., speech deficits due to poor movement of the soft palate), feeding difficulties, hearing losses, weakness of the diaphragm, pyloric stenosis (i.e., narrowing of the opening in the stomach that connects to the beginning of the small intestine), and central nervous system deficiencies such as autism, language disorders (i.e., impaired processing of linguistic information), the attention deficit hyperactivity disorder, and intellectual impairments. The cause(s) for the cited central nervous system's defects is not understood. Other studies on the severe form of FARIS reported on cases of fetuses and newborns that suffered polyhydramnios, i.e., excessive amniotic fluid in the amniotic sac, arthrogryposis, i.e., congenital joint contractures, and esophageal atresia, i.e., the esophagus ending in a pouch rather than entering the stomach.

== Diagnosis ==
The congenital myasthenic syndrome (i.e., CMGS) and Juvenile MG (i.e., JMG) must be distinguished from TNMG/FARIS. Individuals with one of the CMGS inherited genetic disease do not have circulating antibodies to the adult nAChR, MuSK, or LRP4 proteins. Individuals with JMG do have these circulating antibodies but in no case have they presented with symptoms at ages less than 8 months. The presence of classic TNMG symptoms in the offspring of mothers who have MG is regarded as sufficient evidence for the diagnosis of TNMG in their offspring. However, the offspring of about 88% of mothers with MG do not have TNMG, and the offspring of TNMG may not have "classic" MG symptoms, i.e., may not have clinical abnormalities clear enough to support the diagnosis of TNMG. In these cases, the identification of antibodies to the adult nAChR, MuSK, or LRP4 protein or to the fetal nAChR in the offspring's circulation is the definitive standard for diagnosing TNMG and FARIS, respectively.

== Treatment ==
Women with MG should be monitored with standard prenatal care screenings, e.g., regular assessments of fetal growth, self-monitoring of fetal movements starting at 24 weeks of gestation, and medical ultrasound scans before 24 weeks of gestation. It is particularly important that the newborn of mothers with MG be closely monitored for any signs or symptoms of respiratory depression that may lead to respiratory failure and the need to be treated with mechanical ventilation.

=== Transient neonatal myasthenia gravis ===
A review of 147 cases of TNMG concluded that 4 days of hospital monitoring was sufficient to detect respiratory depression and other serious complications of TNMG such as bulbar MG muscle involvement which is associated with an increased risk of leading to respiratory depression. The treatment of TNMG is mainly supportive and dependent on the severity of the newborn's symptoms, i.e., it ranges from small oral feedings to mechanical ventilation but nonetheless is based on knowing that these symptoms will disappear or at least not worsen in most cases after 3 to 4 months. A recent review recommended the treatments listed in the following Table for TNMG-afflicted offspring based on the severity of their symptoms. (In this Table: a positive pharmacological challenge test is one showing definite improvement in myasthenic muscle weakness within 10–15 minutes of administering a single intramuscular or subcutaneous injection of neostigmine; intravenous immunoglobulin therapy is the infusion of a mixture of human antibodies that have a wide range of anti-inflammatory and other actions of clinical benefit in treating TNMG; and plasmapheresis is the removal of plasma from MG patients or exchange of their plasma with normal human plasma to reduce the MG-causing antibody levels and thereby the symptoms of TNMG.) Note that newborns undergoing mechanical ventilation should not receive acetylcholinesterase inhibitors because these inhibitors may increase airway mucous secretions and thereby impair this ventilation and increase airway infections.

Severity grade	Symptoms	Treatments
Very mild	Fluctuating mild hypotonia, oral feeding possible	Close observation and breastfeeding support
Mild	Persistent or intermittent hypotonia, feeding difficulties	Consider low-dose acetylcholinesterase inhibitor (e.g., neostigmine or pyridostigmine) before feeding if results of a pharmacological challenge test are positive
Moderate	Inadequate Oral feeding but no respiratory distress	Nasogastric tube feedings, an acetylcholinesterase inhibitor, and consider giving intravenous immunoglobulin
Severe	Respiratory distress	Support of respiration, acetylcholinesterase inhibitor, and regular intravenous immunoglobulin and/or plasmapheresis

=== Fetal acetylcholine receptor inactivation syndrome ===
A male infant born with FARIS had severe symptoms. He required mechanical ventilation from birth to 3 weeks of age and also had profoundly weak trunk, facial, and bulbar skeletal muscles that improved slowly and only partially over several years. At the age of 4.9 years, he had persistent facial diplegia with severe language difficulties, a weak voice, drooling, and substantially reduced stamina all of which showed little or no response to the oral acetylcholinesterase inhibitor, pyridostigmine. However, treatment with oral salbutamol, a drug that stimulates the beta-2 adrenergic receptor, greatly reduced these symptoms within 48 hours. In a subsequent study of 16 individuals with FARIS aged less than 4 weeks, 4 full weeks, 10 weeks, and 6 months to 17 years, oral salbutamol caused symptom improvements in 13 (81.3%) with all three who were 10 weeks old or younger showing improvements. In further studies, 21 pregnant women that ended up having FARIS-afflicted offspring were administered an immunotherapeutic regimen consisting of intravenous immunoglobulin or plasmapheresis with or without high-dose corticosteroids from their first trimester onward. Compared to 65 immunotherapy-untreated women that had FARIS offspring, this treatment was significantly effective in preventing death and other severe FARIS disorders in the offspring. These beneficial effects were less pronounced when the immunotherapies were given to women later in their pregnancies. The two studies concluded that oral salbutamol is a symptomatic treatment option for neonates as well as older individuals with FARIS and suggested that, while further studies are needed, infusions of the cited immunotherapeutic agents into pregnant women who are known or strongly suspected of carrying fetuses that have FARIS may reduce the severity of their fetuses' symptoms and disorders.
