= Neuromuscular junction disease =

- Specialty: Neurology

Neuromuscular junction disease is a medical condition where the normal conduction through the neuromuscular junction fails to function correctly.

== Autoimmune ==
In diseases such as myasthenia gravis, the end plate potential (EPP) fails to effectively activate the muscle fiber due to an autoimmune reaction against acetylcholine receptors, resulting in muscle weakness and fatigue.

Myasthenia gravis is caused most commonly by auto-antibodies against the acetylcholine receptor. It has recently been realized that a second category of gravis is due to auto-antibodies against MuSK. A different condition, Lambert–Eaton myasthenic syndrome, is usually associated with presynaptic antibodies to the voltage-dependent calcium channel. It is possible for these conditions to coexist.

== Neuromuscular junction ==
The neuromuscular junction is a specialized synapse between a neuron and the muscle it innervates. It allows efferent signals from the nervous system to contract muscle fibers causing them to contract. In vertebrates, the neuromuscular junction is always excitatory, therefore to stop contraction of the muscle, inhibition must occur at the level of the efferent motor neuron. In other words, the inhibition must occur at the level of the spinal cord.

Release of acetylcholine vesicles from the presynaptic terminal occurs only after adequate depolarization of the efferent nerve. Once a motor nerve action potential reaches the presynaptic nerve terminal it causes an increase in intracellular calcium concentration by causing an increase in ion conductance through voltage gated calcium channels. This increase in calcium concentration allows the acetylcholine vesicles to fuse with the plasma membrane at the presynaptic membrane, in a process called exocytosis, thus releasing acetylcholine into the synapse. Once acetylcholine is present in the synapse it is able to bind to nicotinic acetylcholine receptors increasing conductance of certain cations, sodium and potassium in the postsynaptic membrane and producing an excitatory end plate-current. As cations flow into the postsynaptic cell, this causes a depolarization, as the membrane voltage increases above normal resting potential. If the signal is of sufficient magnitude, than an action potential will be generated post synaptically. The action potential will propagate through the sarcolemma to the interior of the muscle fibers eventually leading to an increase in intracellular calcium levels and subsequently initiating the process of Excitation–contraction coupling. Once coupling begins it allows the sarcomeres of the muscles to shorten, thus leading to the contraction of the muscle.

Neuromuscular junction diseases are a result of a malfunction in one or more steps of the above pathway. As a result, normal functioning can be completely or partially inhibited, with the symptoms largely presenting themselves as problems in mobility and muscle contraction as expected from disorders in motor end plates. Neuromuscular junction diseases can also be referred to as end plate diseases or disorders.

Among neuromuscular diseases some can be autoimmune disease, or hereditary disorders. They can affect either presynaptic mechanisms or postsynaptic mechanisms, preventing the junction from functioning normally. The most studied diseases affecting the human acetylcholine receptor are myasthenia gravis and some forms of congenital myasthenic syndrome. Other diseases include the Lambert–Eaton syndrome and botulism.

== Classification ==
There are two ways to classify neuromuscular diseases. The first relies on its mechanism of action, or how the action of the diseases affects normal functioning (whether it is through mutations in genes or more direct pathways such as poisoning). This category divides neuromuscular diseases into three broad categories: immune-mediated disease, toxic/metabolic and congenital syndromes.

The second classification method divides the diseases according to the location of their disruption. In the neuromuscular junction, the diseases will either act on the presynaptic membrane of the motor neuron, the synapse separating the motor neuron from the muscle fiber, or the postsynaptic membrane (the muscle fiber).

=== Immune-mediated ===
Immune-mediated diseases include a variety of diseases not only affecting the neuromuscular junction. Immune-mediated disorders range from simple and common problems such as allergies to disorders such as HIV/AIDS. Within this classification, autoimmune disorders are considered to be a subset of immune-mediated syndromes. Autoimmune diseases occur when the body's immune system begins to target its own cells, often causing harmful effects.

The neuromuscular junction diseases present within this subset are myasthenia gravis, and Lambert-Eaton syndrome.(reference 26) In each of these diseases, a receptor or other protein essential to normal function of the junction is targeted by antibodies in an autoimmune attack by the body.

=== Toxic/metabolic ===
Metabolic diseases are usually a result of abnormal functioning of one of the metabolic processes required for regular production and utilization of energy in a cell. This can occur by damaging or disabling an important enzyme, or when a feedback system is abnormally functioning. Toxic diseases are a result of a form of poison that effects neuromuscular junction functioning. Most commonly animal venom or poison, or other toxic substances are the origin of the problem.

Neuromuscular junction diseases in this category include snake venom poisoning, botulism, arthropod poisoning, organophosphates and hypermagnesemia.(reference 13) Organophosphates are present in many insecticides and herbicides. They are also the basis of many nerve gases.(reference 27) Hypermagnesmia is a condition where the balance of magnesium in the body is unstable and concentrations are higher than normal baseline values.(reference 28)

=== Congenital ===
Congenital syndromes affecting the neuromuscular junction are considered a very rare form of disease, occurring in 1 out of 200,000 in the United Kingdom.(reference 29) These are genetically inherited disorders. Symptoms are seen early since the affected individuals carry the mutation from birth. Congenital syndromes are usually classified by the location of the affected gene products. Congenital syndromes can have multiple targets affecting either the presynaptic, synaptic or postsynaptic parts of the neuromuscular junction.(reference 30) For example, if the malfunctioning or inactive protein is acetylcholinesterase, this would be classified as a synapse congenital syndrome.(reference 29)

=== Presynaptic ===
The diseases that act on the presynaptic membrane are autoimmune neuromyotonia, Lambert–Eaton syndrome, congenital myasthenia gravis and botulism.(reference 5) All of these disorders negatively affect the presynaptic membrane in some way. Neuromyotonia causes antibodies to damage the normal function of potassium rectifier channels, while Lambert–Eaton syndrome causes antibodies to attack presynaptic calcium channels.(reference 7) Congenital myasthenia gravis is a large group of diseases, since the genetic defects can affect any point in the chain of events leading to successful transmission across the junction. One discovered type of congenital myasthenia gravis can affect the junction presynaptically by a mutation in the gene encoding choline acetyl transferase.(reference 29) This protein is an enzyme that is responsible for catalyzing the reaction that combines acetyl-coenzyime A with choline, yielding acetylcholine.(reference 31)

There are many mechanisms through which presynaptic function can be impaired. Most often this causes a decrease in the release of acetylcholine. It can also impair vesicle exocytosis by interfering with the complex guiding vesicle fusion and release of contents. Mechanism of action can also impair the calcium channels that induce exocytosis of the vesicles. Other ion channels can also be disrupted, such as the potassium channels causing inefficient repolarization at the presynaptic membrane as in neuromyotonia.(reference 5)

=== Synapse ===
At the synaptic cleft, the neurotransmitter normally diffuses across the synapse to eventually contact postsynaptic receptors. However, after exiting the presynaptic membrane, the neurotransmitters can be hindered by a subset of diseases that interfere with the transmission of the neurotransmitter across the synapse. The mechanism currently known that operates via the synaptic cleft causing impairment of normal functioning is another congenital myasthenia gravis.(reference 7) This mechanism is the only currently known disease that acts on the synapse.(reference 12) It acts by impairing the function of the enzyme that breaks down acetylcholine causing it to become very hypertonic at the synapse.(reference 12) This increase in acetylcholine in the synapse disrupts normal functioning of the junction,.(reference 32)(reference 33)

=== Postsynaptic ===
The highest number of diseases affect the neuromuscular junction postsynaptically. In other words, it is the most susceptible to negative intervention.(reference 7) The targets of these postsynaptic diseases can be multiple different proteins. Immune-mediated myasthenia gravis being the most common, effecting the acetylcholine receptors at the post synaptic membrane.(reference 35) All the diseases that affect the postsynaptic membrane are forms of myasthenia gravis.(reference 5) Here is a list of the diseases: myasthenia gravis, neonatal myasthenia gravis, drug-induced myasthenia gravis and several types of Congenital myasthenia where the product of the mutated gene is a postsynaptic protein (reference renamed from 5)

== Most common diseases ==
=== Myasthenia gravis ===
Myasthenia gravis is the most common neuromuscular disease affecting function of the end plate in patients. It is present in 1 person out of 10,000 in the population, and its onset is usually in either younger or older individuals. (reference 14)

Acquired myasthenia gravis is the most common neuromuscular junction disease.(reference 7) Important observations were made by Patrick and Lindstrom in 1973 when they found that antibodies attacking the acetylcholine receptors were present in around 85% of cases of myasthenia gravis.(reference renamed form 13)(reference 36) The remaining diseases were also a result of antibody attacks on vital proteins, but instead of the acetylcholine receptor, the culprits were MuSK, a muscle-specific serum kinase, and lipoprotein receptor-related protein.(reference 36) So these mechanisms describe myasthenia gravis that is acquired, and not congenital, affecting these vital proteins by an immunological response against self-antigens. The cases not caused by antibodies against the acetylcholine receptors became by convention called seronegative myasthenia gravis.(reference 37) The term seronegative came about because scientists would be testing for acetylcholine receptor antibodies in patients that had myasthenia gravis resulting in negative tests in the serum. This does not imply that there are no antibodies present, but this terminology only became present because scientists were testing for the wrong antigen.(reference 36)(reference 38)

Transient neonatal myasthenia gravis is a very rare condition in which a mother with myasthenia gravis passes down her myasthenia gravis-inducing antibodies to her fetus through the placenta, causing the fetus to be born with antibodies that attach to self-antigens at the neuromuscular junction.(reference 12) Most cases of transient neonatal myasthenia gravis resolve when these antibodies dissipate, i.e., with 2 to 4 months.

Drug-induced myasthenia gravis is also a very rare condition in which pharmacological drugs cause a blockade or disruption of the NMJ machinery.(reference 12) Robert W. Barrons summarizes the possible causes of drug-induced myasthenia gravis: "Prednisone was most commonly implicated as aggravating myasthenia gravis, and D-penicillamine was most commonly associated with myasthenic syndrome. The greatest frequency of drug-induced neuromuscular blockade was seen with aminoglycoside-induced postoperative respiratory depression. However, drugs most likely to impact myasthenic patients negatively are those used in the treatment of the disease. These include overuse of anticholinesterase drugs, high-dose prednisone, and anesthesia and neuromuscular blockers for thymectomy."(reference 39)

=== Lambert-Eaton myasthenic syndrome (LEMS) ===
Lambert-Eaton myasthenic syndrome (LEMS) is similar to myasthenia gravis in that it is an immune-mediated response acting against a specific protein in the neuromuscular junction. The difference is that LEMS is a result of an autoimmune response on the voltage-gated calcium channels of the presynaptic membrane.(reference 14) The antibodies attack the voltage-gated calcium channels of the P/Q type.(reference 35) Abnormal activity of this ion channel, which usually initiates the process of acetylcholine vesicles from the presynaptic membrane once the membrane is sufficiently depolarized, causes less acetylcholine to be released into the synapse.(reference 12) LEMS is about 20 times more rare than myasthenia gravis.(reference 40)

LEMS also differs from myasthenia gravis in that it is usually associated with small-cell lung cancer, which is present in 60% percent of patients.(reference 40) It seems that as cancer develops, the body will begin to develop antibodies against the cancer, and in some cases the antibodies can also attack the calcium channels present at the presynaptic membrane.(reference 12) In the cases where no cancer is present in the patient, there is usually an underlying different autoimmune disease that causes the immune system to become hyperactive attacking its own antigens.(reference 40)

== Other diseases ==
=== Neuromyotonia ===
Neuromyotonia is classified into three types.(reference 14) The most common form of this disease is acquired neuromyotonia, which is the result of an autoimmune attack on rectifier voltage-gated potassium channels.(reference 12) This causes the presynaptic membrane to remain hyperpolarized, making it difficult for adequate depolarizations to occur.(reference 5)

=== Congenital myasthenia ===
This is the most complex and diverse congenital myasthenic syndrome.(reference 29) Since this is a genetic disorder, there are infinite possibilities of genes that could be mutated in different ways that could disrupt normal functioning of the neuromuscular junction. Around 11 gene targets have been specified.(reference 3) Its prevalence in the population is very difficult to measure since it is a rare genetic disorder that presents itself as a neuromuscular junction disorder, but in the United Kingdom, estimates are 1 in 200,000 of the population.(reference 29) The major signs that indicate a congenital syndrome are symptoms present at birth, such as weakness and a depressive response to repetitive nerve stimulation.(reference 29)

Since the disease is genetic in nature and is not immune-mediated, any serum test will show up negative since congenital myasthenia is not a result of antibodies attacking the vital proteins of the NMJ.(reference 7) Knowledge of this disease is very plastic as new genes that could be "effected" (affected? effective?) could be discovered as we gain more insight into the different types.

=== Botulism ===
Neurotoxin may act on the neuromuscular junction either post synaptically or presynaptically as there are several different forms of toxins that the NMJ is sensitive to.(reference 14) Common mechanisms of action include blockage of acetylcholine release at the synapse via inhibition of the SNARE protein, thus causing the NMJ to become abnormal in function.(reference 12)

== Diagnosis ==
=== Tests ===
- Repetitive nerve stimulation
- Electromyography (EMG)
- Nerve conduction studies
- Exercise testing
- Single-fiber EMG

== Treatment ==
=== Symptomatic treatment ===
Cholinesterase inhibitors at AChR

=== Immunosuppressive treatment ===
- Thymectomy
- Medical therapy: corticosteroids, non-steroidal immunosuppression
- Short-term treatment: plasmapheresis, IVIG
