= Synaptogenesis =

Formation of neuronal junctions in the nervous system

Synaptogenesis is the formation of synapses between neurons in the nervous system. Although it occurs throughout a healthy person's lifespan, an explosion of synapse formation occurs during early brain development, known as exuberant synaptogenesis. Synaptogenesis is particularly important during an individual's critical period, during which there is a certain degree of synaptic pruning due to competition for neural growth factors by neurons and synapses. Processes that are not used, or inhibited during their critical period will fail to develop normally later on in life.

== Exuberant synaptogenesis ==
Brain growth and development begins during gestation and into the postnatal period. Brain development can be divided into stages including: neurogenesis, differentiation, proliferation, migration, synaptogenesis, gliogenesis and myelination, and apoptosis and synaptic pruning. Synaptogenesis occurs in the third trimester during gestation as well as the first two years postnatal. During neuron differentiation, growth cones that extend off the tip of each axon act as the site for elongation of each axon. These growth cones find signal molecules which act as guidance cues and form synapses. Connections formed between neurites may be random or selective.

Exuberant synaptogenesis is characterized by a few characteristics. First, it involves the formation of long axonal projections, and an overproduction of small axonal branches, synapses, and dendritic branches and/or spines. Throughout this process, many of these structures may be maintained or eventually eliminated. Elimination may occur by neuronal death or selective deletion.

Developmental exuberance may occur macro- or microscopically. Macroscopic exuberance occurs when transient projections are formed between macroscopic regions in the brain. In comparison, microscopic exuberance occurs when transient structures involved in communication between neurons forms.

=== Signaling molecules ===
==== UNC-4 transcription factor ====
What specific molecules and chemical signals are involved in synaptogenesis has yet to be fully understood. Some evidence posits that transcription factors are heavily involved in directing where axons and dendrites form synapses before and after synaptogenesis. The main study focusing on this involved motor neurons of C.elegans. In this study, researchers found that knockout animals without the gene, unc-4 have motor defects specifically with moving backwards. This gene is necessary for the Prd-like homeodomain transcription factor. These animals also had abnormal synaptic specificity indicating that this transcription factor is likely involved in determining where and how synapses are formed.

Other studies found that this transcription factor was involved in synaptic strength. In this study, it was found that the unc-4 pathway negatively regulates ceh-12, a gene involved in regulating synaptic choice.

==== Growth cones and guidance cues ====
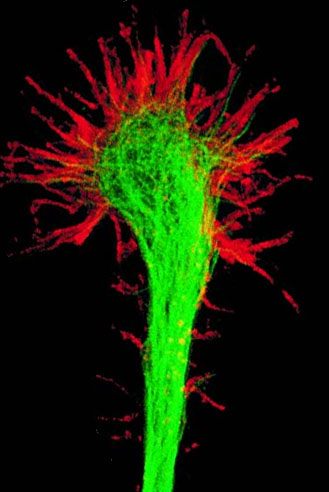
Image of axonal growth cones

Guidance cues are essential for nervous system development as well as synaptic maintenance and remodeling. Guidance cues--attractive or repulsive--are sensed by growth cones. Expression of guidance cue genes is mediated at the transcriptional, post-transcriptional, translational, and post-translational levels.

Most guidance cues converge onto various families of small GTPases which go back and forth from active to inactive forms. There are a multitude of signaling pathways involved in this process but the key ones involve netrins (NTNs) and fibronectin leucine-rich repeat transmembrane proteins (FLRTs), the Slit family, semamorphins (SEMA), ephrin, non-canonical genes (morphogens, chemokines, growth factors), and RTN4 receptors.

===== Netrin and FLRTs signaling pathways =====
NTNs and FLRTs both act as guidance cues. NTNs may act as attractants or repellents by DCC and neogenin1, or repellants by UNC5 receptors. UNC5s also act as repulsive receptors for FLRTs. Besides guidance cues, NTNs and FLRTs are also involved in synaptic specificity and synaptogenesis.

In studying Netrin, one study found that Netrin is not needed for long-range guidance decision, but is used for short-range synaptic targeting. This was determined from studying an RP3 axon, which expresses Netrin as an axonal guidance cue. In gene knockout studies of Netrin, the RP3 growth cone still formed the correct synapses but the connections were not strong.

=== Elimination Mechanisms of Transient Projections ===
In exuberant synaptogenesis, many of the projections formed are eliminated either by neuronal death or selective deletion.

By using retrograde tracing to label transient projections, researchers were able to detect the mechanism of selection axonal deletion. Most of the evidence is provided from studying axonal elimination in the visual cortex, so more research is necessary. However, current research proposes that this elimination mechanism involves retraction of branches over short distances in addition to degeneration of long branches.

The main question that researchers are asking is: what triggers axonal elimination of exuberant synapses? In one study, researchers determined that mice mutant for semaphorin, a molecule that is chemorepulsive to growth cones, had defective pruning in hippocampal mossy fibers. Other chemorepulsive molecules include Slits and ephrins.

== Synaptic adhesion molecules (SAMs) ==
Synaptic adhesion molecules (SAMs) have been presented by researchers as potentially key molecules involved in the organization of synaptic junctions. SAMs are involved in pre- to postsynaptic signaling and the reverse direction.

=== Distribution ===
SAMs often form heterophilic complexes that differ based on location. For example, presynaptic SAMs are present on excitatory and inhibitory synapses. In comparison, post synaptic SAMs are very diverse and are specific for excitatory or inhibitory synapses.

=== Classification ===
The most well-studied SAMs involved in developing and mature synapses include neurexins and neuroligins, EphBs and ephrin-Bs, immunoglobulin (Ig)-containing cell adhesion molecules and cadherins.

==== Neurexins and neuroligins ====
Studies demonstrate that both neurexins and neuroligins are involved in excitatory and inhibitory synapse formation. Neurexin-neuroligin interactions are also involved in the organization of pre- and postsynaptic terminal components.

There are various subtypes of neurexins and neuroligins which determine their involvement in either excitatory or inhibitory synapse formation. α- and β-neurexin have similar intracellular domains but different sized extracellular domains. Neuroligins bind to neurexins. Neuroligin 1 is involved in excitatory specializations formation, but it depends on the results of alternative splicing. Neuroligin 2 is localized to inhibitory synapses. Neuroligin 3 is likely involved in excitatory synaptogenesis, but more research needs to be conducted on this. However, one study found that knockdown of all neuroligins leads to a decrease in frequency of inhibitory but not excitatory miniature synaptic currents. Both neurexin and neuroligins have a PDZ binding domain that determines what synaptic scaffolding proteins they interact with.

Another important role of neuroligins and neurexins is the determination of where a synapse forms. For example, co-clustering of neuroligin 1 to PSD-95 acts as a hotspot for presynaptic machinery.

==== EphBs and Ephrin-Bs ====
Ephs can be divided into A and B subclasses based on affinity for ephrin-A or ephrin-B ligands. Studies reveal that mainly EphB-ephrin-B interactions are involved in synaptogenesis.

The binding of EphB to Ephrin-B leads to bidirectional signaling and contact-mediated transcellular signaling. During development, this interaction is primarily involved in axon guidance and boundary formation. However, these signaling molecules have also been shown to modify postsynaptic organization.

EphBs are particularly involved in excitatory synaptogenesis. When activated by soluble ephrin-B-Fc fusion protein, EphB induces clustering of NMDARs and AMPARs, an increase in the number of presynaptic terminals, and the formation of dendritic spines. Lastly, binding of Ephrin-B to EphB2 leads to interactions between the extracellular domains of the NMDAR and EphB2.

==== Immunoglobulins ====
A key characteristic of Ig molecules is the diverse number of globular extracellular cysteine-looped domains. A number of members of the Ig superfamily have been identified as essential molecules for the organization of pre and post synaptic domains. These include synaptic cell adhesion molecules (SynCAM), synaptic adhesion-like molecules (SALMs), netrin G2 ligand (NGL2), neural cell adhesion molecule (NCAM), etc.

| Immunoglobulin (Ig) superfamily type | Function |
| Synaptic cell adhesion molecules (SynCAM) | Regulation of the number of presynaptic specializations, and mediation of cell adhesion independently of calcium. |
| Synaptic adhesion-like molecules (SALMs) | Plays a role in synapse maturation, neurite outgrowth during development, AMPAR clustering, PSD-95-containing synaptic site formation, and the regulation of the formation of excitatory synaptic sites. |
| Netrin G2 ligand (NGL2) | Promotes dendritic spine formation, clustering of PSD-95 and NMDARs, triggering of presynaptic differentiation, formation of excitatory synapses. |
| Neural cell adhesion molecule (NCAM) | Not necessary for synaptogenesis, but hypothesized to play a role in axon guidance. |

==== Cadherins ====
Neuronal (N)-cadherins are found in pre and postsynaptic terminals. Prior to differentiation, N-cadherins increase in quantity at axon-dendrite contact sites and eventually restrict their presence to sites around the active zone in mature neurons. N-cadherin is also involved in regulating AMPAR trafficking. Besides this, N-cadherin also plays a role in the maturation and stabilization of synaptic specializations. Lastly, N-cadherins help to control dendritic spine morphology and motility.

=== Function ===
The main function of SAMs in a broad sense includes forming the synapse and determining the properties of synapse.

==== Synaptic specificity ====
In general, three processes are involved in determining the locations and properties of synapses. To determine location, axon guidance is coupled to partner choice which are processes both guided by SAMs. However, this process is still unclear. Previous studies demonstrate that axon guidance involves non-synaptic adhesion molecules. Researchers hypothesize that partner choice is initiated by SAMs.

The mechanisms by which partner choice is determined is also not clear. However, three hypotheses have been proposed to help explain how synapse specificity is determined:

1. Partner is choice is determined and then synapse formation occurs, implying they are separate processes mechanistically
2. Partner choice and synapse formation are the same process and both are determined by SAMs
3. Synapse formation occurs and then a selective elimination process.

However, studies observing a heterologous synapse formation assay and the involvement of SAM in non neuronal cells indicates that hypothesis 1 and 2 are most likely.

Currently, the only SAMs known to be involved in establishing proteins are: postsynaptic adhesion-GPCRs called latrophilins and brain angiogenesis inhibitors. Similarly, teneurins have been presented as mediators in synapse formation.

==== Properties of Synapses ====
The properties of synapses is likely shaped by bidirectional signaling between pre- and postsynaptic specialization and are mediated partly by SAMS. This is demonstrated by studies of neurexins, the most common type of SAMs.

Recent studies demonstrate that neurexins are necessary for organizing functional synapses and perform important functions depending on the type of neuron. This is generated by different neurexin isoforms. One example is the difference in function between presynaptic neurexin-1 containing an insert in SS4 (Nrxn1−SS4+) and neurexin-1 lacking an insert in SS4 (Nrxn1−SS4+) generated by alternative splicing. Nrxn1−SS4+ is involved in the trans-synaptic increase in postsynaptic NMDAR levels.

Other SAMs have a similar diversity in function. For example, LAR-PTPRs are also involved in NMDAR-mediated synapse responses. However, the main difference between LAR-PTPRs and neurexin-1 is that in neurexin-1 mediated signaling, surface levels of NMDARs are changed.

== Formation of the neuromuscular junction ==
The neuromuscular junction (NMJ) is the most well-characterized synapse in that it provides a simple and accessible structure that allows for easy manipulation and observation. Therefore, the synapse is well-researched due to its size and accessibility in the nervous system.

=== Function ===
Image of a neuromuscular junction

The synapse itself is composed of three cells: the motor neuron, the myofiber, and the Schwann cell. In a normally functioning synapse, a signal will cause the motor neuron to depolarize, by releasing the neurotransmitter acetylcholine (ACh). Acetylcholine travels across the synaptic cleft where it reaches acetylcholine receptors (AChR) on the plasma membrane of the myofiber, the sarcolemma. As the AChRs open ion channels, the membrane depolarizes, causing muscle contraction. The entire synapse is covered in a myelin sheath provided by the Schwann cell to insulate and encapsulate the junction. Another important part of the neuromuscular system and central nervous system are the astrocytes. While originally they were thought to have only functioned as support for the neurons, they play an important role in functional plasticity of synapses.

=== Origin and movement of cells ===
During development, each of the three germ layer cell types arises from different regions of the growing embryo. The individual myoblasts originate in the mesoderm and fuse to form a multi-nucleated myotube. During or shortly after myotube formation, motoneurons from the neural tube form preliminary contacts with the myotube. The Schwann cells arise from the neural crest and are led by the axons to their destination. Upon reaching it, they form a loose, unmyelinated covering over the innervating axons. The movement of the axons (and subsequently the Schwann cells) is guided by the growth cone, a filamentous projection of the axon that actively searches for neurotrophins released by the myotube.

The specific patterning of synapse development at the neuromuscular junction shows that the majority of muscles are innervated at their midpoints. Although it may seem that the axons specifically target the midpoint of the myotube, several factors reveal that this is not a valid claim. It appears that after the initial axonal contact, the newly formed myotube proceeds to grow symmetrically from that point of innervation. Coupled with the fact that AChR density is the result of axonal contact instead of the cause, the structural patterns of muscle fibers can be attributed to both myotatic growth as well as axonal innervation.

The preliminary contact formed between the motor neuron and the myotube generates synaptic transmission almost immediately, but the signal produced is very weak. There is evidence that Schwann cells may facilitate these preliminary signals by increasing the amount of spontaneous neurotransmitter release through small molecule signals. After about a week, a fully functional synapse is formed following several types of differentiation in both the post-synaptic muscle cell and the pre-synaptic motor neuron. This pioneer axon is of crucial importance because the new axons that follow have a high propensity for forming contacts with well-established synapses.

=== Post-synaptic differentiation ===
The most noticeable difference in the myotube following contact with the motor neuron is the increased concentration of AChR in the plasma membrane of the myotube in the synapse. This increased amount of AChR allows for more effective transmission of synaptic signals, which in turn leads to a more-developed synapse. The density of AChR is > 10,000/μm^{2} and approximately 10/μm^{2} around the edge. This high concentration of AChR in the synapse is achieved through clustering of AChR, up-regulation of the AChR gene transcription in the post-synaptic nuclei, and down-regulation of the AChR gene in the non-synaptic nuclei. The signals that initiate post-synaptic differentiation may be neurotransmitters released directly from the axon to the myotube, or they may arise from changes activated in the extracellular matrix of the synaptic cleft.

==== Clustering ====
AChR experiences multimerization within the post-synaptic membrane largely due to the signaling molecule Agrin. The axon of the motor neuron releases agrin, a proteoglycan that initiates a cascade that eventually leads to AChR association. Agrin binds to a muscle-specific kinase (MuSK) receptor in the post-synaptic membrane, and this in turn leads to downstream activation of the cytoplasmic protein Rapsyn. Rapsyn contains domains that allow for AChR association and multimerization, and it is directly responsible for AChR clustering in the post-synaptic membrane: rapsyn-deficient mutant mice fail to form AChR clusters.

==== Synapse-specific transcription ====
The increased concentration of AChR is not simply due to a rearrangement of pre-existing synaptic components. The axon also provides signals that regulate gene expression within the myonuclei directly beneath the synapse. This signaling provides for localized up-regulation of transcription of AChR genes and consequent increase in local AChR concentration. The two signaling molecules released by the axon are calcitonin gene-related peptide (CGRP) and neuregulin, which trigger a series of kinases that eventually lead to transcriptional activation of the AChR genes.

==== Extrasynaptic repression ====
Repression of the AChR gene in the non-synaptic nuclei is an activity-dependent process involving the electrical signal generated by the newly formed synapse. Reduced concentration of AChR in the extrasynaptic membrane in addition to increased concentration in the post-synaptic membrane helps ensure the fidelity of signals sent by the axon by localizing AChR to the synapse. Because the synapse begins receiving inputs almost immediately after the motoneuron comes into contact with the myotube, the axon quickly generates an action potential and releases ACh. The depolarization caused by AChR induces muscle contraction and simultaneously initiates repression of AChR gene transcription across the entire muscle membrane. Note that this affects gene transcription at a distance: the receptors that are embedded within the post-synaptic membrane are not susceptible to repression.

=== Pre-synaptic differentiation ===
Although the mechanisms regulating pre-synaptic differentiation are unknown, the changes exhibited at the developing axon terminal are well characterized. The pre-synaptic axon shows an increase in synaptic volume and area, an increase of synaptic vesicles, clustering of vesicles at the active zone, and polarization of the pre-synaptic membrane. These changes are thought to be mediated by neurotrophin and cell adhesion molecule release from muscle cells, thereby emphasizing the importance of communication between the motoneuron and the myotube during synaptogenesis. Like post-synaptic differentiation, pre-synaptic differentiation is thought to be due to a combination of changes in gene expression and a redistribution of pre-existing synaptic components. Evidence for this can be seen in the up-regulation of genes expressing vesicle proteins shortly after synapse formation as well as their localization at the synaptic terminal.

=== Synaptic maturation ===
Immature synapses are innervated at birth, due to the high propensity for new axons to innervate at a pre-existing synapse. As the synapse matures, the synapses segregate and eventually all axonal inputs except for one retract in a process called synapse elimination. Furthermore, the post-synaptic end plate grows deeper and creates folds through invagination to increase the surface area available for neurotransmitter reception. At birth, Schwann cells form loose, unmyelinated covers over groups of synapses, but as the synapse matures, Schwann cells become dedicated to a single synapse and form a myelinated cap over the entire neuromuscular junction.

==== Synapse elimination ====
The process of synaptic pruning known as synapse elimination is a presumably activity-dependent process that involves competition between axons. Hypothetically, a synapse strong enough to produce an action potential will trigger the myonuclei directly across from the axon to release synaptotrophins that will strengthen and maintain well-established synapses. This synaptic strengthening is not conferred upon the weaker synapses, thereby starving them out. It has also been suggested that in addition to the synaptotrophins released to the synapse exhibiting strong activity, the depolarization of the post-synaptic membrane causes release of synaptotoxins that ward off weaker axons.

=== Synapse formation specificity ===
A remarkable aspect of synaptogenesis is the fact that motor neurons are able to distinguish between fast and slow-twitch muscle fibers; fast-twitch muscle fibers are innervated by "fast" motor neurons, and slow-twitch muscle fibers are innervated by "slow" motor neurons. There are two hypothesized paths by which the axons of motor neurons achieve this specificity, one in which the axons actively recognize the muscles that they innervate and make selective decisions based on inputs, and another that calls for more indeterminate innervation of muscle fibers. In the selective paths, the axons recognize the fiber type, either by factors or signals released specifically by the fast or slow-twitch muscle fibers. In addition, selectivity can be traced to the lateral position that the axons are predeterminately arranged in order to link them to the muscle fiber that they will eventually innervate. The hypothesized non-selective pathways indicate that the axons are guided to their destinations by the matrix through which they travel. Essentially, a path is laid out for the axon and the axon itself is not involved in the decision-making process. Finally, the axons may non-specifically innervate muscle fibers and cause the muscles to acquire the characteristics of the axon that innervates them. In this path, a "fast" motoneuron can convert any muscle fiber into a fast-twitch muscle fiber. There is evidence for both selective and non-selective paths in synapse formation specificity, leading to the conclusion that the process is a combination of several factors.

== Synapse formation ==
Although the study of synaptogenesis within the central nervous system (CNS) is much more recent than that of the NMJ, there is promise of relating the information learned at the NMJ to synapses within the CNS. Many similar structures and basic functions exist between the two types of neuronal connections. At the most basic level, the CNS synapse and the NMJ both have a nerve terminal that is separated from the postsynaptic membrane by a cleft containing specialized extracellular material. Both structures exhibit localized vesicles at the active sites, clustered receptors at the post-synaptic membrane, and glial cells that encapsulate the entire synaptic cleft. In terms of synaptogenesis, both synapses exhibit differentiation of the pre- and post-synaptic membranes following initial contact between the two cells. This includes the clustering of receptors, localized up-regulation of protein synthesis at the active sites, and neuronal pruning through synapse elimination.

Despite these similarities in structure, there is a fundamental difference between the two connections. The CNS synapse is strictly neuronal and does not involve muscle fibers: for this reason the CNS uses different neurotransmitter molecules and receptors. More importantly, neurons within the CNS often receive multiple inputs that must be processed and integrated for successful transfer of information. Muscle fibers are innervated by a single input and operate in an all or none fashion. Coupled with the plasticity that is characteristic of the CNS neuronal connections, it is easy to see how increasingly complex CNS circuits can become.

=== Regulation ===
==== Signaling ====
The main method of synaptic signaling in the NMJ is through use of the neurotransmitter acetylcholine and its receptor. The CNS homolog is glutamate and its receptors, and one of special significance is the N-methyl-D-aspartate (NMDA) receptor. It has been shown that activation of NMDA receptors initiates synaptogenesis through activation of downstream products. The heightened level of NMDA receptor activity during development allows for increased influx of calcium, which acts as a secondary signal. Eventually, immediate early genes are activated by transcription factors and the proteins required for neuronal differentiation are translated. The NMDA receptor function is associated with the estrogen receptor in hippocampal neurons. Experiments conducted with estradiol show that exposure to the estrogen significantly increases synaptic density and protein concentration.

Synaptic signaling during synaptogenesis is not only activity-dependent, but is also dependent on the environment in which the neurons are located. For instance, brain-derived neurotrophic factor (BDNF) is produced by the brain and regulates several functions within the developing synapse, including enhancement of transmitter release, increased concentration of vesicles, and cholesterol biosynthesis. Cholesterol is essential to synaptogenesis because the lipid rafts that it forms provide a scaffold upon which numerous signaling interactions can occur. BDNF-null mutants show significant defects in neuronal growth and synapse formation. Aside from neurotrophins, cell-adhesion molecules are also essential to synaptogenesis. Often the binding of pre-synaptic cell-adhesion molecules with their post-synaptic partners triggers specializations that facilitate synaptogenesis. Indeed, a defect in genes encoding neuroligin, a cell-adhesion molecule found in the post-synaptic membrane, has been linked to cases of autism and intellectual disability. Finally, many of these signaling processes can be regulated by matrix metalloproteinases (MMPs) as the targets of many MMPs are these specific cell-adhesion molecules.

==== Morphology ====
The special structure found in the CNS that allows for multiple inputs is the dendritic spine, the highly dynamic site of excitatory synapses. This morphological dynamism is due to the specific regulation of the actin cytoskeleton, which in turn allows for regulation of synapse formation. Dendritic spines exhibit three main morphologies: filopodia, thin spines, and mushroom spines. The filopodia play a role in synaptogenesis through initiation of contact with axons of other neurons. Filopodia of new neurons tend to associate with multiply synapsed axons, while the filopodia of mature neurons tend to sites devoid of other partners. The dynamism of spines allows for the conversion of filopodia into the mushroom spines that are the primary sites of glutamate receptors and synaptic transmission.

== Contributions of the Wnt protein family ==
The (Wnt) family, includes several embryonic morphogens that contribute to early pattern formation in the developing embryo. Recently data have emerged showing that the Wnt protein family has roles in the later development of synapse formation and plasticity. Wnt contribution to synaptogenesis has been verified in both the central nervous system and the neuromuscular junction.

=== Central nervous system ===
Wnt family members contribute to synapse formation in the cerebellum by inducing presynaptic and postsynaptic terminal formation. This brain region contains three main neuronal cell types- Purkinje cells, granule cells and mossy fiber cells. Wnt-3 expression contributes to Purkinje cell neurite outgrowth and synapse formation. Granule cells express Wnt-7a to promote axon spreading and branching in their synaptic partner, mossy fiber cells. Retrograde secretion of Wnt-7a to mossy fiber cells causes growth cone enlargement by spreading microtubules. Furthermore, Wnt-7a retrograde signaling recruits synaptic vesicles and presynaptic proteins to the synaptic active zone. Wnt-5a performs a similar function on postsynaptic granule cells; this Wnt stimulates receptor assembly and clustering of the scaffolding protein PSD-95.

In the hippocampus Wnts in conjunction with cell electrical activity promote synapse formation. Wnt7b is expressed in maturing dendrites, and the expression of the Wnt receptor Frizzled (Fz), increases highly with synapse formation in the hippocampus. NMDA glutamate receptor activation increases Wnt2 expression. Long term potentiation (LTP) due to NMDA activation and subsequent Wnt expression leads to Fz-5 localization at the postsynaptic active zone. Furthermore, Wnt7a and Wnt2 signaling after NMDA receptor mediated LTP leads to increased dendritic arborization and regulates activity induced synaptic plasticity. Blocking Wnt expression in the hippocampus mitigates these activity dependent effects by reducing dendritic arborization and subsequently, synaptic complexity.

=== Neuromuscular junction ===
Similar mechanisms of action by Wnts in the central nervous system are observed in the neuromuscular junction (NMJ) as well. In the Drosophila NMJ mutations in the Wnt5 receptor Derailed (drl) reduce the number of and density of synaptic active zones. The major neurotransmitter in this system is glutamate. Wnt is needed to localize glutamatergic receptors on postsynaptic muscle cells. As a result, Wnt mutations diminish evoked currents on the postsynaptic muscle.

In the vertebrate NMJ, motor neuron expression of Wnt-11r contributes to acetylcholine receptor (AChR) clustering in the postsynaptic density of muscle cells. Wnt-3 is expressed by muscle fibers and is secreted retrogradely onto motor neurons. In motor neurons, Wnt-3 works with Agrin to promote growth cone enlargement, axon branching and synaptic vesicle clustering.

== Synaptogenesis in the Mature Brain ==
Although synaptogenesis occurs more commonly in the developing brain, imaging reveals that approximately 40% of dendritic spines found in the sensory and motor cortices are replaced every 5 days. Adult synaptogenesis is most prevalent in the olfactory bulb (OB) as well as the dentate gyrus (DG) of the hippocampus. The three main types of neurons that are added during this process include granule cells and periglomerular neurons (PGNs) in the OB and granule cells in the DG. However, granule cells in the OB are the largest population of new neurons formed in the adult brain.

=== Adult synaptogenesis in the dentate gyrus ===
Granule cells formed during the adult period In the dentate gyrus are excitatory neurons that receive glutamate from projection neurons in the entorhinal cortex and mossy cells in the hippocampus, as well as GABA from local interneurons. These neurons have projections to the CA3 region of the hippocampus.

The development of adult born granule cells in the DG is similar to that of development but it occurs at a slower pace. A week after these cells are generated, they receive GABA input which is initially depolarizing until two to four weeks when it becomes hyperpolarizing. This is due to inward chloride transporter NKCC1. After the second week, the dendrites of these cells form spines and receive glutamatergic input. By the second month, the electrophysiological and morphological properties of these adult cells is similar to perinatal granule cells.

Research finds that the maturation of adult-born DG granule cells is highly dependent on changes in neuronal activity and most of the new synapses formed by new DG granule cells is the result of seizures. Animal studies reveal that seizures cause increased number of mushroom spines and spiny, branched basal dendrites. Seizures may also cause increased excitability because it causes these cells to fire in synchrony with CA3 pyramidal neurons.

=== Adult synaptogenesis in the olfactory bulb ===
==== Periglomerular neurons ====
PGNs are classified as GABAergic or dopaminergic modulating interneurons. These receive input from olfactory sensory neurons which project to the dendrites of the primary neurons of the OB. These neurons surround glomeruli that contain olfactory sensory axons that connect to the primary neurons of the OB.

Unfortunately, not much is known about the development of these neurons in the adult brain. However, it was revealed by two-photon imaging that as these neurons mature, the dendritic spines become more stable. Additionally, studies reveal that at the postsynaptic sites of PGNs there are functional changes between sensory neurons and PGNs. For example, at olfactory nerve (ON) synapses there is an increase in the AMPA:NMDA ratio as the brain matures. It is yet to be understood whether this is an intrinsic property of PGNs or if this is due to the continuous turnover of olfactory sensory axons.

==== Granule neurons ====
Granule neurons of the OB are axonless GABAergic interneurons which connect to the primary neurons of the OB. These neurons have a basal and apical dendrite. Studies find that approximately 30,000 neurons are produced daily in the adult mouse with 97% of them differentiating into OB granule neurons.

When these cells originate in the adult OB, input synapses are developed at the proximal dendritic domain which do not have output synapses. This occurs prior to their ability to fire action potentials which contrasts to developmental granule OB neurons. Furthermore, it was found that survival and synaptic connectivity of newly formed granule neurons in the adult brain is dependent on activity in the OB.
