= Dok-7 =

Protein found in humans

DOK7

Identifiers
- Aliases: DOK7, C4orf25, CMS1B, CMS10, docking protein 7, FADS3
- External IDs: OMIM: 610285; MGI: 3584043; GeneCards: DOK7
Available structures
PDB	Ortholog search: PDBe RCSB
PDB	List of PDB id codes 3ML4

Gene location (Human)
Chr.	Chromosome 4 (human)
Band	4p16.3	Start	3,463,306 bp
Band	4p16.3	End	3,501,473 bp

Gene location (Mouse)
Chr.	Chromosome 5 (mouse)
Band	5|5 B2	Start	35,214,110 bp
Band	5|5 B2	End	35,245,183 bp
RNA expression pattern
Bgee	Human / Mouse (ortholog); Top expressed in: apex of heart; tibialis anterior muscle; right auricle of heart; left ventricle; gastrocnemius muscle; muscle of thigh; right uterine tube; germinal epithelium; pituitary gland; right hemisphere of cerebellum / Top expressed in: interventricular septum; otolith organ; utricle; muscle of thigh; substantia nigra; lumbar subsegment of spinal cord; quadriceps femoris muscle; myocardium of ventricle; Epithelium of choroid plexus; extraocular muscle; More reference expression data
BioGPS	n/a
Gene ontology
Molecular function	lipid binding; protein kinase binding
Cellular component	cell junction; plasma membrane; synapse; membrane; nucleus; nucleoplasm; mitochondrion
Biological process	positive regulation of protein tyrosine kinase activity
Sources:Amigo / QuickGO
Orthologs
Databases	NCBI: entry; OMA: entry
Species	Human	Mouse
Entrez	285489	231134
Ensembl	ENSG00000175920	ENSMUSG00000044716
UniProt	Q18PE1	Q18PE0
RefSeq (mRNA)	NM_001164673; NM_001256896; NM_001301071; NM_173660; NM_001363811	NM_172708; NM_001348274; NM_001348275; NM_001348276; NM_001348478
RefSeq (protein)	NP_001158145; NP_001243825; NP_001288000; NP_775931; NP_001350740	NP_001335203; NP_001335204; NP_001335205; NP_001335407; NP_766296
Location (UCSC)	Chr 4: 3.46 – 3.5 Mb	Chr 5: 35.21 – 35.25 Mb
PubMed search
- Wikidata
View/Edit Human	View/Edit Mouse

Protein Dok-7 is a protein that in humans is encoded by the gene DOK7. It is a non-catalytic cytoplasmic adaptor protein that is expressed specifically in muscle and is essential for the formation of neuromuscular synapses. Further, Dok-7 contains pleckstrin homology (PH) and phosphotyrosine-binding (PTB) domains that are critical for Dok-7 function. Finally, mutations in Dok-7 are commonly found in patients with limb-girdle congenital myasthenia.

== Dok-7 regulates neuromuscular synapse formation by activating MuSK ==
The formation of neuromuscular synapses requires the muscle-specific receptor tyrosine kinase (MuSK). In mice genetically mutant for MuSK, acetylcholine receptors (AChRs) fail to cluster and motor neurons fail to differentiate. Because Dok-7 mutant mice are indistinguishable from MuSK mutant mice, these observations suggest Dok-7 might regulate MuSK activation. Indeed, Dok-7 binds phosphorylated MuSK and activates MuSK in purified protein preparations and in muscle in-vivo by transgenic overexpression. Furthermore, the nerve-derived organizing factor agrin fails to stimulate MuSK activation in muscle cells genetically null for Dok-7. Thus, Dok-7 is both necessary and sufficient for the activation of MuSK.

== Dok-7 signaling ==
The requirement for MuSK in the formation of the NMJ was primarily demonstrated by mouse "knockout" studies. In mice which are deficient for either agrin or MuSK, the neuromuscular junction does not form.

Upon activation by its ligand agrin, MuSK signals via the proteins called Dok-7 and rapsyn, to induce "clustering" of acetylcholine receptors (AChR). Cell signaling downstream of MuSK requires Dok-7. Mice which lack this protein fail to develop endplates. Further, forced expression of Dok-7 induces the tyrosine phosphorylation, and thus the activation of MuSK. Dok-7 interacts with MuSK by way of protein "domain" called a "PTB domain."

In addition to the AChR, MuSK, and Dok-7 other proteins are then gathered, to form the endplate to the neuromuscular junction. The nerve terminates onto the endplate, forming the neuromuscular junction—a structure which is required to transmit nerve impulses to the muscle, and thus initiating muscle contraction.

== Congenital Myasthenia Syndrome ==
Homozygous mutation of Dok-7 is responsible for a form of congenital myasthenic syndrome (CMS) that is unique among disorders in this category because it affects muscles in the limbs and trunk but mostly spares the face, eyes, and functions of the mouth and pharynx (chewing, swallowing and speech). Salbutamol can be effective in relieving CMS symptoms attributable to Dok-7 mutations.
