= Salbutamol =

Short-acting bronchodilator used for acute asthma

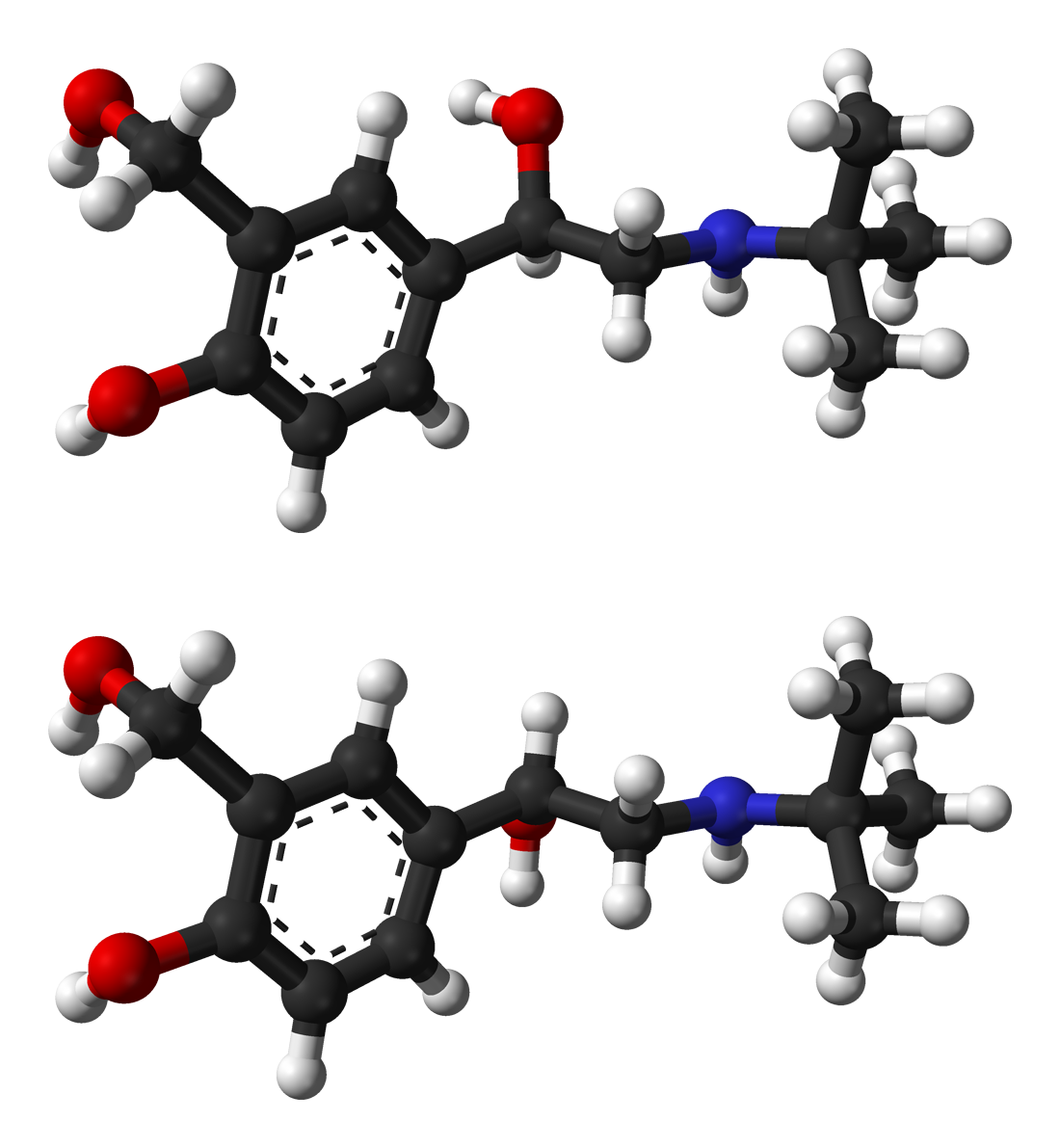
- Salbutamol (top), (R)-(−)-salbutamol (center) and (S)-(+)-salbutamol (bottom)

Clinical data
- Trade names: Ventolin, Proventil, ProAir, others
- Other names: Albuterol (USAN US)
- AHFS/Drugs.com: Monograph
- MedlinePlus: a607004
- License data: US DailyMed: Albuterol
- Pregnancy category: AU: A
- Routes of administration: By mouth, inhalation, intravenous
- Drug class: β_{2} adrenergic receptor agonist
- ATC code: R03AC02 (WHO) R03CC02 (WHO) R03AK04 (WHO) R03AK13 (WHO) R03AL02 (WHO)

Legal status
- Legal status: AU: S3/S4; CA: ℞-only; NZ: Prescription only; UK: POM (Prescription only); US: ℞-only

Pharmacokinetic data
- Metabolism: Liver
- Onset of action: < 15 min (inhalation), < 30 min (by mouth)
- Elimination half-life: 3.8–6 hrs (inhalation); 5–7.2 hrs (by mouth)
- Duration of action: 3–6 hrs (inhalation); ≤ 8 hrs (by mouth)
- Excretion: Kidney

Identifiers
- IUPAC name: (RS)-4-[2-(tert-Butylamino)-1-hydroxyethyl]-2-(hydroxymethyl)phenol
- CAS Number: 18559-94-9
- PubChem CID: 2083
- IUPHAR/BPS: 558
- DrugBank: DB01001
- ChemSpider: 1999
- UNII: QF8SVZ843E
- KEGG: D02147
- ChEBI: CHEBI:2549
- ChEMBL: ChEMBL714
- ECHA InfoCard: 100.038.552

Chemical and physical data
- Formula: C_{13}H_{21}NO_{3}
- Molar mass: 239.315 g·mol^{−1}
- 3D model (JSmol): Interactive image
- Chirality: Racemic mixture
- SMILES: CC(C)(C)NCC(C1=CC(=C(C=C1)O)CO)O
- InChI: InChI=1S/C13H21NO3/c1-13(2,3)14-7-12(17)9-4-5-11(16)10(6-9)8-15/h4-6,12,14-17H,7-8H2,1-3H3; Key:NDAUXUAQIAJITI-UHFFFAOYSA-N

Salbutamol, also known as albuterol and sold under the brand name Ventolin among others, is a medication that opens up the medium and large airways in the lungs. It is a short-acting β_{2} adrenergic receptor agonist that causes relaxation of airway smooth muscle. It is used to treat asthma, including asthma attacks and exercise-induced bronchoconstriction, as well as chronic obstructive pulmonary disease (COPD). It may also be used to treat high blood potassium levels. Salbutamol is usually used with an inhaler or nebuliser, but it is also available in a pill, liquid, and intravenous solution. Onset of action of the inhaled version is typically within 15 minutes and lasts for two to six hours.

Common side effects include shakiness, headache, fast heart rate, dizziness, and feeling anxious. Serious side effects may include worsening bronchospasm, irregular heartbeat, and low blood potassium levels. Its use during pregnancy and breastfeeding is widespread and no evidence exists to suggest it is unsafe.

Salbutamol was patented in 1966 in Britain and became commercially available in the United Kingdom in 1969. It was approved for medical use in the United States in 1982. It is on the World Health Organization's List of Essential Medicines. Salbutamol is available as a generic medication. In 2024, it was the sixth most commonly prescribed medication in the United States, with more than 61 million prescriptions.

== Medical uses ==
Salbutamol is typically used to treat bronchospasm (due to any cause—allergic asthma or exercise-induced), as well as chronic obstructive pulmonary disease. It is also one of the most common medicines used in rescue inhalers (short-term bronchodilators to alleviate asthma attacks).

As a β_{2} agonist, salbutamol also has use in obstetrics. Intravenous salbutamol can be used as a tocolytic to relax the uterine smooth muscle to delay premature labour. While preferred over agents such as atosiban and ritodrine, its role has largely been replaced by the calcium channel blocker nifedipine, which is more effective and better tolerated.

Salbutamol has been used to treat acute hyperkalemia, as it stimulates potassium flow into cells, thus lowering the potassium in the blood.

Two recent studies have suggested that salbutamol reduces the symptoms of newborns and adolescents with myasthenia gravis and transient neonatal myasthenia gravis.

== Adverse effects ==
The most common side effects are fine tremor, anxiety, headache, muscle cramps, dry mouth, and palpitation. Other symptoms may include tachycardia, arrhythmia, flushing of the skin, myocardial ischemia (rare), and disturbances of sleep and behaviour. Rarely occurring, but of importance, are allergic reactions of paradoxical bronchospasms, urticaria (hives), angioedema, hypotension, and collapse. High doses or prolonged use may cause hypokalemia, which is of concern especially in patients with kidney failure and those on certain diuretics and xanthine derivatives.

Salbutamol metered dose inhalers have been described as the "single biggest source of carbon emissions from NHS medicines prescribing" due to the propellants used in the inhalers. Dry powder inhalers are recommended as a low-carbon alternative.

== Pharmacology ==
The tertiary butyl group in salbutamol makes it more selective for β_{2} receptors, which are the predominant receptors on the bronchial smooth muscles. Activation of these receptors causes adenylyl cyclase to convert ATP to cAMP, beginning the signalling cascade that ends with the inhibition of myosin phosphorylation and lowering the intracellular concentration of calcium ions (myosin phosphorylation and calcium ions are necessary for muscle contractions). The increase in cAMP also inhibits inflammatory cells in the airway, such as basophils, eosinophils, and most especially mast cells, from releasing inflammatory mediators and cytokines. Salbutamol and other β_{2} receptor agonists also increase the conductance of channels sensitive to calcium and potassium ions, leading to hyperpolarisation and relaxation of bronchial smooth muscles.

Salbutamol is either filtered out by the kidneys directly or is first metabolised into the 4′-O-sulfate, which is excreted in the urine.

== Chemistry ==
(R)-(−)-salbutamol (top) and (S)-(+)-salbutamol (bottom)

Salbutamol is sold as a racemic mixture. The (R)-(−)-enantiomer (CIP nomenclature) is shown in the image at right (top), and is responsible for the pharmacologic activity; the (S)-(+)-enantiomer (bottom) blocks metabolic pathways associated with elimination of itself and of the pharmacologically active enantiomer (R). The slower metabolism of the (S)-(+)-enantiomer also causes it to accumulate in the lungs, which can cause airway hyperreactivity and inflammation. Potential formulation of the R form as an enantiopure drug is complicated by the fact that the stereochemistry is not stable, but rather the compound undergoes racemisation within a few days to weeks, depending on pH.

The direct separation of Salbutamol enantiomers and the control of enantiomeric purity has been described by thin-layer chromatography.

=== Synthesis ===
The chemical synthesis of salbutamol has been described: Perhaps the most fabled of the available methods starts with the Fries rearrangement of aspirin, but many more methods are discussed in the review.

== History ==
Salbutamol was discovered in 1966, by a research team led by David Jack at the Allen and Hanburys laboratory (now a subsidiary of Glaxo) in Ware, Hertfordshire, England, and was launched as Ventolin in 1969.

The 1972 Munich Olympics were the first Olympics where anti-doping measures were deployed, and at that time β_{2} agonists were considered to be stimulants with high risk of abuse for doping. Inhaled salbutamol was banned from those games, but by 1986 was permitted (although oral β_{2} agonists were not). After a steep rise in the number of athletes taking β_{2} agonists for asthma in the 1990s, Olympic athletes were required to provide proof that they had asthma in order to be allowed to use inhaled β_{2} agonists.

In early 2020, the US Food and Drug Administration (FDA) approved the first generic versions of major albuterol sulfate inhaler brands, Perrigo Pharmaceutical's generic of ProAir HFA in February 2020 and Cipla Limited's generic of Ventolin HFA in April 2020.

== Society and culture ==
=== Names ===
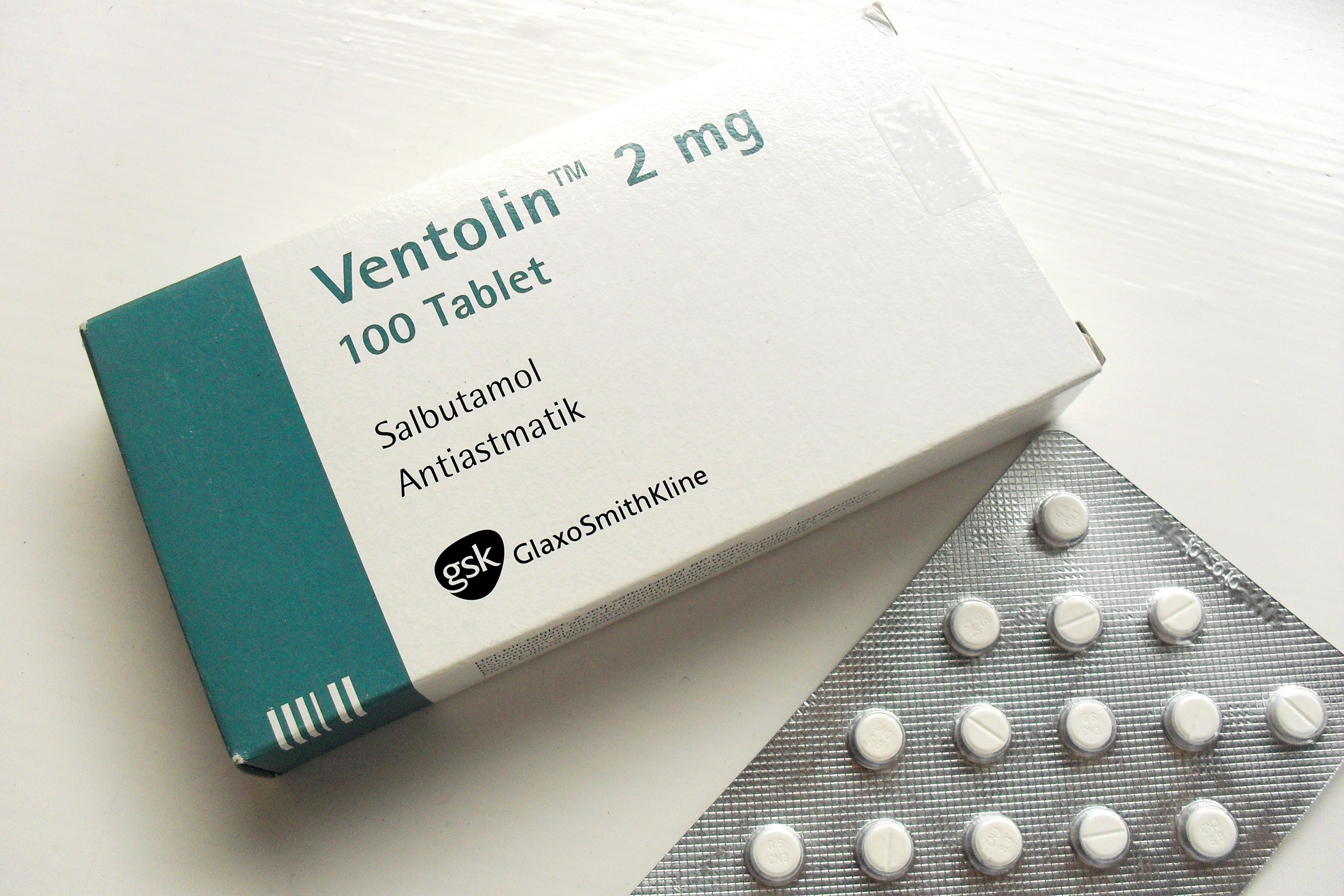
Ventolin 2 mg tablets made by GSK (Turkey)

Salbutamol is the international nonproprietary name (INN) while albuterol is the United States Adopted Name (USAN). The drug is usually manufactured and distributed as the sulfate salt (salbutamol sulfate).

It was first sold by Allen & Hanburys (UK) under the brand name Ventolin, and has been used for the treatment of asthma ever since. The drug is marketed under many names.

=== Misuse ===
Albuterol and other beta-2 adrenergic agonists are used by some recreational bodybuilders.

=== Doping ===
As of 2011 there was no evidence that an increase in physical performance occurs after inhaling salbutamol, but there are various reports for benefit when delivered orally or intravenously. In spite of this, salbutamol required "a declaration of Use in accordance with the International Standard for Therapeutic Use Exemptions" under the 2010 WADA prohibited list. This requirement was relaxed when the 2011 list was published to permit the use of "salbutamol (maximum 1600 micrograms over 24 hours) and salmeterol when taken by inhalation in accordance with the manufacturers' recommended therapeutic regimen."

Abuse of the drug may be confirmed by detection of its presence in plasma or urine, typically exceeding 1,000 ng/mL. The window of detection for urine testing is on the order of just 24 hours, given the relatively short elimination half-life of the drug, estimated at between 5 and 6 hours following oral administration of 4 mg.

== Research ==
Salbutamol has been studied in subtypes of congenital myasthenic syndrome associated with mutations in Dok-7.

It has also been tested in a trial aimed at treatment of spinal muscular atrophy; it is speculated to modulate the alternative splicing of the SMN2 gene, increasing the amount of the SMN protein, the deficiency of which is regarded as a cause of the disease.

Albuterol increases energy expenditure by 10 to 15 per cent at a therapeutic dose for asthma and around 25 per cent at a higher, oral dose. In several human studies, albuterol increased lean body mass, reduced fat mass, and caused lipolysis; it has been studied for use as an anti-obesity and anti-muscle wasting medication when taken orally.

== Veterinary use ==
Salbutamol's low toxicity makes it safe for other animals and thus is the medication of choice for treating acute airway obstruction in most species. It is usually used to treat bronchospasm or coughs in cats and dogs and used as a bronchodilator in horses with recurrent airway obstruction; it can also be used in emergencies to treat asthmatic cats.

Toxic effects require an extremely high dose, and most overdoses are due to dogs chewing on and puncturing an inhaler or nebuliser vial.
