= Recurrent airway obstruction =

Horse disease

Recurrent airway obstruction, also known as broken wind, heaves, wind-broke horse, or sometimes by the term usually reserved for humans, chronic obstructive pulmonary disease or disorder (COPD) – it is a respiratory disease or chronic condition of horses involving an allergic bronchitis characterised by wheezing, coughing and laboured breathing.

== Signs and symptoms ==
Symptoms include, primarily, increased respiratory effort and dyspnea, especially in response to strenuous exercise. In some cases (secondarily), the horse may present with acute severe dyspnea, such that it really struggles to inspire sufficient air. This is a veterinary emergency.

In addition, a soft, moist cough may be seen, most commonly in association with exercise or eating. This cough may be productive, with expectoration of thick, viscous sputum.

There may also be an audible wheeze.

In chronic cases, a "heave line" may be visible on the ventral abdomen. This is caused by hypertrophy of the extrinsic respiratory muscles.

If any of these symptoms are observed, veterinary advice should be sought. The veterinarian will usually auscultate (listen to the horse's chest with a stethoscope) to attempt to detect adventitious lung sounds. If these are very quiet, a rebreathing bag may be used - a plastic bag over the nose to intensify the horse's respiratory effort and hence the sounds. This procedure can be dangerous and should not be attempted by non-professionals.

Blood gas analysis may also be carried out, although it is rarely required.

In some cases, a bronchoalveolar lavage may be carried out - an endoscope is used to look down the trachea, and mucus and cells are washed out of the lower airways for analysis. Typically, a BAL recovers an abnormally high percentage of neutrophils from an RAO horse - up to 50 or 70% in severe cases.

== Causes ==
An allergic reaction to certain otherwise innocuous substances - allergens, typically dust and mold spores (e.g. Aspergillus spp.). It is therefore most common in horses fed on hay and bedded on straw. Endotoxins from organisms in the bedding and feedstuffs may also play a role.

The condition is most common in the Northern Hemisphere - it is rare in the South. This is probably because northern horses are more likely to be overwintered in stables or barn, and therefore become sensitised more readily. In contrast to human asthma (which it otherwise resembles), RAO is associated primarily with neutrophil mediated inflammation, and IgE and mast cells are much less important in the pathophysiology.

In animals maintained in stable during several hours of the day, other causes, like inhalation of ammonia (mainly from urine), a gas that is potentially damaging to the lungs, should also be considered.

Another point to think, is about liver dysfunctions, which could lead and/ or be associated with the occurrence of allergies. Remembering that liver dysfunctions are commonly present in mold intoxications.

NOTE: A similar condition, Summer Pasture Associated RAO also exists. In this case, the allergens are derived from fodder and pasture. This is more common is summer, and management is reversed: horses should be stabled in well ventilated areas.

== Treatment ==
If a horse is severely dyspnoeic (that is, struggling to breathe), the most important measure to take is to remove it from the stable or barn into fresh air. This can be a life-saving measure in an acute attack.

As RAO is primarily a management condition, primary treatment is managemental. Where possible, the horse should be turned out to pasture. When removed from the allergens in the stable, the symptoms will usually subside, although they will recur if the horse is stabled again at a later date.

If this is not practical, certain alterations to stable routine may be effective. The aim is to minimise dust and maximise air quality in the stable. This may be achieved by soaking hay or feeding a dust-free alternative (such as haylage). The length of time to soak hay for the maximum benefit is debated; however, approximately 30 minutes appears to be the current consensus.

Feeding from the ground is often thought to be more beneficial than in a hay net, as this allows any mucus to drain out of the lungs. Those horses that must continue to be stabled are normally bedded on paper, or a combination of rubber matting and paper. Straw and wood shavings contain dust and may irritate the condition further, although some modern "low dust" shavings are thought to be better than straw.

Despite management changes, pharmacological intervention is often required, and almost invariably in severe cases. This breaks down into a number of categories:

1) Bronchodilators: Often, bronchodilators are the mainstay of therapy. One of the most common is clenbuterol, either as an oral medication administered twice daily in feed, or via the intravenous route. Alternatively, aerosolised drugs, such as salbutamol or clenbuterol, may be used. Clenbuterol also has anti-inflammatory actions, and is therefore often preferred. Other bronchodilators that may be used include aminophylline, although this may lead to excitation, and is only effective in 50% of cases, or ipratropium (which is relatively short acting at 4–6 hours duration).

In an emergency, intravenous clenbuterol or atropine may be used, but care must be exercised with atropine, as it may predispose to adverse systemic side effects such as mydriasis, excitement, GI stasis and colic.

2) Corticosteroids: Oral steroids such as prednisolone are commonly used; however, side effects are common, and the horse may be predisposed to laminitis. Therefore, the use of aerosolised steroids via an equine inhaler are becoming more common. This route of administration reduces the dose required, and the risk of side effects. Originally, beclomethasone was used, but newer compounds are available now, such as fluticasone propionate.

3) Mast cell stabilisers: Cromoglycate has been used, but this is may or may not be fully effective, as in RAO mast cells have only a peripheral role in the pathophysiology.

Care should be taken with these drugs in competition horses, as many of them are forbidden substances under racing and FEI rules.

4) Hay Steamers: A relatively new method of dealing with RAO with horses is to thoroughly Steam the Hay in a commercially available steamer. Feedback from users is very encouraging on the relief factor obtained from RAO. Consistency in feeding horses is important and the hay is just another feed component. A great number of horses suffer from respiratory conditions that is a direct result of the hay they are feeding on. Stored hay contains dust and fungal spores that can cause irritation and inflammation, that can lead to COPD, airway and digestive conditions.

5) Liver Function Monitoring: because mold may potentially cause liver damage, it is advisable to evaluate parameters related to liver health and, if possible, to adopt hepatoprotective foods or medicines, as well as other measures favorable to the reestablishment of liver functions

== Prognosis ==
RAO often limits the horse's ability to work, and it may find strenuous activity difficult. However, with prompt diagnosis and treatment the condition can be managed successfully.
