= Repetitive nerve stimulation =

Medical diagnostic test

Repetitive nerve stimulation is a variant of the nerve conduction study where electrical stimulation is delivered to a motor nerve repeatedly several times per second. By observing the change in the muscle electrical response (CMAP) after several stimulations, a physician can assess for the presence of a neuromuscular junction disease, and differentiate between presynaptic and postsynaptic conditions. The test was first described by German neurologist Friedrich Jolly in 1895, and is also known as Jolly's test.

== Medical uses ==
Repetitive nerve stimulation is used to diagnose neuromuscular junction (NMJ) disorders, the most common of which is myasthenia gravis. A decremental response (a smaller and smaller muscle response with each repetitive stimulus) is abnormal and indicates NMJ dysfunction. This can be further confirmed if the response normalizes after administration of edrophonium or neostigmine.

== Mechanism ==
Stimulation of a motor neuron causes it to release acetylcholine, which is stored up in vesicles at the axon terminal. The acetylcholine binds to nicotinic receptors on the muscle fiber, which open sodium channels and depolarizes the muscle cell.

As nerve stimulation is rapidly repeated, the acetylcholine stored in the nerve terminal is gradually depleted, and there is a slight weakening of the acetylcholine signal sent to the muscle fiber, resulting in smaller endplate potentials (EPPs). In normal muscle, although the EPPs become smaller with repetitive stimulation, they remain above the threshold needed to trigger muscle contraction. In myasthenia gravis, where many of the acetylcholine receptors are blocked, the EPP may exceed the threshold initially, but quickly falls below threshold with repetitive stimulation, resulting in the muscle fiber failing to contract. As one by one the muscle fibers fail to contract, the overall CMAP measured grows smaller and smaller, leading to the pathologic decremental response.

== Preparation ==
As with all nerve conduction studies, the body part tested should be clean, free of lotions and conductive substances, with jewelry removed. It is best to advise patients to refrain from taking acetylcholinesterase inhibitors (e.g., Pyridostigmine Mestinon) for 6–8 hours before the study, unless medically contraindicated. These agents make more ACH available to bind at the ACHRs and may potentially diminished CMAP decrement, resulting in a normal study (false negative).

== Procedure ==
If the electrode is not properly immobilized, the result is a change in the CMAP amplitude which may lead to misinterpretation. So the recording electrodes should be secured well with tape, the stimulator secured with a Velcro strap and the entire hand with pad or board. The goal is to minimize the movement of the limb. Impulse transmission: Submaximal stimulation can give artifactual decrement or increment in the CMAP amplitude. So always check to ensure that the stimulus is supramaximal before beginning of RNS.

A peripheral nerve is electrically stimulated, and the amplitude of the CMAP is recorded at rest and after a short voluntary activation. The stimulation frequency is 3 Hz, the number of stimuli 10. The result is reported as the difference in amplitude of the CMAP between stimulation one and four (in %). The area value changes typically in parallel, but is not reported. If there is a major difference between amplitude and area decrement, technical factors should be considered.

== Interpretation of results ==
Recording protocol:

1. Recording at rest
2. Immediately after activation ( 20 s activation default, 10 s in severe cases)
3. 1 minute after activation
4. 3 minutes after activation

== See also ==
- Nerve conduction study
- Myasthenia gravis
