= CHRNE =

Protein-coding gene

Identifiers
- Aliases: CHRNE, ACHRE, CMS1D, CMS1E, CMS2A, FCCMS, SCCMS, CMS4A, CMS4B, CMS4C, cholinergic receptor nicotinic epsilon subunit
- External IDs: OMIM: 100725; MGI: 87894; GeneCards: CHRNE
Available structures
PDB	Ortholog search: PDBe RCSB
PDB	List of PDB id codes 2DF9

Gene location (Human)
Chr.	Chromosome 17 (human)
Band	17p13.2	Start	4,897,771 bp
Band	17p13.2	End	4,934,438 bp

Gene location (Mouse)
Chr.	Chromosome 11 (mouse)
Band	11 B3|11 43.14 cM	Start	70,505,709 bp
Band	11 B3|11 43.14 cM	End	70,510,042 bp
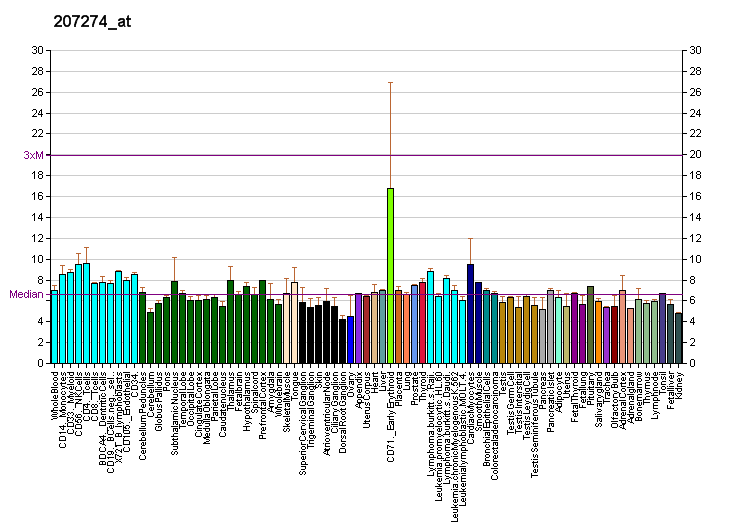
RNA expression pattern
Bgee	Human / Mouse (ortholog); Top expressed in: right auricle of heart; anterior pituitary; cardiac muscle tissue of right atrium; granulocyte; testicle; right lobe of liver; skin of leg; body of pancreas; stromal cell of endometrium; blood / Top expressed in: spermatid; spermatocyte; extraocular muscle; seminiferous tubule; muscle of thigh; ankle; embryo; quadriceps femoris muscle; lip; muscle of leg; More reference expression data
BioGPS	More reference expression data
Gene ontology
Molecular function	acetylcholine binding; cation transmembrane transporter activity; acetylcholine receptor activity; ion channel activity; extracellular ligand-gated ion channel activity; ligand-gated ion channel activity; acetylcholine-gated cation-selective channel activity; transmembrane signaling receptor activity; transmitter-gated ion channel activity involved in regulation of postsynaptic membrane potential
Cellular component	integral component of membrane; postsynaptic membrane; membrane; plasma membrane; synapse; integral component of plasma membrane; cell junction; acetylcholine-gated channel complex; neuromuscular junction; integral component of postsynaptic specialization membrane; neuron projection
Biological process	muscle contraction; regulation of membrane potential; response to nicotine; synaptic transmission, cholinergic; ion transport; cation transmembrane transport; neuromuscular synaptic transmission; signal transduction; ion transmembrane transport; regulation of postsynaptic membrane potential; excitatory postsynaptic potential; chemical synaptic transmission; nervous system process
Sources:Amigo / QuickGO
Orthologs
Databases	NCBI: entry; OMA: entry
Species	Human	Mouse
Entrez	1145	11448
Ensembl	ENSG00000108556	ENSMUSG00000014609
UniProt	Q04844	P20782
RefSeq (mRNA)	NM_000080	NM_009603
RefSeq (protein)	NP_000071	NP_033733
Location (UCSC)	Chr 17: 4.9 – 4.93 Mb	Chr 11: 70.51 – 70.51 Mb
PubMed search
- Wikidata
View/Edit Human	View/Edit Mouse

Acetylcholine receptor subunit epsilon is a protein that in humans is encoded by the CHRNE gene.

Acetylcholine receptors at mature mammalian neuromuscular junctions are pentameric protein complexes composed of four subunits in the ratio of two alpha subunits to one beta, one epsilon, and one delta subunit. The acetylcholine receptor changes subunit composition shortly after birth when the epsilon subunit replaces the gamma subunit seen in embryonic receptors. Mutations in the epsilon subunit are associated with congenital myasthenic syndrome.

== Role in health and disease ==
Congenital myasthenic syndrome (CMS) is associated with genetic defects that affect proteins of the neuromuscular junction. Postsynaptic defects are the most frequent cause of CMS and often result in abnormalities in the acetylcholine receptor (AChR). The majority of mutations causing CMS are found in the AChR subunits genes.

Out of all mutations associated with CMS, more than half are mutations in one of the four genes encoding the adult AChR subunits. Mutations of the AChR often result in endplate deficiency. The most common AChR gene mutation that underlies CMS is the mutation of the CHRNE gene. The CHRNE gene codes for the epsilon subunit of the AChR. Most mutations are autosomal recessive loss-of-function mutations and as a result there is endplate AChR deficiency. CHRNE is associated with changing the kinetic properties of the AChR. One type of mutation of the epsilon subunit of the AChR introduces an arginine (Arg) into the binding site at the α/ε subunit interface of the receptor. The addition of a cationic Arg into the anionic environment of the AChR binding site greatly reduces the kinetic properties of the receptor. The result of the newly introduced ARG is a 30-fold reduction of agonist affinity, 75-fold reduction of gating efficiency, and an extremely weakened channel opening probability. This type of mutation results in an extremely fatal form of CMS.

== See also ==
- Nicotinic acetylcholine receptor
