= Congenital myasthenic syndrome =

Human disease

Congenital myasthenic syndromes
- Specialty: Neurology

Congenital myasthenic syndrome (CMS) is an inherited neuromuscular disorder caused by defects of several types at the neuromuscular junction. The effects of the disease are similar to Lambert-Eaton Syndrome and myasthenia gravis, the difference being that CMS is not an autoimmune disorder. There are only 600 known family cases of this disorder and it is estimated that its overall frequency in the human population is 1 in 200,000.

It is more common among North Africans and Romani people.

== Types ==
The types of CMS are classified into three categories: presynaptic, postsynaptic, and synaptic.

- Presynaptic symptoms include brief stops in breathing, weakness of the eye, mouth, and throat muscles. These symptoms often result in double vision and difficulty chewing and swallowing.
- Postsynaptic symptoms in infants include severe muscle weakness, feeding and respiratory problems, and delays in the ability to sit, crawl, and walk.
- Synaptic symptoms include early childhood feeding and respiratory problems, reduced mobility, curvature of the spine, and weakness, which causes a delay in motor milestones.

== Presentation ==
The onset of symptoms for all ages may include droopy eyelids. A particular form of postsynaptic CMS (slow-channel CMS) includes severe weakness beginning in infancy or childhood that progresses to respiratory problems, and leads to loss of mobility in adolescence or later life.

== Mechanisms ==
=== Postsynaptic CMS ===
CMS is associated with genetic defects that affect proteins of the neuromuscular junction. Postsynaptic defects are the most frequent cause of CMS and often result in abnormalities in the acetylcholine receptor (AChR). In the neuromuscular junction there is a vital pathway that maintains synaptic structure and results in the aggregation and localization of AChR on the postsynaptic folds. This pathway consists of agrin, muscle-specific tyrosine kinase (MuSK), acetylcholine receptors (AChRs) and the AChR-clustering protein rapsyn, encoded by the RAPSN gene. The vast majority of mutations causing CMS are found in the AChR subunits and rapsyn genes.

Out of all mutations associated with CMS, more than half are mutations in one of the four genes encoding the adult acetylcholine receptor (AChR) subunits. Mutations of the AChR often result in endplate deficiency. Most of the mutations of the AChR are mutations of the CHRNE gene. The CHRNE gene codes for the epsilon subunit of the AChR. Most mutations are autosomal recessive loss-of-function mutations and as a result there is endplate AChR deficiency. CHRNE is associated with changing the kinetic properties of the AChR. One type of mutation of the epsilon subunit of the AChR introduces an Arginine into the binding site at the α/ε subunit interface of the receptor. The addition of a cationic Arg into the anionic environment of the AChR binding site greatly reduces the kinetic properties of the receptor. The result of the newly introduced Arg is a 30-fold reduction of agonist affinity, 75-fold reduction of gating efficiency, and an extremely weakened channel opening probability. This type of mutation results in an extremely fatal form of CMS.

Another common underlying mechanism of CMS is the mutation of the rapsyn protein, coded by the RAPSN gene. Rapsyn interacts directly with the AChRs and plays a vital role in agrin-induced clustering of the AChR. Without rapsyn, functional synapses cannot be created, as the membrane folds do not form properly. Patients with CMS-related mutations of the rapsyn protein typically are either homozygous for N88K or heterozygous for N88K and a second mutation. The major effect of the mutation N88K in rapsyn is to reduce the stability of AChR clusters. The second mutation can be a determining factor in the severity of the disease.

Studies have shown that most patients with CMS that have rapsyn mutations carry the common mutation N88K on at least one allele. However, research has revealed that there is a small population of patients who do not carry the N88K mutation on either of their alleles, but instead have different mutations of the RAPSN gene that codes for rapsyn on both of their alleles. Two novel missense mutations that have been found are R164C and L283P; the result is a decrease in co-clustering of AChR with rapsyn. A third mutation is the intronic base alteration IVS1-15C>A, which causes abnormal splicing of RAPSN RNA. These results show that diagnostic screening for CMS mutations of the RAPSN gene cannot be based exclusively on the detection of N88K mutations.

Dok-7 is a postsynaptic protein that binds and activates MuSK protein, which then leads to AChR clustering and typical folding of the postsynaptic membrane. Mutations of Dok-7 are yet another underlying mechanism of postsynaptic CMS.

== Diagnosis ==
Congenital myasthenic syndrome (CMS) is "often difficult to diagnose because of a broad differential diagnosis and lack of specific laboratory findings. Identification of the underlying mutation is critical, as certain mutations lead to treatment-responsive conditions while others do not." Whole exome sequencing (WES) is often used as a diagnostic tool that allows for the "initiation of specific treatment".

== Management ==
Treatment depends on the form (category) of the disease. Although symptoms are similar to myasthenia gravis, treatments used in MG are not useful in CMS. MG is treated with immunosuppressants, but CMS is not an autoimmune disorder. Instead, CMS is genetic and responds to other forms of drug treatments. A form of presynaptic CMS is caused by an insufficient release of acetylcholine (ACh) and is treated with cholinesterase inhibitors.

Postsynaptic fast-channel CMS, in which ACh receptors do not stay open long enough, is treated with cholinesterase inhibitors and 3,4-diaminopyridine. In the U.S., the more stable phosphate salt formulation of 3,4-diaminopyridine (amifampridine phosphate) is under development as an orphan drug for CMS and is available to eligible patients at no cost under an expanded access program. Postsynaptic slow-channel CMS is treated with quinidine or fluoxetine, which blocks the ACh receptor.

Ephedrine, a β(2)-adrenergic receptor agonist with alpha activity, has been tested on patients in clinical trials and appears to be an effective treatment for DOK7 CMS. Most patients tolerate this type of treatment and improvements in strength can be substantial. The effect of ephedrine is delayed and the improvement occurs over a period of months.

Salbutamol, a selective β(2)-adrenergic receptor agonist, has been found, in adults, to have fewer side effects than Ephedrine and to be more easily obtained in some countries. It has been trialed in children with positive results

As of 2022, the standard of care for DOK7 CMS is either ephedrine or salbutamol.

== See also ==
- Congenital disorder
- Myasthenia gravis
- Lambert-Eaton syndrome
