= Agrin =

Mammalian protein found in humans

AGRN
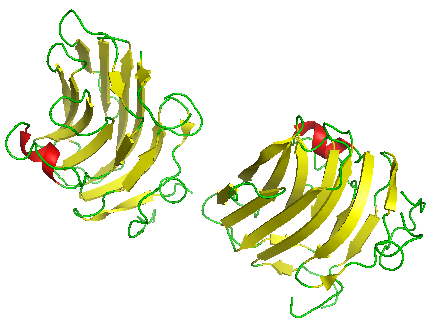

Identifiers
- Aliases: AGRN, CMS8, CMSPPD, agrin
- External IDs: OMIM: 103320; MGI: 87961; GeneCards: AGRN

Gene location (Human)
Chr.	Chromosome 1 (human)
Band	1p36.33	Start	1,020,120 bp
Band	1p36.33	End	1,056,118 bp

Gene location (Mouse)
Chr.	Chromosome 4 (mouse)
Band	4 E2|4 88.55 cM	Start	156,249,747 bp
Band	4 E2|4 88.55 cM	End	156,281,945 bp
RNA expression pattern
Bgee	Human / Mouse (ortholog); Top expressed in: right uterine tube; renal medulla; decidua; stromal cell of endometrium; left lobe of thyroid gland; right lobe of thyroid gland; right frontal lobe; human kidney; body of pancreas; ganglionic eminence / Top expressed in: left lung lobe; renal corpuscle; medullary collecting duct; external carotid artery; ventricular zone; vestibular sensory epithelium; vas deferens; efferent ductule; Gonadal ridge; molar; More reference expression data
BioGPS	n/a
Gene ontology
Molecular function	dystroglycan binding; structural constituent of cytoskeleton; protein binding; heparan sulfate proteoglycan binding; chondroitin sulfate binding; laminin binding; sialic acid binding; calcium ion binding; extracellular matrix structural constituent
Cellular component	integral component of membrane; membrane; extracellular matrix; plasma membrane; synapse; extracellular region; cell junction; lysosomal lumen; Golgi lumen; extracellular exosome; cytosol; basement membrane; collagen-containing extracellular matrix
Biological process	G protein-coupled acetylcholine receptor signaling pathway; glycosaminoglycan metabolic process; clustering of voltage-gated sodium channels; cell differentiation; positive regulation of synaptic assembly at neuromuscular junction; synapse organization; extracellular matrix organization; receptor clustering; retinoid metabolic process; multicellular organism development; positive regulation of GTPase activity; glycosaminoglycan catabolic process; glycosaminoglycan biosynthetic process; positive regulation of filopodium assembly; signal transduction; positive regulation of transcription by RNA polymerase II; cytoskeleton organization; regulation of synaptic assembly at neuromuscular junction; axon guidance; neuromuscular junction development; animal organ morphogenesis; tissue development
Sources:Amigo / QuickGO
Orthologs
Databases	NCBI: entry; OMA: entry
Species	Human	Mouse
Entrez	375790	11603
Ensembl	ENSG00000188157	ENSMUSG00000041936
UniProt	O00468	A2ASQ1
RefSeq (mRNA)	NM_001305275; NM_198576; NM_001364727	NM_021604; NM_001369026; NM_001369027
RefSeq (protein)	NP_001292204; NP_940978; NP_001351656	NP_067617; NP_001355955; NP_001355956
Location (UCSC)	Chr 1: 1.02 – 1.06 Mb	Chr 4: 156.25 – 156.28 Mb
PubMed search
- Wikidata
View/Edit Human	View/Edit Mouse

Agrin NtA domain

Identifiers
- Symbol: NtA
- Pfam: PF03146
- InterPro: IPR004850
- SCOP2: 1jc7 / SCOPe / SUPFAM
Available protein structures:
- PDB: IPR004850 PF03146 (ECOD; PDBsum)
- AlphaFold: IPR004850; PF03146

Agrin is a large proteoglycan whose best-characterised role is in the development of the neuromuscular junction during embryogenesis. Agrin is named based on its involvement in the aggregation of acetylcholine receptors during synaptogenesis. In humans, this protein is encoded by the AGRN gene.

This protein has nine domains homologous to protease inhibitors. It may also have functions in other tissues and during other stages of development. It is a major proteoglycan component in the glomerular basement membrane and may play a role in the renal filtration and cell-matrix interactions.

Agrin functions by activating the MuSK protein (for Muscle-Specific Kinase), which is a receptor tyrosine kinase required for the formation and maintenance of the neuromuscular junction. Agrin is required to activate MuSK. Agrin is also required for neuromuscular junction formation.

== Discovery ==
Agrin was first identified at the U.J. McMahan laboratory, Stanford University.

== Mechanism of action ==
During development in humans, the growing end of motor neuron axons secrete a protein called agrin. When secreted, agrin binds to several receptors on the surface of skeletal muscle. The receptor which appears to be required for the formation of the neuromuscular junction (NMJ) is called the MuSK receptor (Muscle specific kinase). MuSK is a receptor tyrosine kinase—meaning that it induces cellular signaling by causing the addition of phosphate molecules to particular tyrosines on itself and on proteins that bind the cytoplasmic domain of the receptor.

In addition to MuSK, agrin binds several other proteins on the surface of muscle, including dystroglycan and laminin. It is seen that these additional binding steps are required to stabilize the NMJ.

The requirement for Agrin and MuSK in the formation of the NMJ was demonstrated primarily by knockout mouse studies. In mice that are deficient for either protein, the neuromuscular junction does not form. Many other proteins also comprise the NMJ, and are required to maintain its integrity. For example, MuSK also binds a protein called "dishevelled" (Dvl), which is in the Wnt signalling pathway. Dvl is additionally required for MuSK-mediated clustering of AChRs, since inhibition of Dvl blocks clustering.

== Signaling ==
The nerve secretes agrin, resulting in phosphorylation of the MuSK receptor.

It seems that the MuSK receptor recruits casein kinase 2, which is required for clustering.

A protein called rapsyn is then recruited to the primary MuSK scaffold, to induce the additional clustering of acetylcholine receptors (AChR). This is thought of as the secondary scaffold. A protein called Dok-7 has shown to be additionally required for the formation of the secondary scaffold; it is apparently recruited after MuSK phosphorylation and before acetylcholine receptors are clustered.

== Structure ==
There are three potential heparan sulfate (HS) attachment sites within the primary structure of agrin, but it is thought that only two of these actually carry HS chains when the protein is expressed.

In fact, one study concluded that at least two attachment sites are necessary by inducing synthetic agents. Since agrin fragments induce acetylcholine receptor aggregation as well as phosphorylation of the MuSK receptor, researchers spliced them and found that the variant did not trigger phosphorylation. It has also been shown that the G3 domain of agrin is very plastic, meaning it can discriminate between binding partners for a better fit.

Heparan sulfate glycosaminoglycans covalently linked to the agrin protein have been shown to play a role in the clustering of AChR. Interference in the correct formation of heparan sulfate through the addition of chlorate to skeletal muscle cell culture results in a decrease in the frequency of spontaneous acetylcholine receptor (AChR) clustering. It may be that rather than solely binding directly to the agrin protein core a number of components of the secondary scaffold may also interact with its heparan sulfate side-chains.

A role in the retention of anionic macromolecules within the vasculature has also been suggested for agrin-linked HS at the glomerular or alveolar basement membrane.

== Functions ==
Agrin may play an important role in the basement membrane of the microvasculature as well as in synaptic plasticity. Also, agrin may be involved in blood–brain barrier formation and/or function and it influences Aβ homeostasis.

== Research ==
Agrin is investigated in relation to osteoarthritis. In addition, by its ability to activate the Hippo signaling pathway, agrin is emerging as a key proteoglycan in the tumor microenvironment.

== Clinical significance ==
AGRN gene mutation leads to congenital myasthenic syndromes and myasthenia gravis.

A recent genome-wide association study has found that genetic variations in AGRN are associated with late-onset sporadic Alzheimer's disease. These genetic variations alter β-amyloid homeostasis contributing to its accumulation and plaque formation.
