= RAPSN =

Protein-coding gene in the species Homo sapiens

Identifiers
- Aliases: RAPSN, RAPSYN, RNF205, CMS11, CMS4C, FADS, receptor associated protein of the synapse, FADS2
- External IDs: OMIM: 601592; MGI: 99422; GeneCards: RAPSN

Gene location (Human)
Chr.	Chromosome 11 (human)
Band	11p11.2	Start	47,437,764 bp
Band	11p11.2	End	47,449,143 bp

Gene location (Mouse)
Chr.	Chromosome 2 (mouse)
Band	2 E1|2 50.44 cM	Start	90,865,965 bp
Band	2 E1|2 50.44 cM	End	90,876,074 bp
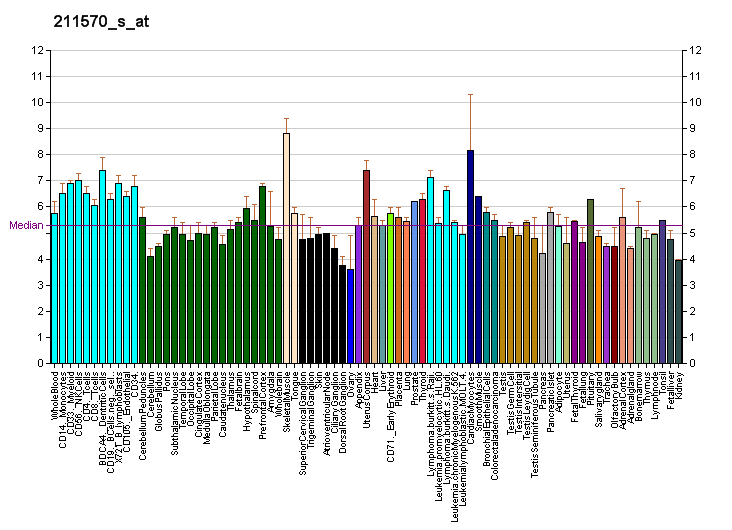
RNA expression pattern
Bgee	Human / Mouse (ortholog); Top expressed in: muscle of thigh; testicle; gastrocnemius muscle; Skeletal muscle tissue of rectus abdominis; muscle of arm; apex of heart; biceps brachii; deltoid muscle; quadriceps femoris muscle; glutes / Top expressed in: muscle tissue; quadriceps femoris muscle; skeletal muscle tissue; muscle of thigh; thoracic diaphragm; heart; secondary oocyte; primary oocyte; esophagus; lens; More reference expression data
BioGPS	More reference expression data
Gene ontology
Molecular function	acetylcholine receptor binding; protein-membrane adaptor activity; metal ion binding; ionotropic glutamate receptor binding
Cellular component	cytoplasm; cell junction; neuromuscular junction; Golgi apparatus; postsynaptic membrane; synapse; cytoskeleton; membrane; centrosome; cytosol; plasma membrane; postsynaptic specialization membrane
Biological process	positive regulation of neuromuscular synaptic transmission; synaptic transmission, cholinergic; positive regulation of neuron apoptotic process; regulation of postsynaptic membrane organization; chemical synaptic transmission; establishment of protein localization to postsynaptic membrane
Sources:Amigo / QuickGO
Orthologs
Databases	NCBI: entry; OMA: entry
Species	Human	Mouse
Entrez	5913	19400
Ensembl	ENSG00000165917	ENSMUSG00000002104
UniProt	Q13702	P12672
RefSeq (mRNA)	NM_005055; NM_032645	NM_009023
RefSeq (protein)	NP_005046; NP_116034	NP_033049
Location (UCSC)	Chr 11: 47.44 – 47.45 Mb	Chr 2: 90.87 – 90.88 Mb
PubMed search
- Wikidata
View/Edit Human	View/Edit Mouse

43 kDa receptor-associated protein of the synapse (rapsyn) is a protein that in humans is encoded by the RAPSN gene.

== Function ==
This protein belongs to a family of proteins that are receptor associated proteins of the synapse. It contains a conserved cAMP-dependent protein kinase phosphorylation site. It is believed to play some role in anchoring or stabilizing the nicotinic acetylcholine receptor at synaptic sites. It may link the receptor to the underlying postsynaptic cytoskeleton, possibly by direct association with actin or spectrin. Two splice variants have been identified for this gene.

== Role in health and disease ==
In the neuromuscular junction there is a vital pathway that maintains synaptic structure and results in the aggregation and localization of the acetylcholine receptor (AChR) on the postsynaptic folds. This pathway consists of agrin, muscle-specific tyrosine kinase (MuSK protein), AChRs and the AChR-clustering protein rapsyn, encoded by RAPSN. Genetic mutations of the proteins in the neuromuscular junction are associated with Congenital myasthenic syndrome (CMS). Postsynaptic defects are the most frequent cause of CMS and often result in abnormalities in the acetylcholine receptor. The vast majority of mutations causing CMS are found in the AChR subunits and rapsyn genes.

The rapsyn protein interacts directly with the AChRs and plays a vital role in agrin-induced clustering of the AChR. Without rapsyn, functional synapses cannot be created as the folds do not form properly. Patients with CMS-related mutations of the rapsyn protein typically are either homozygous for N88K or heterozygous for N88K and a second mutation. The major effect of the mutation N88K in rapsyn is to reduce the stability of AChR clusters. The second mutation can be a determining factor in the severity of the disease.

Studies have shown that most patients with CMS that have rapsyn mutations carry the common mutation N88K on at least one allele. However, research has revealed that there is a small population of patients who do not carry the N88K mutation on either of their alleles, but instead have different mutations of the RAPSN gene on both of their alleles. Two novel missense mutations that have been found are R164C and L283P and the result is a decrease in co-clustering of AChR with raspyn. A third mutation is the intronic base alteration IVS1-15C>A and it causes abnormal splicing of RAPSN RNA. These results show that diagnostic screening for CMS mutations of the RAPSN gene cannot be based exclusively on the detection of N88K mutations Interestingly, patients who bear the burden of CMS due to these rapsyn mutations often demonstrate a remarkable response to anticholinesterase drugs like pyridostigmine. Moreover, the supplemental inclusion of 3,4 DAP, ephedrine, or albuterol often yields significant clinical improvement.

== Interactions ==
RAPSN has been shown to interact with KHDRBS1.
