= MuSK protein =

Enzyme found in humans

MUSK
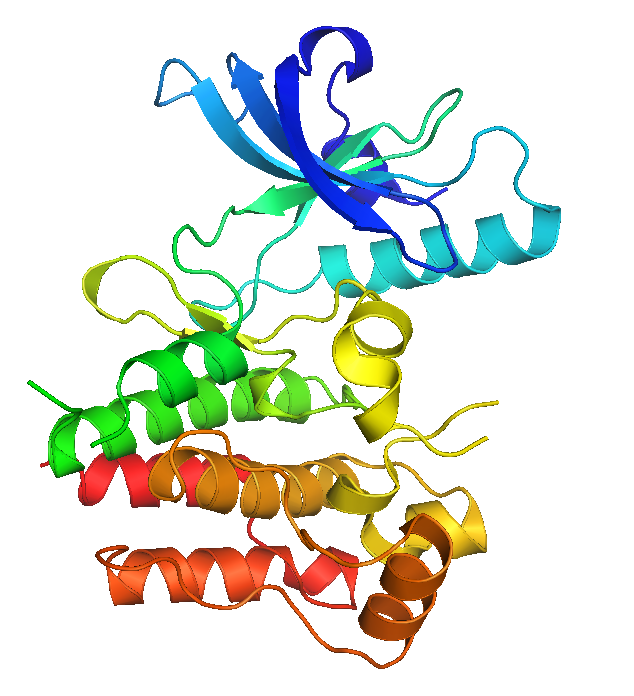

Identifiers
- Aliases: MUSK, CMS9, FADS, muscle associated receptor tyrosine kinase, MuSK protein, FADS1
- External IDs: OMIM: 601296; MGI: 103581; GeneCards: MUSK
Available structures
PDB	Ortholog search: PDBe RCSB
PDB	List of PDB id codes 3ML4
Enzyme activity
EC #	BRENDA	ExPASy	KEGG	MetaCyc
2.7.10.1	↗	↗	↗	↗

Gene location (Human)
Chr.	Chromosome 9 (human)
Band	9q31.3	Start	110,668,779 bp
Band	9q31.3	End	110,806,558 bp

Gene location (Mouse)
Chr.	Chromosome 4 (mouse)
Band	4 B3|4 31.87 cM	Start	58,285,960 bp
Band	4 B3|4 31.87 cM	End	58,374,303 bp
RNA expression pattern
Bgee	Human / Mouse (ortholog); Top expressed in: testicle; gastric mucosa; sural nerve; Achilles tendon; epithelium of colon; right lung; gastrocnemius muscle; corpus callosum; rectum; appendix / Top expressed in: secondary oocyte; zygote; Decidua capsularis; muscle of thigh; primary oocyte; tongue muscle; temporal muscle; Bowman's capsule; muscle of arm; triceps brachii muscle; More reference expression data
BioGPS	n/a
Gene ontology
Molecular function	transferase activity; nucleotide binding; protein kinase activity; metal ion binding; kinase activity; protein binding; transmembrane receptor protein tyrosine kinase activity; protein tyrosine kinase activity; ATP binding; receptor tyrosine kinase; transmembrane signaling receptor activity; Wnt-protein binding
Cellular component	integral component of membrane; postsynaptic membrane; membrane; neuromuscular junction; receptor complex; plasma membrane; synapse; integral component of plasma membrane; cell junction; cytoplasm
Biological process	cell differentiation; positive regulation of protein phosphorylation; phosphorylation; transmembrane receptor protein tyrosine kinase signaling pathway; positive regulation of protein geranylgeranylation; memory; multicellular organism development; protein phosphorylation; positive regulation of gene expression; neuromuscular junction development; skeletal muscle acetylcholine-gated channel clustering; regulation of synaptic assembly at neuromuscular junction; protein autophosphorylation; peptidyl-tyrosine phosphorylation; negative regulation of signal transduction; negative regulation of apoptotic process; positive regulation of ERK1 and ERK2 cascade; anatomical structure development
Sources:Amigo / QuickGO
Orthologs
Databases	NCBI: entry; OMA: entry
Species	Human	Mouse
Entrez	4593	18198
Ensembl	ENSG00000030304	ENSMUSG00000057280
UniProt	O15146	Q61006
RefSeq (mRNA)	NM_001166280; NM_001166281; NM_005592; NM_001369398	NM_001037127; NM_001037128; NM_001037129; NM_001037130; NM_001165996 NM_010944
RefSeq (protein)	NP_001159752; NP_001159753; NP_005583; NP_001356327	NP_001032204; NP_001032205; NP_001032206; NP_001032207; NP_001159468 NP_035074
Location (UCSC)	Chr 9: 110.67 – 110.81 Mb	Chr 4: 58.29 – 58.37 Mb
PubMed search
- Wikidata
View/Edit Human	View/Edit Mouse

MuSK (for Muscle-Specific Kinase) is an enzyme that in humans is encoded by the gene MUSK. This enzyme is a receptor tyrosine kinase required for the formation and maintenance of the neuromuscular junction. It is activated by a nerve-derived proteoglycan called agrin, which is similarly also required for neuromuscular junction formation.

== MuSK signaling ==
Upon activation by its ligand agrin, MuSK signals via the proteins called casein kinase 2 (CK2), Dok-7 and rapsyn, to induce "clustering" of acetylcholine receptors (AChR). Both CK2 and Dok-7 are required for MuSK-induced formation of the neuromuscular junction, since mice lacking Dok-7 failed to form AChR clusters or neuromuscular synapses, and since downregulation of CK2 also impedes recruitment of AChR to the primary MuSK scaffold. In addition to the proteins mentioned, other proteins are then gathered, to form the endplate to the neuromuscular junction. The nerve terminates onto the endplate, forming the neuromuscular junction - a structure required to transmit nerve impulses to the muscle, and thus initiating muscle contraction.

== Role in disease ==
Antibodies directed against this protein (Anti-MuSK autoantibodies) are found in some people with myasthenia gravis not demonstrating antibodies to the acetylcholine receptor. The disease still causes loss of acetylcholine receptor activity, but the symptoms affected people experience may differ from those of people with other causes of myasthenia gravis. Treatment of this form of myasthenia gravis relies on corticosteroids, as acetylcholinesterase inhibitors are generally ineffective.
