= BIA 10-2474 =

Chemical compound

Clinical data
- Other names: BIA-102474; BIA102474
- Routes of administration: Oral
- Drug class: Fatty acid amide hydrolase (FAAH) inhibitor
- ATC code: None

Legal status
- Legal status: US: Investigational New Drug

Identifiers
- IUPAC name: 3-(1-(cyclohexyl(methyl)carbamoyl)-1H-imidazol-4-yl)pyridine 1-oxide
- CAS Number: 1233855-46-3
- PubChem CID: 46831476
- IUPHAR/BPS: 9001
- ChemSpider: 41628677
- UNII: 5AP1ZW859M
- CompTox Dashboard (EPA): DTXSID901009325

Chemical and physical data
- Formula: C_{16}H_{20}N_{4}O_{2}
- Molar mass: 300.362 g·mol^{−1}
- 3D model (JSmol): Interactive image
- SMILES: CN(C(=O)n1cnc(-c2ccc[n+]([O-])c2)c1)C1CCCCC1
- InChI: InChI=1S/C16H20N4O2/c1-18(14-7-3-2-4-8-14)16(21)19-11-15(17-12-19)13-6-5-9-20(22)10-13/h5-6,9-12,14H,2-4,7-8H2,1H3; Key:DOWVMJFBDGWVML-UHFFFAOYSA-N

BIA 10-2474 is an experimental fatty-acid amide hydrolase (FAAH) inhibitor developed by the Portuguese pharmaceutical company Bial-Portela & Ca. SA. It interacts with the human endocannabinoid system. The drug was in development for the treatment of a range of different medical conditions from anxiety disorder to Parkinson's disease, also for the treatment of chronic pain of multiple sclerosis, cancer, hypertension, or the treatment of obesity. A clinical trial with this drug was underway in Rennes, France, in January 2016, in which serious adverse events occurred affecting five participants, including the death of one man. The underlying mechanism that caused the acute neurotoxicity of this molecule remains unknown.

== Structure and action ==
The chemical name of BIA-10-2474 is 3-(1-(cyclohexyl(methyl)carbamoyl)-1H-imidazol-4-yl)pyridine 1-oxide. BIA-10-2474 is a long-acting inhibitor of fatty acid amide hydrolase (FAAH) that increases levels of the neurotransmitter anandamide in the central nervous system and in peripheral tissues (that is, the rest of the body other than the brain and spinal cord).

In normal tissues, the enzyme FAAH degrades anandamide and other endocannabinoid neurotransmitters, which relieve pain and can affect eating and sleep patterns. FAAH inhibitors have been proposed for a range of nervous system disorders including anxiety disorders, alcoholism, pain and nausea.

The Portuguese pharmaceutical company Bial holds several patents on FAAH enzyme inhibitors. The structure and synthesis of BIA 10-2474 is disclosed in a Bial patent as 'compound 362', part of a Bial patent family dating from December 2008.

The patent discloses limited details about BIA 10–2474, mainly the screening assay results for each of the several hundred candidate compounds to evaluate the effect on FAAH activity. For compound 362 (that is, BIA 10–2474), an in vitro assay in rat brain showed only modest FAAH inhibition, however, mice given compound 362 at 3 mg/kg orally had less than 2% the normal level of FAAH activity in both brain and liver tissues after 8 hours. Inhibition of other enzymes affected by cannabinoids (monoacylglycerol lipase and liver carboxylesterase) was performed as a screen for biological selectivity for a small number of compounds, but compound 362 was not included. These results appear to be high-throughput screening data only, and no more definitive data are included (such as inhibitory concentration (IC50) or inhibition constant (Ki) values that characterise the potency of the molecule's inhibition of, or binding with, the target).

The Agence Nationale de Sécurité du Médicament et des Produits de Santé (ANSM) reported that the compound has a rat IC50 of 1.1-1.7 micromolar, and that this is 200 times the concentration required for inhibition with a different FAAH inhibitor developed by Pfizer (that is, much weaker). As such, the ANSM described the molecule as "a compound with a relatively poor specificity for the endocannabinoid FAAH." In the same report, the ANSM also noted that the inhibitor is irreversible, not reversible as claimed by the manufacturer Bial.

Publication of the chemical structure created considerable interest among chemists, with some sharing online their assessment of likely binding interactions between BIA 10-2474 and in vivo targets. At least one analysis using standard software modelling packages found that although FAAH emerged as the primary target for BIA 10–2474, a number of other proteins rated highly as well. These other targets included histone deacetylases, macrophage-stimulating protein receptor and hormone-sensitive lipase.

Although the exact mechanism of action leading to BIA 10-2474 toxicity remains unknown, the final report by the ANSM Committee concluded it was likely one of two possible mechanisms: "inhibition of other serine hydrolases, or harmful effects from the imidazole-pyridine leaving group." The report also theorised that this leaving group "may produce an isocyanate to which many brain proteins are likely to bind." A 2017 research article suggested the off-target activity of BIA 10-2474 may affect lipid metabolism in neurones.

== Preclinical studies ==
According to a company statement, a project to develop FAAH inhibitors was initiated by Bial in 2005, and studies with this compound began in 2009 with pre-clinical in vitro and in vivo pharmacological and toxicological evaluation. The French medicines regulator (ANSM) released a version of the clinical trial protocol, after the newspaper Le Figaro leaked a (more recent) version. The protocol presents a summary of what appears to be a full package of pharmacodynamic, pharmacokinetic and toxicological studies that might be expected to support a first-in-man study. The manufacturer Bial refused the regulator's request to release the Investigator's brochure and the product dossier (the Investigational Medicinal Product Dossier; IMPD), citing French law on trade secrets.

An expert committee, established by the French medicines regulator after the trial, requested clarification from Bial of a range of preclinical issues.

=== Pharmacodynamics and pharmacokinetics ===
In terms of animal pharmacodynamics, the trial protocol reports that the biological activity of BIA 10-2474 was tested in models of predictive efficacy in treating pain. "BIA 10-2474 produced analgesic/anti-inflammatory activity in the mouse Formalin-Paw and Tail-Flick tests in a time-and dose-dependent manner. BIA 10-2474 also markedly potentiated the antinociceptive effects of exogenous anandamide in the mouse Formalin-Paw and Tail-Flick tests". In other words, BIA 10-2474 worked as a pain-killer in mice using two different tests (the "analgesic/anti-inflammatory" effect); and, in mice that had been given a dose of the neurotransmitter anandamide, BIA 10-2474 also improved its effects in numbing pain ("antinociceptive" effect). The expert committee of the ANSM took the view that this was insufficient basis for commencing human trials, and that further evidence of BIA 10-2474 as an analgesic was warranted. The committee's final report noted that in fact the original formalin paw study report presented additional data for the gabapentin comparator which was omitted in the Investigators Brochure. The final ANSM report stated that "doses used in these tests differ greatly (from 0.3 to 10 mg/Kg), without it being possible to trace a dose-effect curve or to estimate an effective dose 50 (which is a surprising shortcoming)".

In terms of animal pharmacokinetics, in rats and dogs given a radio-labelled dose of BIA 10–2474, the drug was detectable in the blood for up to a day afterwards (oral or i.v.). Oral bioavailability was not reported. Terminal half-life (persistence in the blood) of the BIA 10–2474 in rats was 45 hours (oral) or 4 hours (i.v.) and in dogs it was 104 hours (oral) or 52 hours (i.v.). The authors made no prediction of a likely half-life in humans. Around two-thirds of the total dose was eliminated in the urine, about one-fifth in the faeces and the remainder was heavily metabolized in all species studied (rat, mouse, dog, monkey). Metabolism of BIA 10-2474 was essentially complete by 72 hours. Main metabolites were not described. The studies used total detectable radioactivity to calculate half-life and did not assess what proportion of this was due to metabolites.

The preliminary report by the French Inspector General for Social Affairs (IGAS), for the French Ministry of Health, remarked on the difference between the rat oral vs. I.V. half life, and, that in light of the adverse events seen in humans on repeated dosing, this may indicate "a mechanism of accumulation". Separately, accumulation of BIA 10-2474 given orally in humans was supported by pharmacokinetic data from the trial itself, reviewed by the ANSM expert committee. The molecule showed non-linear pharmacokinetics at doses between 40 and 100 mg, suggesting elimination pathways had become saturated, leading to accumulation.

The final report by the ANSM Committee noted the drug had a very steep dose-effect curve in humans "going from absence of to almost complete inhibition" over a narrow concentration range. The report also found, based on clinical data from the Rennes trial, that complete inhibition by BIA 10-2474 was very long-acting, and persisted well beyond the point where it was no longer detectable in blood of the trial subjects.

=== Safety pharmacology and toxicology ===
The protocol presents a summary of safety pharmacology studies in two species (rat, dog) and repeated dose toxicity studies in four species (13-week sub-chronic studies in mouse, dog and monkey; a 26-week chronic study in the rat). Of note, few adverse events were observed in any of the studies, with the oral No Observed Adverse Effect Level (NOAEL) varying between 10 mg/kg/day in rats to 75 mg/kg/day in monkeys. The authors suggest that these were the maximum doses tested in these studies, though it is not clear. The authors also report no effects of significance in the animal models used for the CNS safety pharmacology studies, which studied a dose of up to 300 mg/kg/day. The protocol nominates a human NOAEL of 100 mg as a human equivalent dose to the 26-week rat NOAEL, though with no description how this was calculated. The summary presented however includes no assessment of the relevance of the animal species selected for study (that is, in terms of physiological and genetic similarities with humans and the mechanism of action of the study drug). Early reports that the molecule had been studied in chimpanzees turned out to be incorrect.

At a hearing convened by the ANSM in March 2016, Bial clarified that the apparently extensive animal toxicology studies (and number of species) was due to a delay in commencement of clinical development, thus some studies had already been completed that would not have been required for a Phase I study. The ANSM Committee found no evidence that the studies had been performed because the company had doubts as to the tolerance of the molecule.

Notably absent from the protocol were calculations of receptor occupancy; predictions of in vivo ligand binding saturation levels; measures of target affinity or assessment of non-target binding interactions as suggested by the European guidance for Phase I studies (depending on whether BIA 10-2474 could be considered to require 'special consideration' as outlined in the guideline). On these issues, the French regulator's expert committee pointed out, based on the company's IC50 data, that complete FAAH inhibition should have been achieved with a dose of 1.25 mg in humans. In fact, the trial tested doses up to 80 times more (100 mg BIA 10–2474) than should have been required. The ANSM committee also requested data on non-target enzyme affinity from the manufacturer Bial.

Although the protocol summary reports no animal deaths during the studies, the ANSM expert committee reported that in fact several monkeys died or had to be euthanised during the dose escalation studies and that an explanation from Bial was pending. Also, two animals had to be euthanised in the 13-week dog study due to lung lesions - both from the top dose group. None of these animal deaths were described in the trial protocol.

It is not clear whether Bial disclosed these adverse animal findings either to Biotrial or to the ANSM in their application for clinical trial authorisation.

The findings presented in the trial protocol provide no explanation for the type and severity of events that would be later observed in Rennes. The preliminary report from the IGAS investigation, released by the French Minister for Health in February 2016, found there was no legal requirement in France for the trial sponsor to disclose all pre-clinical data to the ANSM. The Minister described this as an opportunity for improvement. Nevertheless, the IGAS report commented that the investigation thus far had not found any reason to fault the ANSM's authorisation of the trial based on the preclinical data.

The final report by the ANSM Committee concluded regarding the preclinical studies that "no aspects of the data that the TSSC has studied constituted a signal likely to contraindicate administration in humans." The report went on however to criticise Bial's Investigator's Brochure: "the brochure contains many mistakes, inaccuracies, figure inversions or incorrect translation of source documents, making understanding difficult in several aspects. This is highly surprising given the regulatory importance of this document."

== Phase I clinical trial ==
=== Overview ===
In 2015 Biotrial, a contract research organization, initiated a first-in-human trial of BIA 10–2474 in healthy volunteers, with secondary endpoints to investigate neuropathic pain. The study was approved by the French regulatory authority, the ANSM, on 26 June 2015, and by the Brest regional ethics committee on 3 July 2015. The trial protocol was leaked by Le Figaro before a different version was released by ANSM. The manufacturer Bial refused the regulator's request to release the Investigator's brochure and the product dossier (Investigational Medicinal Product Dossier), citing French law on trade secrets.

=== Trial details ===
The study was entitled "A double-blind, randomised, placebo-controlled, combined single and multiple ascending dose study including food interaction, to investigate the safety, tolerability, pharmacokinetic and pharmacodynamic profile of BIA 10-2474, in healthy volunteers". The trial commenced on 9 July 2015 at a single centre in the city of Rennes, and commenced recruitment of 128 healthy volunteers, both men and women aged 18 to 55. Participants of the study were to receive €1,900 and, in turn, asked to stay at Biotrial's facility for two weeks during which time they would take the drug for ten days and undergo tests. The study drug was presented as capsules in three different strengths (0.25, 2.5 and 10 mg). The protocol describes four distinct parts to the study:

- a single dose ascending part
- a cross-over part to evaluate fed vs. fasting conditions (could be either single or multiple dose)
- a multiple dose ascending part
- a pharmacodynamics part to evaluate the effect of BIA 10-2474 vs placebo with different challenge agents

The protocol specifies the first three parts would be double-blind but the pharmacodynamics part would be open label. According to the protocol, dose levels and numbers of groups could be increased, or were not yet defined, and would depend on what was observed with initial dosing, (an approach known as adaptive trial design). Thus many details of the key multi-dose part are not included in the trial protocol. The absence of these details was criticised by scientists and in the media, before the ANSM published further details of the dosing. The Royal Statistical Society was particularly critical, stating that it had "clear statistical reservations about the trial's study design", and that the protocol lacked features such as a risk assessment, recommended in the wake of the TGN1412 incident to prevent severe adverse events occurring in these circumstances.

=== Starting dose and subsequent doses ===
For the single dose part of the study, the protocol describes eight groups of eight volunteers (3:1 randomised) who were to receive single doses of BIA 10–2474 at 0.25, 1.25, 2.5, 5.0, 10, 20, 40 and 100 mg, with the possibility of additional groups to be added if no maximum tolerated dose was reached. In describing the rationale for the starting dose, the authors of the protocol conclude that:

No target organ was identified during toxicology studies and few adverse clinical findings were observed at the highest dose tested. For the single ascending dose part [of the clinical trial], a starting dose of 0.25 mg was judged to be safe for a first-in-human administration.

The protocol provides for the first two subjects of the first single dose cohort to receive the first dose as a sentinel dose, that is, either 0.25 mg BIA 10-2474 or a placebo on the first day, then wait for 24h before treating the other 5:1 subjects. In the event no safety concerns had emerged in the foregoing, all other single- and multi-dose groups were to be dosed with a 10-minute interval between recipients.

For the multiple ascending dose part of the study, the protocol planned four groups of eight volunteers (3:1 randomised) who were to receive a single dose orally, once daily for 10 days at different dose levels. However, the protocol defines no doses for these groups, stating that this will be based on the outcome of the single dose portion of the trial. Further dose groups up to a maximum of eight groups could be added depending on whether adverse events were observed. The authors note that nonetheless, the starting dose will not exceed 33% of the maximum tolerated dose (MTD) identified in the single dose groups (or 33% of the maximum administered dose if the MTD is not reached).

Further details of the study as it was actually conducted have been published by the French agency (ANSM). The dose groups for the single dose part were as described in the protocol, with no additional groups undertaken. In the crossover part, a single 40 mg dose was given to a group of 12 subjects. In the multiple dose ascending part, the doses were 2.5, 5.0, 10, 20 and 50 mg BIA 10–2474, each to be given once per day for 10 days to groups of 8 volunteers (3:1 randomised). The severe adverse events were observed in the 50 mg dose group.

The ANSM expert committee reported that complete FAAH inhibition should have been achieved by a dose of 1.25 mg remarking that:

It appears unjustified to plan to test a dose (100 mg) 80 times higher than that presumed to induce complete and prolonged FAAH inhibition.

Further, the ANSM committee remarked that the gap between the 20 mg and 50 mg dose cohorts, in effect, skipped a dose based on extrapolation from the single dose part of the study, and that the progression to 50 mg was too large a jump. On reviewing the subject data from the trial itself, the committee noted that BIA 10-2474 showed non-linear pharmacokinetics at doses between 40 and 100 mg (that is, the molecule appeared to be accumulating at higher doses) and that most likely the elimination mechanism had become saturated. Thus dosing at 50 mg daily was - each day - 40 times more than required to achieve complete inhibition, and in practice this dose level resulted in accumulation.

=== Trial status at the time of serious adverse events ===
According to Bial and the Rennes University Hospital, by the time the serious adverse reactions emerged, 116 subjects had been recruited and 84 other volunteers had received the drug during the trial, with no serious adverse events being reported. The single dose part (up to 100 mg BIA 10–2474), the fed vs. fasting part, and the first four dose groups of the multi-dose part of the study had each been completed in 2015. Notably, the administration of 20 mg BIA 10-2474 once daily for 10 consecutive days elicited no serious adverse events in the six volunteers who received it.

Dosing of eight volunteers in the highest multi-dose group in the BIA 10-2474 trial commenced on 6 January 2016. Six of the participants received 50 mg per day of the drug while two received placebo. The first subject became ill on the evening of the 5th day of dosing (10 January). On the following day, the other subjects received a 6th dose at 8:00am before the trial was suspended later that day (11 January).

== Death and serious adverse events ==
The fifth dose level (50 mg per day for 10 days) of the multi-dose part of study had been underway for five days when the first volunteer became ill and was hospitalized at the Rennes University Hospital on the evening of 10 January 2016 with symptoms similar to a stroke. The following day, the man lapsed into a coma and was shortly thereafter declared brain dead. According to the hospital, the man died at midday on 17 January 2016. Four of the other five men in the same dosage group were also hospitalized between 10 and 13 January suffering injuries similar to the man who died, including deep haemorrhagic and necrotic lesions seen on brain MRI. All the MRI findings, though widely varying in severity, were of the same form and seen in the hippocampus and pons of the affected individuals. Biotrial stopped the study on 11 January and both the ANSM and regional ethics committee were notified on 14 January.

The men who were hospitalised were all from the group which received the highest dose of the multiple ascending part of the trial. A neurologist at the University of Rennes Hospital Center, Professor Pierre-Gilles Edan, stated in a press conference with the French Minister for Health, that 3 of the 4 men who were displaying neurological symptoms "already have a severe enough clinical picture to fear that even in the best situation there will be an irreversible handicap" and were being given corticosteroids to control the inflammation. The sixth man from the group was not showing adverse effects but was hospitalized on 15 January 2016 for observation. Other study volunteers who had received doses with no ill effects were asked to return for further testing.

The man who died was later named by local news media as Guillaume Molinet, 49, an artist and father of four from Guilliers, a town in the Breton department of Morbihan. According to the man's brother Laurent Molinet, Guillaume was recruited as a stand-by and went to Rennes not expecting to be dosed, only being given BIA 10-2474 because another volunteer dropped out. Molinet's family said they were originally told he had had a stroke that was unrelated to the clinical trial, though this quickly turned out not to be the case. Molinet's family objected that key information was hidden by Bial/Biotrial and is reported to have launched a manslaughter lawsuit.

== Reaction and investigations ==
The events in Rennes were made public on 15 January 2016 and were reported widely in the media in France, internationally in mainstream news and scientific media. All these reports drew comparisons between this incident and the TGN1412 trial at Northwick Park, London in which six volunteers developed life-threatening drug reactions during a Phase I study in 2006.

The journal Nature quoted Bial spokeswoman Susana Vasconcelos as saying the trial had been conducted "in accordance with all the good international practices guidelines, with the completion of tests and preclinical trials" and that "the company is committed to determine thoroughly and exhaustively the causes which are at the origin of this situation". Bial also denounced the unauthorised release of the trial protocol and was critical of the wide-ranging speculation by scientists and the media about the possible cause of the incident. In July 2016, Bial's Executive Director António Portela confirmed his company's decision to permanently abandon development of the molecule.

The journal also sought comment from Jean-Marc Gandon, the president and chief executive of the CRO Biotrial, who said "he cannot immediately respond to queries from Nature, that he is focused on trying to save the patients and that the company will respond later". Biotrial stated its position that "The trial was conducted in full compliance with the international regulations and Biotrial's procedures, in particular the emergency procedures".

As of March 2016 it remained unclear whether Bial disclosed the adverse animal findings to Biotrial, including the deaths of monkeys and dogs in several studies. François Peaucelle, the director general of Biotrial, is reported to have told Le Figaro. "We received a 15-page summary of the tests that was based on data that would have filled a lorry. From that data, there was nothing worrying in view of the dosage we were administering to humans."

=== French authorities ===
The Agence Nationale de Sécurité du Médicament (ANSM) announced an investigation, and that an inspection of the trial site was already underway. and formation of a specialist committee of pharmacologists, toxicologists and neurologists to review all existing data on FAAH inhibitor drugs. The French health minister Marisol Touraine, who visited the trial site in Rennes and spoke with the victims' families, called the events "an accident of exceptional gravity" and promised to investigate the matter via the Inspector General for Social Affairs (IGAS), with a final report due end of March. A judicial investigation was also initiated after the Office of the Chief Prosecutor for Paris announced it would look into potential charges of involuntary injury through its public health enforcement section, seeking assistance from the Gendarmerie in Rennes and the Ministry of Justice's Office for the Environment and Public Health.

The ONIAM (Office National d'Indemnisation des Accidents Médicaux), responsible for medical injury compensation, stated only 10 accidents had occurred during clinical trials over the past 15 years per its records, and that those cases had "consequences infinitely less serious" than the incident in Rennes.

Initial reports from the authorities suggested that the causes of the brain injuries was likely to be due to the mechanism of BIA 10-2474 and the doses employed in the trial. ANSM Director General Dominique Martin said "It is clearly the molecule that is the cause", following the publication of the ANSM expert committee's initial findings on 7 March 2016.

In May 2016, the French Health Minister announced several new measures for clinical trials in France, including the establishment of an expert group within the ANSM for review of first in human and early phase studies.

==== Inspection générale des affaires sociales reports ====
The Inspection générale des affaires sociales (IGAS) released a preliminary report on 5 February 2016. The French Minister of Health indicated that the cause of the death of one of the subjects had not been identified; it claimed Biotrial failed three major issues: The study should have been stopped when the first subject was hospitalized so the drug would not have been given to five others; the incident should have been reported immediately, namely January 10, not four days later; all other subjects should have been notified right away asking them if they would like to continue in the study. The Health Minister noted further that a number of the trial protocol provisions had been too vague and not precise enough; that the eligibility criteria should have been more explicit regarding substance use habits of the volunteers and that there was no legal requirement for the sponsor to disclose all pre-clinical data to the ANSM. The Minister announced that all clinical trials in France in the event of a serious, unexpected adverse event such as this would be explicitly required to re-consent the remaining trial participants. The Comité de Protection des Personnes (CPP) in Brest, a research ethics committee, has asked Bial for the exclusion criteria on the consuming cannabis and other psychoactive substances.

Biotrial published a detailed response on its website, expressing its disappointment to learn of the report via the media and not prior to its publication from the Health Ministry. It stated the trial was halted as soon as it became apparent that the first volunteer had a serious adverse event, and that the man's initial symptoms on 10 January had been mild enough that he was expected to return to the trial facility on 11 January which is why it did not re-consent all volunteers. CHU informed Biotrial at 10:00 am on 11 January that the man had likely had a stroke, at which point the trial was halted, though it was not known whether the stroke had anything to do with the study drug. This was after further doses had been given to the other volunteers (at 8:00 am that morning). Biotrial's statement offered no comment on the time taken between the trial halt at 10:00 am on the 11th and the notification of the authorities three days later on the 14th.

==== ANSM Comité Scientifique Spécialisé Temporaire ====
The final report from the ANSM Committee appointed to investigate the matter concluded in April 2016 that: [T]he most likely hypothesis to date is that of toxicity specific to the molecule via its binding to other brain cell structures, facilitated by (1) its low specificity for its target enzyme; (2) use of multiple doses a lot higher than those leading (at least in humans) to complete and lasting FAAH inhibition, and; (3) its probable gradual accumulation in the brain, undoubtedly related to the specific pharmacokinetic features of BIA 10-2474.

The committee also criticised the clinical study design which "probably significantly contributed to the accident", noting that administration of the top multi-dose groups did not and could not take into account emerging pharmacokinetic data from latest dose groups and offered no chance to adjust the dose as adverse events emerged. The choice of dose escalation levels (20 to 50 to 100 mg) was based on pharmacokinetic data from the 10 mg group and data from the 50 mg dose group (that would have clearly shown non-proportional dose kinetics) were not yet available when administration to the 100 mg multi-dose group commenced.

The committee made six recommendations, which it invited European and International regulators to consider (reproduced here in brief):

- Justification and demonstration of pharmacological activity predictive of efficacy in humans cannot be considered to be secondary. [P]harmacology studies [should be sufficient] to establish a dose-effect curve (where appropriate) [and] to be reasonably predictive of real-life, future therapeutic efficacy.
- A neuropsychological assessment with clinical interview and cognitive tests should be a compulsory part of assessment during volunteer screening, inclusion and clinical monitoring in a Phase 1 trial for drugs with "central nervous system" tropism.
- All first-in-human and Phase 1 protocols should, unless unnecessary, provide for the doses to be tested in volunteers to be adjusted according to the data collected in volunteers already having been exposed during the trial.
- During first-in-human and Phase 1 trials, volunteer safety should take precedence over any practical, economic or regulatory considerations.
- Dose escalation strategies in first-in-human and Phase 1 trials should take account of considerations based on common clinical and pharmacological sense.
- The committee would like to see a debate opened at European and international level, on access to data from ongoing or previous first-in-human and Phase 1 trials.

=== Agencies outside France ===
A European Medicines Agency (EMA) spokesperson said in January 2016 that "EU authorities will look carefully at the findings to determine if further measures are needed to protect health of clinical trial participants. Until EU authorities have the full picture, it is not possible to say whether any revisions to EU guidelines are required". Later, in July 2016, the agency proposed to revise its key first-in-human clinical trial guideline, the last significant revision having been published in response to the 2006 TGN1412 clinical trial that had had similarly dire effects in its trial volunteers. The EMA stated the proposal aimed to address risks posed by complex trials, such as the one undertaken in Rennes, having 'several steps of clinical development within a single clinical trial protocol'.

The European Investment Bank, which provided 110 million euros in funding for Bial's FAAH inhibitor programme stated it had been in contact with the company about the incident, but that "it would be premature to consider recall of the EIB loan at this stage".

The US Food and Drug Administration issued a statement that it was in contact with its counterparts the ANSM as well as the EMA and announced investigations into FAAH inhibitors as a drug class."FDA is in the process of collecting and reviewing safety information pertinent to FAAH inhibitors under investigation in the US. FDA will work with sponsors to ensure the safety of participants in clinical studies and take regulatory action as appropriate." Later, in August 2016, the Agency issued a further statement: "The Agency has found, based on the available information, that BIA 10-2474 exhibits a unique toxicity that does not extend to other drugs in the class, called fatty acid amide hydrolase (FAAH) inhibitors."

The German drug regulator, the Bundesinstitut für Arzneimittel und Medizinprodukte (BfArM) issued a statement 19 January that no clinical trials with FAAH inhibitors were underway in Germany, but that it had authorised seven such trials previously, which were completed without serious incidents.

== Outcome for trial participants ==
The Rennes University Hospital provided updates on the remaining volunteers in the study and the treating specialists later published a medical report describing the sickened volunteers in November 2016 in The New England Journal of Medicine. The published medical report described the adverse events as "An acute and rapidly progressive neurologic syndrome [of which] the main clinical features were headache, a cerebellar syndrome, memory impairment, and altered consciousness". The authors were of the view that "the toxic effects we observed were related to drug accumulation. This hypothesis is supported by the nonlinear pharmacokinetics of BIA 10-2474 for doses higher than 40 to 100 mg" and as reported by the ANSM's expert committee. The authors were not however granted access to information from the post-mortem of the man who died.

Of the five survivors from the top dose group and the other trial participants:

- Two of the top dose group survivors with serious neurological injuries were discharged to care facilities closer to their homes on 18 January 2016, and a third on the 20th. As of 26 January 2016, one of these men was being treated as an outpatient; one had developed an intercurrent illness and had not yet been discharged, and a third had improved enough to go home. The last of the patients had improved enough to be discharged to home 21 January 2016. All five survivors were due to have a follow-up evaluation at the hospital in Rennes at the end of February 2016.
- The hospital contacted the other 84 volunteers who received BIA 10-2474 and found no clinical or radiological abnormalities on re-examination of 75 of the volunteers in January 2016. An ANSM investigation into these 84 volunteers looked for evidence of brain abnormalities on MRI and any report of neurological symptoms experienced during or after the trial. The ANSM report, published in November 2016, concluded that the findings reported in these individuals were consistent with the typical incidence in the wider population and were not similar in characteristics to those seen in the top dose group.
- The participant from the top dose group who was hospitalised for observation did not develop any symptoms, nor any findings by MRI, and returned home on 18 January 2016. The individual had remained asymptomatic as of November 2016.
- According to the published medical report, at least two of the top dose group survivors continued to suffer effects as of November 2016 - "residual memory impairment" in one case, and "a residual cerebellar syndrome" in another. In December 2016, a Bial representative at a British Pharmacological Society conference in London confirmed that the four symptomatic survivors who received the top dose were continuing to suffer neurological side-effects.

News reports from March 2016 described the condition of Stéphane Schubhan (42), a professional photographer from La Flèche, Sarthe and participant of the top dose cohort. Mr. Schubhan "sleeps badly, has nightmares, sees double at all times, walks with difficulty, and succumbs to dizziness and nausea if he stands more than 10 minutes at a time" and does not know if he will be able to work again. Mr. Schubhan said he had participated in a previous clinical trial, but in this case he was never informed about the animal deaths that were later revealed and would never have consented to take part had he known. Doctors have told Schubhan that they hope he will improve over the coming 6–12 months but that they do not know what the outcome will be. In 2023, Mr. Schubhan was convicted and sentenced to 30 years jail for the 2019 attempted murder of his partner and children's mother, whom he was planning to leave.

Under French Law, all clinical trial participants are protected by the 1988 Huriet Law on the protection of persons in clinical research. The BIA 10-2474 trial participants are therefore entitled to financial compensation as well as recourse to civil and criminal proceedings. The family of Guillaume Molinet commenced manslaughter proceedings in late January 2016.

== Implications for other FAAH inhibitors ==
Other pharmaceutical companies, including Merck, Pfizer, Johnson & Johnson, Sanofi, and Vernalis, have previously taken other FAAH inhibitors into clinical trials without experiencing such adverse events (e.g., respectively, MK-4409, PF-04457845, JNJ-42165279, SSR411298, and V158866. Related enzyme inhibitor compounds such as URB-597 and LY-2183240 have been sold illicitly as designer drugs.

Following the events in Rennes, Janssen announced that it was temporarily suspending dosing in two Phase II clinical trials with its own FAAH inhibitor, JNJ-42165279, headlining the decision as "precautionary measure follows safety issue with different drug in class". Janssen was emphatic that no serious adverse events had been reported in any of the clinical trials with JNJ-42165279 to date. Janssen did not state whether the suspension, though voluntary, was at the request of the FDA. The suspension was to remain in effect until more information is available about the BIA 10-2474 study.

Pfizer had previously been developing an FAAH inhibitor PF-04457845 for indications including osteoarthritis pain and trauma. A spokesperson commented after the events in Rennes that "we [Pfizer] did explore the potential of a FAAH-inhibitor for osteoarthritic pain in Phase 2 trials, however, no significant efficacy was observed. The FAAH-inhibitor was recently being evaluated in Post-Traumatic Stress Disorder but this trial was discontinued in 2015 for business reasons. We do not have any active trials in this area".

Sanofi also had been developing an FAAH inhibitor candidate SSR411298 for the treatment of depression. However, a spokesperson stated in January 2016 that "we have no projects in development that target this enzyme".

== See also ==
- 4-Nonylphenylboronic acid - FAAH inhibitor, preclinical stage
- Arachidonoyl serotonin - FAAH inhibitor, preclinical stage
- URB-597 - FAAH inhibitor, preclinical stage
- TGN1412 - A monoclonal antibody trialed in 2006 in London, with serious adverse events prompting change of EMA recommendations
- Fialuridine - A nucleoside analogue to treat Hepatitis B, fatality rate 5 out of 15 patients,
