= MK-4409 =

Chemical compound

Clinical data
- ATC code: None

Legal status
- Legal status: US: Investigational New Drug

Identifiers
- IUPAC name: 2-[5-[5-(5-Chloropyridin-2-yl)sulfanyl-2-(4-fluorophenyl)-1,3-oxazol-4-yl]pyridin-2-yl]propan-2-ol
- CAS Number: 1207745-58-1
- PubChem CID: 53341130
- ChemSpider: 25069631
- UNII: 77GX6MU9ZL
- ChEMBL: ChEMBL1812717
- CompTox Dashboard (EPA): DTXSID101045923

Chemical and physical data
- Formula: C_{22}H_{17}FN_{3}O_{2}S
- Molar mass: 406.46 g·mol^{−1}
- 3D model (JSmol): Interactive image
- SMILES: c3nc(C(O)(C)C)ccc3-c1nc(-c4ccc(F)cc4)oc1Sc(nc2)ccc2Cl
- InChI: InChI=1S/C22H17ClFN3O2S/c1-22(2,28)17-9-5-14(11-25-17)19-21(30-18-10-6-15(23)12-26-18)29-20(27-19)13-3-7-16(24)8-4-13/h3-12,28H,1-2H3; Key:DBZMCSVIITXLCC-UHFFFAOYSA-N

MK-4409 is an experimental drug which acts as a potent and selective inhibitor of the enzyme fatty acid amide hydrolase (FAAH), with an IC_{50} of 11 nM, and both analgesic and antiinflammatory effects in animal studies. It was studied for the treatment of neuropathic pain and progressed to early stage human clinical trials by 2009.

== See also ==
- LY-2183240
- URB-597
- PF-3845
- BIA 10-2474
