= JNJ-42165279 =

Chemical compound

Clinical data
- ATC code: None

Legal status
- Legal status: US: Investigational New Drug

Identifiers
- IUPAC name: N-(4-Chloropyridin-3-yl)-4-[(2,2-difluoro-1,3-benzodioxol-5-yl)methyl]piperazine-1-carboxamide
- CAS Number: 1346528-50-4
- PubChem CID: 54576693
- ChemSpider: 45743462
- UNII: AH2E5UQ11Y
- CompTox Dashboard (EPA): DTXSID501045937

Chemical and physical data
- Formula: C_{18}H_{17}ClF_{2}N_{4}O_{3}
- Molar mass: 410.81 g·mol^{−1}
- 3D model (JSmol): Interactive image
- SMILES: c3c1OC(F)(F)Oc1ccc3CN4CCN(CC4)C(=O)Nc2cnccc2Cl
- InChI: InChI=1S/C18H17ClF2N4O3/c19-13-3-4-22-10-14(13)23-17(26)25-7-5-24(6-8-25)11-12-1-2-15-16(9-12)28-18(20,21)27-15/h1-4,9-10H,5-8,11H2,(H,23,26); Key:YWGYNGCRVZLMCS-UHFFFAOYSA-N

JNJ-42165279 is a drug developed by Janssen Pharmaceutica which acts as a potent and selective inhibitor of the enzyme fatty-acid amide hydrolase (FAAH), with an IC_{50} of 70 nM. It is described as a covalently binding but slowly reversible selective inhibitor of FAAH. JNJ-42165279 is being developed for the treatment of anxiety disorders and major depressive disorder. Clinical development has progressed as far as Phase II human trials with two studies in patients with mood disorders registered in ClinicalTrials.gov.

In early 2016, a trial with a different FAAH inhibitor — Bial's BIA 10-2474 — resulted in a series of severe adverse events, including a death. In response, Janssen announced that it was temporarily suspending dosing in its two Phase II clinical trials with JNJ-42165279, describing the decision as "precautionary measure follows safety issue with different drug in class". Janssen was emphatic that no serious adverse events had been reported in any of the clinical trials with JNJ-42165279 to date. The suspension remained in effect until more information became available about the BIA 10-2474 study. As of 2018, the trials had resumed.

== See also ==
- List of investigational anxiolytics
- LY-2183240
- URB-597
- PF-3845
- BIA 10-2474
