= Marsili syndrome =

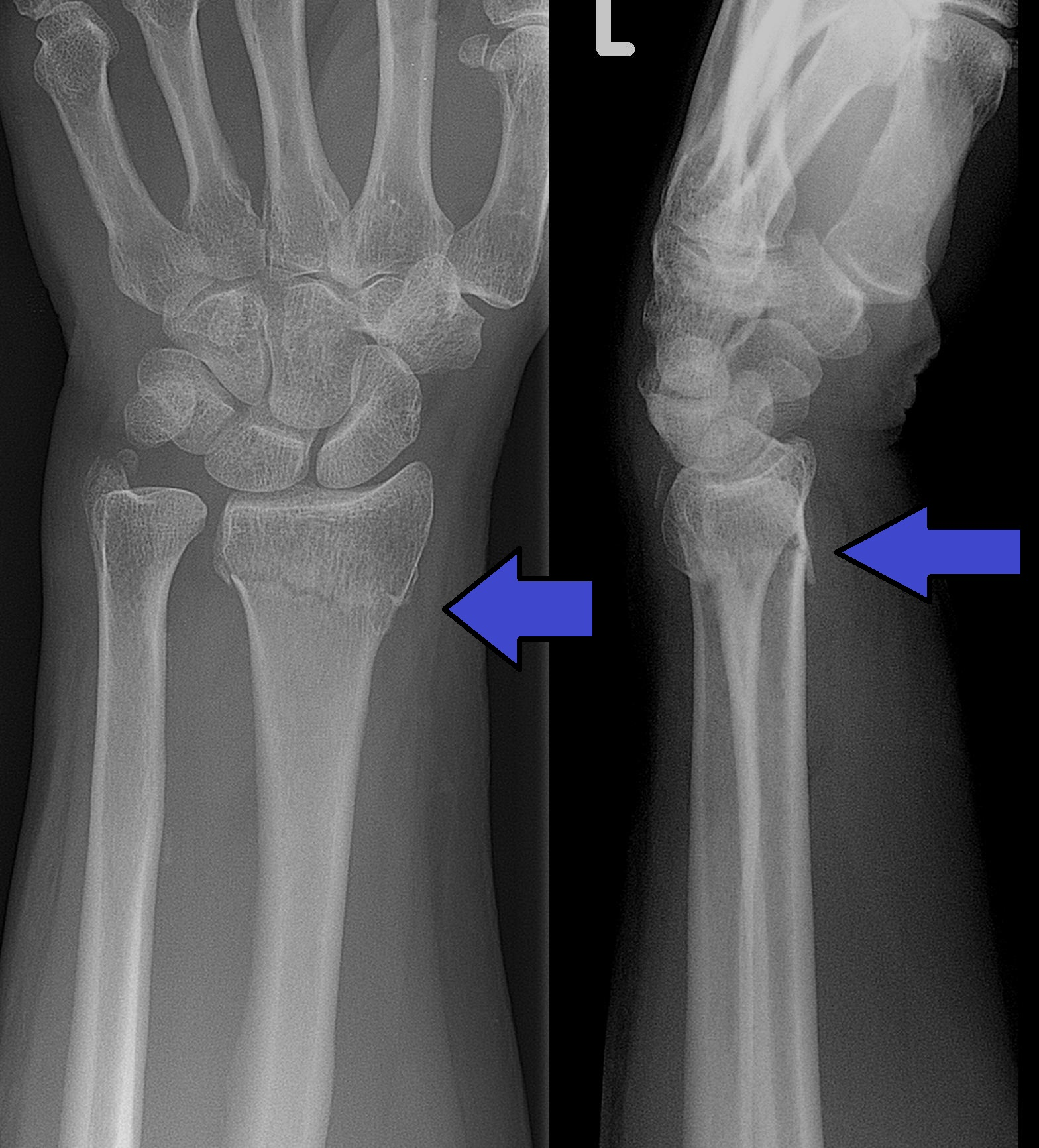
- Specialty: Medical genetics, Neurology
- Symptoms: Inability to feel pain from birth is the main characteristic
- Complications: Internal bleeding, Skin burn, Fractures, Death
- Usual onset: Birth
- Duration: Lifelong
- Causes: Genetic mutation
- Prevention: none
- Prognosis: Medium (with treatment and management), bad (without treatment and management)
- Frequency: extraordinarily rare, only 17 cases from 4 families around the world have been described in medical literature
- Deaths: -

Marsili syndrome is an extremely rare genetic disorder which is characterized by symptoms similar to those reported on individuals with congenital insensitivity to pain with anhidrosis. It can be fatal if it goes unnoticed/undiagnosed.

== Signs and symptoms ==
Individuals with this disorder usually have a congenital inability to sense pain, reduced ability to sense temperature, and hypohidrosis/anhidrosis which typically results in the body's impaired ability to regulate body temperature. Although these symptoms are consistent with CIPA, there are also symptoms which wouldn't be able to fulfill the criteria for CIPA, these include: the ability to have occasional headaches, the ability to feel light touch and the pain that comes with childbirth (women), and the absence of congenital anosmia, which is a condition that causes the inability to smell from birth, which would reasonably leave a normal, untouched sense of smell. Additional findings include corneal hyporeflexia.

== Complications ==
Injuries such as osseous fractures, skin burns, bruises and more serious ailments such as internal bleeding and appendicitis have a higher occurrence rate among people with the condition, since they don't have a concept of pain, they don't have a way of knowing if they have been injured or if they are suffering from pain in an area of their body that isn't the head or the stomach.

== Mode of inheritance ==
Unlike CIPA and CIP which are considered hereditary due to their recessive inheritance this condition is dominantly inherited, which would make it genetic. This is due to the fact that although it can be inherited, all familial cases of a dominant disease are the result of an ancestor who first had a spontaneous mutation which wasn't present in the close relatives (including parents) of said ancestors;

Autosomal recessive inheritance means that for a person to exhibit a specific trait/disorder, both of their parents must have a copy of the mutated gene that causes the trait/disorder, in parents who carry the disorder, there is a 1 in 4 (or 25%) chance for one of their babies to be born with both copies of the gene and thus, express the trait

Autosomal dominant inheritance means that for a person to exhibit a specific trait/disorder, only one copy of a mutated gene is enough for the trait to be exhibited, and although this mutation can be inherited, it can also occur spontaneously, and due to its dominant nature over recessive genes, it expresses itself. In familial cases (where one of the parents carries the mutated gene), there is a 1 in 2 (or 50%) chance that one of their babies will be born with the mutation and thus, express the gene.

== Causes ==
Through a 3-generation Italian family, it was found that this condition was caused by an autosomal dominant point missense mutation in the ZFHX2 gene, in chromosome 14.

== Management ==
This condition (along with CIPA and CIP) doesn't have an agreed upon management, but the general tactic is to check an affected individual every once in a period of time (e.g. hourly) for injuries such as bruises. If an injury is suspected, methods such as radiography, CT scans, or magnetic resonance imaging should be done.

== Epidemiology ==
This condition is extremely rare; according to OMIM, only 17 cases from 4 families worldwide have been described in medical literature.

== Cases ==
The following list consists of all the cases of Marsili syndrome recorded in medical literature:

- 1960: Ervin and Sternbach describe 6 members from a 2-generation family with dominantly-inherited congenital insensitivity to pain.
- 1974: Comings and Amromin describe 3 members from a 2-generation family which consisted of a mother, her son and her daughter with the symptoms characteristic of Marsili syndrome, there was a possibility that the earlier generation (grandparent) was also affected.
- 1990: Landrieu et al. describes 2 members from a 2-generation family which consisted of a mother and her daughter. Nerve biopsies for both unmyelinated and myelinated fibers returned normal. Since the biological father of the daughter was unknown, this case could have been an instance of pseudodominance inheritance.
- 2018: Habib et al. describes 6 members from a 3-generation family from Italy, these individuals had a history of not experiencing pain to injuries of any sort (e.g. cutaneous burns, osseous fractures) which in turn didn't interfere with the use of body parts affected by said injuries. These individuals reported experiencing visceral pain, headaches and, when tested, didn't have an impaired ability to feel light touch, and (when also tested) had a reduced ability to feel capsaicin, which in turn let them eat spicy food calmly, which wouldn't be the case for people with normal pain sensation, and didn't suffer from congenital anosmia. (lifelong inability to smell from birth)

== Eponym ==
This condition was named after the family reported in 2018 by Habib et al.

== Media coverage ==
The most covered family in the media with this condition is the Italian family reported by Habib et al. in 2018, with various media companies worldwide reporting on the story, these articles often reassure viewers that not feeling pain is not a desirable "superpower", since it can turn dangerous in untreated and unmanaged cases.

Examples of media companies which have covered this condition (and the Italian family) include:

- NewAtlas
- ElSevier
- Smithsonian Magazine
- BBC
- ScienceAlert

This list does not comprise by any means all of the media companies which have reported on the condition, it is meant to show some of the various companies which have used it in one of their stories.

== See also ==
- Congenital insensitivity to pain
- Congenital insensitivity to pain with anhidrosis
- Hereditary sensory and autonomic neuropathy
