= Elizabeth Kujawinski =

American oceanographer

- Education: Woods Hole Oceanographic Institution; Massachusetts Institute of Technology
- Scientific career
- Workplaces: Woods Hole Oceanographic Institution; Barnard College; Columbia University
- Thesis: The effect of protozoan grazers on the cycling of polychlorinated biphenyls (PCBs) in marine systems (2000)

Elizabeth Kujawinski is an American oceanographer who is Senior Scientist at the Woods Hole Oceanographic Institution, where she works as Program Director of the Center for Chemical Currencies of a Microbial Planet. Her research considers analytical chemistry, chemical oceanography, microbiology and microbial ecology. She is interested in what controls the composition of organic materials in aquatic systems.

== Early life and education ==
Kujawinski was an undergraduate student at Massachusetts Institute of Technology (MIT). She was awarded the undergraduate teaching award from the Department of Chemistry. She moved to the Woods Hole Oceanographic Institution (WHOI) as a doctoral researcher, where she worked in chemical oceanography. Her doctoral research considered the effect of protozoan grazers on polychlorinated biphenyl cycling. After graduating Kujawinski joined the Ohio State University as a postdoctoral scholar.

== Research and career ==
Kujawinski joined the faculty at Barnard College in 2002, and held an adjunct position at Columbia University. She spent two years at Barnard College before being awarded a National Science Foundation CAREER Award and returning to the Woods Hole Oceanographic Institution.

In an effort to understand how cellular metabolism impacts biogeochemical cycles, Kujawinski studies intra- and extracellular metabolic profiles. This information allows Kujawinski to identify which factors influence microbial interactions and the transformation of dissolved organic matter. Marine organic matter comprises carbon compounds that contain heteroatoms such as oxygen, nitrogen and sulphur. She makes use of high-resolution mass spectrometry and automated high through-put methods to analyze the low molecular waste organic materials in seawater. The majority of this organic matter is found deep within the ocean, where it serves as an energy source for microorganisms. Kujawinski is interested in the interplay between marine organisms releasing organic matter and organic matter serving as a food source for microorganisms. For example, Kujawinski identified that dihydrocypropanesulfonate and N-Acetyltaurine are released into the ocean by Phytoplankton and later removed by bacteria. She works alongside the Bermuda Institute of Ocean Sciences to establish which chemical compounds are produced by microorganisms. She is also interested in how these microorganisms evolve and how they interact via zooplankton and viruses.

Kujawinski worked on the Deepwater Horizon oil spill. During the ten years after the spill, Kujawinski analyzed what had been learnt in the time following the disaster. She found that the oil spill had helped scientists learn how bacteria are degrading fossil fuels released within the ocean, how the sun catalyzes the breakdown of crude oil, the impact of dispersants and how different parts of the ecosystem recovered.

Kujawinski was appointed Director of the National Science Foundation Center for Chemical Currencies of a Microbial Planet in 2021. The Center looks to understand the behaviour of bioreactive molecules and ocean microbes.

== Selected publications ==
- Elizabeth B Kujawinski; Melissa C Kido Soule; David L. Valentine; Angela K Boysen; Krista Longnecker; Molly C Redmond (26 January 2011). "Fate of dispersants associated with the deepwater horizon oil spill". Environmental Science & Technology. 45 (4): 1298–1306. doi:10.1021/es103838p. ISSN 0013-936X. PMID 21265576. Wikidata Q39790028.
- R. T. Batey; M. Inada; E. Kujawinski; J. D. Puglisi; J. R. Williamson (1 September 1992). "Preparation of isotopically labeled ribonucleotides for multidimensional NMR spectroscopy of RNA". Nucleic Acids Research. 20 (17): 4515–4523. doi:10.1093/nar/20.17.4515. ISSN 0305-1048. PMC 334179. PMID 1383928. Wikidata Q40533977.
- Elizabeth B Kujawinski; Mark D Behn (1 July 2006). "Automated analysis of electrospray ionization fourier transform ion cyclotron resonance mass spectra of natural organic matter". Analytical Chemistry. 78 (13): 4363–4373. doi:10.1021/ac0600306. ISSN 0003-2700. PMID 16808443. Wikidata Q51938695.

== See also ==
- Outline of oceanography
