= Congenital insensitivity to pain =

Medical condition for inability to feel pain

- Other names: Congenital analgesia
- A patient and doctor discuss congenital insensitivity to pain
- Specialty: Neurology
- Symptoms: Inability to perceive pain, self-inflicted damage to the oral cavity or fingertips, repeated bone fractures, persistent ear infections, corneal damage and infection, and sometimes inability to sweat
- Types: HSANI, HSANII, HSANIII (familial dysautonomia), HSANIV (congenital insensitivity to pain with anhidrosis), and HSANV
- Causes: Various genetic mutations
- Treatment: Injury management and prevention

Congenital insensitivity to pain (CIP), also known as congenital analgesia, is an inability for a person to feel physical pain due to various rare genetic conditions. CIP is caused by genetic mutations that affect the development or function of nociceptors, the sensory neurons responsible for recognizing tissue damage. Common symptoms include damage to the mouth, repeated bone fractures, and sometimes the inability to sweat. Some forms of CIP are also correlated with intellectual disabilities, learning disabilities, or attention deficit hyperactivity disorder (ADHD). Hereditary sensory autonomic neuropathies (HSAN) fall under the umbrella of CIP. Methods of treatment are still being explored. The epidemiology of CIP is unclear, given the relatively low number of reported cases.

== Classification ==
The term congenital analgesia, also known as CIP, was first coined in the 1970s or 1980s. CIP is an umbrella term that describes a collection of rare genetic disorders that affect nerve tissue in either the peripheral or autonomic nervous systems. When genetic disorders interfere with nociceptors, an individual develops CIP. A 2019 paper argues that "congenital insensitivity to pain" is a misnomer, and theorizes that patients might still feel other (non-nociceptive) forms of pain, even if they are unable to accurately classify such sensations. The paper suggests "congenital nociceptor deficiency" as a possible alternative term. There are 5 types of HSAN that are classified as CIP disorders. As of 2025, the HSAN disorders are still classified using a system developed by Dyck P. J. in 1984.

== Signs and symptoms ==
For people with this disorder, cognition and sensation are otherwise normal; for instance, patients can still feel discriminative touch (though not always temperature), and there are generally no detectable physical abnormalities. Congenital insensitivity to pain with anhidrosis (CIPA) is a kind of CIP categorized by patients' inability to sweat (also known as HSAN-IV). The inability to regulate internal temperature can lead to unexplained persistent fevers.

- Note that in CIP caused by a mutation in the CLTCL1 gene, the sense of touch is lost along with the perception of pain.

Because children and adults with CIP cannot perceive pain, they may not respond to pain-inducing stimuli, putting them at a high risk for infections and complications resulting from injuries. Children with this condition often sustain self-inflicted damage, both in and around the oral cavity (such as having bitten off the tip of their tongue) or fractures to bones. Repeated bone fractures can lead to improper healing, potentially resulting in permanent joint damage, or in severe cases, Charcot joints. Many young children also present with persistent ear infections and damaged fingertips due to biting. Unnoticed infections and corneal damage due to foreign objects in the eye are also common. Particular strains of CIP put individuals at a higher risk for developing Staphylococcus aureus infections. Depending on the genetic cause of CIP, individuals may be intellectually impaired and may have conditions such as ADHD. The degree of the effect of CIP on the intellectual impairment of an individual has to do with the location of the mutation on the affected gene. The life expectancy of individuals with CIP is shorter than normal life expectancy.

There are generally two types of CIP:

- Nociceptors do not develop, meaning that painful stimulus is not even perceived. These are also known as the HSAN disorders.
- Nociceptors develop but do not respond to tissue signals, meaning that the patient can perceive the stimulus, but lacks an appropriate response.

== Causes ==
CIP is caused by extremely rare genetic disorders. Roughly 50% of CIP cases are inherited from a parent with CIP. Of the five HSAN disorders, HSAN II, III, IV, and V are inherited via an autosomal recessive pattern, while HSAN I is inherited via an autosomal dominant pattern. The breakdown of specific genetic mutation types among those diagnosed with CIP is unknown as of 2020. HSAN IV, one of the more common forms of CIP, is caused by a mutation in the NTRK1 gene (also known as TrkA).

=== Case studies ===
Various case studies have demonstrated how specific genetic mutations have led to CIP. In all cases, this disorder can be in the voltage-gated sodium channel SCN9A (Na_{v}1.7). There are three mutations in SCN9A: W897X, located in the P-loop of domain 2; I767X, located in the S2 segment of domain 2; and S459X, located in the linker region between domains 1 and 2. This results in a truncated non-functional protein. Na_{v}1.7 channels are expressed at high levels in nociceptive neurons of the dorsal root ganglia. As these channels are likely involved in the formation and propagation of action potentials in such neurons, it is expected that a loss-of-function mutation in SCN9A leads to abolished nociceptive pain propagation.

The PRDM12 gene is normally switched on during the development of pain-sensing nerve cells. People with homozygous mutations of the PRDM12 gene experience congenital insensitivity to pain (CIP).

Another gene implicated in human pain insensitivity is ZFHX2, which encodes zinc finger homeobox 2. A 2018 study analyzed six members of a family with inherited pain insensitivity and identified a "novel point mutation in ZFHX2, encoding a putative transcription factor expressed in small diameter sensory neurons" as the cause. As a therapeutic application, the study further discusses how "the ZFHX2 variant and downstream regulated genes associated with a human pain-insensitive phenotype are ... potential novel targets for the development of new analgesic drugs".

- Note that this condition in the ZFHX2 gene is also known as Marsili Syndrome. It occurs in only one family on earth, the Marsili family in Italy.
- Also note that Marsili syndrome presents with simply a hyposensitivity to pain and not a complete analgesia, this means that the person feels a reduction in the severity of painful stimuli but can still feel pain if the stimulus is extreme enough.

Jo Cameron is an example of one individual known to have congenital analgesia. She has two mutations, one in the gene encoding fatty acid amide hydrolase (FAAH) and one in the pseudogene FAAH-OUT modulating FAAH expression, which are theorized to be responsible for her condition. FAAH is an enzyme involved in the metabolism of endocannabinoids like anandamide. Cameron has high levels of anandamide and other endocannabinoids.

== Treatment ==
As of 2020, there is no agreed-upon method in the medical community for treating CIP. Treatment plans involve injury management and prevention. In an experimental trial, an opioid antagonist, naloxone, allowed a woman with CIP to experience pain for the first time. This result revealed that opioid antagonists like naloxone and naltrexone may be effective in treating CIP in the future. Additionally, the genes that cause CIP provide promising targets for novel analgesics.

== Epidemiology ==
A 2020 estimate places the incidence of CIP as one person in a million, based on the observation that under thirty cases are known in the United Kingdom. CIP is found at an abnormally high frequency in Vittangi, a village in Kiruna Municipality in northern Sweden, where nearly 40 cases have been reported.

== See also ==
- Pain asymbolia – Condition in which pain is experienced without unpleasantness
