= Redafamdastat =

Chemical compound

Clinical data
- Other names: JZP-150; JZP150; PF-04457845; PF-4457845; PF04457845; PF4457845
- Routes of administration: By mouth
- ATC code: None

Legal status
- Legal status: US: Investigational New Drug

Pharmacokinetic data
- Metabolism: CY3A4

Identifiers
- IUPAC name: N-pyridazin-3-yl-4-[(3-[5-(trifluoromethyl)pyridin-2-yl]oxyphenyl)methylidene]piperidine-1-carboxamide
- CAS Number: 1020315-31-4
- PubChem CID: 24771824
- ChemSpider: 26390839
- UNII: H4C81M8YYW
- ChEMBL: ChEMBL1651534
- CompTox Dashboard (EPA): DTXSID00144539

Chemical and physical data
- Formula: C_{23}H_{20}F_{3}N_{5}O_{2}
- Molar mass: 455.441 g·mol^{−1}
- 3D model (JSmol): Interactive image
- SMILES: n4ncccc4NC(=O)N(CC3)CC\C3=C/c2cc(ccc2)Oc(cc1)ncc1C(F)(F)F
- InChI: InChI=1S/C23H20F3N5O2/c24-23(25,26)18-6-7-21(27-15-18)33-19-4-1-3-17(14-19)13-16-8-11-31(12-9-16)22(32)29-20-5-2-10-28-30-20/h1-7,10,13-15H,8-9,11-12H2,(H,29,30,32); Key:BATCTBJIJJEPHM-UHFFFAOYSA-N

Redafamdastat (INN; developmental code names JZP-150, PF-04457845) is an inhibitor of the enzyme fatty acid amide hydrolase (FAAH), with an IC_{50} of 7.2 nM, and both analgesic and anti-inflammatory effects in animal studies comparable to those of the cyclooxygenase inhibitor naproxen. It was being developed by Jazz Pharmaceuticals for the treatment of alcoholism, pain, and post-traumatic stress disorder (PTSD) and reached phase 2 clinical trials. However, development of the drug was discontinued in December 2023.

== See also ==
- 4-Nonylphenylboronic acid
- LY-2183240
- EX-597
- BIA 10-2474
