= IDFP =

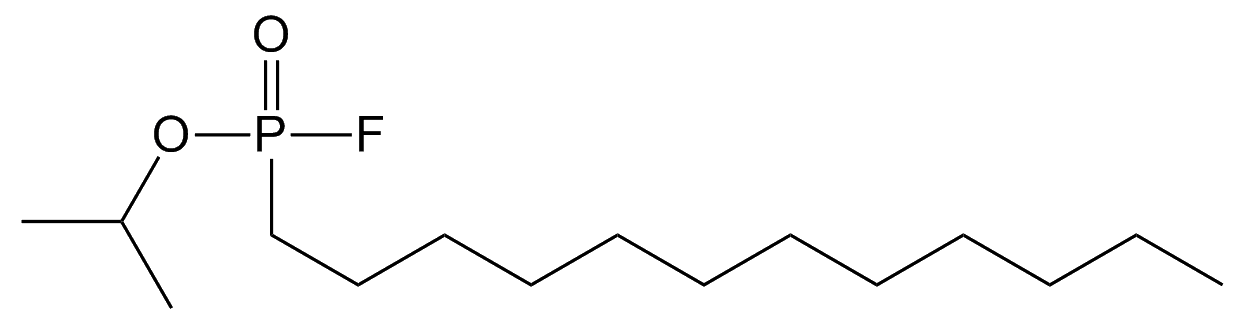

Names
- IUPAC name Isopropyl dodecylphosphonofluoridate
- Preferred IUPAC name Propan-2-yl dodecylphosphonofluoridate

Identifiers
CAS Number	615250-02-7
3D model (JSmol)	Interactive image
ChemSpider	21169067
PubChem CID	24762154
UNII	NP27DK66E8
CompTox Dashboard (EPA)	DTXSID00647212
- InChI: InChI=1S/C15H32FO2P/c1-4-5-6-7-8-9-10-11-12-13-14-19(16,17)18-15(2)3/h15H,4-14H2,1-3H3 Key: SFRALHFBKRAJPW-UHFFFAOYSA-N; InChI=1/C15H32FO2P/c1-4-5-6-7-8-9-10-11-12-13-14-19(16,17)18-15(2)3/h15H,4-14H2,1-3H3 Key: SFRALHFBKRAJPW-UHFFFAOYAG
- SMILES: O=P(F)(CCCCCCCCCCCC)OC(C)C

Properties
Chemical formula	C_{15}H_{32}FO_{2}P
Molar mass	294.391 g·mol^{−1}
- Except where otherwise noted, data are given for materials in their standard state (at 25 °C [77 °F], 100 kPa). Infobox references

IDFP is an organophosphorus compound related to the nerve agent sarin.

Like sarin, IDFP is an irreversible inhibitor for a number of different enzymes that normally serve to break down neurotransmitters, however the long alkyl chain of IDFP makes it dramatically weaker as an inhibitor of acetylcholinesterase (AChE), with an IC_{50} of only 6300 nM, while it is a potent inhibitor of two enzymes monoacylglycerol lipase (MAGL), the primary enzyme responsible for degrading the endocannabinoid 2-arachidonoylglycerol (2-AG), and fatty acid amide hydrolase (FAAH), the primary enzyme that degrades the other main endocannabinoid anandamide. The IC_{50} of IDFP is 0.8 nM at MAGL, and 3.0 nM at FAAH. Inhibition of these two enzymes causes markedly increased levels of both anandamide and 2-AG in the brain, resulting in increased cannabinoid signalling and typical cannabinoid behavioral effects in animal studies, while its lack of potency at AChE means that no cholinergic symptoms are produced.

Despite its similar chemical structure to the banned nerve agents, the long alkyl chain of IDFP causes it to fall outside the definition of "toxic chemicals" under the Chemical Weapons Convention, and since it also does not exhibit the potent AChE inhibition of related organophosphorus compounds, IDFP is not subject to the same stringent legal controls.

== See also ==
- Methoxy arachidonyl fluorophosphonate
- 4-Nonylphenylboronic acid
