= Jo Cameron =

Patient with little to no pain or negative affect

- Born: 1948 (age 77–78)
- Other names: Patient PFS
- Occupation: Retired teacher
- Known for: Famous patient with pain insensitivity and low negative affect associated with FAAH-related mutations and elevated endocannabinoid levels

Jo Cameron (born 1948; age 77–78 years), also known as Patient PFS, is a Scottish woman who feels no pain and experiences little to no anxiety or other aspects of negative affect.

She has two mutations, one in the gene encoding fatty acid amide hydrolase (FAAH) and one in the pseudogene FAAH-OUT modulating FAAH expression, which are theorized to be responsible for her condition. FAAH is an enzyme involved in the metabolism of endocannabinoids like anandamide. Cameron has high levels of anandamide and other endocannabinoids.

She was first presented as a published case report in 2019 and was subsequently featured widely in the mainstream media. Development of pharmaceutical drugs (specifically FAAH inhibitors) for treatment of pain and psychiatric disorders has been encouraged by her case.

== Clinical presentation ==
Cameron was identified at the age of 66 years when she underwent trapeziectomy surgery for severe hand osteoarthritis. This condition had led to deformity of her thumbs such that she could not hold a pen properly, although Cameron reported experiencing no pain from it. She had also developed severe hip osteoarthritis, resulting in lopsided walking abnormality noticed by others, but also reported no pain from this. She had undergone hip replacement surgery the year before at the age of 65. Recovery from trapeziectomy surgery is normally very painful or "excruciating". Cameron had assured her anesthesiologist, Dr. Devjit Srivastava, that she would not need painkillers for this surgery, to which Srivastava was skeptical.

Extraordinarily, Cameron indeed experienced no pain during recovery and required no analgesics. Her pain ratings were 0/10 and only paracetamol (acetaminophen; Tylenol) was administered, but this medication was routinely given to all patients by the nurses. Her surprising lack of pain led to further investigations by Srivastava. Review of her medical chart showed that she had also reported little to no pain with hip replacement, for which her pain scores were 0/10 or 1/10 once on the postoperative evening. Srivastava remained slightly skeptical until Cameron allowed him to perform a normally very painful maneuver used by anesthesiologists on patients who are having difficulty regaining consciousness following sedation. This maneuver involves pressing hard on the inner edges of the eye sockets, which results in strong pain that shocks people awake. Cameron felt no pain from the maneuver, instead experiencing only pressure. At that point, Srivastava developed a research protocol involving a team of highly regarded scientists from around the world in an attempt to figure out what was responsible for her lack of pain.

Cameron subjectively reported a lifetime lack of pain, including with childbirth, broken bones, and numerous burns and cuts. She had often not noticed burns and other injuries until she smelled burning flesh or saw blood on herself. Her burns and cuts also seemed to heal quickly with less or no scarring. Eating Scotch bonnet chili peppers left only a "pleasant glow". Attempts by researchers to induce pain, including burning her, sticking her with pins, and pinching her with tweezers until she bled, resulted in no pain. Aside from her lack of pain, Cameron was additionally described as characteristically happy, friendly, talkative, optimistic, and compassionate, as well as exceedingly affectionate and loving towards family members. Moreover, she was lacking in anxiety, depression, worry, fear, panic, grief, dread, and negative affect generally. She reported a long history of mild memory lapses and forgetfulness as well. Cameron also experienced characteristic severe nausea and vomiting caused by the opioid morphine that had been given to her postoperatively after hip replacement surgery.

== Genetic evaluation ==
Genetic testing revealed that she was heterozygous for a common hypomorphic single nucleotide polymorphism (SNP) in her FAAH gene (rs324420; C385A; C allele frequency 74%, A allele frequency 26%) that has been associated with reduced activity of the enzyme and increased anandamide levels as well as with decreased pain sensitivity, fear, and anxiety. As this polymorphism is common in the population however, it could not explain her presentation alone. In addition to the mutation in FAAH, Cameron showed a heterozygous microdeletions downstream of FAAH overlapping a pseudogene. This novel pseudogene was named FAAH-OUT and was considered likely to encode a long non-coding RNA (lncRNA). It was found to be expressed widely in tissues, including in the brain and the dorsal root ganglia of the spinal cord. The researchers hypothesized that the microdeletion negated the normal function of FAAH by reducing its expression.

Measurement of circulating endocannabinoid levels revealed that anandamide (N-arachidonoylethanolamine; AEA) levels were increased by 1.7-fold while oleoylethanolamide (OEA) and palmitoylethanolamide (PEA) levels were elevated by approximately 3-fold relative to several controls. Conversely, levels of 2-arachidonylglycerol (2-AG), another endocannabinoid mainly metabolized by a different enzyme called monoacylglycerol lipase (MAGL) rather than by FAAH, were largely unchanged relative to controls. Studies of FAAH knockout mice have found that brain levels of anandamide and other endocannabinoids are increased by 10- to 15-fold in several regions and this correlated well with analgesic and anxiolytic phenotypes in these animals. Endocannabinoids like anandamide are agonists of the cannabinoid receptors, such as the CB_{1} and CB_{2} receptors, among others. These receptors are the same molecular targets of the phytocannabinoids, like Δ^{9}-tetrahydrocannabinol (THC), that are present in cannabis.

Cameron's son was also heterozygous for the FAAH-OUT microdeletion, but did not also have the hypomorphic FAAH polymorphism, and had a lesser and only partial reduction in pain sensitivity. His psychological and affective characteristics were not described.

In spite of the preceding genetic and biochemical findings, it is not fully clear the extent to which Cameron's mutations in FAAH and FAAH-OUT are involved in her presentation. Hence, it has been stated that decreased FAAH expression remains only a possible causative factor.

A subsequent study by the team characterized the molecular basis of Cameron's FAAH-OUT-associated pain insensitivity, including changes in gene expression. They confirmed that her FAAH-OUT microdeletion reduced expression of FAAH. In addition, they found alterations that might help to explain her positive mood and low anxiety levels, for instance a dramatic increase in brain-derived neurotrophic factor (BDNF) expression in fibroblasts derived from Cameron. Systemic FAAH inhibition has been found to increase BDNF levels in the hippocampus by approximately 25% in mice. BDNF, signaling through its receptor tropomyosin receptor kinase B (TrkB), has been highly implicated in protecting against depression and in antidepressant action.

== Pharmaceutical development ==
Cameron's case has helped encourage interest in pharmaceutical development and repurposing of FAAH inhibitors for the treatment of pain and psychiatric disorders like depression and anxiety. FAAH inhibitors are under development for various medical uses and several have reached clinical trials, but none have reached the market as of 2023. The most advanced drug candidate is JNJ-42165279, which has reached phase 2 clinical trials for the treatment of anxiety disorders and pervasive child development disorders (e.g., autism spectrum disorders) and has also been studied in the treatment of anxious depression. However, clinical trials of FAAH inhibitors in the treatment of pain, anxiety, and depression have so far been unsuccessful or disappointing. Results in these studies have been less than would be suggested by Cameron's case or those observed in animal models, in which the drugs are highly effective. Potential reasons for these discrepancies include species differences between animals and humans, lack of predictive validity of animal models, differences between preclinical studies and clinical trial designs, and various others.

== See also ==
- S.M. (patient)
