= Loi Huriet Sérusclat =

French civil law

Loi Huriet-Sérusclat

French Parliament
- Long title: Loi n°88-1138 du 20 décembre 1988 relative à la protection des personnes se prêtant à des recherches biomédicales
- Enacted: 20 December 1988
- Introduced by: Claude Huriet, Franck Sérusclat
- Status: In force

The Loi du 20 décembre 1988 relative à la protection des personnes qui se prêtent à des recherches biomédicales, also known as the Loi Huriet or Loi Huriet-Sérusclat, is a French civil law to establish the regulation of those working in biomedical research, and to formalise the status quo of bioethics. It was proposed under the second government of Michel Rocard (Parti socialiste) six months after the 1988 French legislative election. It was the first French law that put clinical trials on a firm legal footing.

== First statute ==
An appendix, IIb, to the French civil code on Public Health, established the Comité consultatif de protection des personnes dans la recherche biomédicale (CCPPRB), later succeeded by the Comités de protection des personnes (CPP). Its ambit, defined in Article 15, established in law the notion of a consentement éclairé (a "Clear consent", perhaps similar to the Clean hands doctrine in common law), and established penalties for breaking the law.

The common name Loi Sérusclat-Huriet, and abbreviated variations such as Loi Huriet and Loi Sérusclat, come from the names of the nominator and seconder in the French senate, Claude Huriet (Centrist) and Franck Sérusclat (Socialist).

== Evolution ==
As cases came to court with the usual jurisprudence, (Note: A French judge has far more investigative powers than those in Common law jurisdictions.) public perception of the importance of bioethics and other European Union law, have supplemented the powers made under the original regulatory framework, such as French: Loi n°94-653 du 29 juillet 1994, relative au respect du corps humain ("Law of 29 July 1994, Respect of the human body"), which defined the legal notion of dignity, and Loi du 4 mars 2002 relative aux droits des malades et à la qualité du système de santé ("Law of 4 March 2002, Patient rights and the quality of health system").
