= Methoxy arachidonyl fluorophosphonate =

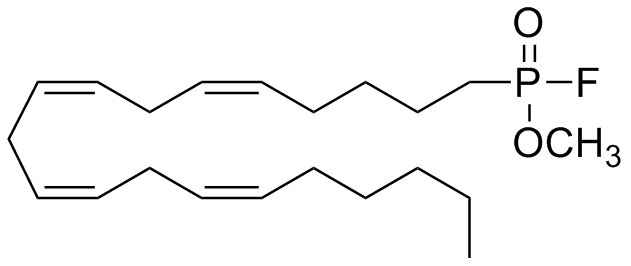

Names
- Preferred IUPAC name Methyl [(5Z,8Z,11Z,14Z)-icosa-5,8,11,14-tetraen-1-yl]phosphonofluoridate
- Other names MAFP

Identifiers
CAS Number	188404-10-6
3D model (JSmol)	Interactive image
ChEMBL	ChEMBL113262
ChemSpider	8604682
EC Number	201-185-2
PubChem CID	10429254
- InChI: InChI=1S/C21H36FO2P/c1-3-4-5-6-7-8-9-10-11-12-13-14-15-16-17-18-19-20-21-25(22,23)24-2/h7-8,10-11,13-14,16-17H,3-6,9,12,15,18-21H2,1-2H3/b8-7-,11-10-,14-13-,17-16- Key: KWKZCGMJGHHOKJ-ZKWNWVNESA-N
- SMILES: FP(=O)(OC)CCCC\C=C/C\C=C/C\C=C/C\C=C/CCCCC

Properties
Chemical formula	C_{21}H_{36}FO_{2}P
Molar mass	370.5
- Except where otherwise noted, data are given for materials in their standard state (at 25 °C [77 °F], 100 kPa). verify (what is ?) Infobox references

Methoxy arachidonyl fluorophosphonate, commonly referred as MAFP, is an irreversible active site-directed enzyme inhibitor that inhibits nearly all serine hydrolases and serine proteases. It inhibits phospholipase A2 and fatty acid amide hydrolase with special potency, displaying IC_{50} values in the low-nanomolar range. In addition, it binds to the CB_{1} receptor in rat brain membrane preparations (IC_{50} = 20 nM), but does not appear to agonize or antagonize the receptor, though some related derivatives do show cannabinoid-like properties.

== See also ==
- DIFP – diisopropyl fluorophosphate, a related inhibitor
- IDFP – isopropyl dodecylfluorophosphonate, another related inhibitor with selectivity for FAAH and MAGL
- Activity-based probes
