= FAAH2 =

Protein-coding gene in humans

Identifiers
- Aliases: FAAH2, AMDD, fatty acid amide hydrolase 2
- External IDs: OMIM: 300654; GeneCards: FAAH2
Enzyme activity
EC #	BRENDA	ExPASy	KEGG	MetaCyc
3.5.1.99	↗	↗	↗	↗

Gene location (Human)
Chr.	X chromosome (human)
Band	Xp11.21	Start	57,286,706 bp
Band	Xp11.21	End	57,489,193 bp
RNA expression pattern
Bgee	Human / Mouse (ortholog); Top expressed in: right uterine tube; body of pancreas; right lobe of liver; olfactory zone of nasal mucosa; pituitary gland; anterior pituitary; islet of Langerhans; skin of abdomen; skin of leg; minor salivary glands / n/a; More reference expression data
BioGPS	n/a
Gene ontology
Molecular function	hydrolase activity; fatty acid amide hydrolase activity
Cellular component	integral component of membrane; lipid droplet; membrane
Biological process	arachidonic acid metabolic process
Sources:Amigo / QuickGO
Orthologs
Databases	NCBI: entry; OMA: entry
Species	Human	Mouse
Entrez	158584	n/a
Ensembl	ENSG00000165591	n/a
UniProt	Q6GMR7	n/a
RefSeq (mRNA)	NM_174912; NM_001353840; NM_001353841	n/a
RefSeq (protein)	NP_777572; NP_001340769; NP_001340770	n/a
Location (UCSC)	Chr X: 57.29 – 57.49 Mb	n/a
PubMed search		n/a
- Wikidata
View/Edit Human

Fatty acid amide hydrolase 2 or FAAH2 is a member of the serine hydrolase family of enzymes.

Fatty acid amide hydrolase 2 degrades many types of fatty acid amides, including the sleep-inducing oleamide and endocannabinoids such as anandamide. It has a tissue distribution quite distinct from the paralogous FAAH (or "FAAH1"). Compared to FAAH, it is less active on N-acyl ethanolamines (e.g. anandamide) and N-acyl taurines.

OrthoDB indicates that FAAH2 (as a gene distinct from FAAH) has orthologs all across Metazoa, with the notable exclusion of rodents. This complicates the translation of FAAH-related results from rodent models to human biology.

== Clinical significance ==
Defects in this enzyme have been associated with neurologic and psychiatric disorders. Specifically, a Canadian male with autism, anxiety, severe dysarthria, and a number of other issues have a Ala458Ser mutation inherited from his healthy carrier mother. In cell models this mutation is associated with a decreased function of this gene. This patient has a very abnormal blood lipid composition consistent with a loss of function.

ClinVar reports a missense mutation that produces an early stop codon (Trp392Ter) is associated with Meckel-like syndrome.

UniProt Variant Viewer lists a large number of other variants found in surveyed human genomes. Several are predicted to have consequences by PolyPhen and/or SIFT.
