= Theralizumab =

Monoclonal antibody

Monoclonal antibody
- Type: Whole antibody
- Source: Humanized (from mouse)
- Target: CD28

Clinical data
- Routes of administration: intravenous
- ATC code: none

Legal status
- Legal status: investigational

Identifiers
- CAS Number: 906068-56-2
- ChemSpider: none
- UNII: POO0DOD3AS

Theralizumab (also known as TGN1412, CD28-SuperMAB, and TAB08) is an immunomodulatory drug developed by immunologist Thomas Hünig of the University of Würzburg. It was withdrawn from development after inducing severe inflammatory reactions as well as chronic organ failure in the first-in-human study by Parexel in London in March 2006. The developing company, TeGenero Immuno Therapeutics (TeGenero), a spin-off of the University of Würzburg around immunologist Thomas Hünig, co-founder and chief scientific officer (CSO) Thomas Hanke and chief executive officer (CEO) Benedikte Hatz went bankrupt later that year. The commercial rights were then acquired by a Russian startup, TheraMAB. The drug was renamed TAB08. Phase I and II clinical trials have been completed for rheumatoid arthritis and clinical trials have been initiated for cancer.

Originally intended for the treatment of B cell chronic lymphocytic leukemia (B-CLL) and rheumatoid arthritis, TGN1412 is a humanised monoclonal antibody that not only binds to, but is a strong agonist for, the CD28 receptor of the immune system's T cells. CD28 is the co-receptor for the T cell receptor; it binds to receptors on the interacting partner in the reaction through one of its ligands (B7 family).

The drug, which was designated as an orphan medical product by the European Medicines Agency in March 2005, was developed by TeGenero, tested by Parexel and manufactured by Boehringer Ingelheim. TeGenero announced the first elucidation of the molecular structure of CD28 almost exactly one year prior to commencement of the TGN1412 phase I clinical trial.

== Production ==
Mice of the inbred strain BALB/c were immunized with recombinant human CD28-Fc fusion proteins and boosted with a B lymphoma cell line transfected to express human CD28. Hybridomas were obtained by fusing B cells with the hybridoma partner X63Ag8.653 and screened for reactivity with human CD28 and TCR-independent mitogenic activity. Two monoclonals called 5.11A1 and 9D7 were identified. The more active of the two, 5.11A1, is a mouse IgG1 immunoglobulin.

The complementarity-determining regions of 5.11A1 were cloned into the framework of human IgG and combined with IgG1 (TGN1112) or IgG4 (TGN1412) constant regions. According to the company's Investigator Brochure, "TGN1412 is a humanised monoclonal antibody directed against the human CD28 antigen. The molecule was genetically engineered by transfer of the complementarity determining regions (CDRs) from heavy and light chain variable region sequences of a monoclonal mouse anti-humanC28 [sic] antibody (5.11A1, Luhder et al., 2003) into human heavy and light chain variable frameworks. Humanised variable regions were subsequently recombined with a human gene coding for the IgG4 gamma chain and with a human gene coding for a human kappa chain, respectively."

The recombinant genes were transfected into Chinese hamster ovary cells and the recombinant antibody harvested from culture supernatant.

== Pharmacology ==
=== Mechanism of action ===
T lymphocyte activation pathway is triggered when a T cell encounters its cognate antigen, coupled to an MHC molecule, on the surface of an infected cell or a phagocyte.

Activation of T cells normally requires both engagement of the antigen receptor (signal 1) and co-stimulation (signal 2). Studies of monoclonal antibodies specific for mouse, rat, or human CD28 identified so-called "superagonistic" antibodies that could stimulate T cells without concurrent antigen-receptor stimulation (signal 1). Whether this activity represents a stronger activity or a different activity is uncertain.

Two antibodies specific for human CD28 were identified. The more active of the two, TGN1112 (originally called 5.11A1), belonged to the IgG1 class of immunoglobulins. The other, TGN1412 (clone 9D7), belonged to the IgG4 class. The TCR-independent agonism of these antibodies involved binding to a specific part of the CD28 molecule called the C"D loop. It was initially hypothesized that an antibody with this property could be therapeutically useful in stimulating the immune system in immunosuppressed patients. However, in vitro and in vivo data from animal studies later suggested that administration would lead to preferential activation of regulatory T cells, leading to a net effect of T-cell downregulation. On its website, the company wrote: "A pronounced T-cell activation and expansion mediated by CD28-SuperMAB in animal models is accompanied by the expression of anti-inflammatory cytokines, like IL-10, rather than by the severe cytokine release syndrome of pro-inflammatory mediators induced by other agents that address the TCR complex.". As it turned out, the results of the first trial in humans indicate that this may not always be the case.

A new explanation for the trial mishap was suggested by the findings of a paper in Clinical Immunology. Pillai et al. found that all T cells that get activated using conventional TCR-mediated stimulation become regulatory for a brief time and express FOXP3. However, eventually most of these cells downregulate their regulatory capabilities and become effector cells. Thus, attempts to induce FOXP3+ T cells might also induce effector cells capable of causing tissue damage.

Other cells activated by CD28 ligation in humans are eosinophil granulocytes. They can release IFN-γ, IL-2, IL-4, and IL-13. However, most in vitro experiments are limited to the use of purified peripheral blood mononuclear cells (PBMN's) that do not contain those cells.

To function as an agonist, it has been suggested that TGN1412 needs to be a whole antibody, including the constant (Fc) region. According to a report by TeGenero, the F(ab)2 is not able to generate the required stimulation. Unlike the related clone TGN1112, an IgG1, TGN1412 is of the subclass IgG4. This choice was made as TGN1112 showed antibody-dependent cellular cytotoxicity on CD28+ Jurkat cells. Thus the function of antibody binding via an Fcγ receptor seems to be a requirement for the immune regulation. However, cell opsonisation by antibody leads normally to phagocytosis of the labeled cells, as seen in the case of HIV.

== History ==
In its first human clinical trials, it caused catastrophic systemic organ failures in the subjects, despite being administered at a supposed sub-clinical dose of 0.1 mg per kg, some 500 times lower than the dose found safe in animals. All six volunteers who were administered the drug were hospitalized between 12 and 16 hours later. At least four of them had multiple organ dysfunction.

The Phase I clinical trials were conducted by Parexel at an independent clinical trials unit in leased space on the premises of Northwick Park and St. Mark's Hospital, London, on 13 March 2006. Parexel is a company that carries out drug trials on behalf of pharmaceutical and biotechnology companies. Healthy volunteers were recruited to the study with a £2,000 fee. The trial resulted in hospitalization of all six volunteers administered the drug, at least four of whom had multiple organ dysfunction. The trial was a double-blind, randomized, placebo-controlled study, with two of the eight subjects receiving a placebo, and six receiving 1/500th of the highest dose used in previous experiments with cynomolgus macaques. All six of the trial subjects who received the drug were male, aged 19 to 34 (median 29.5); none had a notable medical history, and all were well in the 2 weeks before the trial. The drug was given by intravenous infusion, starting at 8 am, with an interval of around 10 minutes between patients, and each infusion lasting from 3 to 6 minutes. Roughly fifty minutes after the first participant received his dose, he complained of a headache, and soon afterwards fever and pain. He took his shirt off, complaining that he felt like he was burning. Shortly after, the remaining participants who received the actual drug also became ill, vomiting and complaining of severe pain. The first patient was transferred to the Northwick Park Hospital's intensive care unit 12 hours after infusion, with the others following within the next 4 hours. A severely affected volunteer, Mohammed Abdalla, a 28-year-old, was described as having developed a ballooned head. This led to his description as being similar to the "Elephant Man". A volunteer also lost his fingers and toes as a result of being injected with the drug.

All of the men were reported to have experienced severe cytokine release syndrome resulting in angioedema, swelling of skin and mucous membranes, akin to the effects of the complement cascade in severe allergic reaction. The patients were treated with corticosteroids to reduce inflammation, and plasma-exchange to attempt to remove TGN1412 from their circulation. Paradoxically, some kinds of the men's white blood cells (lymphocytes and monocytes, involved in immune responses) had vanished almost completely several hours after administration of TGN1412.

According to a press release on 5 July 2006 from North West London Hospitals NHS Trust, where the men were treated, the patients continued to improve and "five of them went home within a month of the incident, while one patient remained in hospital until 26 June, when he also went home".

TGN1412 had not previously been given to humans, however the trial was preceded by animal testing, including in non-human primates. The company claims that these did not indicate any safety issues, and this was supported in subsequent MHRA reports. The US patent application states "it could be shown in a pilot study that an in vitro administration of anti-human CD28-SuperMAB induces in a rhesus monkey in vivo a profound activation of T cells, without clinically visible side effects" and goes on to say "This antibody—in spite of its strong T cell-stimulatory properties—is very well tolerated in vivo, in contrast to all other known T cell activating substances."

Structure of human CD28

TeGenero apologised to the families involved soon after the events, insisting that the effects were completely unexpected, and that all protocols were followed. In an initial review of pre-clinical data and the protocol, the MHRA stated there was nothing to cause concern, and that the trial was correctly authorised. Participants who were harmed in the drug trial received some additional financial compensation later, which one participant used to hire a personal trainer so he could regain physical fitness.

=== Investigations ===
The Medicines and Healthcare products Regulatory Agency (MHRA) issued an interim report on the TGN1412 trial on 5 April 2006, followed by a final report on 25 May 2006. It found no deficiencies in TeGenero's pre-clinical work and no evidence of undisclosed studies. Parexel's records and processes appeared in order, including dose measurement and administration, and no deficiencies were found that may have led to contamination or overdose. The MHRA felt that their actions did not contribute to the serious adverse events. German regulatory authorities inspected the production of the material by Boehringer Ingelheim, looking at the manufacture, testing, storage and distribution of the TGN1412, but no deficiencies were identified which could have contributed to the serious adverse effects.

The MHRA concluded that the most likely cause of the reaction in trial subjects was an unpredicted biological action of the drug in humans. The UK Secretary of State for Health agreed to establish a group of leading international experts to consider those issues and to provide a report on the future authorization of such trials with an interim report at three months, with Gordon Duff, Professor of Molecular Medicine at Sheffield University, as Chair of the group. Until the expert group reported, all further clinical trial applications involving first-in-humans trials of any monoclonal antibody or other novel molecules targeting the immune system were not to be authorised in the UK.

In December 2006, the final report of the Expert Group on Phase One Clinical Trials was published. It found that the trial had not considered what constituted a safe dose in humans, and that then-current law had not required it. It made 22 recommendations, including the need for independent expert advice before a high-risk study was allowed, testing only one volunteer at a time (sequential inclusion of participants) in case there were rapid ill effects, and administering drugs slowly by infusion rather than as an injection.

=== Follow up publications ===
The trial has become subject of several academic publications.

In 2007, immunologists from the Paul Ehrlich Institute, the German Federal Agency for Sera and Vaccines, reviewed Germany's regulatory requirements in the aftermath of the TGN1412 trial. They suggested that the predictive value of pre-clinical animal models required reevaluation, dose fixing needed refinement or redesign, and criteria for high-risk antibodies needed to be established. Additionally, they suggested that pre-Phase I studies were needed to calculate a dose with a pre-clinical "No effect" level, rather than a No-observed-adverse-effect level.

Scientists in early 2007 put forth the theory that the drug acted in a different fashion in humans as compared with the laboratory animals in which the drug was first tried. The severe reactions in humans could have only occurred, they believe, in those with memory T lymphocytes. Animals raised in a sterile lab would presumably have no 'memory' of previous illnesses, thus would not exhibit the severe reactions that occurred in the human subjects. However this is a misunderstanding of the research: the research says that lab animals studied have fewer memory T cells than humans, and that stimulation through the CD28 receptor alone in memory T cells causes them to infiltrate organs and also activates them.

Experimental in-vitro research and modelling, published in 2008, suggested that the 0.1 mg per kg starting dose would bind to 86 to 91% of all CD28 receptors in the body, resulting in a possible higher than expected effect even at very low starting doses.

In 2009, the UK National Institute for Biological Standards and Control wrote that a near-maximum immuno-stimulatory dose had been given, because a safe starting dose in man had been calculated "based upon results from pre-clinical safety testing in a non-responsive species" (Macaca fascicularis). It reported that the European guidelines for first-in-man phase-I clinical trials of biologics had been revised.

In 2010, the failure to predict a severe cytokine release syndrome in humans was explained. In vitro data revealed that the CD4+ effector memory T-cells of Macaca fascicularis, the species of primate used for pre-clinical safety testing of TGN1412, lack CD28 expression. Since CD28 is the target of the TGN1412 antibody, M. fascicularis effector T-cells could not be stimulated by the drug.

In 2013, it was described that standard pro-inflammatory markers TNFα and IL-8 are not predictive of the unusual pro-inflammatory response to TGN1412, and gave a false negative result. IL-2 release and lymphoproliferation are more helpful predictors of the response.

In 2016, a study carried out on humanized mice evaluated TGN1412's effects on the immune system, and confirmed that it could cause cytokine release syndrome, destruction of white blood cells, and other negative effects observed during the initial human trial.

== Controversies ==
Critics argued that the company should have anticipated that the drug would provoke a severe reaction in humans. An immunologist contacted by New Scientist and who wished to remain anonymous said "You don't need to be a rocket scientist to work out what will happen if you non-specifically activate every T cell in the body." While the drug had appeared to be safe in animal models, researchers noted that there were reasons why these may not be indicative of the response in humans, particularly with respect to this type of drug. The BBC reported that two of twenty monkeys used in earlier testing experienced an increase in the size of their lymph nodes, and that this fact was shared with the men participating in the study, and submitted to regulators. TeGenero said this was transient and was evidence of the extra T cells that the drug produces. Experiments with another drug affecting the CD28 receptor (but to a lesser extent than TGN1412) had also shown side effects in human trials. There have been criticisms that the risks taken and the design of the protocol were insufficiently justified by proper statistical evidence.

Critics of animal testing have cited the case to argue that experiments on nonhuman animals, even in species closely related to humans, are not necessarily predictive of human responses, and cannot justify the harm inflicted on animals or the resultant risks to humans.

TGN1412 was created to perfectly fit inside the CD28 receptor of humans. Animal trials on mice were not necessarily predictive of human responses, as it would require a much greater dosage to get the same level of immunoactivity as in a human.

The human clinical trial of TGN1412 was the subject of the 2017 BBC docudrama The Drug Trial: Emergency at the Hospital.

== See also ==
- Adverse effect (medicine)
- Clinical trial protocol
- Pharmacovigilance
- BIA 10-2474
- Co-stimulation
- Drug development
- Pre-clinical development
- EudraVigilance
