= Pain asymbolia =

Condition in which pain is experienced without unpleasantness

Pain asymbolia, also called pain dissociation, is a condition in which pain is experienced without unpleasantness. This usually results from injury to the brain, lobotomy, cingulotomy, or morphine analgesia. Preexisting lesions of the insula may abolish the aversive quality of painful stimuli while preserving the location and intensity aspects. Typically, patients report they have pain but are not bothered by it; they recognize the sensation of pain but are mostly or completely immune to suffering from it. The pathophysiology of this disease revolves around a disconnect between the insular cortex secondary to damage and the limbic system, specifically the cingulate gyrus, whose prime response to the pain perceived by the insular cortex is to tether it with an agonizing emotional response, thus signaling the individual of its propensity to inflict actual harm. However, a disconnect is not the only prime causative factor, as damage to these cortical structures also results in the same symptomology.

== See also ==
- Psychological pain
- Suffering
- Congenital insensitivity to pain
