= 4-Nonylphenylboronic acid =

Chemical compound

Clinical data
- ATC code: None

Identifiers
- IUPAC name: 4-Nonylphenylboronic acid
- CAS Number: 256383-45-6
- PubChem CID: 4589192
- ChemSpider: 3781380
- UNII: 2SY8DS7Y3D
- CompTox Dashboard (EPA): DTXSID10404611

Chemical and physical data
- Formula: C_{15}H_{25}BO_{2}
- Molar mass: 248.17 g·mol^{−1}
- 3D model (JSmol): Interactive image
- SMILES: CCCCCCCCCc1ccc(B(O)O)cc1
- InChI: InChI=1S/C15H25BO2/c1-2-3-4-5-6-7-8-9-14-10-12-15(13-11-14)16(17)18/h10-13,17-18H,2-9H2,1H3; Key:VONVJOGSLHAKOX-UHFFFAOYSA-N

4-Nonylphenylboronic acid is a potent and selective inhibitor of the enzyme fatty acid amide hydrolase (FAAH), with an IC_{50} of 9.1nM, and 870x selectivity for FAAH over the related enzyme MAGL, which it inhibits with an IC_{50} of 7900nM. It is also a weaker inhibitor of the enzymes endothelial lipase and lipoprotein lipase, with IC_{50} values of 100 nM and 1400 nM respectively.

== See also ==
- IDFP
- LY-2183240
- URB-597
