= Franck Sérusclat =

French politician (1921–2006)

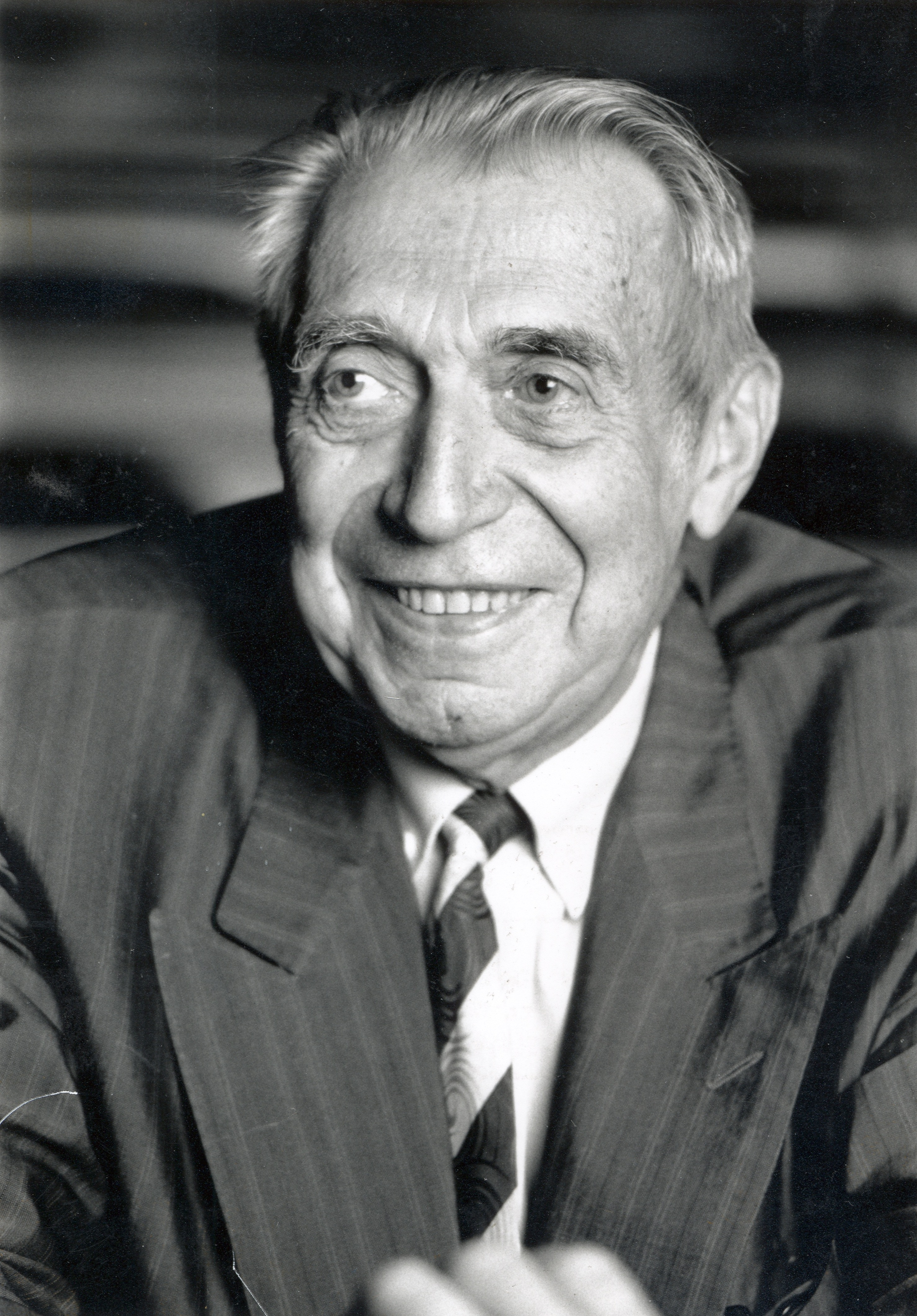
Franck Sérusclat

Franck André Sérusclat (7 July 1921 in Sarras, Ardèche – 2 July 2006) was a French politician. He was a long-serving mayor and member of the French senate for the Rhône department.

== Biography ==
Sérusclat was born in Sarras, Ardèche, where his father had settled to become a teacher, after World War I. His first and middle names are those of his uncles who were killed in the war.

His secondary education was at the Lycée de Privas, whence he went to the Faculty of Pharmacy at Lyon, where he started a deep friendship with André Boucherle. He was awarded his diploma on 27 March 1947. He worked as a monitor in the Department of Toxicology, and wrote his thesis under the direction of Marc Chambon. He became an assistant in the Lyon police's forensic lab, which had been set up in 1910 by Edmond Locard. He worked there over thirty years, becoming assistant director, and then director.

At the end of December 1949. he opened a pharmacy (dispensing chemist) at Saint-Fons, where he trained many other pharmacists. He was an active participant in the central Fédération des Syndicats Pharmaceutiques de France (FSPF), and in the local Rhône chapter.

He became actively involved in politics. In 1955, he created with André Boucherle the comité lyonnais du mouvement pour les États-Unis d'Europe ("Lyon movement for a United States of Europe"). He organized meetings and exchanges with other European pharmacists' organizations. Always rather provocative, he took a position for the legalization of cannabis, at a time when its use was negligible compared to that of alcohol or tobacco. However, the toxicity of cannabis, and its causation of accidents, had perhaps been underestimated.

Sérusclat always had a great interest in education and public information. Convinced of the use of information technology in schools, in 2000 he published l'École républicaine et numérique (in French).. He wanted every student to have a computer. usage

He was a member of the Société de Pharmacie de Lyon for over fifty years.

Sérusclat was married first to Cécile Pasquier (died 1982), then to Paule Sassard.

== Political career ==
Sérusclat was a member of the French Parti socialiste, which had a manifesto for pacifism and a pan-European state. He campaigned on many causes throughout his long career, but his main drive was in public health and bioethics. To this end, he was the joint proposer, in the French senate, of the loi Huriet-Sérusclat de 1988 relative à la protection des personnes dans la recherche biomédicale. He also argued for better regulation of sea fishing, for the sustainability of fish stocks.

With an innovative spirit, if somewhat lacking in humour, he contributed to the 1981 Pharmacy Green Paper under Prime Minister Pierre Mauroy for the creation of mobile pharmacies to supply rural villages, as some grocers still did at the time. This caused something of a sensation in the pharmacist world. In the same paper, he also proposed to pay pharmacists a consultation fee or prescription charge, as was done in other parts of the health profession.

With Claude Huriet seconding, he passed the Loi relative à la protection des personnes dans la recherche biomédicale ("Law relating to the protection of those involved in biomedical research") on 20 December 1988, which established the French legal framework for clinical trials.

== Offices ==
- Mayor of Saint-Fons, 1967–1995
- Member of the French Senate for Rhône department 25 September 1977 – 1 November 1999. Succeeded by Gérard Collomb.

== Decorations ==
- Knight of the Legion of Honour
