= PRDM12 =

Protein-coding gene in the species Homo sapiens

Identifiers
- Aliases: PRDM12, PFM9, HSAN8, PR domain 12, PR/SET domain 12
- External IDs: OMIM: 616458; MGI: 2685844; GeneCards: PRDM12
Available structures
PDB	Ortholog search: PDBe RCSB
PDB	List of PDB id codes 3EP0

Gene location (Human)
Chr.	Chromosome 9 (human)
Band	9q34.12	Start	130,664,594 bp
Band	9q34.12	End	130,682,986 bp

Gene location (Mouse)
Chr.	Chromosome 2 (mouse)
Band	2|2 B	Start	31,530,049 bp
Band	2|2 B	End	31,545,807 bp
RNA expression pattern
Bgee	Human / Mouse (ortholog); Top expressed in: buccal mucosa cell; pericardium; globus pallidus; internal globus pallidus; jejunum; prefrontal cortex; hypothalamus; hippocampal formation; temporal lobe; mesencephalon / Top expressed in: spinal ganglia; neural tube; trigeminal ganglion; ventricular zone; ganglion of neuraxis; glossopharyngeal ganglion; superior colliculus; septum of telencephalon; neural groove; inferior colliculi; More reference expression data
BioGPS	n/a
Gene ontology
Molecular function	methyltransferase activity; transferase activity; DNA binding; metal ion binding; nucleic acid binding; histone methyltransferase binding; DNA-binding transcription factor activity, RNA polymerase II-specific; RNA polymerase II transcription regulatory region sequence-specific DNA binding; chromatin DNA binding; sequence-specific DNA binding; DNA-binding transcription factor activity
Cellular component	nucleus
Biological process	neurogenesis; methylation; regulation of transcription, DNA-templated; transcription, DNA-templated; positive regulation of histone H3-K9 dimethylation; sensory perception of pain; neuron projection development; detection of temperature stimulus involved in sensory perception of pain; positive regulation of histone H3-K9 methylation; regulation of transcription by RNA polymerase II
Sources:Amigo / QuickGO
Orthologs
Databases	NCBI: entry; OMA: entry
Species	Human	Mouse
Entrez	59335	381359
Ensembl	ENSG00000130711	ENSMUSG00000079466
UniProt	Q9H4Q4	A2AJ77
RefSeq (mRNA)	NM_021619	NM_001123362
RefSeq (protein)	NP_067632	NP_001116834
Location (UCSC)	Chr 9: 130.66 – 130.68 Mb	Chr 2: 31.53 – 31.55 Mb
PubMed search
- Wikidata
View/Edit Human	View/Edit Mouse

PR domain zinc finger protein 12 is a protein that in humans is encoded by the PRDM12 gene. This gene is normally switched on during the development of pain-sensing nerve cells. People with homozygous mutations of the PRDM12 gene experience congenital insensitivity to pain (CIP). PRMD12 is a part of a larger protein complex that indirectly controls gene expression through histone methylation. The activity of the protein complex regulates histone structure in order to control gene expression.

== Structure ==
The human protein isoform is made up of 367 amino acids containing a PR domain (related to the SET methyltransferase domain), 3 zinc fingers, and a C-terminal polyalanine tract.

== Function ==
PRDM12 influences the development of nerve cells that assist in perception and sensation of pain, which is an important evolutionary advantage. In humans, mutations in the PRDM12 gene can cause loss of pain perception brought on by defects in the development of sensory neurons. It also has a range of interactions with and affects on various proteins. In vertebrates, PRDM12 directly represses the DBX1 and NKX6 genes. This is thought to be accomplished by utilizing G9a, a strong H3K9 methyltransferase. The indicated result of PRDM12's cross-repressive interaction with the DBX1 and NKX6 genes is that the PRDM12 partially acts as a promoter of V1 interneurons (which are essential to the locomotion of vertebrates). It is a member of the group of PR- domain-containing zinc-finger familyfingers, "which appear to function as negative regulators of oncogenesis and include the tumor-associated genes MDS1-EVI1, RIZ, BLIMP1, MEL1 and PFM1. PRDM12 therefore represents an attractive candidate tumour suppressor gene within the der(9) [derivative chromosome 9] CDR [commonly deleted region]." Several members of the PRDM family are found to be acting as a tumor suppressor or a factor driving oncogenic processes in human diseases, specifically and most notably in solid cancers and hematological malignancies. It is hoped that further study may reveal target genes of PRDM proteins so a greater understanding of the functions of the PRDM family can be achieved. In Xenopus embryos, PRDM12 expression "was partially co-localized with the lateral expression regions" of the SIX1, PAX3, ISLET1, and PAX6 genes, but not those of the FOXD3 and SIX3 genes. In cases where BMP4 was overexpressed, embryos showed an increase in PRDM12 expression. Data indicated that the regulation of PRDM12 expression in Xenopus embryos was controlled by BMP and Wnt signaling.

PRDM12 codes for a protein which regulates the neurological path through which pain in perceived, known as PR domain zinc finger protein 12. The protein plays a vital role in the regulation of histone H3-K9 dimethylation. PRDM12's protein also directly affects the development of nerve-endings. The protein is synthesized at the same developmental point as the neurons which sense pain and the growth of the two is linked. The mutation of this gene results in a non-functioning protein, which in-turn causes a failure to develop the pain-sensing nerve endings and an organism without sensitivity to pain. This lack of pain-sensing nerve endings can cause severe harm to the individual, as they cannot sense when they are injured by something such as a hot stove-eye or broken bone. PRDM12's protein has also been found to be a tumor suppressor for chronic myloid leukemia. The protein controls gene expression by modifying chromatin. PRDMs as a family tend to require enzyme help to modify histones, with some exceptions.

== Clinical significance ==
In humans, mutations in the PRDM12 gene can cause loss of pain perception brought on by defects in the development of sensory neurons. There are a number of diseases and conditions that can result from mutations in the PRDM12 gene.

Congenital insensitivity to pain (CIP) is a characterized by an inability to feel pain. This is a rare condition that is present at birth due to a lack of, or malfunction of, nociceptors. There are three different genes that can be mutated to cause CIP. First, a mutation in the SCN9A makes it impossible for nociceptors to respond to harmful stimuli because it causes the gene to lose its function. Second, a mutation in the NTRK1 causes a loss of function for the gene and leads to a failure in nociceptor development. Finally, researchers have identified 10 homozygous mutations on PRDM12 that appeared to be linked to this condition. Past research has shown that PRDM12 is involved in the modification of chromatin. Chromatin can turn genes off and on by attaching itself to chromosomes and acting as an epigenetic switch. Chromatin play a huge role in neuron development, so researcher hypothesized that mutations in the PRDM12 gene prevent nociceptors and nerve fibers from developing normally. They then studied the nerve biopsies of patients with this condition and found that the patients affected by this condition are lacking pain sensing never fibers in their legs, or only have half the amount they should have.

Another condition caused by mutations in the PRDM12 gene is hereditary sensory and autonomic neuropathy type VIII. HSAN VIII is a very rare autosomal recessive inherited disorder that also begins at birth and is characterized by an inability to feel pain and an inability to sweat (anhidrosis). Anhidrosis can cause frequent episodes of high body temperature of high fever. Other signs of this condition can include early loss of teeth, server soft tissue injuries, dental caries and submucosal abscesses, hypomineralization of primary, and mandibular osteomyelitis. Abnormal functioning of the sensory nerves is what causes the sensory loss in patients with this condition.

A third condition that may be caused by a mutation in the PRDM12 gene is Midface toddler excoriation syndrome (MiTES). MiTES is an newly discovered condition that has recently been reported in three children who were unrelated. Persistent scratching around the nose and eyes from the first year of life results in deep, scarring wounds in the patients with this condition. Doctors say because of these wounds, it is easy to mistake this condition with child abuse. Researchers found that four out of the five patients with MiTES have the same autosomal recessive mutations in the PRDM12 gene that causes HSAN VIII.

Members of the PRDM family have all been connected to over-expression, epigentic splicing, deletion, or mutations in various types of cancer. PRDM12 in particular has been found to play a role in Chronic myeloid leukaemia, which is a clonal stem cell disorder. Researchers mapped the microdeletions and identified a minimal common deleted region. Within this common deleted region was the PRDM12 gene. Because the PRDM family appears to includes tumor suppressor genes and functions as negative regulators of oncogenesis, PDRM12 represents an ideal candidate tumor suppressor gene for chronic myeloid leukaemia.
