= Congenital insensitivity to pain with anhidrosis =

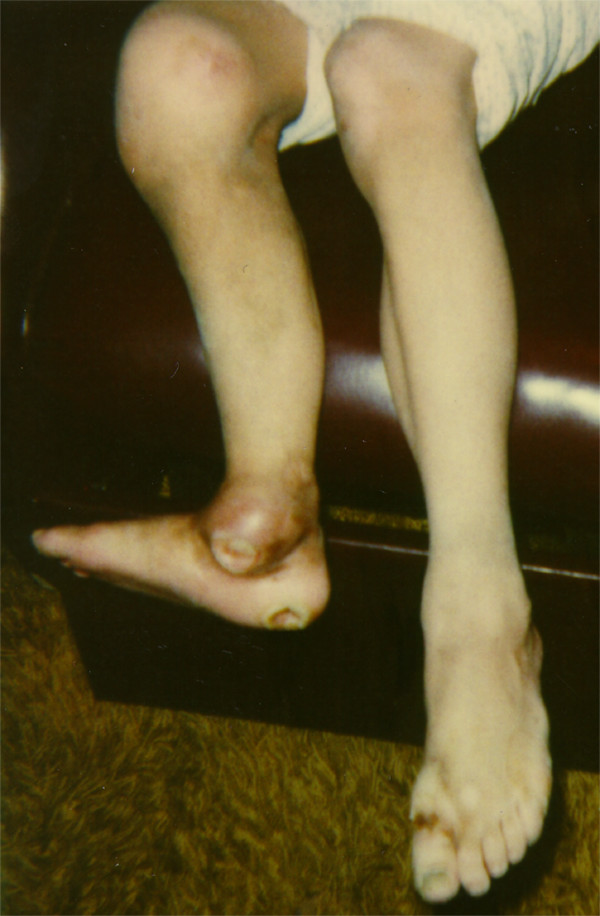
- Charcot joints are shown in this boy with CIPA.
- Causes: Genetic mutations

Congenital insensitivity to pain with anhidrosis (CIPA) is a rare autosomal recessive disorder of the nervous system which prevents the feeling of pain or temperature and prevents a person from sweating. Cognitive disorders are commonly coincidental. CIPA is the fourth type of hereditary sensory and autonomic neuropathy (HSAN), and is also known as HSAN IV.

== Signs and symptoms ==
Signs of CIPA are present from infancy. Infants may present with seizures related to an abnormally high body temperature. Since people with this condition are unable to sweat, they are unable to properly regulate their body temperature. Those affected are unable to feel pain and temperature.

The absence of pain experienced by people with CIPA puts them at high risk for accidental self-injury. Corneal ulceration occurs due to a lack of protective impulses. Joint and bone problems are common due to repeated injuries, and wounds heal poorly.

Delayed developmental milestones in early years may be observed. Patients often have severe learning difficulties, irritability, hyperactivity, self-injurious behaviour, and cognitive impairment, but patients with normal intelligence have also been reported.

== Cause ==
CIPA is caused by a genetic mutation that prevents the formation of nerve cells responsible for transmitting signals of pain, heat, and cold in the brain. The disorder is inherited in an autosomal recessive fashion.

CIPA is caused by a mutation in NTRK1, a gene encoding the neurotrophic tyrosine kinase receptor. NTRK1 is a receptor for nerve growth factor (NGF). This protein induces outgrowth of axons and dendrites and promotes the survival of embryonic sensory and sympathetic neurons. The mutation in NTRK1 does not allow NGF to bind properly, causing defects in the development and function of nociceptive reception.

Mitochondrial abnormalities in muscle cells have been found in people with CIPA. Skin biopsies show a lack of innervation of the eccrine glands and nerve biopsies show a lack of small myelinated and unmyelinated fibers.

== Diagnosis ==
Diagnosis is made based on clinical criteria, supported by nerve biopsy findings of reduced unmyelinated and small myelinated fibers. Physicians may look for a lack of pain response, unexplained injuries, accidental self-mutilation, recurrent fevers, difficulty or inability to sweat, and developmental delays. CIPA can be confirmed with genetic testing of the NTRK1 gene, sweat testing, and quantitative sensory testing. It can also be found prenatally, as there has been a heightened awareness for CIPA's autosomal recessive pattern.

=== Differential diagnosis ===
The absence of or significantly reduced sweating in CIPA patients can be used for a differential diagnosis, which is caused by failed sympathetic neuron development. Often times, these conditions that are present in CIPA can be falsely mistaken. CIPA is classified under the condition of Hereditary Sensory and Autonomic Neuropathy (HSAN IV). This disorder often describes factors like pain insensitivity which have varying degrees of intensity or decline. Without genetic testing, CIPA may be confused with several other levels of HSAN based on the shared similarity of sensitivity loss.Marsili syndrome shows congenital insensitivity to pain with anhidrosis, although have a normal sense of smell and light touch sensation.

== Treatment ==
There is no curative treatment for CIPA. Instead, treatment is focused primarily on injury mitigation, physical therapy, and improvement of quality of life. Patients of CIPA should undergo regular orthopedic and temperature monitoring to assess their physical condition. Patients can also wear physical protective gear to prevent unintended injury, such as knee pads, mouthguards, or gloves. Behavioral therapy can also be employed to train individuals affected by CIPA to avoid situations and habits that can lead to injury. Hiring professionals, such as specially trained nurses, is also a useful resource in injury mitigation. Such medical professionals can aid in the case of injury of the affected individual as well as incorporating precautions in the home that aid in avoiding future injuries. Attention to injuries to prevent infection and worsening is necessary.

=== Anesthetic management ===
Some patients with CIPA have undergone surgery without analgesic anesthesia, though sedation was administered, but the patient's anxiety might still need to be alleviated in these cases. Patients might have tactile hyperesthesia, in which case anesthesia is necessary, since only nociceptors are absent. Patients are also highly susceptible to infection regarding unnoticed injury during the recovery process.This can be life-threatening as these infections can progress in severity under the radar if not attended to timely. Bradycardia, hypotension, and hyperthermia also require management/attention, before, during, and after surgery.

== Epidemiology ==
CIPA is a rare mutation. Worldwide several hundred cases have been reported, with an unknown prevalence. According to a study, congenital insensitivity to pain with anhidrosis occurs in about 1 out of 125 million births. The condition is inherited and is most common among Negev Arabs aka Negev Bedouins. For Japan, the prevalence is estimated at 1/600,000–950,000. As well as a larger population of individuals with CIPA found in Israel due to a founder mutation seen in some regions. Approximately 20% of people with CIPA die of hyperthermia by age 3.
