= Zinc finger homeobox 2 =

Protein-coding gene in the species Homo sapiens

ZFHX2

Identifiers
- Aliases: ZFHX2, ZFH-5, ZNF409, ZFH5, MARSIS, zinc finger homeobox 2
- External IDs: OMIM: 617828; MGI: 2686934; GeneCards: ZFHX2

Gene location (Human)
Chr.	Chromosome 14 (human)
Band	14q11.2	Start	23,520,857 bp
Band	14q11.2	End	23,556,192 bp

Gene location (Mouse)
Chr.	Chromosome 14 (mouse)
Band	14|14 C3	Start	55,297,719 bp
Band	14|14 C3	End	55,329,781 bp
RNA expression pattern
Bgee	Human / Mouse (ortholog); Top expressed in: buccal mucosa cell; sperm; testicle; left testis; right testis; lateral nuclear group of thalamus; sural nerve; right hemisphere of cerebellum; right frontal lobe; primary visual cortex / Top expressed in: superior frontal gyrus; neural layer of retina; primary visual cortex; ventricular zone; genital tubercle; urethra; cerebellar cortex; male urethra; neural tube; dentate gyrus of hippocampal formation granule cell; More reference expression data
BioGPS	n/a
Gene ontology
Molecular function	sequence-specific DNA binding; DNA binding; zinc ion binding; metal ion binding; nucleic acid binding; DNA-binding transcription factor activity, RNA polymerase II-specific; RNA polymerase II cis-regulatory region sequence-specific DNA binding
Cellular component	nucleus
Biological process	adult behavior; regulation of transcription, DNA-templated; transcription, DNA-templated; regulation of transcription by RNA polymerase II; negative regulation of transcription by RNA polymerase II; positive regulation of transcription, DNA-templated; regulation of sensory perception of pain
Sources:Amigo / QuickGO
Orthologs
Databases	NCBI: entry; OMA: entry
Species	Human	Mouse
Entrez	85446	239102
Ensembl	ENSG00000136367	ENSMUSG00000040721
UniProt	Q9C0A1	Q2MHN3
RefSeq (mRNA)	NM_033400	NM_001039198
RefSeq (protein)	NP_207646	NP_001034287
Location (UCSC)	Chr 14: 23.52 – 23.56 Mb	Chr 14: 55.3 – 55.33 Mb
PubMed search
- Wikidata
View/Edit Human	View/Edit Mouse

Zinc finger homeobox 2 is a protein that in humans is encoded by the ZFHX2 gene. It has been implicated in pain insensitivity.
