= Bial =

Pharmaceutical company headquartered in Portugal

Portela e C.ª, S.A.
- Type: Sociedade Anónima
- Industry: Major drugs, health care
- Founded: April 19, 1924
- Headquarters: Trofa, Portugal
- Key people: António Horta Osório, Chairman (Appointed from April, 2021 onwards)
- Products: Pharmaceuticals
- Number of employees: 924 (2018)
- Website: www.bial.com

Bial (Portela e C.ª, S.A.) is a pharmaceutical company headquartered in São Mamede do Coronado, in Trofa, Porto district, Portugal. It was founded in 1924, being among the largest companies of its kind in Portugal. Its products are sold in pharmacies in more than 58 countries on 4 continents: Europe, America, Africa, and Asia.

== Financing ==
On 21 September 2015, the European Investment Bank signed a EUR 45 million financing agreement for Bial's R&D over the next 3 years. It was directed to "discover, develop and provide therapeutic solutions in [...] three major areas of research: central nervous system (CNS), cardiology and allergen immunotherapy". The EIB found Bial not to have the status of a contracting entity, and therefore, Bial has not been subject to EU rules on public procurement.

== Research and products ==
In 2008, Bial completed a clinical evaluation of eslicarbazepine acetate, a drug for the adjunctive use in partial seizures in adults with epilepsy. The Japanese company Eisai gained the sole license to market, promote, and distribute it as Zebinix or Exalief in Europe. In America, it is marketed by Sunovion under the name Aptiom. Its use in epilepsy treatment in children is under development. A clinical trial of eslicarbazepine acetate as therapy in persons with diabetic neuropathic pain was prematurely halted.

Etamicastat (BIA 5–453) is a dopamine-β-hydroxylase inhibitor decreasing norepinephrine levels in peripheral sympathetically innervated tissues, without effect in brain tissues of spontaneously hypertensive rats.

BIA 5-1058 is another reversible dopamine beta-hydroxylase inhibitor that decreases norepinephrine levels in peripheral sympathetically innervated tissues, without CNS effects.

Opicapone (BIA 9-1067), Bial's second pharmaceutical, is a COMT inhibitor for the treatment of Parkinson's disease. It is under review by the European Medicines Agency (EMA).

On 9 September 2015, Bial entered into an agreement with the Helsinn Group for the exclusive distribution and license rights to the Helsinn Group's drug anamorelin in Spain, Portugal, Angola, and Mozambique.

In 2015, Bial commissioned a contract research organization, Biotrial, to run a phase one clinical trial for BIA 10-2474, an FAAH inhibitor that targets the endocannabinoid system. The research in Rennes commenced in July 2015, evaluating male and female subjects aged between 18 and 55 years old receiving a single dose. On 7 January 2016, a trial involving multiple doses was started on six non-placebo subjects. The first patient receiving the multiple doses was hospitalized at Rennes University Hospital on 10 January, leading Biotrial to suspend the study on 11 January. Five patients were hospitalized, with the first one receiving multiple doses and becoming brain-dead.

On June 25, 2024, Bial was awarded the title of Honorary Member of the Military Order of Saint James of the Sword.
