= Rennes University Hospital =

Centre hospitalier universitaire de Rennes
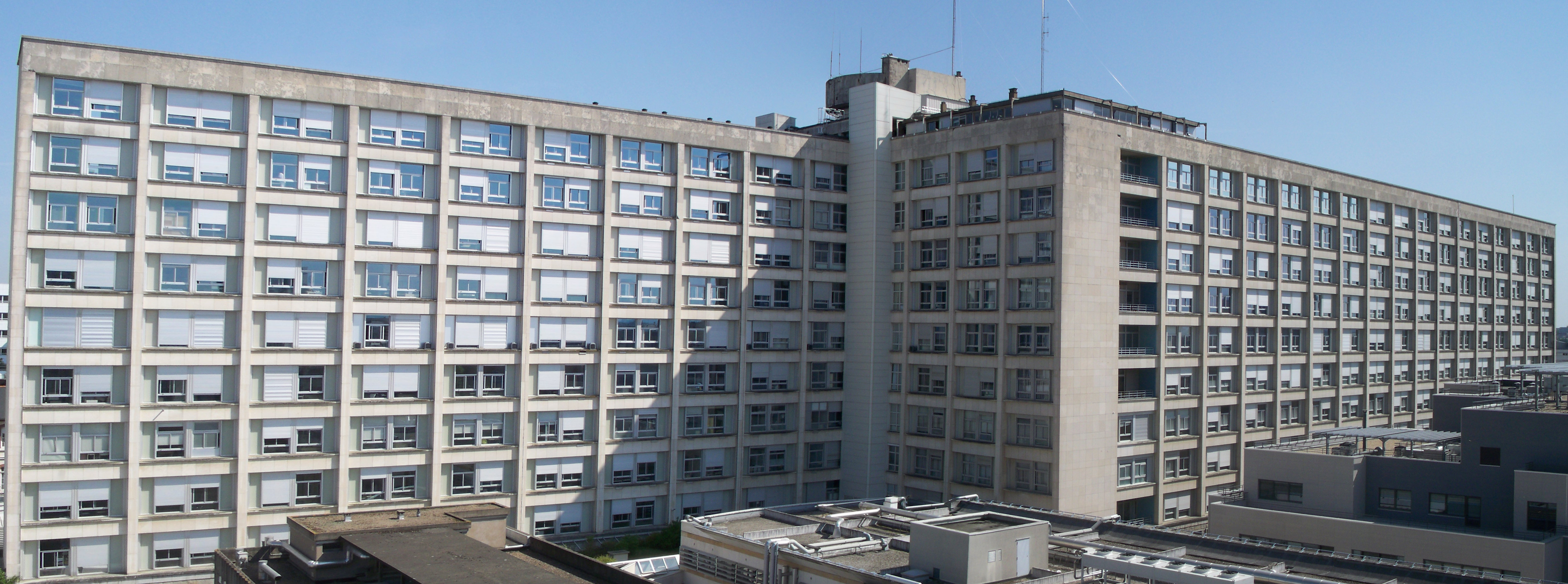
- Main building of the Hospital Pontchaillou

Geography
- Location: Rennes, Brittany, France
- Coordinates: 48.12083°N 1.69637°W

Organisation
- Type: Teaching, CHU

Services
- Emergency department: Yes

Links
- Website: www.chu-rennes.fr
- Lists: Hospitals in France

The Rennes University Hospital (French: Centre hospitalier universitaire de Rennes or CHU Rennes) is a university hospital in Rennes in France. It employs 7,700 people and processes nearly 1,500 hospitalisations per day. It was the second largest employer in the Rennes region. It is one of 42 French hospital equipped with the da Vinci Surgical System.

In 2014, the Rennes University Hospital was ranked in the top 10 hospitals in France.

== Research ==
Research at CHU Rennes has included a study of the efficacy of nalmefene.

In 2016, a facility run by the private contract research organization Biotrial, running clinical trials required patients to be admitted to CHU Rennes. The facility ran a phase one study into a new drug being developed by Bial that targets the human endocannabinoid system. The study failed catastrophically, leaving six subjects hospitalized and one brain dead.

== See also ==
- List of hospitals in France
