= N-Acetyltaurine =

Names
- Preferred IUPAC name 2-Acetamidoethane-1-sulfonic acid
- Other names NAcT

Identifiers
CAS Number	19213-70-8
3D model (JSmol)	Interactive image
ChemSpider	140553
PubChem CID	159864
UNII	UL4H5MX8B7
CompTox Dashboard (EPA)	DTXSID80172779
- InChI: InChI=1S/C4H9NO4S/c1-4(6)5-2-3-10(7,8)9/h2-3H2,1H3,(H,5,6)(H,7,8,9) Key: CXJAAWRLVGAKDV-UHFFFAOYSA-N
- SMILES: CC(=O)NCCS(=O)(=O)O

Properties
Chemical formula	C_{4}H_{9}NO_{4}S
Molar mass	167.18 g·mol^{−1}
Appearance	Solid
Solubility in water	Soluble
- Except where otherwise noted, data are given for materials in their standard state (at 25 °C [77 °F], 100 kPa). Infobox references

N-Acetyltaurine (NAcT) is an endogenous metabolite. Biochemically, N-acetyltaurine is formed as a result of an acetylation of taurine. The main substrate for this reaction is acetate. An increase of endogenous N-acetyltaurine concentrations was observed after the consumption of alcohol and after extended physical activity (ketoacidosis).

== History ==
N-Acetyltaurine was first mentioned in 1990 as a compound in the droplets of the orb spider's viscid spiral. Based on its high hygroscopicity, N-acetyltaurine is an important ingredient which ensures the spider web's flexibility.

As a biomarker for ethanol metabolism, N-acetyltaurine was first mentioned in a mice study in 2012. Another study in 2015 focused on the effect of endurance training on an increase in N-acetyltaurine concentrations. The first study focusing on the forensic context of alcohol biomarker analysis in human urine was published in 2016. One year later, in 2017 an evaluation of N-acetyltaurine as an alcoholmarker in human blood followed.

== Significance as an alcohol marker ==
N-Acetyltaurine is a direct alcohol biomarker which represents the oxidative pathway of ethanol metabolism. Other direct alcohol biomarkers such as fatty acid ethyl esters (FAEE), ethyl glucuronide, ethyl sulfate, and phosphatidylethanol reflect the non-oxidative pathway of alcohol metabolism, based on conjunction reactions (biotransformation).

The fact that N-acetyltaurine is an endogenous metabolite reduces its significance as an alcohol biomarker: A distinction between endogenous N-acetyltaurine concentrations and alcohol induced concentrations is necessary.

During a drinking study with a target blood alcohol concentrations of 0.8 g/kg, an alcohol induced concentration of N-acetyltaurine which was about ten folds higher than the endogenous concentration was observed. In blood the alcohol induced increase was only twofold. Based on these observations, it was concluded that N-acetyltaurine is excreted very efficiently by the kidney.

== Metabolism and function in mammals ==
The mammalian body mass index-associated enzyme phosphotriesterase-related (PTER) is a dedicated N-acetyltaurine amidohydrolase. Global PTER(-/-) mice accumulate N-acetyltaurine systemically. Following taurine supplementation, PTER(-/-) mice exhibit reduced food intake, resistance to diet-induced obesity, and improved glucose homeostasis. Administration of N-acetyltaurine to wild-type obese mice also reduces food intake and body weight in a GFRAL-dependent manner.

== Analytics ==
N-Acetyltaurine can be quantified by a combination of high performance liquid chromatography and mass spectrometry (MS/MS). Due to the high hydrophilicity of N-acetyltaurine, the hydrophilic interaction chromatography (HILIC) is the method of choice in order to separate the analyte from the matrix components.
