= Claude Huriet =

French politician (1930–2024)

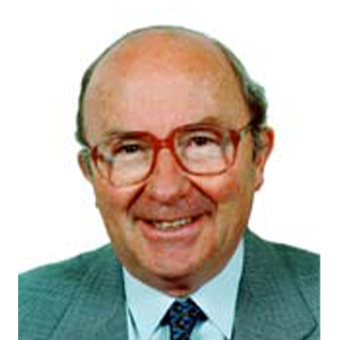

Member of the French Senate for Meurthe-et-Moselle
- In office 1 October 1983 – 30 September 2001

Personal details
- Born: 24 May 1930 Nancy, France
- Died: 27 October 2024 (aged 94) Laxou, France
- Party: UDF
- Education: University of Lorraine
- Profession: Professor of Medicine

Claude Huriet (24 May 1930 – 27 October 2024) was a French politician. He was a senator from 1983 to 2001. Huriet died in Laxou near Nancy on 27 October 2024, at the age of 94.
