= PF-3845 =

Chemical compound

Clinical data
- ATC code: None

Legal status
- Legal status: US: Investigational New Drug

Identifiers
- IUPAC name: N-3-pyridinyl-4-([3-([5-(trifluoromethyl)-2-pyridinyl]oxy)phenyl]methyl)-1-piperidinecarboxamide
- CAS Number: 1196109-52-0
- PubChem CID: 25154867
- ChemSpider: 26232165
- UNII: Q3PW846TYN
- CompTox Dashboard (EPA): DTXSID40648905

Chemical and physical data
- Formula: C_{24}H_{23}F_{3}N_{4}O_{2}
- Molar mass: 456.469 g·mol^{−1}
- 3D model (JSmol): Interactive image
- SMILES: O=C(NC1=CN=CC=C1)N(CC2)CCC2CC3=CC=CC(OC4=NC=C(C(F)(F)F)C=C4)=C3
- InChI: InChI=1S/C24H23F3N4O2/c25-24(26,27)19-6-7-22(29-15-19)33-21-5-1-3-18(14-21)13-17-8-11-31(12-9-17)23(32)30-20-4-2-10-28-16-20/h1-7,10,14-17H,8-9,11-13H2,(H,30,32); Key:NBOJHRYUGLRASX-UHFFFAOYSA-N

PF-3845 is a selective inhibitor of fatty acid amide hydrolase. It results in increased levels of anandamide and results in cannabinoid receptor-based effects. It has anti-inflammatory action in mice colitis models. Antidiarrheal and antinociceptive effects were also seen in mouse models of pain.

A 2017 study published in the Journal of Psychiatry and Neuroscience found that PF-3845 exerts rapid and long-lasting anti-anxiety effects in mice exposed acutely to stress or chronically to the stress hormone corticosterone.
