= EX-597 =

Chemical compound

Clinical data
- Other names: URB597; URB-597; KDS-4103; ORG-231295

Identifiers
- IUPAC name: [3-(3-carbamoylphenyl)phenyl] N-cyclohexylcarbamate
- CAS Number: 546141-08-6
- PubChem CID: 1383884
- IUPHAR/BPS: 4339
- ChemSpider: 1156960
- UNII: PX47LB88FO
- ChEBI: CHEBI:188061
- ChEMBL: ChEMBL184238
- CompTox Dashboard (EPA): DTXSID70203046
- ECHA InfoCard: 100.164.994

Chemical and physical data
- Formula: C_{20}H_{22}N_{2}O_{3}
- Molar mass: 338.407 g·mol^{−1}
- 3D model (JSmol): Interactive image
- SMILES: C1CCC(CC1)NC(=O)OC2=CC=CC(=C2)C3=CC(=CC=C3)C(=O)N
- InChI: InChI=1S/C20H22N2O3/c21-19(23)16-8-4-6-14(12-16)15-7-5-11-18(13-15)25-20(24)22-17-9-2-1-3-10-17/h4-8,11-13,17H,1-3,9-10H2,(H2,21,23)(H,22,24); Key:ROFVXGGUISEHAM-UHFFFAOYSA-N

EX-597 (former developmental code names URB-597, KDS-4103, and ORG-231295) is a fatty acid amide hydrolase inhibitor (FAAH inhibitor) which is under development for the treatment of social anxiety disorder (or social phobia) and post-traumatic stress disorder (PTSD).

It is a relatively selective and irreversible inhibitor of the enzyme fatty acid amide hydrolase (FAAH). FAAH is the primary degradatory enzyme for the endocannabinoid anandamide and, as such, inhibition of FAAH leads to an accumulation of anandamide in the CNS and periphery where it activates cannabinoid receptors. EX-597 has been found to elevate anandamide levels and have activity against neuropathic pain in a mouse model.

Preclinical studies have shown FAAH inhibitors to increase brain-derived neurotrophic factor (BDNF) levels in the hippocampus and prefrontal cortex, highlighting their potential in addiction treatment as "enviromimetics". Indeed, Chauvet et al. found that chronic EX-597 administration in rats "significantly reduces cocaine-seeking behaviour and cue- and stress-induced relapse".

EX-597 was at one point being developed by Kadmus Pharmaceuticals, Inc. for clinical trials in humans.

== Legality ==
EX-597 is legal in the United States. It is not structurally or functionally similar to cannabinoids. However EX-597 may be scheduled in some states such as Florida where it is a Schedule I.

== See also ==
- 4-Nonylphenylboronic acid
- LY-2183240
- PF-04457845
