= LY-2183240 =

Names
- IUPAC name N,N-dimethyl-5-[(4-biphenyl)methyl]tetrazole-1-carboxamide

Identifiers
CAS Number	874902-19-9
3D model (JSmol)	Interactive image
ChEBI	CHEBI:92670
ChemSpider	9682599
ECHA InfoCard	100.189.657
PubChem CID	11507802
UNII	2WBU91OKM7
CompTox Dashboard (EPA)	DTXSID001024706
- InChI: InChI=1S/C17H17N5O/c1-21(2)17(23)22-16(18-19-20-22)12-13-8-10-15(11-9-13)14-6-4-3-5-7-14/h3-11H,12H2,1-2H3 Key: GZNIYOXWFCDBBJ-UHFFFAOYSA-N; InChI=1/C17H17N5O/c1-21(2)17(23)22-16(18-19-20-22)12-13-8-10-15(11-9-13)14-6-4-3-5-7-14/h3-11H,12H2,1-2H3 Key: GZNIYOXWFCDBBJ-UHFFFAOYAF
- SMILES: CN(C)C(=O)n1nnnc1Cc2ccc(cc2)-c3ccccc3

Properties
Chemical formula	C_{17}H_{17}N_{5}O
Molar mass	307.349
- Except where otherwise noted, data are given for materials in their standard state (at 25 °C [77 °F], 100 kPa). Infobox references

LY-2183240 is a drug which acts both as a potent inhibitor of the reuptake of the endocannabinoid anandamide and as an inhibitor of fatty acid amide hydrolase (FAAH), the primary enzyme responsible for degrading anandamide. This leads to markedly elevated anandamide levels in the brain, and LY-2183240 has been shown to produce both analgesic and anxiolytic effects in animal models. While LY-2183240 is a potent inhibitor of FAAH, it has relatively poor selectivity and also inhibits several other enzyme side targets. Consequently, it was never developed for clinical use, though it remains widely used in research, and has also been sold as a designer drug.

== See also ==
- Endocannabinoid reuptake inhibitor
- FAAH inhibitor
  - BIA 10-2474
  - PF-04457845
  - URB-597
