= Fatty-acid amide hydrolase 1 =

Mammalian protein found in humans

FAAH

Identifiers
- Aliases: FAAH, fatty acid amide hydrolase, FAAH-1, PSAB
- External IDs: OMIM: 602935; MGI: 109609; GeneCards: FAAH
Enzyme activity
EC #	BRENDA	ExPASy	KEGG	MetaCyc
3.5.1.99	↗	↗	↗	↗

Gene location (Human)
Chr.	Chromosome 1 (human)
Band	1p33	Start	46,394,317 bp
Band	1p33	End	46,413,848 bp

Gene location (Mouse)
Chr.	Chromosome 4 (mouse)
Band	4 D1|4 53.08 cM	Start	115,824,342 bp
Band	4 D1|4 53.08 cM	End	115,875,123 bp
RNA expression pattern
Bgee	Human / Mouse (ortholog); Top expressed in: right lobe of thyroid gland; left lobe of thyroid gland; mucosa of transverse colon; C1 segment; right hemisphere of cerebellum; left testis; right testis; right lobe of liver; nucleus accumbens; body of pancreas / Top expressed in: dentate gyrus of hippocampal formation granule cell; left lobe of liver; primary visual cortex; CA3 field; perirhinal cortex; superior frontal gyrus; entorhinal cortex; right kidney; gallbladder; hippocampus proper; More reference expression data
BioGPS	n/a
Gene ontology
Molecular function	protein binding; hydrolase activity; acylglycerol lipase activity; fatty acid amide hydrolase activity; amidase activity
Cellular component	cytoplasm; organelle membrane; integral component of membrane; cytoskeleton; endoplasmic reticulum membrane; endomembrane system; membrane
Biological process	arachidonic acid metabolic process; fatty acid catabolic process; monoacylglycerol catabolic process
Sources:Amigo / QuickGO
Orthologs
Databases	NCBI: entry; OMA: entry
Species	Human	Mouse
Entrez	2166	14073
Ensembl	ENSG00000117480	ENSMUSG00000034171
UniProt	O00519	O08914
RefSeq (mRNA)	NM_001441	NM_010173
RefSeq (protein)	NP_001432	NP_034303
Location (UCSC)	Chr 1: 46.39 – 46.41 Mb	Chr 4: 115.82 – 115.88 Mb
PubMed search
- Wikidata
View/Edit Human	View/Edit Mouse

Fatty-acid amide hydrolase 1 (FAAH) is a member of the serine hydrolase family of enzymes. It was first shown to break down anandamide (AEA), an N-acylethanolamine (NAE) in 1993. In humans, it is encoded by the gene FAAH.

== Function ==
FAAH is an integral membrane hydrolase with a single N-terminal transmembrane domain. In vitro, FAAH has esterase and amidase activity. In vivo, FAAH is the principal catabolic enzyme for a class of bioactive lipids called the fatty acid amides (FAAs). Members of the FAAs include:

- Anandamide (N-arachidonoylethanolamine), an endocannabinoid
- 2-arachidonoylglycerol (2-AG), an endocannabinoid.
- Other N-acylethanolamines, such as N-oleoylethanolamine and N-palmitoylethanolamine
- The sleep-inducing lipid oleamide
- The N-acyltaurines, which are agonists of the transient receptor potential (TRP) family of calcium channels.

FAAH knockout mice display highly elevated (>15-fold) levels of N-acylethanolamines and N-acyltaurines in various tissues. Because of their significantly elevated anandamide levels, FAAH KOs have an analgesic phenotype, showing reduced pain sensation in the hot plate test, the formalin test, and the tail flick test. Finally, because of their impaired ability to degrade anandamide, FAAH KOs also display supersensitivity to exogenous anandamide, a cannabinoid receptor (CB) agonist. (Humans have two fatty-acid amide hydrolase genes, the other being FAAH2, while rodents only have FAAH. This is likely to complicate translations between human and rodent biology.)

Due to the ability of FAAH to regulate nociception, it is currently viewed as an attractive drug target for the treatment of pain.

Studies in cells and animals and genetic studies in humans have shown that inhibiting FAAH may be a useful strategy to treat anxiety disorders, as inhibition produce analgesic, anxiolytic, neuroprotective, and anti-inflammatory effects by elevated N-acylethanolamines (NAE's) and their activation of cannabinoid receptors.

== Inhibitors ==
Activation of the cannabinoid receptor CB1 or CB2 in different tissues, including skin, inhibit FAAH, and thereby increases endocannabinoid levels.

Based on the hydrolytic mechanism of fatty acid amide hydrolase, a large number of irreversible and reversible inhibitors of this enzyme have been developed.

Some of the more significant compounds are listed below;

- AM374, palmitylsulfonyl fluoride, one of the first FAAH inhibitors developed for in vitro use, but too reactive for research in vivo
- ARN2508, derivative of flurbiprofen, dual FAAH / COX inhibitor
- BIA 10-2474 (Bial-Portela & Ca. SA, Portugal) has been linked to severe adverse events affecting 5 patients in a drug trial in Rennes, France, and at least one death, in January 2016. Many other pharmaceutical companies have previously taken other FAAH inhibitors into clinical trials without reporting such adverse events.
- BMS-469908
- CAY-10402
- Irafamdastat (BMS-986368; CC-97489) – dual FAAH and MAGL inhibitor
- JNJ-245
- JNJ-1661010
- JNJ-28833155
- JNJ-40413269
- JNJ-42119779
- JNJ-42165279 in clinical trials against social anxiety and depression, trials suspended as a precautionary measure following serious adverse event with BIA 10-2474
- LY-2183240
- Cannabidiol
- MK-3168
- MK-4409
- MM-433593
- OL-92
- OL-135
- PF-622
- PF-750
- PF-3845
- PF-04862853
- Redafamdastat (JZP-150; PF-04457845) – "exquisitely selective" for FAAH over other serine hydrolases, but failed in clinical trials against osteoarthritis
- RN-450
- SA-47
- SA-73
- SSR-411298 well tolerated in clinical trials but insufficient efficacy against depression, subsequently trialled against cancer pain as an adjunctive treatment.
- ST-4068, reversible inhibitor of FAAH
- TK-25
- URB524
- URB597 (KDS-4103, Kadmus Pharmaceuticals), is an irreversible inactivator with a carbamate-based mechanism, and appears in one report as a somewhat selective, though it also inactivates other serine hydrolases (e.g., carboxylesterases) in peripheral tissues.
- URB694
- URB937
- VER-156084 (Vernalis)
- V-158866 (Vernalis) in clinical trials for neuropathic pain following spinal injury, and spasticity associated with multiple sclerosis. Structure not revealed though Vernalis holds several patents in the area.

=== Inhibition and binding ===
Structural and conformational properties that contribute to enzyme inhibition and substrate binding imply an extended bound conformation, and a role for the presence, position, and stereochemistry of a delta cis double bond.

== Enhancement of FAAH activity ==
Insulin medication increases the production and activity of FAAH.

== Genetic variants ==
=== rs324420 ===
SNP: rs324420
- Name(s): C385A, c.385C>A, p.Pro129Thr
- Gene: FAAH
- Chromosome: 1
- Region: Exon

External databases
- Ensembl: Human SNPView
- dbSNP: 324420
- HapMap: 324420
- SNPedia: 324420

The FAAH gene contains a single nucleotide polymorphism (SNP) called rs324420. The variant allele, C385A, is associated with a higher sensitivity of FAAH to proteolytic degradation and a shorter half-life compared to the standard C variant. As a result, carriers of the A variant has increased N-acylethanolamine (NAE) levels and anandamide (AEA) signaling at the cannabinoid receptors. The A variant may be responsible for lower levels of the FAAH protein seen in high-performing athletes, providing increased physical and mental fitness. However, among elite Polish athletes, the A variant is under-represented regardless of metabolic characteristics of their sport disciplines; this seems to suggest an opposite role for the A variant.

A 2017 study found a strong correlation between national percentage of very happy people (as measured by the World Values Survey) and the presence of the rs324420 C385A allele in citizens' genetic make-up.

The C385A allele was initially provisionally linked to drug abuse and dependence but this was not borne out in subsequent studies. According to later studies, carriers of the A allele are more likely to try cannabis, but less likely to become dependent.

=== FAAH-OUT microdeletion ===
FAAH-OUT is a pseudogene downstream of the FAAH coding region. It expresses a long non-coding RNA (lncRNA) that increases the expression of FAAH. In 2019, a Scottish woman named Jo Cameron was found to have both a previously unreported microdeletion mutation in FAAH-OUT and a rs324420 C385A mutation. The result is extreme disruption of FAAH function leading to elevated anandamide levels. She was immune to anxiety, unable to experience fear, and insensitive to pain. The frequent burns and cuts suffered due to her hypoalgesia healed quicker than average with little or no scarring. Her son, who shares the FAAH-OUT deletion but has no C385A mutation, has a lesser degree of pain insensitivity.

A 2023 study looks further into the functions of FAAH-OUT using transcriptomic analyses of cell models, some created anew using CRISPR-Cas9, others obtained from the 2019 patient. The study confirms that FAAH-OUT increases the expression of FAAH, both via its lncRNA product and through an intronic enhancer called FAAH-AMP. Loss of FAAH-OUT also changes the expression of a wide network of genes beyond FAAH itself. For example, although the pain insensitivity is mostly due to loss of FAAH function (via increased endocannabinoid levels and reduced ACKR3 expression), lack of depression and anxiety is instead due to a non-canonical Wnt pathway upregulating BDNF. The increased wound healing is due to both pathways: loss of FAAH function increases N-acyltaurine levels; the non-canonical Wnt pathway is also beneficial to healing.

== Assays ==
The enzyme is typically assayed making use of a radiolabelled anandamide substrate, which generates free labelled ethanolamine, although alternative LC-MS methods have also been described.

== Structures ==
The first crystal structure of FAAH was published in 2002 (PDB code 1MT5). Structures of FAAH with drug-like ligands were first reported in 2008, and include non-covalent inhibitor complexes and covalent adducts.

== Regulation ==
=== In slime molds ===
The slime mold Dictyostelium discoideum produces a semispecific FAAH inhibitor. By controlling the levels of FAAH activity, they modulate endogenous N-acylethanolamine levels.

== Enzyme classification ==
In the Enzyme Commission numbering scheme, "fatty acid amide hydrolase" is EC 3.5.1.99. The number applies to all enzymes that have the chemical activity; in humans it covers both the genes FAAH and FAAH2. The systematic name is "fatty acylamide amidohydrolase". Recorded synonyms include "oleamide hydrolase", "anandamide amidohydrolase".

== See also ==
- Endocannabinoid enhancer
- Endocannabinoid reuptake inhibitor
- Monoacylglycerol lipase
