= List of Elementary episodes =

Elementary is an American crime drama created by Robert Doherty and loosely based on Sherlock Holmes and other characters appearing in the works of Sir Arthur Conan Doyle. The series stars Jonny Lee Miller, Lucy Liu, Aidan Quinn, and Jon Michael Hill and premiered on CBS on September 27, 2012. On December 17, 2018, it was announced that the series would end after the seventh season.

During the course of the series, 154 episodes of Elementary aired over seven seasons, between September 27, 2012, and August 15, 2019.

== Series overview ==
Season	Episodes	Originally released	
Season	Episodes	First released	Last released
1	24	September 27, 2012	May 16, 2013
2	24	September 26, 2013	May 15, 2014
3	24	October 30, 2014	May 14, 2015
4	24	November 5, 2015	May 8, 2016
5	24	October 2, 2016	May 21, 2017
6	21	April 30, 2018	September 17, 2018
7	13	May 23, 2019	August 15, 2019

== Episodes ==
=== Season 1 (2012–13) ===
No. overall	No. in season	Title	Directed by	Written by	Original release date	U.S. viewers (millions)
1	1	"Pilot"	Michael Cuesta	Robert Doherty	September 27, 2012	13.41
Joan Watson is hired by Morland Holmes to be the sober companion of his recovering addict son Sherlock, who used to work for Scotland Yard as a consultant on homicides. The day of his release, Sherlock escapes from rehab to help Captain Gregson with the case of a woman who was attacked and supposedly kidnapped, only to find her body in a concealed safe room. Sherlock believes that the killer is probably a serial killer, finding similarities to another case, except that this victim survived. After interviewing the woman, Sherlock deduces she knows the man who attacked her. The suspect, however, is dead, seemingly a suicide. Sherlock concludes that the second victim's psychiatrist husband gave his patient, the killer, steroids that made him violent, rather than pills to calm him down, then arranged for him to come into contact with the psychiatrist's wife. He persuaded his spouse to have plastic surgery to make her look like the first victim, on whom the killer had a violent obsession. The psychiatrist was planning on leaving his wealthy wife, but there was a prenuptial agreement that would have left him nothing, unless she were to die.
2	2	"While You Were Sleeping"	John David Coles	Robert Doherty	October 4, 2012	11.13
Sherlock and Joan investigate two murders. Sherlock notices that both victims had corneal dystrophy, a rare genetic disorder, which suggests they are related. They discover that they were the illegitimate offspring of a wealthy deceased businessman. His large fortune is to be disbursed to his fraternal twin daughters within days. A witness provides a description of the murderer that matches a woman in a coma—one of the twins. Eventually, Sherlock figures out the comatose woman is working with her doctor, who (having put her in a coma in the first place) can bring her out of it to commit the murders to avoid sharing the inheritance. Sherlock announces in the woman's hospital room that he has identified a third heir and blurts out an address. The killer breaks in, but it is a trap, and she is arrested. Sherlock is also introduced to, and begins working with, NYPD Detective Marcus Bell.
3	3	"Child Predator"	Rod Holcomb	Peter Blake	October 18, 2012	10.91
Sherlock and Joan investigate the abduction of a young girl by a serial killer known as "the Balloon Man", whose name comes from the fact that balloons are left at the scene of each of his abductions. The Balloon Man targets children. Matters get complicated when the Balloon Man's first victim from 2005, Adam Kemper, (Note: Johnny Simmons as Adam Kemper) is caught by the police. Sherlock deduces that Adam has Stockholm syndrome and sympathizes with him to help find the killer. Adam gets an immunity deal for crimes he committed in consort with the Balloon Man. The Balloon Man is identified as Samuel Abbott, but when the police come for him, Abbott commits suicide. His most recent abductee is saved. However, when Sherlock examines Abbott's home, he finds evidence that Adam is, in fact, the Balloon Man. After Abbott kidnapped him, he managed to turn the tables and dominate Abbott. Sherlock finds a way to bring Adam to justice. One of the murders had to have been committed by Adam alone, because Abbott was in the hospital at the time.
4	4	"Rat Race"	Rosemary Rodriguez	Craig Sweeny	October 25, 2012	10.31
Sherlock and Joan are hired to find a missing investment firm executive, who turns up dead of a heroin overdose that is not accidental. After identifying other victims, he suspects a serial killer is murdering their way up the company's ranks. The man who hired Sherlock is the prime suspect; he worked at the branches where and when the others were killed. However, he has an ironclad alibi for one murder. However, the man's secretary also benefitted from her employer's rise. Sherlock tells her this and follows her into an underground garage; she tases Sherlock and drives him to her employer's country home, where she plans to bury his corpse and frame her boss. Joan is forced to tell Gregson the truth about her job with Sherlock to get Gregson to search for him. After receiving a suspicious text message from Sherlock, she realizes that he is in danger. He is located through his cellphone and rescued. Meanwhile, Joan gets roped into a blind date by her friend. She likes the man, but thinks he hesitated when asked if he was ever married so she is suspicious. Sherlock reassures Joan to confirm her feelings he does a computer search to find that he is married.
5	5	"Lesser Evils"	Colin Bucksey	Liz Friedman	November 1, 2012	10.49
While doing research in the hospital morgue, Sherlock stumbles upon a murder that no one else noticed. Someone with medical knowledge is poisoning pain-racked, near-death patients with epinephrine and making it look like they died of natural causes. He murdered eight others. The killer becomes acquainted with his victims; one of them spoke only Ukrainian. None of the doctors do, but a janitor was a doctor in Ukraine. The man is arrested and confesses to everything, but Sherlock is bothered by the fact that one of his victims was recovering. It turns out that her surgeon tampered with her medical file to make it look like she was dying. While operating on her, the surgeon left a surgical clamp inside her; because of his prior blunders, he would have been fired and in danger of losing his license if this mistake was known. Meanwhile, Joan reconnects with a doctor friend. While sitting in on a pre-op procedure, her gut instinct tells her that the patient has a condition that might kill her during surgery. Joan discovers she may be "a better doctor than she is a friend" after ordering a second, more accurate test (which confirms her suspicion) without her friend's approval.
6	6	"Flight Risk"	David Platt	Corinne Brinkerhoff	November 8, 2012	10.90
A small plane crashed on a beach, killing all four aboard. Sherlock deduces that one of them was murdered beforehand by the lack of bleeding. Sand was put into the fuel tank to disable the plane's engine, and the murder victim walked in on the perpetrator at work. His corpse was then stuffed in the cargo hold, which caused a weight imbalance and the subsequent premature crash, on land instead of water. Evidence points to another pilot at the same company who is smuggling cocaine, but the real murderer is the company's owner, who is also involved in the smuggling. Joan is invited to dinner by Sherlock's father. However, Sherlock warns her his father will not show up, based on his own experience. Joan meets a man claiming to be Sherlock's father, but realizes he is an impostor when he asks her how sex is with Sherlock. She later tracks down Alistair Moore, (Note: Roger Rees as Alistair Moore) an actor and friend of Sherlock named Alistair, to learn more about Sherlock's past, as Sherlock refuses to divulge anything. Alistair knows little, but Sherlock once visited him while high, barely able to speak, and muttered the name Irene. Joan asks Sherlock about her.
7	7	"One Way to Get Off"	Seith Mann	Christopher Silber	November 15, 2012	10.75
Sherlock assists Gregson with a double homicide investigation that has the same modus operandi as a series of murders from 13 years earlier. That case led to the conviction of Wade Crewes, who is still in jail, and gave Gregson his big break. While Gregson looks for a copycat killer, Sherlock digs into the old case. He discovers that either Gregson or his then partner planted a mug with Crewes' fingerprints at a crime scene, which proved vital in obtaining Crewes' conviction. Sherlock questions whether Crewes is guilty after all. Crewes had no visitors during his incarceration, so an accomplice seems impossible, that is until Sherlock realizes a prison library worker named Sean Figuero taught the illiterate Crewes to read. Sean turns out to be Crewes' illegitimate son and his accomplice. After being frozen out by Sherlock, Joan pays a visit to his old rehab center in order to learn more about the enigmatic man now in her care.
8	8	"The Long Fuse"	Andrew Bernstein	Jeffrey Paul King	November 29, 2012	10.46
A bomb explodes in the office of a website design company, killing two and injuring eleven. The first suspect is someone who called a pager that triggered the bomb, but he just misdialed the number. The bomb is four years old, leading to investigation of the company that occupied the premises at that time. That turns out to be a high-powered public relations company. It received threatening letters from the ELM, an eco-terrorist group which bombed other companies, in 2008. However, this bomb did not use eco-friendly compounds, unlike the explosives the ELM used. The bomb was planted in a wall of the office of Pradeep Singh, a high-performing executive who went missing that year. Sherlock finds Singh's corpse hidden behind a wall of his house. Singh taped his encounters with prostitutes, one of them being the public relations company CEO Heather Vanowen. (Note: Lisa Edelstein as Heather Vanowen) Vanowen financed her education and the startup of her company through prostitution. Singh was blackmailing her. When the bomb failed to go off, she shot him. Joan encourages Sherlock to choose a sponsor before she leaves.
9	9	"You Do It to Yourself"	Phil Abraham	Peter Blake	December 6, 2012	10.31
An under-the-weather Sherlock investigates the murder of a college professor who was shot in both eyes. Sherlock retraces the victim's steps back to the illicit gambling parlor in Chinatown where he was killed. Gregson is able to bring in the gunman thanks to video surveillance footage, but the killer claims that he was anonymously hired to kill the professor. Evidence points to the professor's teaching assistant, but Sherlock and Joan hypothesize that the victim himself hired his own executioner. It turns out the professor had an agonizingly painful, untreatable cancer and had only a few months to live; his condition could have been detected by the appearance of his eyes. The professor had lured a Chinese woman to the United States, promising to marry her, but instead abused her physically and psychologically. The killer, by changing the location of the killing, messed up the victim's plan to frame her lover (his teaching assistant) for the murder. Meanwhile, Joan gets a call from an addict and former lover who is in prison and needs her help.
10	10	"The Leviathan"	Peter Werner	Corinne Brinkerhoff and Craig Sweeny	December 13, 2012	10.46
When a supposedly uncrackable bank vault called the "Leviathan" is breached for the second time, Sherlock is called in to figure out what went wrong. The first time, the heist was committed by a once-in-a-lifetime teaming of four world-class criminals. They were all caught and imprisoned, so the vault company cannot imagine how anyone else got in. Sherlock learns that not even he can break into the Leviathan. He later surmises that four jurors at the trial of one of the robbers realized that the testimony they had heard was enough for them to recreate the safecracking method used. However, one of them is murdering the others to avoid sharing the $40 million they got away with.
11	11	"Dirty Laundry"	John David Coles	Liz Friedman and Christopher Silber	January 3, 2013	11.44
Sherlock and Joan investigate the murder of Teri Purcell, the general manager of a high-end Manhattan hotel, whose body was stuffed into one of the hotel's industrial driers. The woman's background and family seem clean, but a call girl reveals that the victim secretly helped her and her cohorts to ply their trade at the hotel, and at no charge. Teri used the prostitutes to attract high-level diplomats and businessmen to her establishment, where she videotaped them to obtain valuable information. Sherlock discovers Teri was a Russian spy, as is her husband. Teri revealed all this to their daughter Carly, as well as her plans to make the teen a spy too. Carly objected and pushed her mother, causing her to fall and strike her head on a desk, apparently killing her. Teri's handler, Geoffrey Silver disposed of the body and blackmailed Carly into agreeing to become a spy. Teri, however, was not dead. Silver decided that Carly had much greater potential for espionage and killed Teri. Meanwhile, since Joan's time with Sherlock is almost up, he offers her an apprenticeship, but she has already lined up a new client.
12	12	"M."	John Polson	Robert Doherty	January 10, 2013	11.48
Sherlock is reunited with British serial killer "M" (Note: Vinnie Jones as Sebastian Moran) who appears to have followed him to New York; Joan eventually learns that "M" is the one who murdered Sherlock's lover Irene Adler, causing him to spiral into his previous drug addiction. However, after Sherlock captures "M" and privately interrogates him, he learns that "M" (whose name is Sebastian Moran) is not a serial killer, but an assassin, and that he was in prison when Irene was murdered. Moran is on the payroll of a mysterious criminal named Moriarty, who heads a shadowy criminal organization; Moriarty killed Irene and pinned the blame on Moran. Sherlock vows that he will hunt down Moriarty. Meanwhile, Joan has reservations about leaving Sherlock.
13	13	"The Red Team"	Christine Moore	S : Craig Sweeny; S/T : Jeffrey Paul King	January 31, 2013	10.90
After getting suspended by Gregson at the end of the episode "M.", Sherlock decides to spend some time pursuing one of his favorite activities: riling up conspiracy theorists on the Internet. When one of the theorists goes missing, Sherlock decides to investigate on his own. After finding that the man was killed in a suspicious hit-and-run accident, Sherlock looks into the victim's conspiracy theories in order to see if he had hit on anything that might have made him a target. While most of the theories are nonsense, Sherlock does find one that seems possible. In 2009, a group of people were hired by the government to devise a terror plot for a war game simulation. In all other cases, these simulated attacks were stymied and thus made public after the fact, but the 2009 exercise was kept classified. Now, members of the 2009 "Red Team" have started to show up dead or mentally incapacitated, targeted by one member who wants to keep the details of the highly successful simulated attack a secret.
14	14	"The Deductionist"	John Polson	Craig Sweeny and Robert Doherty	February 3, 2013	20.80
While getting prepped in a hospital for a kidney donation to his ill sister, serial murderer Howard Ennis (Note: Terry Kinney as Howard Ennis) escapes from custody and resumes killing. Sherlock is brought in to consult, but bristles after learning that he must work alongside Kathryn Drummond, an FBI profiler who wrote a book about Ennis. She and Sherlock have a past, but their association ended when she published an article profiling Sherlock (called "the deductionist" in the article to protect his identity) that predicted his forthcoming addiction. Meanwhile, Ennis is killing atypically. The experts are stumped until Sherlock realizes that Ennis is out to avenge himself on Drummond because the publicity from her false accusation that his father abused him devastated his family and led to the father's suicide. Ennis's sister is working with him. She stabs Drummond when the latter comes to apologize for her unsubstantiated claims; Drummond survives. Meanwhile, Joan faces eviction from her rent-controlled apartment when she learns that the man she sublet it to used the place to shoot pornographic films, but Watson's deductive skills make her realize that she has been set up by him.
15	15	"A Giant Gun, Filled with Drugs"	Guy Ferland	S : Christopher Silber; T : Corinne Brinkerhoff and Liz Friedman	February 7, 2013	10.84
Sherlock assists his old friend Rhys Kinlan (Note: John Hannah as Rhys Kinlan) after Emily, the latter's adult daughter, is abducted. The kidnapper wants $2.2 million, the exact amount Rhys stole from the Dominican drug cartel he worked for. Rhys, however, squandered it all within 18 months. Joan becomes worried when she learns that Rhys used to be Sherlock's drug dealer. When Rhys begins to get desperate, he offers Sherlock drugs, believing he works better when he is high. When Sherlock checks out the cartel, he identifies one of its members, Xande Diaz, (Note: Michael Irby as Xande Diaz) as an undercover DEA agent. Diaz, however, informs him that the cartel is too busy with more urgent matters to be involved. With the deadline approaching, Sherlock borrows the money from his father, in return for future favors. As Sherlock goes to the rendezvous, he spots three cartel men. He flees, then realizes the only one who could have set him up is Diaz. Diaz takes Rhys and Joan captive, but then finds that only Sherlock can transfer the money to him. Rhys manages to free himself and charges Diaz; while the two men are entangled, Joan knocks Diaz out with a bust.
16	16	"Details"	Sanaa Hamri	S : Robert Doherty; T : Jeffrey Paul King and Jason Tracey	February 14, 2013	10.98
While driving home after a long day, Bell is shot at, and his car overturns. He is not able to get a good look at the shooter, but he recognizes the car as belonging to a recently released drug lord who had vowed to get revenge for Bell's involvement in the man's conviction. Then the criminal turns up dead, and all the evidence points to Bell. Sherlock finds the murder weapon, planted in Bell's apartment. Marcus also struggles to reconnect with his brother Andre, (Note: Malcolm Goodwin as Andre Bell) an ex-convict on parole who wants to use his underworld connections in order to help. Andre ends up with two bullets in his back, but survives. Sherlock finally realizes that it is not one of Bell's known enemies, but rather a colleague and former girlfriend who is after him. The career of Officer Paula Reyes (Note: Paula Garcés as Officer Paula Reyes) was derailed after Bell tipped off the department about a dirty cop whom she admired (and possibly abetted). Sherlock encourages Joan to learn self-defense. He reveals that he knows she is no longer being paid by his father to be his sober companion. He offers to let her stay on as his partner, and she accepts.
17	17	"Possibility Two"	Seith Mann	Mark Goffman	February 21, 2013	11.19
While helping Joan learn deductive skills, Sherlock is approached by Gerald Lydon, a wealthy man suffering from an incurable disease that is destroying his mind. The disease is genetic. However, there is no family history of the disease, so Lydon is certain that someone gave it to him somehow. Unconvinced, Sherlock refuses the case. After Lydon kills his driver, however, Sherlock takes the case and learns that Lydon's claim is theoretically possible. He receives an email from Dr. Natasha Kademan providing details of how it was done, but before they can meet, she turns up dead. All the evidence, including DNA results from blood found at the crime scene, point to the killer being an ex-con with no connection to Sherlock's case. However, the blood was actually manufactured to pass the DNA test. The killer turns out to be Kademan's husband, who mistakenly believed that she was having an affair with someone named Lincoln Dunwoody. The wealthy Lincoln and Dunwoody families each established a foundation to conduct research on Lydon's disease because a member of each family contracted the disease. A scientist suffering from the disease poisoned all three wealthy individuals to obtain funding for research for a cure.
18	18	"Déjà Vu All Over Again"	Jerry Levine	Brian Rodenbeck	March 14, 2013	11.33
Sherlock and Joan are handed a case of a woman who disappeared six months before. She had left behind only a video announcing that she was leaving her husband and reflecting on how her life was affected by the news of a woman who was given a bouquet and then shoved into the path of a subway train by a complete stranger. Sherlock thinks this case is ideal for Joan's first solo investigation. Meanwhile, he investigates the subway murder. Joan questions the husband of the disappeared woman; her instincts tell her he murdered his wife. Joan follows the husband and when she sees him load a large wooden trunk (which he claimed his wife took with her) into his car, breaks into it, but there is nothing inside it and Joan is arrested. After this failure and remarks from her friends, Joan starts doubting her decision to become a detective, but later she finds evidence that links both cases. Sherlock deduces the wife's video was made 18 months before, when another woman was killed in a subway. The husband had recreated the crime so he could claim the video had been sent six months before.
19	19	"Snow Angels"	Andrew Bernstein	Jason Tracey	April 4, 2013	10.48
A security guard is killed during a robbery of unreleased mobile phones, but shoots one of the criminals before dying. The robbery turns out to be a smokescreen to steal blueprints. Sherlock and Joan head to New Jersey to prevent the East Rutherford Operations Center (EROC) from being burglarized during a snowstorm; the city is locked down, with roadblocks to aid emergency responders. Sherlock pays Pam (Note: Becky Ann Baker as Pam) to drive the pair to EROC in her snowplow. Sherlock realizes that the burglary has already taken place - $30 million in used notes about to be shredded - and the loot removed by ambulance. NYPD inquiries at hospitals put the shot criminal into custody, but she refuses to reveal the whereabouts of the loot-filled ambulance. An escape route out of the city for the ambulance was plotted, with roadblocks being removed one by one. The visiting FEMA official helping out with the city's emergency response to the snowstorm is involved in the heist. The remaining two robbers are apprehended. Meanwhile, Ms. Hudson, (Note: Candis Cayne as Ms. Hudson) an old friend of Sherlock's, is dealing with a breakup, so he lets her stay at the brownstone. She is eventually hired to clean there once a week.
20	20	"Dead Man's Switch"	Larry Teng	T : Liz Friedman; S/T : Christopher Silber	April 25, 2013	10.07
Sherlock's first anniversary of being sober is approaching, but he does not want to celebrate the event. Meanwhile, a blackmailer (Note: Based on the villain in the Sir Arthur Conan Doyle story The Adventure of Charles Augustus Milverton.) targets the fathers of three rape victims and even the rapist - the blackmailer warns that a "fail-safe" accomplice will put the videos online in the event of his arrest or demise. Sherlock identifies a man named Milverton as the blackmailer. While breaking into the man's house, Sherlock witnesses Milverton being killed by a masked intruder, who then removes Milverton's body and laptop. Milverton has a blackmail ledger which lists payments to "Henry 8". Pistone, one of the blackmailed fathers, is arrested trying to dispose of Milverton's body. He confesses, but will likely receive a short sentence due to the circumstances. Sherlock finds "Henry 8", murdered nearly a week before. Pistone found Milverton, but the blackmailer offered him a share of the proceeds. Besides, Pistone did not get along with his stepdaughter, the victim. Milverton killed "Henry 8", not needing two accomplices. Pistone then killed Milverton and stole the laptop containing the blackmail material to take over the operation. Sherlock reveals that he is reluctant to celebrate his "sober-versary" because he does not want to be reminded of his last relapse.
21	21	"A Landmark Story"	Peter Werner	Corinne Brinkerhoff	May 2, 2013	9.75
City councilman Van Der Hoff is forced to change his vote online, then murdered through his hacked pacemaker by serial killer Daniel Gottlieb. (Note: F. Murray Abraham as Daniel Gottlieb) Everyone assumes he died of a routine heart attack. Sebastian Moran offers to confess to other murders, but only to Sherlock. Eager to get back at Moriarty for betraying and continuing to try to murder him, Moran tells the detective that Van Der Hoff was one of his assigned targets. Sherlock steals Van Der Hoff's body and determines that Moran's claim is true. Sherlock looks into other well-disguised murders and catches Gottlieb. With Gottlieb's help, Sherlock finds the man who hired him has seen Moriarty, but when he goes to confront him, that man is murdered. Moran commits suicide after Moriarty sends him a coded message (via an unsuspecting Sherlock) giving him the choice between his own death and his sister's. Moriarty calls Sherlock to say he is ready to meet him.
22	22	"Risk Management"	Adam Davidson	S : Robert Doherty; S/T : Liz Friedman	May 9, 2013	9.29
Moriarty calls Sherlock to have him look into the several-month-old unsolved murder of a mechanic; in exchange, he offers to give answers about Irene Adler's death. The mechanic was under surveillance by a private security firm whose founder's sister was killed before. After Sherlock tells the founder, Daren Sutter, that he knows Sutter avenged his sister and that someone bugged his home, Sutter confesses to the mechanic's murder. Moriarty, however, says that Sherlock has not uncovered the whole truth. Sutter did not see his sister's murderer's face as he fled. His wife (who was married to someone else at the time) did, but she could not come forward, as it would reveal her affair with Daren. When her husband's mental health began failing as the 20th anniversary of the murder approached, she convinced him that the lookalike mechanic was the murderer. It worked; Daren was at peace with himself. However, the mechanic was out of the country at the time of the sister's death. Mrs Sutter is arrested. In payment, Sherlock receives an address and the choice to either lead a safe life or find out about Irene. At the address, Sherlock and Joan discover Irene, (Note: Natalie Dormer as Irene Adler) seemingly traumatized.
23	23	"The Woman"	Seith Mann	Robert Doherty and Craig Sweeny	May 16, 2013	8.98
Flashbacks reveal Sherlock's meeting with Irene two years ago and their subsequent relationship, including her "preserving" antique works of art by returning to museums her forgeries of the paintings rather than the restored originals. Irene was psychologically tortured for the past 18 months, which she believes to have been seven years. Sherlock decides to send Irene away to keep her safe, but she counters that they go together. He agrees, but then notices a mole is missing from Irene's back and concludes it was removed to avoid it turning cancerous - which Moriarty would not care about, unless she was working for Moriarty. Berating him for not trusting her, Irene storms out. One of Moriarty's agents discovers he is to be killed, but defeats his would-be assassins and tries to kill Sherlock (in defiance of Moriarty's strict orders). The agent wounds Sherlock and reveals that Moriarty is a woman. The agent is shot and killed by Irene, who now speaks with a British accent. Sherlock then realizes that she is Moriarty.
24	24	"Heroine"	John Polson	Robert Doherty and Craig Sweeny	May 16, 2013	8.98
Moriarty reveals that she faked her murder to distract Sherlock from interfering with her plans, though she did not anticipate his drug overdose. She asks him to let her win and then he can have the United States all to himself. Sherlock uncovers her plan to have the father (Arnold Vosloo) of a woman she kidnapped, in addition to smuggling in two lemurs, murder a family associated with the Macedonian naming dispute to make $1 billion trading in currency. He fails to stop the murders after the family's security officer betrays them, and vents his rage against Joan and Gregson. Sherlock purchases drugs and injects himself in the bathroom of the brownstone, where Bell finds him. Moriarty visits him in the hospital, confessing to her part in the murder. She invites him to leave the country with her, where she will help him overcome his addiction. Sherlock reveals that Joan analyzed Moriarty's behavior and concluded that she was in love with Sherlock and thus would return to him; they relied on Moriarty's agents to witness his wild behavior and let her think that she won. The overdose was faked and Moriarty is arrested, Sherlock having recorded their conversation.

=== Season 2 (2013–14) ===
No. overall	No. in season	Title	Directed by	Written by	Original release date	U.S. viewers (millions)
25	1	"Step Nine"	John Polson	Robert Doherty and Craig Sweeny	September 26, 2013	10.18
Gareth Lestrade, a Scotland Yard inspector who worked with Sherlock, is missing. Sherlock and Joan locate Lestrade at a bar in London and agree to help solve the case that caused him to be suspended. Lestrade accused wealthy Lawrence Pendry of killing his wife, but had no proof. Pendry claimed that an armed intruder shot her; the police arrived within minutes and the gun could not be found. A plastic gun turns out to have been made using a 3D printer; Pendry later dissolved it in acetone in a milk bottle after shooting his wife. Pendry's handyman is later found stabbed to death. Pendry printed a second gun to tie up a loose end. The gun exploded when he fired it because he used the wrong ammunition, so he had to stab the handyman with a knife. Pendry's arm injuries from the explosion secure his arrest. Meanwhile, Sherlock discovers that his brother Mycroft moved into his old apartment at 221B Baker Street. Mycroft tells Joan that he wants to make amends with Sherlock after facing a cancer diagnosis and subsequent bone marrow transplant.
26	2	"Solve for X"	Jerry Levine	Jeffrey Paul King	October 3, 2013	9.38
Mathematician Felix Soto is murdered. His walls are covered in invisible ink with his work, which is about the P versus NP problem, one that has bedeviled mathematicians. Soto's research partner Cyril Nauer is also murdered, and a mugger was shot and left for dead after seeing the killer leave Soto's apartment. The proof that P equals NP would be worth millions. Professor Tanya Barrett (Note: Lynn Collins as Tanya Barrett) evaluated Soto's work and said that they were not near a solution. Sherlock deducts that Barrett solved the problem herself, but needed more time to cash in on it. Barrett is arrested, but the federal government takes over in the interest of national security. Meanwhile, Joan meets with the son of the patient she lost during surgery; she gave up her medical career after that death. The son asks her for money to invest in a bar. She previously bought him a car, and Sherlock thinks that the young man is using Joan's guilt to extract money from her. Sherlock offers her $22,000 to buy him out of her life. She offers it as monetary support only for the son's education, but he reacts coldly to the offer.
27	3	"We Are Everyone"	Michael Pressman	Craig Sweeny	October 10, 2013	9.06
After leaking state secrets to the public, government contractor Ezra Kleinfelter (Note: Christian Campbell as Ezra Kleinfelter) is on the run. A man named Honeycutt hires Sherlock and Joan to locate him. Honeycutt works for Ezra's former employers and would most likely kill him if the detectives found him. Sherlock identifies Ezra's connection with "Everyone," a group of cyber-activists, and deduces the identity of Vanessa Hiskie, an Everyone member harboring Ezra, but she is found dead in her apartment. They also find a box that he took from a bunker where he was hiding and use it to trace him. Sherlock steals a guard's phone, realizing that he is passing messages to Ezra, but Everyone traces it to the detectives and wreaks havoc on their digital lives. Sherlock finds Ezra as he tries to leave the country on a plane owned by an Everyone member. Ezra threatens to expose fourteen American spies unless they let him go. Sherlock contacts Honeycutt and convinces him to release the list of names Ezra has to the authorities so they can get the spies to safe houses. Ezra is extradited and arrested for Hiskie's murder.
28	4	"Poison Pen"	Andrew Bernstein	Liz Friedman	October 17, 2013	8.52
Wealthy man Titus Delancy is poisoned. He is found wearing a latex bondage suit; an executive at Titus's company dressed the corpse postmortem to get out of paying a $125 million retirement bonus. Someone named Abigail Spencer (Note: Laura Benanti as Anne Barker / Abigail Spencer) works under the name Anne Barker as the nanny for Titus's sons. Years before, Abigail was charged with the murder of her father, who physically abused her. At age 15, Sherlock wrote to Abigail under the name "Sean Holmes". Graham Delancy, Titus's teenage son, ends up being his father's murderer. Graham was sexually assaulted by Titus and killed him to save his younger brother from the same fate. Sherlock reveals to Abigail his identity and says that he knows that she killed her father, citing inconsistencies in their letters and the trial. Abigail confesses to Delancy's murder to protect Graham and to pay for her crime, claiming that the victim used her past to try to extort sexual favors. Sherlock warns that he will be watching to ensure that Graham does not commit any further crimes. Sherlock also offers his ear if Graham needs help coping with what he has been through.
29	5	"Ancient History"	Sanaa Hamri	Jason Tracey	October 24, 2013	8.72
At the morgue searching for a case, Sherlock discovers that one of the dead, Leo Banin, is former Russian mafia assassin Vitaly Andropov, who garroted someone the day he died in a motorcycle accident that also claimed a young woman. He was working as a nurse and building a nursing home. Near the scene of the accident lays his victim's body, another hitman who targeted Banin for stealing $30,000 from the mob. Leo was being shot at, and that is what caused the accident. Leo's wife alerted the mobsters to his location. Banin was going to divorce her after discovering her participation in adult films to pay for her passage to the United States, leaving her nothing. He stabbed his first would-be assassin. Banin's wife shot at Banin after the second failed attempt. Meanwhile, Joan's friend asks her to find a one-night stand from a year before. That lover turns out to be Sherlock, who followed Joan at the beginning of their relationship to learn more about her. He reveals his deception to Joan's friend; who responds by sleeping with him again, then tells Joan that she is over him.
30	6	"An Unnatural Arrangement"	Christine Moore	Cathryn Humphris	October 31, 2013	9.47
An intruder invades Captain Gregson's home, terrorizing his wife and asking where he can find her husband. She shoots him, and he flees. Later, two murder victims surface, including Gregson's neighbor Lieutenant James Monroe. The killer went to the wrong house (due to a Google Maps error) and is not actually after Gregson. The victims were assigned to guard an archaeological site. Beth Roney, the archaeologist in charge, stole artifacts from the dig and is now killing her accomplices. Sherlock and Joan remember seeing a valuable bowl, one of a set found at the site, in Roney's home, but when they search her place the next day, it is gone. Sherlock realizes that her ex-husband took it. After being told of evidence incriminating him, the ex-husband confesses and implicates Roney. During the course of the investigation, Gregson is forced to reveal that his wife initiated a trial separation. He becomes angry after learning that she has been seeing another man. However, Gregson does not want to give up, gifting her a dog and apologizing for always putting the job before their marriage. Meanwhile, Sherlock gives Joan access to his box of unsolved cases.
31	7	"The Marchioness"	Sanaa Hamri	Christopher Hollier and Craig Sweeny	November 7, 2013	8.89
Mycroft is opening a new restaurant named Diogenes in New York City. Sherlock had slept with Mycroft's ex-fiancée, Nigella Mason, (Note: Olivia d'Abo as Nigella Mason) to prove to Mycroft that she was after his money. Instead of marrying Mycroft, Nigella landed a marquess. She had an affair with her stablemaster, which led to divorce. She fought hard to get Silver Blaze, a retired champion racehorse, as part of the settlement. The stablemaster is killed by someone trying to poison Silver Blaze. Nigella is charging $100,000 stud fees for Silver Blaze's services. Sherlock proves that the horse died of natural causes, so Nigella substituted his lookalike brother. One of her clients, however, was Joaquin Aguilar, the head of a drug cartel; he found out and sought revenge using a hitman. Sherlock sets a trap for the hitman and catches him. Sherlock and Mycroft promise not to turn her in as long as she pays back her victims, with the exception of Aguilar. Sherlock threatens to reveal that Aguilar sold his foal to another unsuspecting horse lover, unless Aguilar stops seeking revenge. It is eventually revealed that Joan and Mycroft slept together when they were in London and have not since talked about it.
32	8	"Blood Is Thicker"	John Polson	Bob Goodman	November 14, 2013	8.54
A woman named Haley Tyler dies after being stabbed, falling off a balcony and landing on a truck. Haley was the illegitimate daughter of technology mogul Ian Gale, (Note: William Sadler as Ian Gale) who is dying and needs a transplant. She had the same rare blood type as Gale, and had been donating blood to him. Evidence points to Gale's wife Natalie (Note: Margaret Colin as Natalie Gale) due to a will amendment giving 20% to Haley, as well as the precise location of the stabbing, suggesting medical knowledge; Mrs. Gale was a doctor. However, Mrs. Gale suggested the will change herself. Haley turns out to have been ill the week before she died. Ian later dies. Mrs. Gale turns out to have murdered both Haley and Ian: she gave Haley medicine that made her body overproduce antibodies; transfusions of her blood killed Ian, and Mrs. Gale murdered Haley to remove a loose end. Mycroft, who plans to return to London soon, proposes that Sherlock come along, saying that Morland desires it. Sherlock refuses the offer, giving a letter to Mycroft to pass on to Morland. Later, Mycroft shreds the letter; he lied to Sherlock and wants him out of New York for other reasons.
33	9	"On the Line"	Guy Ferland	Jason Tracey	November 21, 2013	9.24
A young woman, Samantha Wabash, commits suicide by shooting herself on a bridge, tying her gun to a weight so it will drop into the river below afterward. She wants to frame a man named Lucas Bundsch (Note: Troy Garity as Lucas Bundsch) as her killer. Samantha believes that Bundsch murdered her sister Allie six years before. Sherlock deduces that her death was a suicide. Bundsch is brought in anyway, but passes a polygraph test. However, Sherlock deduces that Bundsch fooled the test and concludes Bundsch was responsible for Allie's murder, as well as others. Bundsch abuses his victims for weeks before killing them. Bundsch goads Sherlock, humiliating him and Joan at one point with a wild goose chase. He texts Sherlock, using an untraceable burner phone, the address of the woman he has just taken. Sherlock finds from blueprints that when Bundsch's recording studio was built, the building lost square footage. The police find a hidden door. Sherlock picks the lock and frees the latest abductee and a woman Bundsch had held captive for years.
34	10	"Tremors"	Aaron Lipstadt	Liz Friedman	December 5, 2013	8.29
Silas Cole, a schizophrenic young man, dressed as a knight, wanders into the police station with a gun and states that he had to kill the queen. Silas's ex-girlfriend is dead, shot through the heart. However, Sherlock is convinced that Cole did not kill her; his "knight's code" would have prohibited destroying her heart, thought in medieval times to house the soul. In the course of their investigation, Sherlock unintentionally gets a man fired by revealing he is out on parole. Bell is shot in the stomach, jumping in front of Sherlock when the man comes gunning for him. The victim's heart later turns out to have been enlarged; she was participating in a trial drug program, and her doctor killed her to cover up the drug's failure. Bell asks Sherlock not to come see him anymore during his first hospital visit.
35	11	"Internal Audit"	Jerry Levine	Bob Goodman	December 12, 2013	9.09
After his Ponzi scheme is uncovered, hedge fund manager Donald Hauser is tortured for information before being killed. The woman who finds the body is a former sober client of Joan's. She refuses to allow Joan to reveal their relationship, hindering the investigation when her former drug dealer becomes the main suspect. The reporter who broke the news of Hauser's fraud is murdered the same way hours later and her laptop is stolen. Hauser turned over evidence to her that contained information about another crime. Later, the dealer's body is found in a dumpster behind an art gallery in which he is a silent partner. It turns out that Jacob Weiss, a client of Hauser's who runs a nonprofit recovering money for the heirs of Holocaust victims, was embezzling the funds. He used the gallery to launder the money. Hauser knew about it, but made the mistake of informing Weiss that he was going to reveal everything. Meanwhile, Sherlock becomes the sponsor of someone named Randy. Bell is offered a position with the Demographics Unit; if the nerve damage to his arm cannot be fixed, he will have to take a desk job.
36	12	"The Diabolical Kind"	Larry Teng	Robert Doherty and Craig Sweeny	January 2, 2014	9.04
Sherlock recognizes the voice of the man who pretended to be Moriarty in the past when the man calls with a ransom demand for a kidnapped child. Moriarty is brought in, though in electroshock hand restraints, to help track down the kidnappers in exchange for favors. The child turns out to be her daughter. Moriarty's lieutenant wants a collection of valuable information Moriarty has amassed over her career. After disabling her restraints, escaping and dealing with all her daughter's abductors, an injured Moriarty allows Sherlock to take her back into custody, predicting that she will be free soon anyway. Sherlock realizes that she may have started to redeem herself; she refrained from killing her head jailer when she escaped.
37	13	"All in the Family"	Andrew Bernstein	Jason Tracey	January 9, 2014	9.97
An assignment with the Demographics Unit leads Bell to discover a body in a barrel. The victim is a member of the Pardillo Mafia family who had been in hiding for years. A member of a rival family becomes a suspect. He dies from a car explosion some time later. The National Security Agency (NSA) supplied the killer with information about Pardillo's whereabouts. Sherlock confronts an NSA agent, accusing the agency of having a leak. The agent says that Bell's new boss, NYPD Deputy Commissioner Da Silva, requested the information. Da Silva was trying to dispose of everyone who knew about him working for the Mafia for his entire police career. Sherlock informs Bell, who steals evidence linking Da Silva to the Pardillo family. They set a trap; when he tries to assassinate Robert Pardillo, (Note: Paul Sorvino as Robert Pardillo) the victim's father and head of the family, the police are waiting. Bell rejoins Major Crimes.
38	14	"Dead Clade Walking"	Helen Shaver	Jeffrey Paul King	January 30, 2014	10.34
While investigating one of Sherlock's cold cases, Joan spots an out-of-place rock in the murder victim's garden. She enlists a geologist to study the photo. Joan eventually steals the rock. It contains a very rare complete dinosaur fossil worth millions. The rock is later stolen from the police evidence room. Tracking down a very high-end smuggler, Sherlock and Joan find the man murdered and the fossil smashed to pieces. They eventually determine the curator of a natural history museum committed the murders to destroy proof of a scientific theory that would have ruined his reputation. Meanwhile, Sherlock has his hands full as a sponsor when Randy's addict girlfriend turns back up in his life.
39	15	"Corpse de Ballet"	Jean de Segonzac	Liz Friedman	February 6, 2014	9.45
When a ballerina is murdered, evidence seems to point to the dance company's star performer, world famous diva Iris Lanzer. (Note: Aleksa Palladino as Iris Lanzer) The killer steals a hard drive containing the venue's surveillance footage. Sherlock is convinced Lanzer is not guilty; he accepts her offer to sleep with her. An audio recording is leaked to the tabloids, it reveals Iris's intimate relationship with the victim, but Sherlock deconstructs the recording and deduces that Iris's lawyer is the murderer, using the publicity to further his career. The police find the stolen hard drive in the lawyer's home. Meanwhile, Joan looks into a missing homeless man, a veteran with severe post-traumatic stress disorder, prompting her to open up to Sherlock about her biological father, who is schizophrenic and lives on the streets. Joan locates the missing man, kidnapped and held captive with two others by a couple who collect their benefit checks.
40	16	"The One Percent Solution"	Guy Ferland	S : Bob Goodman; S/T : Craig Sweeny	February 27, 2014	8.66
Sherlock and Joan are called to investigate a bombing at a restaurant that targeted finance executives and government officials. On the case, they are reunited and forced to work with Gareth Lestrade, who is now consulting for one of the CEOs involved in the case. Videotape from the hotel attached to the restaurant leads Sherlock and Joan to suspect that Lestrade is covering up his boss's involvement. The CEO is being targeted by a blackmailer who knows about the women (and occasionally men) who have traded sex for favors and that Lestrade has been the intermediary making the actual offers. The CEO is forced to reveal his involvement in order to catch the blackmailing bomber. A subordinate of a government bureaucrat killed her boss so she could take his position and see the federal jobs report before the general public, information she could use to make a fortune in the stock market. Lestrade loses his job and comes to stay with Sherlock and Joan.
41	17	"Ears to You"	Seith Mann	Lauren MacKenzie and Andrew Gettens	March 6, 2014	8.54
Gordon Cushing's wife disappeared in 2010; he was acquitted in a murder trial, but many people still think he is guilty. One day, he receives two severed human ears along with a ransom note. The DNA matches that of Cushing's wife, Sarah. At the ransom exchange, Cushing pursues the suspect and unintentionally kills him. Clues on the suspect's body lead Sherlock and Joan to an AA meeting, where they find Sarah, who is both alive and not earless. Sarah says that the DNA they collected when she disappeared was not hers and belongs to her husband's mistress; however, she died in 2011 in a car accident. Sherlock realizes that Sarah's plastic surgeon husband grew two exact replicas of her ears on her back and then cut them off in an elaborate attempt to collect the ransom from Cushing. Meanwhile, Lestrade is mugged and Joan encourages him to solve his own case in order to lift his spirits and get him to move on with his life. He is successful and accepts a position with the Garda Síochána, the Irish national police.
42	18	"The Hound of the Cancer Cells (Note: The episode title references the Arthur Conan Doyle novel The Hound of the Baskervilles, which was later adapted in season 4.)"	Michael Slovis	Bob Goodman	March 13, 2014	8.94
Researcher Barry Granger has been testing the "Hound", a breathalyzer for detecting cancer. He is eventually murdered. His research was alleged as fraud by an expert in the field under the pseudonym Adam Peer. The allegation looks set to ruin both Granger and the firm that employed him, a company run by Hank Prince. The allegation is actually false, and Peer was two people: Granger and another, but Prince hacked their email to make the fraud allegations against Granger. Prince later murders his wife. Earlier he had tried to trash his firm's value by masquerading as Peer and impugning Granger, so that she would receive in their divorce only some of the company's depressed value, which would then rebound once Granger's research was vindicated. Bell, recovered from his injury and returned to field duty, asks Joan to find a missing witness to a street killing. She changed her mind about testifying after she became pregnant and is hiding with a former tutor, Manny Rose. (Note: Ron Canada as Manny Rose) Bell tells Rose to tell the witness that her testifying does not matter as they will get the perpetrator next time. The killer and Rose are later found shot to death - Rose decided to dispense his own vigilante justice.
43	19	"The Many Mouths of Aaron Colville"	Larry Teng	Jason Tracey	April 3, 2014	7.83
Bite marks on two murdered women echo the trademark of Aaron Colville, a man convicted as a serial killer who subsequently died in prison. This raises the question of Colville's possible innocence. The bite marks are traced to ex-con Alan Vikner with the help of hacker collective Everyone. However, when he is brought in, Vikner shows that he has dentures; eight sets were made from the same mold (of Colville's teeth) for inmates at Colville's prison. Eventually, Sherlock and Joan eliminate all the convicts as suspects. Finally, Sherlock realizes that the person who stands to benefit the most from exonerating Colville is his mother, who has sued the city for millions of dollars in his alleged wrongful conviction. Joan has a connection with the murders, as she was a part of the operating team that tried to save Colville's life. She suspects that the doctor in charge recognized Colville and may have deliberately erred in the resuscitation procedure. She has no proof, and the doctor tells her that he himself is not sure if he did or not.
44	20	"No Lack of Void"	Sanaa Hamri	Liz Friedman and Jeffrey Paul King	April 10, 2014	7.90
When a pickpocket collapses in jail, Joan starts to help, then realizes he seems to have contracted anthrax. He stole the anthrax from someone, thinking it was cocaine, then swallowed it when he was apprehended. The man dies. One of the pickpocketed items leads to Charlie Simon. He had the expertise to make anthrax spores, but they find him dead at his storage locker laboratory. From the empty trays there, Sherlock deduces he made 40 pounds of the stuff. Eugene MacIntosh, a member of an anti-government group known as the Sovereign Army, becomes the prime suspect. He is shot dead by his brother Bart when he goes to Bart's failing farm. However, it turns out that the brothers were actually trying to kill off Bart's herd of cows for a multimillion-dollar insurance scam. Sherlock's close friend Alistair dies, which catches Sherlock off guard. He reacts by acting out of character, causing Joan to go into sober companion mode and making him talk about it. After it gets out that Alistair died of a heroin overdose, Sherlock struggles even more. Eventually, he confesses to Alistair at his grave that he loved him dearly and will miss him.
45	21	"The Man with the Twisted Lip"	Seith Mann	T : Craig Sweeny; S/T : Steve Gottfried	April 24, 2014	8.13
Sherlock and Joan investigate the disappearance of Paige, the sister of a woman who frequents Sherlock's sobriety meetings. At the brownstone, they are surprised by Mycroft, who returned to New York, apparently to focus on Diogenes. Later, Joan meets Sherlock at a park he found based on a clue in one of Paige's songs. The pair find two bodies there, Paige's and that of a Zach Piller, who manufactured drones for a company called McCarthy-Strauss. The two victims were killed by Piller's drones. Sherlock later visits Diogenes and sees Guillaume de Soto, a high-ranking member of French drug cartel Le Milieu. Sherlock then captures a drone that was spying on him. Piller's psychiatrist says that he accidentally misidentified ten undercover CIA agents in Afghanistan, who were then killed by friendly fire. He subsequently wrote a report on it out of guilt. The psychiatrist is eventually poisoned by another drone. To incriminate McCarthy-Strauss, Sherlock waits at a pier to meet with the business executive that Piller's report belongs to, while Joan breaks into the executive's office and steals the report. That night, Joan follows de Soto's contact Marchef outside Diogenes after he receives an envelope. She retrieves the envelope, but finds a picture of herself inside. The contact kidnaps her.
46	22	"Paint It Black"	Lucy Liu	Robert Hewitt Wolfe	May 1, 2014	7.79
Mycroft receives a call from Joan's kidnapper. Le Milieu previously offered Mycroft money to open up Diogenes in New York to serve as their headquarters, followed by various requests. Meanwhile, Swiss bank executive Pierce Norman plans to sell a list of thousands of bank executives' names and information to the black market. The NSA is onto Norman, but Sherlock wants to get to him first. Norman's boyfriend points the brothers to a remote home his lover owned. There, they find Norman's corpse. Norman was killed before the list was downloaded and was framed. Joan, meanwhile, operates on a Le Milleu soldier who was shot in the abdomen. She insists that the man be taken to a hospital or he will die; her kidnapped shoots him. That night, Sherlock and Mycroft track down the real perpetrator, Norman's employer's head of security, Kurt Yoder. (Note: Michael Gaston as Kurt Yoder) Yoder is interrogated that night at the brownstone and eventually mentions the hard drive the list is on. After recovering it, Sherlock decides to call the NSA, fearing that Le Milieu will betray them, but Mycroft, who is under orders from a British contact, incapacitates Sherlock with a taser and heads out to meet the dealers, while the NSA later refuses Sherlock's requests to save Joan. Mycroft gives Yoder and the list to the dealers, but de Soto orders his henchmen to kill them, and leaves. Mycroft signals British Intelligence snipers, who kill de Soto's men.
47	23	"Art in the Blood"	Guy Ferland	Bob Goodman	May 8, 2014	7.54
Sherlock returns home to find Joan safe. Mycroft is actually working for MI6. MI6 utilized Mycroft's observational skills to investigate criminal groups such as Le Milieu. Mycroft's handler, Tim Sherrington, (Note: Ralph Brown as Tim Sherrington) wanted Sherlock out of New York. Sherrington hires Sherlock to investigate the murder of Arthur West, an MI6 analyst. West's arms were stolen from the morgue. West's estranged wife, Marion (Note: Emily Bergl as Marion West) is a tattoo artist; she tattooed West's arms with information using invisible ink. West was confident that there was a mole within MI6, communicating with bookstore owner Julian Afkhami. Sherrington eventually offers Sherlock a job at MI6. Marion, meanwhile, tells Joan about one "Sudomo Han". Mycroft had left MI6, but rejoined in exchange for Sherlock's freedom. While he was a drug addict in Britain, Sherlock had worked for Han as a courier, unaware that the latter was a terrorist. Joan and Mycroft eventually have sex. Elsewhere, Sherlock learns that the gun used to kill West bore fingerprints bearing a distinctive scar. He identifies the fingerprints as Mycroft's.
48	24	"The Grand Experiment"	John Polson	Robert Doherty and Craig Sweeny	May 15, 2014	7.37
Mycroft is being framed as the mole, so Sherlock relocates him and Joan to a vacant, remote library accessible only to Sherlock. The three identity Sherrington as the mole, but decide to keep it quiet. Sherrington eventually visits Joan at the brownstone to confront her, but Joan had invited members of "Everyone" to a video chat to have witnesses for protection. Sherrington leaves. He had made seventeen calls to his contact Afkhami, who is spying for the Iranian government. Sherlock and Joan investigate a murder believed to be linked to Afkhami. He deduces that the victim was stoned to death. Afkhami's wife was having an affair, so he killed her lover. Sherrington betrayed MI6 because of a lack of promotion or respect due, he believes, to his working-class background. The NYPD later finds Sherrington's corpse. Mycroft made a deal with the NSA for them to kill Sherrington and fake Mycroft's own death to protect Joan and the brothers from Le Milieu. Mycroft embraces Sherlock and says that he loves him. While Joan makes plans to move into a new apartment, Sherlock accepts MI6's invitation to join them.

=== Season 3 (2014–15) ===
No. overall	No. in season	Title	Directed by	Written by	Original release date	U.S. viewers (millions)
49	1	"Enough Nemesis to Go Around"	John Polson	Robert Doherty and Craig Sweeny	October 30, 2014	7.57
Six months after Joan moved out, she is running her own investigation firm and helps bust female drug kingpin Elana March. (Note: Gina Gershon as Elana March) Two months later, the case has gone stagnant and the key witness in the prosecution of the kingpin is murdered in a hotel elevator. To her surprise, Joan discovers Sherlock has returned with a new protégé named Kitty Winter, and is working on the case as well, after being fired from MI6. The three must find a way to get along and work together while finding the murderer, skilled hitman Kevin Elspeth. (Note: Brennan Brown as Kevin Elspeth) Sherlock solves the "locked room" mystery of the elevator - the murderer placed spent bullets carefully in the elevator and used an extremely powerful electromagnet to propel them into the two victims from his hotel room next to the elevator. Joan realises that while the killer brought the disassembled parts of the magnet into the hotel in luggage and packages, he could not take them out quickly. She finds the parts hidden in his shower seat. Fingerprints inside the rubber gloves used to handle the magnet identify the murderer.
50	2	"The Five Orange Pipz (Note: The title of this episode is a reference to the short story The Five Orange Pips by Sir Arthur Conan Doyle.)"	Larry Teng	Bob Goodman	November 6, 2014	7.07
A double murder appears to be revenge for the deaths of children poisoned by GHB, the inadvertent result of cost-cutting measures taken by the Indian manufacturer of toy beads. Each of the victims received five orange beads in the mail. The father of one of the children confesses, but Sherlock deduces that he is lying. FBI agent Vince Boden refuses to provide whatever information the agency has, citing policy. Evidence vital to the case against the murdered men has gone missing, which complicates figuring out the motive for the crimes. At first, Sherlock suspects the prosecutor, US Attorney Angela White, as the collapse of her case would end her ambition to be elected to a Senate seat. White admits to being blackmailed by one of the murdered men, but denies killing them. Then Sherlock realises who the killer is. Boden wanted the case to never come to trial, so he could then easily steal the no-longer-needed evidence: the GHB, an addictive drug worth millions of dollars on the black market.
51	3	"Just a Regular Irregular"	Jerry Levine	Robert Hewitt Wolfe	November 13, 2014	6.53
Mathematician Harlan Emple (Note: Rich Sommer as Harlan Emple (also in the episode "Solve for X")) comes across a dead body packed in mothballs while participating in a "math hunt", a number game with a puzzle involving Belphegor's prime. When another body is found, it is believed that the game is intended to be a death trap for mathematicians or, as it turns out, one mathematician in particular. Meanwhile, Joan tries to convince Kitty, who was a rape victim, to join a support group.
52	4	"Bella"	Guy Ferland	Craig Sweeny	November 20, 2014	6.49
Software developer Edwin Borstein has created an artificial intelligence (AI) program called Bella, and he hires Sherlock because someone has broken into his company and stolen a copy of the program. Sherlock takes the case, not because he finds it interesting, but because he does not believe AI is achievable. He solves the theft case, but then Borstein dies from a fatal epileptic seizure, seemingly caused by Bella through rapidly cycling images displayed on Borstein's monitor. Sherlock finds a program hidden on a music CD death metal fan Borstein was given. Eventually he traces the criminal to a think tank that believes that AI is the greatest threat to human existence. He is confident that its leading light, computer science professor Isaac Pike, is responsible, but a devotee confesses, despite having no programming skills. Meanwhile, Joan's boyfriend Andrew receives a job offer that would take him to Copenhagen, and Joan wonders if Sherlock is responsible for it.
53	5	"Rip Off"	John Polson	Jason Tracey	November 27, 2014	6.11
A severed hand is seen in a street puddle. It belongs to the corpse of Orthodox Jew Moshe Shapiro. Shapiro owned a Postal Unlimited store nearby. A hidden safe contains Moshe's ledger. Moshe turns out to have been a diamond smuggler. Sherlock deduces that weightlifter Dana Kazmir ripped the hand off. Kazmir confesses to the murder and provides a list of three other people he was supposed to kill, which includes Amit Hattengatti, the store's only employee. The NYPD intercept a cash payment to Kazmir, and the envelope matches the office supplies in Moshe's shop. Amit was actually Moshe's smuggling partner. He had plotted with Kazmir and Kazmir's corrupt lawyer to make it look like he was a murder target to deflect suspicion. (Moshe had reformed and was planning to end his smuggling operation.) Kazmir, doomed to jail anyway, lied in return for a payout for his family. Amit eventually names his diamond supplier. Meanwhile, Sherlock gets Kitty to sign a non-disclosure agreement after finding Joan's unpublished "The Casebook of Sherlock Holmes". Gregson punches a policeman, who had twice abused Gregson's daughter Hannah.
54	6	"Terra Pericolosa"	Aaron Lipstadt	S : Jeffrey Paul King; S/T : Bob Goodman	December 4, 2014	6.59
Joan returns from Denmark. Kitty is called to a museum, where valuable old maps and a security guard are missing. The guard is dead. One particular map was the target; the rest were taken just to camouflage that fact. That map, "The County of King James, Virginia, 1794", was loaned to the museum by a now-deceased member of the Bray family decades before. The family's charitable organization still exists, and is run by Margaret Bray. The thief is ex-cartography student Stuart Zupco, who turns up dead. The missing maps are found at his framing shop, but the Bray map is a forgery. It and the original are almost identical, except the course of a section of a river has been altered. That one change provides the motive. A billion-dollar casino, envisioned by real estate mogul William Hull, (Note: Skipp Sudduth as William Hull) is to be built on land affected by the alteration. Bray's family owns property neighboring the site; the casino would send the value of the surrounding real estate sky high. Bray was the killer; without the map change, the project would have to be abandoned.
55	7	"The Adventure of the Nutmeg Concoction"	Christine Moore	Peter Ocko	December 11, 2014	7.63
Joan's new client wants to find out about her sister, Jessica Holder, who disappeared five years before. The smell of nutmeg was detected at the site of Jessica's disappearance and those of others. Noah Kramer, a married lawyer with whom Jessica was having an affair, told her that his client, Raymond Carpenter, was guilty of several murders; she was going to tell the police. In Sing Sing, Carpenter admits that he outsourced her murder, but the killer is now dead. A new crime scene with the scent of nutmeg is found. The murders are connected only by the same cleaner being employed to dissolve the bodies, who masked the odors of the cleaning concoction with nutmeg. At an institute which offers certification in cleaning up crime scenes, Sherlock spots a lurid mural featuring nutmeg. The artist, Conrad Woodbine, is the cleaner, but refuses to identify any of his clients and is himself murdered and cleaned. Carpenter's youngest son was Woodbine's apprentice. He killed him on Carpenter's orders. Sherlock and Joan promise that if Carpenter calls his son and tells him to work with the police, they will make sure that he is put in a safer prison. Carpenter agrees.
56	8	"End of Watch"	Ron Fortunato	Robert Hewitt Wolfe	December 18, 2014	7.57
Flynn, a Highway Patrol officer, is murdered; his sidearm had been replaced with an airsoft gun. Flynn was a drug addict. He stole guns from the police department's Rodman's Neck Armory, replacing them with airsoft guns, and sold the real weapons to fund his addiction. His buyer, Buros, a wanted arms dealer, already had buyers lined up for the prized military-grade police weapons, but Flynn, now clean, refused to obtain more for him. Buros killed Flynn, as he would be given an inspector's funeral attended by thousands of police officers, leaving the Armory poorly guarded, but Flynn's crimes came to light and his special funeral was canceled. So Buros kills another officer to cause another such funeral. He steals the weapons. Watson identifies the white fibers he left at both murder scenes as upholstery fibers - Buros plans to ship the weapons hidden inside furniture. He is arrested after his cargo shipment is traced. Meanwhile, Sherlock finds the person posting his personal statements made in sobriety meetings on a recovery blog, and insists they take the blog down, as anonymity is vital for the success of the meetings.
57	9	"The Eternity Injection"	Larry Teng	Craig Sweeny	January 8, 2015	8.60
A nurse Joan knew is missing. The woman's trail leads to an illegal human drug trial of EZM-77, a time-dilating substance. Five test subjects were injected. The higher the dose the madder they went (one killed the missing nurse, who administered the drug) and they die or are murdered. Carlisle, on the lowest dose, survives and his interview leads to Purgatorium, a company which paid the test subjects $150,000 up front and promised the same amount every year. The drug's inventor, Dwyer Kirk, takes responsibility for the deaths. His sponsor, James Connaughton, paid for Kirk's education and gave his aunt a stipend to help raise him. When Connaughton learned that he was dying, he approached Kirk, who agreed to try to develop a "pharmaceutical fountain of youth" so that its time-dilating properties would make his last days feel like years. The trial subjects were executed to cover it up. Connaughton's new nurse connects him with Purgatorium and with two hitmen he hired to murder the test subjects. The police come for Connaughton, who appears non-responsive; he has injected himself with EZM-77, hoping to "extend" what little time he has left to live.
58	10	"Seed Money"	John Polson	Brian Rodenbeck	January 15, 2015	8.09
An elderly couple dies in bed. They are inadvertent casualties of another crime committed elsewhere in the building. Someone burned rubber in the basement, which emitted a toxic gas. Sherlock finds a burned body with a tire around his neck. Clay Dubrovensky was the second floor tenant who worked for the criminal SDS Cartel, growing marijuana for them. A valuable orchid, the last of its kind, grows in the greenhouse. Barbara Conway, from AgriNext, bought an orchid from Clay. Sherlock examines both plants and realizes that Clay cloned the orchid twice. Two AgriNext executives are murdered by the same burning tire necklace method, and their bodies dumped in front of the AgriNext building. However, the rope is different from that used in Clay's murder. Conway admits that AgriNext offered Clay a job and was trying to buy out his relationship with the SDS. The police arrest the SDS member guilty of the AgriNext murders. He denies killing Clay. Conway turns out to have killed Clay because he was seeing his ex-girlfriend again.
59	11	"The Illustrious Client"	Guy Ferland	Jason Tracey	January 22, 2015	8.28
A woman is murdered, and her premortem back scars resemble Kitty's. A burner phone left at a bar the woman was at leads the NYPD to a suspect, Simon de Merville. Simon works for a brothel that kidnaps illegal immigrants, and in his property is the body of one of the brothel's suppliers, as well as women captives. Simon might have been injured during the lethal confrontation with the supplier and went to his sister Violet (Note: Tammy Blanchard as Violet de Merville) for assistance. Kitty beats Violet into cooperating with the NYPD. Violet calls Simon to allow the NYPD to triangulate the call. Simon is aboard a boat; Osweiler, (Note: David Valcin as Osweiler) a bartender and former neighbor of Simon's has one. However, the boat, stored at the owner's house, is burned, with Simon locked inside. At the morgue, Kitty inspects the body and insists that Simon was not her rapist; she had broken her captor's fingers in her escape, and Simon's fingers are intact. Later, Joan, who has settled into her new job at the insurance firm, calls her new boss, Del Gruner. (Note: Stuart Townsend as Del Gruner) Kitty, overhearing the conversation, recognizes the voice of her rapist.
60	12	"The One That Got Away"	Seith Mann	Robert Doherty	January 29, 2015	7.69
Del Gruner abruptly fires Joan. Sherlock begins exploring the backgrounds of kidnapped and murdered women who match Gruner's modus operandi. They track down Tabitha Laird, a coworker of Gruner's at a charity to which he donates his time and money. Laird's adopted son turns out to be the child of Gruner and one of the victims on Sherlock's list. Kitty secretly captures Gruner, unaware of the evidence tying him with his crimes. She prepares to kill him and dissolve his body using a corrosive liquid. (Note: A recreation of the one featured in "The Adventure of the Nutmeg Concoction".) Sherlock finds her and mentions the new evidence. He then says that he will not stop her from doing whatever she decides to do, and that she will always be his friend. Kitty burns most of Gruner's face off with the concoction and leaves him to be found by the NYPD. She leaves for an unknown location.
61	13	"Hemlock"	Christine Moore	Arika Lisanne Mittman	February 5, 2015	7.87
The wife of missing lawyer Steven Horowitz hires Sherlock to find him. Sherlock and Joan discover that he did not tell his wife he had been fired by his firm. They find out that he went to work for a debt collection agency and was given a debt package worth millions. Sherlock and Joan try to narrow down the pool of suspects from the thousands of debtors. It turns out that Horowitz had a change of heart after seeing the hardships suffered by the debtors and forgave what he had not yet collected. One of those released from their financial burden is a man named Downey. A company wants to create a ski resort; Downey is the sole holdout, refusing to sell his house, which happens to be at the center of the resort. Horowitz's former boss killed him because he stood in the way of the law firm collecting millions in fees from the developer. Meanwhile, Andrew asks Joan to dinner to meet his father for the first time. Sherlock warns her that this is a significant step in their romantic relationship, but she dismisses the idea, until she discovers she is wrong. She concludes she must break up with Andrew. While she is doing so, he is poisoned.
62	14	"The Female of the Species"	Lucy Liu	Jeffrey Paul King	February 12, 2015	7.91
Elana March tells Joan she had Andrew murdered in revenge. Sherlock enlists Detective Bell to help him find two missing pregnant zebras stolen from a zoo. A trademarked color provides the first clue; the color is only used on delivery vans for one company. They eventually find the zebras, who have given birth. They also find a veterinarian, shot dead; he was forced to help with the induced premature births. They later find a quagga, which went extinct over a century before. The zoo's staff are gathered at the police station. Sherlock identifies the real murderer, a PhD student. The killer escapes police surveillance through an old speakeasy tunnel. Realizing that the student needs to raise funds for his getaway, Sherlock wins the online auction for the second quagga and sets a trap. Later, Joan receives a letter from Moriarty. It says that she had Elana murdered because Moriarty feels that she will have further interactions with Sherlock, and secondarily Joan as well, so no interloper can be allowed to interfere. Despite the confession, Sherlock doubts that they will find any evidence to connect Elana's murder to Moriarty.
63	15	"When Your Number's Up"	Jerry Levine	Bob Goodman	February 19, 2015	8.21
Sherlock and Joan investigate two murders in which the killer leaves envelopes of cash on the victims equating to their "worth". The probe leads the two to investigate an airline crash which killed over 80 people and the amount that each would receive as wrongful death compensation according to an equation formulated by attorney Arlen Schrader. When Dana Powell, (Note: Alicia Witt as Dana Powell) the wife of one of the crash victims, reports being shot at from her back yard, Sherlock becomes suspicious, as the first two shootings were at short range. Powell gives a seemingly tone-deaf television interview, which forces the airline to drop its method of calculation to making the same flat payment to each next-of-kin. This is puzzling, as Powell's husband was a highly successful broker. Then they discover that the husband had a fatal disease, with only a few months to live. The police obtain a search warrant for her mansion, where they find incriminating evidence. Meanwhile, Joan moves into the basement at the brownstone, and seals the interior door so that in future she will have a physically separate space, but still be able to work closely with Sherlock.
64	16	"For All You Know"	Guy Ferland	Peter Ocko	March 5, 2015	7.67
A woman named Maria Gutierrez vanishes in 2011. Her body is found three years later. Sherlock wrote a signed note found in her purse, giving his address and a meeting time, but says that he does not know her. However, he was a heavy drug user then, which caused blackouts and memory loss. Maria worked as a cleaner at the offices of Councilman Robert Barclay. Junkie Oscar Rankin knew Maria and had boasted of knowing Sherlock. Maria met with Sherlock and brought bloodied clothes belonging to Barclay. She had seen him take off the clothes and throw them away. Barclay had been having an affair with Kelsey Prior, a friend's wife, but when she tried to end it, he stabbed her. Barclay decided to dump his bag of blood-stained clothes somewhere secure, but found that it was missing. He guessed that Maria had taken it and lured her from Frobisher Motel in Bayside, where Sherlock often stashed witnesses who were in danger. Barclay killed Maria and hid her body, and Sherlock, high on drugs, forgot her. Barclay confesses. Sherlock encourages Oscar to quit heroin and gives him a paid reservation at a rehabilitation center, feeling responsible for Oscar's condition.
65	17	"T-Bone and the Iceman"	Michael Slovis	Jason Tracey	March 12, 2015	7.58
A distracted driver is killed after colliding with a van and discovering that it carries corpses. The driver's body is partially mummified, by the coolant R22. Sherlock's investigation leads to a cryogenics facility owned by a cash-strapped company that preserves the bodies of clients in the hope that future advances can revive them. There, the corpse of strangled psychiatrist Jim Sullivan, has been stolen. New patient Vance Ford provided a sketch of the murderer. Ford, however, is lying. Later, Ford is found strangled as well, which seems odd, as he was near death from leukemia anyway. The man in the sketch is actually a now-deceased actor from a movie. (Note: More specifically, Manos: The Hands of Fate.) Ford and Sullivan were estranged cousins. Sullivan was a match for a bone marrow transplant, which could have saved Ford's life, but he refused to donate it. Ford killed him and stole the body, as the bone marrow, even after being frozen, would still be usable. Ford recruited two henchmen, who worked at the cryonics lab. With the investigation closing in, they panicked and killed Ford the same way as Sullivan. Meanwhile, Joan has trouble convincing her mother to seek help for her failing mind.
66	18	"The View From Olympus"	Seith Mann	S : Jordan Rosenberg; T : Bob Goodman	April 2, 2015	7.48
Galen Barrow, a driver for ridesharing company Zooss, is run over by a city cab. The murder was staged to look like professional rivalry. Barrow was an internet journalist and had begun working for Zooss recently. Registered sex offender Gordon Meadows admits to having killed Barrow; he was blackmailed into it after he broke his parole. Barrow's internet journalism employer, Lydia Guerrero, was having an affair with Barrow and was also being blackmailed by an anonymous texter. Despite her opposition, Barrow insisted on hunting the blackmailer. Zooss CEO Eric Frazier orders technician Brandon Felchek to hand over to the police computer program Olympus, which records user details and tracks all rides. A man named Patrick Kemp worked for Zooss before a mugger killed him a month earlier. Patrick turns out to have been the blackmailer at Zooss. Falchek is eventually arrested: he had cut off Patrick's access to Olympus months before on discovering that he was blackmailing users, not to protect Zooss or its users but to avoid drawing attention to his own crime; Falchek was using Olympus to stalk Felice Armistead and broke into her home where she surprised him and he broke her cheekbone.
67	19	"One Watson, One Holmes"	John Polson	Robert Hewitt Wolfe	April 9, 2015	7.03
Everyone member "Species", real name Errol White, is killed by a now-missing samurai sword. It is later revealed that Species was secretly two people, an arrangement that allowed Species to always be online. The other half of Species is someone named Bradley Dietz. Dietz killed White when he rejected Dietz's idea of hacking think tank the Atherton Foundation, feeling that it was too dangerous. Dietz is capitalising on Everyone's sympathy for Species's death to gain power, and the hack is imminent. When confronted, Dietz is rescued by FBI Agent Branch, who provides an alibi. Branch wants Everyone to hack Atherton, which coordinates FBI and Homeland Security investigations with the internal security departments of major corporations. If Everyone hacks Atherton, the group would be arrested for treason and Branch would gain rapid promotion. Sherlock knows Branch's secret (knowingly exploiting an illegal immigrant) and will report her unless she gives the police an anonymous tip on where to find the sword. Everyone is warned about Atherton, so Dietz becomes useless to her. Branch caves in. Dietz is arrested.
68	20	"A Stitch in Time"	Ron Fortunato	Peter Ocko	April 16, 2015	7.56
Debunker Garrison Boyd is killed. Boyd accused real estate developer Collin Eisley of trying to scare a woman into selling a beach house, as she was hearing unusual noises. This was actually the result of tunneling from a neighbor's house. The tunnel's target is Ruby, the world's fastest transatlantic internet cable. Ruby feeds certain investment firms. The digger is Nadim Al-Haj, an Iraqi man. Nadim eventually torches his apartment to destroy evidence and flees. Data went into a device there and came out intact, but with a delay of 4 milliseconds. Those firms had an advantage, as they received data milliseconds earlier than rivals, enough time for computer transactions. Eisley's blind trust is managed by a firm whose computer servers are not there. Eisley hired Nadim to splice in the device to flip the time advantage in favor of his investment company. After Nadim killed Boyd, Eisley paid him with a Picasso to stay quiet. The Picasso has been reported as stolen, rendering it unsellable, so Nadim will eventually make a deal with the authorities. Eisley is encouraged to do the same. Meanwhile, Hannah Gregson asks Joan to help with a case.
69	21	"Under My Skin"	Aaron Lipstadt	Jeffrey Paul King	April 23, 2015	7.73
A man shoots two paramedics and steals their ambulance with patient Maggie Halpern inside. A man named Wallace Turk later admits the murders. Halpern is also murdered, and her body is eviscerated by Turk's partner. Halpern was an unwitting drug mule who had received what she thought was normal surgery in Brazil. Her surgeon, Turk's brother-in-law, planted heroin inside her, then vanished. Drug gang leader Janko Stepovic uses the offices of dentist Dr Marty Ward. Bell tells Janko that if he buys the heroin, the NYPD will go after him. However, if he can help find the heroin, it will not be in the hands of rival gangs. Janko sets up a sting, but is killed elsewhere. Ward eventually gives up and agrees to tell all, including the location of two other mules' bodies. Meanwhile, a manufacturer hires Alfredo Llamosa, Sherlock's recovery sponsor, to test a security system, but fires him after Alfredo points out its flaws. They also spread false claims that he was high again. As revenge, Alfredo starts stealing their cars. Considering Alfredo his friend, Sherlock steals cars while Alfredo has an alibi. As being a sponsor is incompatible with friendship, Sherlock fires Alfredo.
70	22	"The Best Way Out Is Always Through"	Michael Slovis	Arika Lisanne Mittman	April 30, 2015	7.03
Judge Dennis Vaughn is killed with a screwdriver. While in New York City for a fundraiser for a governor's re-election, Vaughn had sex with one of the governor's staffers; her alibi depends on a friend, Andrea Schuster. Fingerprints on the screwdriver belong to Nikki Moreno, who escaped from a correctional facility days earlier. At the for-profit prison, run by Reform Enterprises (RE), Deputy Warden Trey McCann says that Moreno was a troublemaker. Later, McCann is murdered. Jeff Harper, a prisoner rights lawyer, says that Moreno had nothing against Vaughn, but hated McCann, and had no reason to escape or commit murder as he was close to getting her sentence reduced. He says that Moreno was forced into an unpleasant work detail recycling computers, but her prison record shows that she had asked for the detail. Moreno's body appears in a recycling bin. McCann had previously worked for another prison management company. Their executive, Perry Franklin, reveals that McCann was fired for corruption. Andrea Schuster was the re-election campaign manager. The murders were intended to cause the governor to award the new prison contract to Franklin's firm. Meanwhile, Bell discovers that his girlfriend secretly works for Internal Affairs.
71	23	"Absconded"	Guy Ferland	Jason Tracey	May 7, 2015	6.92
Testing to learn the cause of Colony collapse disorder (CCD), USDA employee Everett Keck visits Belinda's honey farm. Keck and her bees die from cyanide in his smoker. AgriNext might be behind CCD in Northeast USA. AgriNext's company executive denies murder, saying that they had been ready to counter Keck's accusations by discrediting him. Belinda's neighbor, Darryl Jarvis, had filed a complaint that Keck poisoned his bee hives with deadly mites. Jarvis actually murdered Keck. Mites did appear wherever Keck inspected hives. Keck's supervisor, Calvin Barnes, had been investigating him. This ceased once Barnes became an invalid after being poisoned. However, Keck has an alibi. Before Keck's bee-killing, CCD and academic research funding were decreasing; if CCD apparently increases, funding would rise. Meanwhile, Tara and Griffin Parker are married professors of agriculture organizing an apiary conference. Sheikh Nasser Al-Fayed, of the United Arab Emirates (UAE) royal family, will attend. The Parkers lured Nasser to the United States by manufacturing a rising CCD crisis through Keck and kidnap Nasser. Later, Nasser is on a plane (ransom paid). With the UAE's denials, there can be no kidnap charges. Proof appears that Tara was having an affair with Keck. Furious, Griffin turns on Tara, who was there when he poisoned Barnes.
72	24	"A Controlled Descent"	John Polson	Robert Doherty	May 14, 2015	6.96
Oscar Rankin (Note: From the episode "For All You Know".) kidnaps Alfredo to leverage Sherlock into finding Oscar's missing sister Olivia, a fellow drug addict. Sherlock searches for Olivia with Oscar, visiting his former rehabilitation center and an active heroin den. At the den, the discarded contents of a stolen wallet contain the driving licence of Jonathan Bloom, a sexual predator who lures with heroin and is believed to have killed two women. Sherlock tortures Bloom into admitting that he took Olivia but she fought him, stole his money and heroin and escaped in a taxi. Olivia then went to an abandoned railway tunnel. There, Sherlock finds her dead of a heroin overdose. She has been dead for two days. All along Oscar knew of this. Oscar led Sherlock through the places Olivia had been to make him realize that Sherlock is as bad as he is and that it is inevitable that Sherlock will use again. Oscar then reveals a box with heroin, saying that he needs one more push. Joan texts Sherlock that they have found Alfredo alive. Sherlock beats Oscar, and picks up the box. Days later, Joan, unable to get Sherlock to talk about his relapse, reports that Morland will soon arrive.

=== Season 4 (2015–16) ===
No. overall	No. in season	Title	Directed by	Written by	Original release date	U.S. viewers (millions)
73	1	"The Past Is Parent"	John Polson	Robert Doherty	November 5, 2015	5.58
Just before killing himself in front of Holmes, Jonathan Bloom hires him to discover what happened to his Honduran wife Alicia, who went missing in 2010. Bloom did kill two other women (drug addicts who did not survive rough sex), gives the location of their bodies, and kills himself. Another Honduran, Maribel Fonseca, vanished at the same time as Alicia. Years before, they, their families and others hired a "coyote" to smuggle them into the United States. However, he did not pay a drug cartel their customary fee for crossing their territory. The cartel killed nearly everyone; only Alicia and Maribel escaped. Both visited restaurant Novena Vida within days of each other. Maribel was searching for a tall, handsome man. The coyote survived the massacre, but does not fit that description, which actually describes Novena Vida's owner, Juan Murillo. In 2010, Alicia recognized him as the coyote. Maribel went to the restaurant to check. They tried to murder Murillo, who admits killing them in self-defence. He may not be convicted for those killings, but the New Jersey police serve an arrest warrant for other crimes. Meanwhile, the NYPD stops consulting Sherlock and Joan, and he may be charged with assault.
74	2	"Evidence of Things Not Seen"	Ron Fortunato	Jason Tracey	November 12, 2015	5.16
With the NYPD no longer employing him, Sherlock persuades FBI agent Gary Burke to hire him and Joan. They investigate a triple homicide at a neuroeconomics research facility, but chafe under Burke's close supervision. The researchers were working on a brainwashing technique for DARPA. All the hard drives containing the research were stolen. They meet DARPA Deputy Director Meher and Special Projects leader Alta Von See. It turns out that the researchers realised that their method did not work at all. Von See would be in line to succeed Meher. Von See used another device developed at DARPA, a sonic pressure shield, to incapacitate the victims, then shot them at her leisure. A pet lab rat died at the same time as the victims, also from the shield's effects. A streak of rubber from the base of her crutch by the device's storage closet implicates Von See. Morland offers to reinstate him and Joan at the NYPD. Sherlock eventually decides to take his father's offer, but Joan discovers that Morland bribed the DA into dropping the charges, and she warns him that she will not let him hurt Sherlock.
75	3	"Tag, You're Me"	Christine Moore	Bob Goodman	November 19, 2015	5.61
Two strangers who look like each other are murdered. Dorion Moll spoke with both by phone. Moll runs a website that finds people's doppelgängers, using a stolen and modified facial recognition system. Moll thinks that Countenance Technologies, the firm he stole the software from, wants to kill him; he previously escaped a masked man with a knife. One of the victims, Timothy Wagner, offered a third doppelgänger, Evan Farrow, $10,000 to take a DNA test, pretending to be Wagner. Farrow turned him down. Harold Cudlow, an Oriskany Falls University fraternity pledge, disappeared years before; his body was found in concrete when a building was being demolished. Cudlow fought against his killer; scrapings were found under his fingernails. Every member of the fraternity, including Wagner, was asked to submit to a DNA test. A policeman, Cudlow's brother, confesses to the two murders. However, Wagner's DNA does not match what was under Cudlow's fingernails. However, Countenance executive Curtis Tofano is on the original police list of suspects. Tofano also used Moll's site to hire a double to take his DNA test. Tofano strangled Cudlow to death and tried to kill Moll to cover his tracks. Meanwhile, Morland tries to reconcile with Sherlock, intending to stay in New York indefinitely.
76	4	"All My Exes Live in Essex"	Michael Pressman	Robert Hewitt Wolfe	November 26, 2015	5.32
Sherlock and Joan investigate a missing lab technician who works in the fertility clinic of the hospital where Joan used to work. The woman's skeleton is found stripped and assembled as an educational tool for medical students. Meanwhile, Joan meets with an old friend and finds out that a Detective Cortes has been asking questions about her. It turns out that the victim was in a group marriage with two doctors who reveal that she was dying of pancreatic cancer. It is then revealed that one of her husbands had been deliberately misdiagnosing people because he could create impressive cancer remission rates and raise his profits. She noticed when she was receiving chemotherapy in his clinic and challenged him, so he murdered her. When Joan confronts Cortes, the woman voices a dislike of consultants investigating cops and is suspicious about Sherlock and Joan's sudden return to the force. Joan has a boxing match with her as a way of approaching her as an equal.
77	5	"The Games Underfoot (Note: The title is a play on "The game is afoot," in Arthur Conan Doyle's The Return of Sherlock Holmes: "Come, Watson, come!' he [Holmes] cried. 'The game is afoot.")"	Alex Chapple	Arika Lisanne Mittman	December 10, 2015	5.00
The case of a dead unemployed archaeologist presents new mysteries, as the detectives find out that he was digging up an old landfill from the 1980s. The man was searching for Nottingham Knights, an old video game from the 1980s that was never released because of monumentally bad advance reviews. When it turns out a suspect already found and dug up the now-valuable video games years ago, Joan goes searching for another motive and finds that a chemical company was illegally dumping toxic chemicals. The landowner had the archaeologist killed to avoid blowing the multi-million dollar sale of the land and to avoid paying for the costly cleanup. Alfredo tells Joan that Sherlock has been avoiding him, possibly because of his connection to Alfredo's kidnapping. After Joan informs Sherlock of Alfredo's visit, Sherlock realizes that Alfredo has been going to more meetings than usual, due to his relapse, and offers his support.
78	6	"The Cost of Doing Business"	Aaron Lipstadt	Jason Tracey	December 17, 2015	5.92
A sniper shoots nine people, killing four, in the financial district. Morland offers his help with the case, knowing the sniper's identity. Although the shooting appears random, it is too precise, concealing the true target; Morland knows of a prior mass shooting with the same modus operandi, which benefitted a former client. Shooter-for-hire Gagnier was paid by a shell subsidiary of Dynastic Energies. Gagnier dies in a fall when the police attempt to apprehend him. The CEO of Dynastic Energies, Bill Wellstone, was having an affair with his lawyer's wife, Sarah; he discovered that she had left him for plumber Frank Bova, the true target of the shooting. Wellstone used a golf bag to smuggle the sniper's weapon past the security protecting the building, but left behind gun oil residue in the bag that implicates him. Over dinner with Morland, his contact at Interpol, Lukas, says that Morland has not been helping Sherlock out of the goodness of his heart, but rather is risking Sherlock's life. Lukas demands 5 million euros from Morland for keeping Sherlock in the dark about something. Morland orders Lukas to return to France, implying that he had Lukas's Interpol predecessor killed for a similar transgression.
79	7	"Miss Taken"	Guy Ferland	Tamara Jaron	January 7, 2016	6.71
Retired FBI agent Robert Underhill is killed. He was investigating the old, unsolved case of Mina Davenport. (Note: Ally Ioannides as Mina Davenport (also in "Miss Understood")) Mina was kidnapped at age eight and escaped her captor 14 months prior after 10 years in captivity and returned to her wealthy parents, Nancy and Richard Davenport. (Note: Raphael Sbarge as Richard Davenport) However, the woman claiming to be Mina is an impostor. The impostor claims that Richard killed Mina, and wants to gain control of Mina's trust fund. Later, Underhill's blood is found on a pedal in Mina's car. Richard confesses to Underhill's murder, but is shielding "Mina". However, the DNA test proves that Mina is the Davenports' daughter. The faker had found the real Mina, attacked her and cut off some of Mina's hair. When the impostor staged her "escape" from her imaginary kidnapper, she locked herself in a gas station restroom, then shaved off all her hair and planted Mina's for the police to find. The real Mina is found and reunited with Nancy. Meanwhile, Joan's stepfather Henry Watson (Note: John Heard as Henry Watson) writes a novel whose main characters are based on her and Sherlock.
80	8	"A Burden of Blood"	Christine Moore	Nick Thiel	January 14, 2016	5.98
Ellen Jacobs, two months pregnant despite having had a tubal ligation, is found suffocated by a plastic bag in her car. She was leaving a voice mail message when she was killed; her last words are "Oh, my God. No. Stop it! No!" Her husband is sterile. Ellen is the daughter of an imprisoned killer whose modus operandi matches her death. The father of her child is the realtor selling the Jacobs' house, whose mother was killed by Ellen's father; he is the prime suspect until he is attacked and hospitalised by the husband. The husband is arrested, but Ellen's brother Nolan is the true killer; the first "No" she said in the voice mail was actually her pet name for him. Ellen and Nolan had had an agreement not to pass on their father's genes, so he killed her after she refused to get an abortion. Meanwhile, Joan helps Bell study for the Sergeant's exam. Sherlock takes over Bell's tutelage and ascertains he does not want the promotion, but needs the pay raise to help his mother, who has lost her job. Joan gives Bell a tutoring "case study", which is actually a real case. This leads to his mother receiving most of a $40,000 bounty for locating a wanted fugitive.
81	9	"Murder Ex Machina"	Guy Ferland	Robert Hewitt Wolfe	January 21, 2016	6.33
Morland asks Joan to dine with him at a restaurant opening. Maxim Zolotov, a Russian oligarch, is shot and killed, and the two shooters are killed immediately afterward when their car is hacked. An analysis of the hacked code leads to Pentillion, a company creating automated vehicles, who admit that they were hacked by a rival company with which Zolotov was conducting business. Sherlock speaks with a Russian spy, who says that Zolotov was supposed to be on a government mission, not business. At dinner, Morland mentions that he knows that Mycroft is alive. He also says that he has been banking his own blood and asks Joan if she will check on a blood bank in New York. The involvement of diplomatic negotiations between Russia and Ukraine causes the case to be taken over by federal agents, but Sherlock continues searching for the instigator of the shooting, with Joan asking Morland for information on arms dealers making money off the war. The only one who would profit from the war continuing is Pentillion, by selling rocket engines while the Russian ones were off the market. Joan suspects that Morland was shot once before and may still be a target.
82	10	"Alma Matters"	Larry Teng	Bob Goodman	January 28, 2016	6.09
Morland downplays the danger surrounding him by saying that the assassin has been dealt with, a story Sherlock disbelieves. Two weeks later, Sherlock is turning up only empty leads. Sherlock corners Lukas. Startled by Lukas's hostility, Sherlock returns to Morland with the accusation that Morland suspects him of the shooting; Morland admits that Sherlock was, at one time, a suspect. Sherlock demands that he leave New York. Morland apologizes for his suspicions, explains the cause of Lukas's reaction and agrees to return to London. Sherlock says that Lukas's predecessor was spying on Morland, agreeing to investigate the case of Morland's shooting because of his reputation being besmirched. Meanwhile, Lily Cooper, the owner of a halfway house owned by Fairbridge, a for-profit university, suspects that a murder is more than it seems. A team of thieves witnessed the murder. Bell obtains a sketch of the murder suspect. Then Lily turns up dead as well. The man in the sketch is identified by the halfway house staff but, while he confesses to both murders, Bell finds that he has an alibi for Lily's. Fairbridge's CEO was using indebted ex-con students to commit crimes for him, including murder.
83	11	"Down Where the Dead Delight"	Jerry Levine	Jeffrey Paul King	February 4, 2016	6.23
A bomb hidden inside a body explodes in the morgue, destroying the evidence for several crimes. Sherlock discerns which case was the target of the bombing. Despite the lack of a body, the victim is identified as Janet, a woman who made a small profit selling drugs. A secret camera in Janet's kitchen reveals Toby, one of her clients, was spying on her. Toby's journals are found to be full of descriptions of ways to kill Janet, but his alibi leads Sherlock to suspect his father of killing her to protect his son. When confronted with the possibility of Toby going to jail, his father confesses. Detective Cortes unexpectedly asks for Joan's help finding an elusive suspect. Joan is frustrated when Cortes refuses to explain her questionable rationale. Sherlock suspects that Joan is being framed for an assault. Cortes reveals that she committed the assault as an act of justice — the man she attacked had violently assaulted a girl, leaving her with permanent brain damage — and requests Joan's help in the future, noting that she and Sherlock have taken similar actions in the past. Joan instead threatens to expose her if she ever does it again.
84	12	"A View with a Room"	John Polson	Richard C. Okie	February 11, 2016	6.10
A colleague of Gregson's wants some help infiltrating the headquarters of a drug-dealing biker gang. Undercover cop Ryan Dunning believes that the gang leader stores everything about the gang's operations on a computer in his office. Sherlock plans the heist, but the inside man dies before they can carry it out. The man's body camera records the moment of his death; he apparently grew impatient and tried to steal the computer by himself, but was discovered and shot. However, there are discrepancies between the recording and the real office; the video was faked at a different location. The man and his partner wanted to incite a police raid on the gang, but his partner doublecrossed him. When the police search the headquarters, the computer is sent to officer Lisa Hagen to crack the encryption. However, Hagen was actually Dunning's partner. She is interested in the gang's offshore bank accounts. She siphons off millions, but is caught. Meanwhile, Joan assists Fiona Helbron, who helped the duo on a recent case and wants to ensure that her new boss is not a criminal. Sherlock is interested in Fiona romantically. Fiona likes Sherlock and initiates a relationship.
85	13	"A Study in Charlotte (Note: The title is a play on the title of Arthur Conan Doyle's novel A Study in Scarlet.)"	Guy Ferland	Robert Hewitt Wolfe	February 18, 2016	5.95
A professor and some students die from consuming mushrooms tainted with a synthetic deathcap toxin. The professor's former associate, academic Alston C. Harper, says that although they had a falling out, they had made their peace. Another body, Harper's wife Charlotte Koenig, is later found. Koenig gave the professor the mushrooms. Koenig was the intended target and was producing counterfeit erectile dysfunction pills to buy real estate. The property is land a pharmaceutical company must have for a much-needed expansion. Koenig felt that they had stolen her biofuel process. Koenig would not give Harper a divorce (due to a dispute over textbook royalties). When she dropped her resistance, he became suspicious and hired a private investigator, who found out about Koenig's valuable property. Meanwhile, Joan discovers that the Brownstone's owner turned his residence into a short-term rental catering to partiers, as revenge for Sherlock and Joan's repeated disturbances of his peace over the years. After a fire breaks out, Joan uses the security cameras to prove that it was arson, thus ensuring the neighbor gets the insurance money. They also offer to pay for soundproofing and give him a jar of honey from Sherlock's bees.
86	14	"Who Is That Masked Man?"	Larry Teng	Jason Tracey	February 25, 2016	5.82
Three members of a Chinese triad are murdered. Hoping to prevent a gang war, Gregson turns to Sherlock and Joan. Sherlock deduces the victims let their killer into an arcade late at night. The crimes are traced to a mortician who, using his skill at creating lifelike masks for his disfigured clients, disguised himself as an old woman the triad members trusted. The mortician is terminally ill and, masquerading as the triad's leader, orders the head of an assisted living facility (who is involved in a triad scam) to funnel the fraudulently obtained funds to a new bank account in order to provide for his family. Sherlock and Joan scam their way into the house of the daughter of Morland's lover Sabine because Sherlock suspects that Sabine was involved in the assassination attempt that cost her her life. Furious, Morland insists to Sherlock that Sabine's death was his full responsibility. However, Morland gives Sherlock access to her e-mail account, revealing that it was hacked by a Russian hitman who now resides in a super-maximum prison in Russia. Morland also provides Sherlock with his mother's medical records, revealing to him that he was not the first addict in the family.
87	15	"Up to Heaven and Down to Hell"	John Polson	Tamara Jaron	March 3, 2016	5.85
Rosalyn Graham, a wealthy octogenarian, falls from her penthouse flat, dying and killing the man she lands on. An ottoman is found next to the railing of her balcony, but she did not have the strength to move it there; it was put there to make it look like a suicide. Graham leaves her estate to her dog, which would tie her estate up for years while heirs contest it. Billionaire real estate mogul William Hull (Note: See "Terra Pericolosa".) is buying up properties' air rights to build a 63-story edifice designed by architect Malcolm Busquet. Graham's death deprives him of the air rights to her building. Busquet or one of his staff made a career-killing design error - an average wind would topple it - and tried to cover it up by killing three people to ensure that the project could go ahead at a shorter, safe height, 40 stories. Gregson is involved with a disgraced former police officer, Paige Cowan. (Note: Virginia Madsen as Paige Cowan) Paige breaks off the relationship after Joan accidentally runs into them at a restaurant. They eventually make up after she reveals that the reason she broke up with Gregson is that she has MS.
88	16	"Hounded (Note: This is an adaptation of The Hound of the Baskervilles.)"	Ron Fortunato	Robert Hewitt Wolfe	March 10, 2016	5.64
Venture capitalist Charles Baskerville is struck and killed by a truck while fleeing for his life from what an unreliable witness describes as a large glowing animal. Charles' brother Henry (Note: Tom Everett Scott as Henry Baskerville) believes that it might have been murder. The animal breaks into Henry's mansion while he is on the phone with Sherlock; Sherlock deduces in time that the animal is actually a robot (developed for the US Army) and instructs Henry on how to save himself. The robot ends up falling into Henry's empty pool. The invention is traced to Stapleton Innovations. The CEO turns out to be the Baskervilles' sole surviving relative Roger; he stands to inherit a family trust if both Charles and Henry die. However, he does not need the money; he offers to commit a felony, which would disqualify him from inheriting. Sherlock suspects an unknown illegitimate relative is behind it all. He gets Henry to "kill" Roger. When the relative, an employee at Stapleton Innovations, steps forward to claim the trust, she is shocked to see Roger very much alive. Meanwhile, Dr. Eugene Hawes' work is suffering from the psychological effects of the killing of a girlfriend, (Note: In "Down Where the Dead Delight".) and he is self-medicating.
89	17	"You've Got Me, Who's Got You?"	Seith Mann	Paul Cornell	March 20, 2016	5.28
A comic book superhero impersonator who fights actual criminals is found dead. This leads the investigation to the publisher and the creator's grandson, Al Baxter, who is the editor of that comic. Baxter constantly voices his dismay over the fact that his grandfather was screwed out of his rights in the 1940s, irritating his co-workers. Baxter knew and supported the impersonator. Ironically, the impersonator was killed trying to stop Baxter from murdering his co-workers at a meeting at a restaurant with executives interested in making a movie about the superhero. Morland, suspicious after an important deal falls through, asks Joan to determine if there is a mole in his organization. Sherlock cautions Joan by telling her he suspects that Morland freed the Russian hitman (seen in Who Is That Masked Man?) from prison. Joan lies and tells Morland she could not find a mole, but then blackmails the mole to report to her.
90	18	"Ready or Not"	Christine Moore	Bob Goodman	March 27, 2016	5.16
A survivalist doctor goes missing, leaving behind evidence that he was selling prescription drugs to dealers. When his body turns up, the investigation turns to the Keep, a deluxe shelter for wealthy survivalists. Sherlock exposes the Keep as a scam, determining that the victim attempted to cover his drug dealing by stealing the shelter's stock of medications, only to discover that they did not exist. The man's business partner, who helped him break into the shelter, killed him and framed the survivalists to keep their practice from going under. Sherlock has been treating Fiona as someone special, but his uncharacteristic slow approach only leads her to feel like she is a problem for him to solve, so she breaks up with him. He explains that he has been even less successful at personal relationships than her (one lover to her two) and was trying so hard because he wants to make things work. She reconsiders and tells him she wants to have sex, right then and there.
91	19	"All In"	Aaron Lipstadt	Kelly Wheeler	April 10, 2016	6.38
An illegal high roller poker game is robbed, the look-out murdered, the dealer Sofia Darrow injured, and the organizer of the game, Lin Wen, comes to Sherlock and Joan for help after being framed for it all. Lin claims she knew Mycroft well, getting her off on the wrong foot with Joan, but Sherlock takes the case. Interviewing the players leads to footage of the game, from which Sherlock deduces Darrow and the thieves staged it all. NSA Agent McNally intervenes. Darrow, aka Szofi Demir, is a spy who staged the robbery to secretly copy (steal) a key belonging to poker player Mateo Pena. The copied key allows access to a secure computer server room at Semper Apex, Pena's firm, that hosts U.N. diplomatic communications. Joan confronts Lin with the truth that they are half-sisters.
92	20	"Art Imitates Art"	Ron Fortunato	Arika Lisanne Mittman	April 10, 2016	6.04
Exiting a gym late at night, Phoebe Elliot spots a car she thinks is her ride share, but is shot and killed. Sherlock and Joan come across a selfie the victim took, which was later enlarged and sold as "art". The art gallery where the piece was exhibited was broken into, and several works were stolen, but not the selfie. However, Sherlock notices that the selfie has been replaced with another with some background details removed, details which seem to provide an alibi for a man imprisoned for the murder of Marissa Kagan. Sherlock now suspects that Elliot was killed because she spotted the alteration. Kagan was having an affair with a married woman; when Kagan pressed her lover to get a divorce, she was killed by her lover's wife. The killer wanted to turn herself in, but her wife and Kagan's lover, Assistant District Attorney Christina Pullman, talked her out of it and proceeded to murder Elliot to cover up the first killing. Lin, Joan's half-sister, angrily tells her to stay away from her family after Joan reaches out to Lin's mother. Later, however, Lin reconsiders, and reconciles with Joan.
93	21	"Ain't Nothing Like the Real Thing"	Jeremy Webb	Nick Thiel and Jeffrey Paul King	April 17, 2016	5.51
During an apparent carjacking gone wrong, both the driver and the carjacker are shot dead. However, many details do not fit that story; for example, the alleged carjacker was left-handed, but the gun ended up next to his right hand. It turns out that the carjacker was actually a hitman hired by the driver's partner in a struggling business. The partner was being pressured by the target to sell some seemingly worthless property. The partner, however, knew that it held rare "old-growth ginseng" worth tens of millions. The driver and the hitman decided instead to stage a phony murder to blackmail the partner. The driver's wife confronted him during the staged scene and killed both men, having found out that her husband was planning to abandon her and start a new life in Tahiti. When she shot her husband, the recoil knocked her hand back against the car door, dislodging the diamond from her ring. The diamond remained undetected amid the shattered window glass, until Sherlock figured out what happened. Meanwhile, multiple people die during an armed robbery in a diner, one of them is Emil Kurtz, Joan's mole in Morland's organization.
94	22	"Turn It Upside Down"	Lucy Liu	Bob Goodman	April 24, 2016	5.15
Sherlock is furious with Joan because she did not inform him about her recruitment/blackmailing of a person in Morland's organization. The two of them suspect Morland of ordering the assassination in the diner, but the evidence points elsewhere after the suspect confesses to both it and another murder for hire by the same person two weeks earlier. The first victim, Patricia Naylor, was a psychiatrist who had devised an online survey called the Depravity and Atrocity Numeration Test (DANTE), which asked takers to choose the least terrible of sets of disgusting options to help set sentencing guidelines for heinous crimes. However, Sherlock suspects the survey has been used to instead identify psychopaths who can be recruited. He discovers that Naylor's lab assistant was selling test results to a person she initially thought was with the CIA. The names used by the contact, two holders of the chair of mathematics at Cambridge, alert Sherlock of the involvement of his longtime adversary, Moriarty.
95	23	"The Invisible Hand"	Guy Ferland	Robert Doherty and Jason Tracey	May 1, 2016	5.45
Sherlock deduces that someone has taken charge of Moriarty's organization. Morland's office is bombed by the Russian hitman. This leads Sherlock to economics professor Joshua Vikner. (Note: Tony Curran as Joshua Vikner) Not only is he the head of Moriarty's organization, he is also the father to her daughter. New evidence on the hitman surfaces, after which Morland appears at the brownstone trying unsuccessfully to coerce Sherlock into giving up the name of the caretaker. The Russian hitman is arrested, but does not share any useful information. Sherlock notices corrosion on his belt and a distinct smell, identifying what propellant was used in the bombing. This points to the upstate theft of a pesticide barrel and a missing person. Meanwhile, Vikner summons Sherlock to discuss a possible truce with Morland. However, Sherlock says that Morland will only be satisfied with his death. As the team prepares for an interview with the DA, the prisoner is assassinated in a murder-suicide by a rookie cop who turns out to be one of the psychopaths flagged in the DANTE survey. When Sherlock and Joan return home, they find a bomb identical to the first one.
96	24	"A Difference in Kind"	John Polson	Jason Tracey and Robert Doherty	May 8, 2016	5.46
Sherlock disarms the bomb and deduces that it was not arranged by Vikner, but by a rival who wants to frame him and make him the target of Moriarty's vengeance; Moriarty has ordered her organization to not harm Sherlock and Joan. Sherlock and Joan find out with help from Morland that the bomber is connected to an Iranian diplomat in the organization, Hashemi. She reveals that she and others wanted someone with more finesse to take charge - Morland. However, Vikner disposed of his inside rivals and targeted Morland. She also reveals the enormity of the world-wide organization. Sherlock, Joan and Morland frame Vikner for a federal crime, but he vanishes, tipped off by a contact inside the FBI. Morland, to protect Sherlock, dismisses his security detail and meets Vikner. However, Hashemi's people kill Vikner. Morland meets Sherlock on the brownstone's rooftop, revealing that he has taken over leadership of the organization because it can only be dismantled from within and that it was the only way to guarantee he would not lose his son. He also promises that the organization will no longer have a presence in New York and prepares to return to London.

=== Season 5 (2016–17) ===
No. overall	No. in season	Title	Directed by	Written by	Original release date	U.S. viewers (millions)
97	1	"Folie à Deux"	Christine Moore	Robert Doherty and Jeffrey Paul King	October 2, 2016	6.03
An IED hidden in a soccer ball kills a man; this is similar to a string of explosions from half a decade earlier. While Sherlock and Joan are briefed at the scene, Sherlock notices someone suspicious looking and chases him. Sherlock is knocked down by a car, but the suspect leaves a hand print and is found in the system. It turns out he was in prison for vehicular manslaughter. Sherlock likes him as the suspect, but some things do not add up. Joan asks Shinwell Johnson, one of her last patients as a surgeon and also someone who was in the same prison as the suspect, for information. He points her to the suspect's best friend in prison. Eventually, this friend admits to being responsible for the earlier bombings. Sherlock figures out that they were working together in a scheme to help the first suspect, a real estate developer, win a very valuable contract by targeting the neighborhood of a rival's site for a massive new entertainment center. Sherlock encourages Joan to help Shinwell. Shinwell hides a gun when Joan knocks on his door.
98	2	"Worth Several Cities"	Guy Ferland	Robert Hewitt Wolfe	October 16, 2016	5.21
Gang leader Halcon (Note: Jon Huertas as Halcon) wants Sherlock to discover who killed the gang's favorite smuggler. Sherlock offers to do so in exchange for the identity of a drug dealer selling poisoned drugs. Halcon instead has the dealer killed. The smuggler's murderer was after the Imperial Jade Seal of China, a valuable artifact, which in actuality is believed to have been carved in the year 221 BC, 221B of course being Sherlock’s address number. Representatives of both mainland China and Taiwan want the seal, the latter offering Sherlock $50 million for it. While examining the site of the auction for the seal, Sherlock notices two indentations on a metal rail under a garage door; they come from an armored luxury car. This leads to Wayne Vachs, (Note: Ron Rifkin as Wayne Vachs) the CEO of a large energy company which faces government fines that will ruin it. Vachs won the auction, but did not have the money to pay for it, so he had the smuggler killed. He planned to give the seal back to the mainland Chinese in exchange for a concession on a recently discovered Chinese mineral deposit, worth billions. Sherlock threatens to reveal Vach's identity to Halcon unless he confesses to the police. Meanwhile, Shinwell asks Joan to locate his teenage daughter, with whom he lost touch while being incarcerated.
99	3	"Render, and Then Seize Her"	Alex Chapple	Jason Tracey	October 23, 2016	5.39
A murder at a clothing-optional retreat leads to the investigation of a week-old kidnapping for ransom; the kidnapped woman's husband, the head of a post-production company, had not reported it due to fear for her life. Sherlock investigates the husband, discovering that he stands to make a fortune from a software program's invention, which manipulates video footage. The recording of the wife's kidnapping seems to use the software. Eventually the wife escapes her kidnappers, but Sherlock realizes she faked the kidnapping to gain enough sympathy from her husband, who was looking into divorcing her, that he would wait to divorce her and let their prenuptial agreement expire. This would then net her half of his fortune (including the profits from the new video program) rather than the negligible amount specified under the prenup. Meanwhile, Sherlock learns that Gregson's girlfriend Paige (Note: From the episode "Up to Heaven and Down to Hell".) is going broke because she has lost her insurance and he tries to persuade Gregson to marry her for financial reasons.
100	4	"Henny Penny, the Sky Is Falling"	John Polson	Bob Goodman	October 30, 2016	4.80
Russell Cole, an investment analyst at the firm Barrett White Capital, is murdered. The killer took Cole's laptop. Cole's boss, was Mitch Barrett. Barrett's wife Laurie was having an affair with Cole. Laurie provided a secluded cabin near Bear Mountain where Cole worked on projects. Cole had written a controversial astronomy article about the identification of asteroids that are potential threats to human existence. Cole's claim convinced NASA to cancel a $500 million infrared telescope project. However, Cole's paper is actually a deceitful manipulation. Grant Huber, a congresswoman's science advisor and Cole's secret research partner, was a lobbyist for asteroid mining companies and was being bribed to ensure that government decisions would benefit them. The delay or loss of government funding for asteroid research would benefit the mining interests. Huber would also profit from buying stock in the contractors' companies. When Cole demanded more of a cut, Huber killed him. Oil from poison ivy from Cole's laptop got on Huber's office couch. Sherlock informs Huber that they may manage to match the DNA to the poison ivy growing near Cole's cabin. If not, someone who ate at the diner where Huber and Cole regularly communicated secretly will probably identify him.
101	5	"To Catch a Predator Predator"	Guy Ferland	Tamara Jaron	November 6, 2016	4.68
When Damien Novak, a vigilante who outed dating site sexual predators and publicly shamed them, is shot to death, Sherlock and Joan look into the men he humiliated. Among Damien's targets was Shane Fitzhugh, who fled to Indonesia after he was publicly shamed. Shane had engaged in many past sexual abuses and Sherlock realizes that one of his victims is Molly Parsons, (Note: Conor Leslie as Molly Parsons) an employee at the dating site Damien used. Molly admits she killed Damien out of anger because his actions caused Shane to leave the country before he could be arrested. Afterwards, Sherlock arranges to have Shane framed for drug possession. Shinwell, meanwhile, cannot find work because of his criminal record. Joan suggests training him as a detective, against Sherlock's advice.
102	6	"Ill Tidings"	Ron Fortunato	Jeffrey Paul King	November 13, 2016	5.45
A chef and several patrons are poisoned after dining on foie gras containing snake venom. The diners were all members of the IAO group, the Internet's first line of defense. The sole survivor, a vegetarian, says that there are many more defenses, as well as replacements for his deceased colleagues. A video is released, claiming credit for the poisoning and threatening to target the New York Stock Exchange. The NYSE shuts down operations for a security check by outside experts, allowing the heist of three paintings worth $60 million. Sherlock has an art forger create copies of the stolen works, and their "recovery" is reported in the media. From darknet chatter claiming the recovery was faked, a robber – one of the security experts who checked the NYSE system – is identified, but turns up dead, bitten by a coastal taipan. His murderous partner is a cook who worked for the chef. The cook took the precaution of injecting himself with small doses of the venom to build up an immunity, so he could "milk" the taipan; this proved a wise move, as he was bitten, though it later proved to be his undoing as well.
103	7	"Bang Bang Shoot Chute"	Jerry Levine	Celeste Chan Wolfe	November 20, 2016	5.01
Sherlock and Joan search for two murderers after a base jumper is shot out of the sky by one killer and has his parachute sabotaged by another. The victim had bought a small plane and was smuggling people into the USA across the Canadian border. Both murderers' motives stem from the victim having an affair with an Afghan woman. His wife sabotaged the parachute, while the woman's brother shot him in an honor killing. Meanwhile, Joan takes drastic measures to try to ensure that Shinwell is not drawn back into a life of crime after her half-sister Lin sees him with a member of his old gang.
104	8	"How the Sausage Is Made"	Michael Pressman	Mark Hudis	November 27, 2016	4.95
Sherlock has been lying to Joan about attending recovery meetings. Meanwhile, a man's death is caused by eating poisoned sausage made of human meat. The second victim is Joaquin "Joaq" Pereya, a researcher who made a breakthrough in the artificial meat industry. A rival company hired a father-daughter team of assassins. Confronted with evidence for various murders committed by the pair, the daughter admits to eight killings, but denies murdering Joaq. That hit was called off after Joaq's product was tested and classified by the Food and Drug Administration as a meat substitute, not meat. However, the data was doctored to produce that result. The motive was to get it recognized as non-meat, as that would bypass the kosher and halal meat restrictions and open up a vast market. The CEO and a researcher at Joaq's company did the killing and data tampering, respectively, after Joaq refused to fake the data himself. The kosher and halal certifying boards refuse to recognize the artificial meat as pareve (neither meat nor dairy) unless Joaq's murderer is convicted. The researcher is offered an immunity deal, as he is only guilty of data tampering. He takes it, and the CEO is arrested.
105	9	"It Serves You Right to Suffer"	Aidan Quinn	Kelly Wheeler	December 11, 2016	4.73
Los Espectros gang member Ricky Morales is murdered with a vintage Nambu pistol, but Shinwell's .38 pistol is found near the scene, and he matches the description of a suspect fleeing the scene. Shinwell had been recruited as an FBI CI by Agent Calvin Whitlock to return to his gang, the SBK (South Bronx Killas). Whitlock, asked to subpoena the .38 to save Shinwell being implicated, refuses, claiming treachery from a prior CI by which he was stripped of authority to recruit more CIs. Since he recruited without authorization, Whitlock disavows Shinwell. Whitlock killed another CI, Ricky, who wanted to quit, and threatened to expose Whitlock after realizing that he had used Ricky's information to rob Los Espectros. Whitlock used CI intelligence to rob four gangs with ex-FBI partner in crime, Lionel Trafoya, who was wounded during the last robbery. Trafoya is interrogated, and his blood is tested for a match to the robbery scene. Whitlock commits suicide after phoning Joan to come by and pick up the evidence. Trafoya refuses to cooperate, so Shinwell's role as a CI cannot be confirmed. Sherlock breaks into Evidence and wipes Shinwell's fingerprints from the .38 before it can be tested.
106	10	"Pick Your Poison"	Jeremy Webb	Bob Goodman	December 18, 2016	5.08
Joan has her DEA number and identity stolen, leading to the discovery of two dead bodies, those of a rheumatologist who stole her identity and the mother of one of her patients. The crooked doctor was illegally writing drug prescriptions using five stolen identities. Joan realizes the patient had been secretly poisoned by his mother all his life for the attention she got to bask in. The doctor had stumbled upon this when the mother contacted one of her stolen identities and gave an entirely different medical history for her son. The doctor informed her patient. The patient murdered his mother as revenge and the doctor because she would have guessed he was the matricide. Meanwhile, Sherlock deals with an unwanted gift from Shinwell while trying to prevent Shinwell from possibly ending up dead - he proposes he and Joan train Shinwell to be a criminal informant.
107	11	"Be My Guest"	Maja Vrvilo	Jason Tracey	January 8, 2017	5.14
While wrapping up a murder investigation, Sherlock discovers evidence of a woman being held prisoner for years by Ryan Decker and races to track her down before she is disposed of by her captor. Decker's ex-wife is not surprised, saying she divorced him after catching him watching perverted porn. Blood found at a beach is feared to be that of the captive but is not. The NYPD rescue a captive, but she is not the one Sherlock is looking for, but rather a woman taken only a few months before. Joan notices that the brand of soy milk in the fridge at that site is the same as that preferred by the ex-wife. The couple were working together. The ex-wife is arrested before she could dispose of the captive. She had murdered her ex-husband at the beach. Meanwhile, Joan discovers that Shinwell is not taking his informant training seriously, opting to spend his time on a shady drug deal that could get him promoted within his old gang.
108	12	"Crowned Clown, Downtown Brown"	Michael Slovis	Jordan Rosenberg	January 15, 2017	4.36
Clown Dale Schmitt is killed. Near the murder site, there is a manhole cover, below is the pipeline delivering New York City's drinking water. The news sparks panic buying of bottled water. However, the virus introduced into the water only causes diarrhea. Virologist Raymond Thorpe created it before fleeing the country. Gio Bianchi is a suspect, as his construction company had repeatedly won the contract to build a water filtration plant for the city, a contract that would only be implemented if NYC's disinfection methods are no longer enough. But the one to gain immediately from the superbug is Wendell Hecht, Vice President of Water Integrity at the Department of Environmental Protection (DEP), who holds the patent for the only home water filter recommended by the DEP. Since it would take years to build the filtration plant, Hecht would have become rich. Hecht hired Thorpe to contaminate the water supply. Schmitt saw him doing it, so Thorpe killed him. Meanwhile, Bell gets provoked into a fight by the ex-husband of his girlfriend (an assistant district attorney). It is actually a scheme to get her removed from a particular case.
109	13	"Over a Barrel"	Guy Ferland	Jeffrey Paul King	January 29, 2017	5.44
Jack Brunelle, the father of a now-dead assault victim takes a diner hostage to force Sherlock and Joan to solve his son's murder; the police and Sherlock had brushed him off when he tried to get them to investigate. He gives them until midnight to find the culprit, as that is when the statute of limitations runs out. The first hostage Brunelle plans to execute is the detective who botched the initial investigation. With Joan remaining behind as an additional hostage and having hours before the gunman's deadline, Sherlock works with Bell. Apparently, the Shoreline 99s, after losing a turf war with a rival gang, switched from smuggling cocaine to maple syrup, using trucks and barrels. Connor Brunelle was a security guard at the warehouse and was mugged by Shoreline 99s thug Frank Trimble to stop him being on duty on the night of the smuggling. However, Sherlock makes his breakthrough after the deadline apparently expires. However, he finds television footage showing Trimble at a hockey game in Montreal; time spent outside the United States does not count towards the statute of limitations (tolling), so Trimble can still be brought to justice.
110	14	"Rekt in Real Life"	John Polson	Robert Hewitt Wolfe	February 19, 2017	5.08
eSports agent and commentator O.G. Pwnzr is attacked while live-streaming. His body is found in a hotel room, after being tortured for the location of Inuk Marcel Otolik, aka Tendu, who recently signed with ProFine Peripherals' eSports team. Animal activist Rayna Carno has been working to ban seal hunting. After Tendu posted a social media photo of himself eating seal meat to promote seal hunting as a vital part of Inuit culture, Carno posted threats. Carno later negotiated a deal in which Tendu would oppose commercial hunting, while Carno would support less extensive Inuit hunting. Law firm Mather & Kline was hired to secure Inuit land to build ports on. Tendu and his girlfriend are rescued from Kurt Godwyn, the law firm's "fixer". Godwyn's gun was the one used to beat Owen. Carno's lawyer Lundquist is arrested for helping Carno pressure Tendu's village to end seal hunting, leaving them destitute; thus more willing to sell their land. Tendu's photos turned public opinion against Carno, and money he sent to Maniitok enabled the village elders to resist selling; Lundquist ordered the hit on Tendu. Godwyn implicates her. Shinwell trades SBK-controlled street corners to end a gang leader's harassment of his daughter.
111	15	"Wrong Side of the Road"	Jennifer Lynch	Robert Doherty and Jason Tracey	March 5, 2017	4.26
Cy Durning supposedly dies of a heart attack, but Kitty Winter warns Sherlock, Durning was murdered and he and she are targets. They had worked a London case in which Eli Kotite was convicted of a fatal hit-and-run while driving drunk. Released after four years, his defense lawyer Tom Saunders, the judge, and prosecutor Durning died, supposedly of natural causes. They suspect Kotite hired a hit-man, having been maimed and disabled in prison by resentful inmates, therefore unable to commit murder himself. Durning's body is exhumed and incinerated; the culprit's gray-red hair, indicating a Caucasian. Sherlock draws a sketch from memory of the henchman at Kotite's private club. They discover M.E. Dr. Wilkerson was bribed, insisting Durning died of natural causes. Kotite phones Sherlock, saying he knows the real killer, but Kotite is murdered. FBI agents and soldiers raid the brownstone, led by DIA Agent Anson Gephardt (the red-haired suspect), who specializes in Middle Eastern affairs. Meanwhile, Joan discovers that Kitty has an infant son, Archie.
112	16	"Fidelity"	Christine Moore	Jason Tracey and Robert Doherty	March 12, 2017	4.50
Rogue DIA agent Gephardt admits to the murders (from "Wrong Side of the Road"), but threatens Sherlock to end his investigation or be linked to Morland's crimes. Kate Durning gives Joan audio recordings of Cy's court hearings at Kotite's pre-trial, in which Gephardt's murder victims had heard Tom Saunders ranting about conspiracies, including a secret plot to end Venezuelan democracy. Lawyer Sydney Garber reveals Saunders was a paranoid schizophrenic, but two days before Kotite's murder, a 50-pound cyclonite toilet bomb exploded in the Caracas National Library, narrowly missing the Venezuelan president. A document proves Garber knew about the bombing before it occurred. Gephardt tries to kill Garber, who tells the NYPD, his college roommate Alberto is the head of Venezuelan intelligence. Gephardt had hired him to acquire Fidel Castro's secret files. Garber provides his USB copy, which is slightly different from the Fidel Files Gephardt uploaded to the internet, containing video of Iran's nuclear weapons program. After raiding Gephardt's family home, Holmes provides NSA Agent McNally proof that Gephardt faked video of Iran possessing nuclear warheads in order to instigate a war between the U.S. and Iran. Kitty asks Joan and Sherlock to be Archie's godparents.
113	17	"The Ballad of Lady Frances"	Aaron Lipstadt	Bob Goodman and Jordan Rosenberg	March 19, 2017	4.28
Drywaller Darren Azoff is seized by D'Agostino and Reese Vennek, who tortures Azoff, demanding to know where "the Lady Frances" is. Azoff denies knowledge and Vennek kills him. Audio of the shooting is monitored by Cosmo Dellis and recorded by BulletPoint, a surveillance device, activated by gunshot, of which the pilot is politically debated between the mayor and Councilman Slessinger, who is running for mayor on a 'be tougher on crime' platform. NYPD mounts a search for the kidnapped "Frances." At Azoff's mistress Marjorie's home, they realize "Lady Frances" is a vintage guitar originally owned by Eric Clapton, worth $5 million. Azoff stole it from Herman Wolf, (Note: Meat Loaf as Herman Wolf) who hired Vennek to retrieve it. Vennek betrays D'Agostino, and admits killing Azoff but denies killing Cosmo, who was beaten to death after Cosmo used the BulletPoint recording to steal the guitar for himself. Thea Moser reports Cosmo who created fake gunshot incidents for months. They arrest Councilman Slessinger for murdering Cosmo, who he used to manipulate his election campaign. Meanwhile, an attempt on Shinwell's life is made by Damon, in revenge for a shooting death from Shinwell's prior thug life.
114	18	"Dead Man's Tale"	Alex Chapple	Tamara Jaron	March 26, 2017	5.16
Xavier buys an abandoned storage unit's contents, finding the corpse of Manhattan Public Administrator's Office employee Travis Unger, who stole from people who died intestate. Also found, is the 18th-century seafaring equipment chest of Captain Emerson Barker, aka the pirate Black Peter, whose missing captain's log included the location of the gold-laden sunken Spanish galleon, Santa Leticia. Unger had offered Lars Vestergaard half in return for salvaging it. Lars claims he rejected the offer, having already obtained salvage rights from the Admiralty courts. But someone beat him to the treasure; Farhan Al-Asmari admits to salvaging it, after buying the log on the dark web. They learn from a marine archaeologist, who once sabotaged Lars' salvage equipment, that the Seville archives show there was no treasure on the Santa Leticia. It leads to Lars' arrest for defrauding his investors, and killing Unger after realizing he'd owe his investors ten times the treasure's value if it was actually found. Meanwhile, Jameel's murder is probed, prompting Shinwell to ambush and beat Sherlock, revealing that SBK manipulated the killing. Shinwell insists he'll "take SBK down...and anybody who get in my way gonna get hurt."
115	19	"High Heat"	Michael Hekmat	Kelly Wheeler	April 16, 2017 (Note: Aired a week earlier in Canada at 7 pm Eastern/Pacific; the originally planned April 9 airing in the USA was preempted by golf.)	4.29
Two murder victims' remains are found illicitly burned alive in a crematorium, including PI Fred Kirby, whose numerous restraining orders cause Sherlock to examine a 1987 shooting spree upon new citizens at their swearing-in ceremony. Virginia Spivey organizes a memorial, but Kirby secretly swapped bloodstained Constitution pamphlets, to have a lab assistant perform DNA tests, seeking a paternity match to Carter Gibson, who's convinced the shooter was not his father. Sherlock realizes Kirby and Carter were killed by blows from a ball-shaped award Carter received for work related to his Charcot–Marie–Tooth disease. Virginia's son Houston is called to the Precinct: Carter had announced evidence that he was not the son of the courthouse shooter, but it's also revealed that the Spivey family had CMT. Having CMT jeopardizes Houston's career as a college baseball star pitcher, expected to gain a major league contract. A loud bang that the neighbors heard was caused by Houston who, after killing with the award, threw it the remarkable distance of 245 feet with spot-on accuracy into a metal dumpster, where NYPD finds it covered in the blood of both victims, and having Houston's fingerprints.
116	20	"The Art of Sleights and Deception"	Ron Fortunato	Mark Hudis	April 23, 2017	4.47
Magician Claude Rysher dies performing a bullet catch with a poisoned bullet. They question rival magician Angela Newsome, and banker Keating, who paid his poker debt with information regarding the 1963 book The Art of Sleights and Deception. A possible motive is a two-million dollar prize to whoever identifies the real name of its author, who published under the pseudonym Walker Elmsley. But Farraday Books division head Ballard Clifton readily reveals it's Albert Lange, his grandfather. Rysher also bought a rare Nazi anatomy book by a concentration camp doctor, beating Mr. Frye at auction. Sherlock examines Frye's replacement copy, solving the case; Lange illustrated both books, and Clifton killed Rysher to conceal that Sleights and Deception was written by a war criminal, which would have ruined Clifton's company. Meanwhile, an irate motorist, Gorham, raises accusations of inappropriate behavior, jeopardizing Bell's career. After discovering Chantal's ex-husband Roy Booker arranged the bogus complaint, both Booker and Gorham are charged. Later, Bell finds his girlfriend Chantal's bloody body.
117	21	"Fly into a Rage, Make a Bad Landing"	Guy Ferland	Bob Goodman	April 30, 2017	4.79
Chantal is brutally beaten and hospitalized (after events in "The Art of Sleights and Deception"). Bell is convinced Chantal's assailant is her ex-husband Roy Booker. While urine found on Chantal's bed matches Booker's DNA, his alibi is verified. They find Booker shot dead, an apparent suicide. Attorney Ted Winthrop, Booker's boss at Sawyer Winthrop Rose (specializing in finding divorcing spouses' hidden assets), implicates Fyodor Ukhov, who's hiding $20M from Winthrop's client Lara Ukhov. Fyodor admits detecting Booker's surveillance and hitting his car, which explains his fingerprints. Sherlock injures Fyodor to prevent his flight to the Caymans, and to save Bell's career. They confront Fyodor's PI, Joseph Tommolino, who didn't provide details on Booker and Chantal until after the assault. They discover Booker used herbs to pass a drug test, and a client list with $100,000 in the bank. They uncover that Winthrop lied to his clients, low-balling how much money their husbands hid so he could steal the difference. Booker discovered Winthrop's scheme, extorting him for a cut. Learning of Booker's issues with Chantal, Winthrop attacked Chantal and staged Booker's suicide. He ordered his staff to take drug tests to obtain Booker's incriminating urine from the lab tech.
118	22	"Moving Targets"	Lucy Liu	Robert Hewitt Wolfe	May 7, 2017	4.22
When a small town police chief is killed while participating in a reality TV show where all the contestants "hunt" their assigned targets, the team initially suspects her current target, a former child soldier turned doctor from Africa, but soon realizes that the deceased had uncovered a complex network of police bribery and corruption. Meanwhile, Shinwell recruits Joan's help in exposing the role a member of the SBK played in another murder so that he can rise up in the ranks of the gang. He also provides her with a written confession of his earlier crimes, so that she may turn him in whenever she thinks best. Joan receives a text from Shinwell and discovers him dead in his apartment.
119	23	"Scrambled"	Christine Moore	Jason Tracey	May 14, 2017	4.43
Shinwell's back-stabbing murder angers Joan; Sherlock determines to finish taking down Shinwell's former gang, SBK. Detective Guzman indicates SBK's leader Bonzi Folsom rarely leaves his guarded apartment. No one knows how he communicates with underlings. Bonzi's estranged half-brother, Tyus Wilcox seems like a legitimate businessman. Hoping to end NYPD's investigation, Bonzi reveals Shinwell's killer is Tall Boy, who willingly accepts his arrest and imprisonment. Sherlock notices Bonzi's Enigma machine, and Joan cracks his window-blind signals by which he communicates his cipher key to unscramble online instructions. But NYPD's raid on SBK's next drug deal fails; Bonzi deletes his social media, precluding future stings. From Bonzi's past communications, they link contract killings of rival company personnel, tying Tyus to SBK. Confronted by Sherlock and Joan, Tyus refutes that he's SBK's real leader, but reacts haptically to Carol Logan's murder. Connecting Carol to Bonzi, they obtain a DNA warrant, but find Bonzi in a vegetative state, having snorted bleach-laced cocaine. They suspect Tyus somehow supplied it to silence Bonzi. Throughout, Sherlock is distracted by a separate strangulation case, in which in his mind manifests his mother, May.
120	24	"Hurt Me, Hurt You"	John Polson	Robert Doherty and Jeffrey Paul King	May 21, 2017	4.11
SBK gang members at an outdoor party plan to kill Joan when Mara Tres gang members ambush and kill them, two women, and two children; ten in all. The NYPD prepares for a gang war. Mara Tres' leader Julio "Halcon" Zelaya shows Sherlock the murdered body of his sister Carmen, with a video of her reading a message implicating SBK. But Carmen's roommate Tanya, who witnessed her abduction, doubts the kidnapper, who lacked tattoos, was a gang member. In return for immunity, Tyus provides ADA Nelson Lewis information on SBK, including every gang hit, and admitting he poisoned Bonzi, but claiming Duane (who does have tattoos) killed Carmen. Despite Joan's insistence, Lewis has no interest in prosecuting Tyus. She meets secretly with Halcon to reveal Carmen's killer is in witness protection, but if Halcon returns Carmen's corpse for autopsy, she'll assure Tyus' imprisonment, where Mara Tres can exact revenge. On the video, Carmen's lip was bloodied, and her restraints changed; she had bitten Tyus, and blood in her throat matched Tyus' DNA. Having perjured himself, his immunity deal is voided. At a health clinic, Sherlock imagines his mother May before undergoing an MRI.

=== Season 6 (2018) ===
No. overall	No. in season	Title	Directed by	Written by	Original release date	U.S. viewers (millions)
121	1	"An Infinite Capacity for Taking Pains"	Christine Moore	Bob Goodman	April 30, 2018	4.74
Holmes is diagnosed with post-concussion syndrome following Shinwell's attack. After a meeting, Michael Rowan credits Sherlock with helping him through his addictions. Tabloid celebrity Sophie Bishop hires Sherlock and Joan to find her missing ex-lover, Sammy Olivetti after the release of their sex tape. Sherlock is bribed $5 million to drop the case; the transaction is traced to an offshore account. After recognizing the coffee shop where the video was uploaded, Sophie is found slain. Her husband Ryan Hayes is suspected because he leaked the video, and stands to inherit her $60 million family trust. Bethany Marshall comes forward with another sex tape. Holmes proves Ryan's guilt via a hidden camera activated by a switch in Sammy's deadbolt. Sherlock admits to Joan that he is struggling with his diagnosis, as his sobriety hinges on his commitment to his work. Wanting to go to a meeting, Sherlock calls Michael, who is busy digging a forest grave to bury a young blonde woman's corpse.
122	2	"Once You've Ruled Out God"	Guy Ferland	Robert Hewitt Wolfe	May 7, 2018	4.59
Sherlock and Joan investigate Rohan Giri's death by lightning strike, discovering that he was murdered by a LIPC electrolaser. The weapon's financier, Mr. Kwan, confesses, claiming he only wanted to incapacitate Giri to buy time. However, black market plutonium he smuggled to power the laser was stolen, possibly to build a dirty bomb. National Nuclear Security Administration Agent Don Kohler takes charge of the investigation. An 88 bomb maker is found murdered in New Jersey, where residual radiation readings indicate plutonium. Police receive an anonymous tip that a mosque is the target. A suspicious van is spotted outside the mosque. Authorities mobilize, but Sherlock realizes the threat is a distraction for a $300 million diamond heist by The Dutchman, in collusion with Kohler. Meanwhile, Lin Wen gives Joan a letter from their father after his funeral. Joan initially throws it away because his last letter had merely been indecipherable schizophrenic ramblings. Holmes retrieves the letter and convinces Watson to read it. She meets Lin at his grave, revealing that their father wrote to say how "amazing and beautiful" Lin was.
123	3	"Pushing Buttons"	Christine Moore	Jeffrey Paul King	May 14, 2018	4.43
Sherlock and Joan discover the world of rare antiquities after the death of George Nix during a Revolutionary War reenactment. He was the owner of a gym franchise with a lot of angry franchisees. His sole heir, a daughter set to inherit $5 million, lives in a commune preaching the evils of capitalism. Sherlock meets Michael after his neurologist raises his dose and his friend recommends trusting Joan and the others in his life. George's house is burned down and then looted by a firefighter, but they soon discover the theft is a crime of opportunity, with the firefighter guilty of neither the murder nor the arson. Holmes and Watson then turn their attention to a stockpile of signatures of Button Gwinnett, one of the signers of the Declaration of Independence. They discover a land grant proving ownership of very valuable real estate by descendants of soldiers who are now suing a developer who participated in the reenactment. They prove the arson through chemicals absorbed by cat litter, forcing him to confess to the murder as well.
124	4	"Our Time Is Up"	Guy Ferland	Liz Friedman	May 21, 2018	4.17
Sherlock and Joan investigate the death of Joan's former therapist, Candice Reed. When they question Alfonse Kapoor, (Note: Maulik Pancholy as Alfonse Kapoor) one of her patients, he attempts suicide. At the hospital, Sherlock meets Alfonse's boss, Sydney Place, (Note: Douglas Hodge as Sydney Place) who was also Candice's landlord. He throws suspicion on her partner, Dr. Leo Demopoulos. (Note: James Urbaniak as Dr. Leo Demopoulos) In Dr. Reed's office, Sherlock and Joan find a listening device. They deduce that Place put it there to listen in on Kapoor's conversations with Dr. Reed. The device recorded the murder, but Place's fixer, Mr. Clay, (Note: Reg E. Cathey as Mr. Clay) destroyed it. He tells Sherlock that the murderer talked what he thought was gibberish, but Sherlock identifies it as Greek and deduces that Lemopoulos killed Dr. Reed so that Kapoor would talk about his job and share insider information with him instead of Dr. Reed. Meanwhile, after reading what her therapist wrote about her, Joan considers becoming a mother and Sherlock continues to struggle with headaches from his PCS.
125	5	"Bits and Pieces"	John Polson	Tamara Jaron	May 28, 2018	3.94
Sherlock turns up with a man's severed, embalmed head and no memory of how he got it. They discover that the victim, a tissue donor, might have possibly been infected with something and murdered to cover it up. Meanwhile, Sherlock comes clean to Captain Gregson about his post-concussion syndrome. Furious, Gregson orders Sherlock off duty until cleared by the doctor. They learn that two people who received donations from the original victim, Eric Russo, have been murdered. It turns out that Russo contracted an extremely deadly strain of bird flu, but had only a few mild symptoms. However, those who received his tissue donations were not so lucky. That made it worth killing for his antibodies.
126	6	"Give Me the Finger"	Jonny Lee Miller	Jordan Rosenberg	June 4, 2018	4.41
A Japanese former Yakuza is murdered. Sherlock and Joan find out that he wore a prosthetic finger, concealing a thumb drive. Another Yakuza tells them that the victim had robbed a place and, when Sherlock and Joan investigate, they discover that it was a military facility and part of the nuclear missile control system. The victim had broken into it as part of an assessment; he had become a security consultant. The military was updating their system, so their new operating system could be on the missing thumb drive. Sherlock and Joan deduce that the victim was murdered to delay the update. The murderer had stumbled upon one of the two floppy discs that contain the recipe for the paper on which American currency is printed; they needed time to locate and steal the second before the system was updated and the old equipment destroyed. Meanwhile, Gregson finds out his daughter Hannah is an alcoholic. Hannah finds her roommate murdered in their home while Michael sits outside in a car. He had approached Hannah earlier under a pretense.
127	7	"Sober Companions"	Seith Mann	Jason Tracey	June 11, 2018	4.35
Sherlock's condition worsens as he disregards his health in an attempt to stop a serial killer before he strikes again. Sherlock deduces that the serial killer has dressed the victim in clothes from several other women, who he presumes are other victims. With Joan and Bell's help, Sherlock is able to identify the owner of a pair of earrings dressed on the victim as belonging to Polly Keller, the woman whose disappearance Michael asked Sherlock to investigate. After meeting Michael and discussing Polly, Sherlock realizes that Michael is the serial killer. After failing to find any evidence and with Michael admitting his guilt to Sherlock, Sherlock and Joan attempt to dose Michael with heroin. Before they can dose him, Sherlock receives a call from Michael, telling him he is leaving and will postpone his killings until Sherlock can get better, after which he will return to New York. Sherlock then heads to Vermont to recover.
128	8	"Sand Trap"	Jennifer Lynch	Kelly Wheeler	June 18, 2018	4.54
3 months later: Sherlock returns to the brownstone. There, he is surprised by the presence of a pregnant woman that Joan has as her house guest and whose baby Joan wishes to adopt. Soon after, Sherlock and Joan are called to investigate the murder of a woman whose body parts have been found in concrete slabs. Upon investigating, Sherlock and Joan find out that the murdered woman had discovered that a construction company was siphoning sand from the Hudson River, which was going to lead to a bridge's collapse. They eventually deduce that the person who murdered the woman was the man who had approved the building site permit illegally and would profit handsomely from the bridge collapse by giving the contract to build a new bridge to a company who was paying him under the table. As the pregnant mother is about to leave the brownstone, she tells Joan that she has decided to keep the baby because Joan has inspired her to believe that she, too, can do anything.
129	9	"Nobody Lives Forever"	Guy Ferland	Jeffrey Paul King	June 25, 2018	3.97
Sherlock and Joan investigate the thallium poisoning murder of a biology professor, who was trying to double rat life spans to win a five million dollar award from Dudley Becket's Galahad Institute, with the ultimate goal of human immortality. Dudley's son Hunter is implicated after they learn that his father has spent much of their money on the Institute, endangering his trust fund. Meanwhile, Alfredo asks Sherlock for help robbing $100,000 from a car retailer who refused to pay Alfredo what he is owed for security work. Alfredo's brother Dante needs the money to pay loan sharks. Sherlock refuses to help, as Dante contributed to Alfredo's previous drug use and life of crime. Sherlock deals with unresolved feelings towards his own brother, Mycroft. Sherlock tells Alfredo that he has given Dante the money after telling him what he thought of him, but forgiving him nevertheless. Sherlock decides to contact Mycroft, but discovers that Mycroft died ten months earlier of a brain hemorrhage.
130	10	"The Adventure of the Ersatz Sobekneferu"	Lucy Liu	Robert Hewitt Wolfe	July 2, 2018	3.89
Morland visits Sherlock to discuss Mycroft's recent death and Morland's re-writing of his will, while Sherlock expresses his wish to let go of old grudges. Sherlock and Joan investigate the murder of Mischa Farrell whose corpse was being prepared as an ancient Egyptian mummy, a forgery of Sobekneferu. They discover that Mischa was planning on exposing Van Faux, an ingenious forger of 17th century Dutch paintings and suspect he may have wanted to kill her to avoid being exposed. They learn that the forger is her father, Jasper Wells, (Note: Julian Sands as Jasper Wells) and she was actually trying to showcase his genius to the world. Through Jasper's connections to the dark world of forged paintings, they uncover the real killer. Meanwhile, Sherlock intercepts Vanja Borozan who has been stalking his father Morland and discovers an assassination plot. Morland tells him Moriarty has escaped her FBI handlers.
131	11	"You've Come a Long Way, Baby"	Guy Ferland	Bob Goodman	July 16, 2018	3.35
Kress & Howell lawyer Gilbert Pham is murdered the day before a big merger between Washburn Tobacco and Summit-Stow Distributors. Sherlock and Joan suspect Pham was silenced over unaccounted finances. They discover Tim Darsha is an ATF undercover agent investigating tobacco smugglers. Joan enlists The Nose to determine smuggling routes. From surveillance video, it's evident Darsha and Agent Nick Evaneer are skimming proceeds into their own off-books slush fund. Darsha and Evaneer have a shoot-out, each suspecting the other emptied their $26,000,000 account. A third party is discovered; their secretary Maggie Foltz, who transferred the funds and murdered Pham. Meanwhile, Sherlock investigates who hired Vanja Borozan to kill his father Morland (in "The Adventure of the Ersatz Sobekneferu"). Sherlock tells Morland he won't help kill Moriarty, having arranged a stalemate via Ellory, a café cashier proxy; having persuaded Moriarty that Morland will soon die naturally of old age, Morland retails control of Moriarty's criminal organization, but if she kills Morland, Sherlock will assume control. Morland warns Sherlock, he'll eventually have to deal with Moriarty, and this current stalemate means he won't be there to help after he dies. Sherlock replies, "And that is how it should be."
132	12	"Meet Your Maker"	Ron Fortunato	Robert Hewitt Wolfe	July 23, 2018	3.45
Joan's sister sends her a client who is looking for a missing woman. After much detective grunt work, Joan finds the apartment of the missing woman and realizes that she has been kidnapped. Sherlock and Joan then track down several leads, eventually discovering the abducted woman's boyfriend, a blacksmith, has also been abducted. Then, by piecing together evidence, Sherlock and Bell realize that the abducted couple are being forced to make illegal guns for a Latino gang. The kidnapped woman's brother has a matching gang tattoo for the Latino gang and he confesses. Meanwhile, Bell is offered a job by the U.S. Marshals and soon discovers that it was Sherlock who recommended him. Sherlock tells him he wants him to take the job because, as soon as Gregson retires, it is unlikely the new Captain would look favorably at Bell, who works closely with consultants outside of the NYPD. Bell tells Sherlock that he is not going to take the job before Gregson tells him to do so and that he is proud of him.
133	13	"Breathe"	Christine Moore	Bob Goodman	July 30, 2018	3.33
Holmes and Watson investigate the death of a relocation expert, Leland Frisk, who was poisoned by wine laced with cyanide. Frisk had a secret career as a contract killer. Talking to his assistant Sherry Lennox, (Note: Lesli Margherita as Sherry Lennox) they identify businessman Cal Medina, (Note: Joaquim de Almeida as Cal Medina) as a suspect and his fingerprint is found on one of the wine glasses, but he has a popular politician vouch for his alibi. Sherlock and Watson set out to identify for what murder Medina hired Frisk in the first place. They identify the original victim, a scientist that supposedly found another treatment for cystic fibrosis, while Medina had just raised the price of the medicine that was being used to treat it. Medina turns out to have been framed for Frisk's murder by Frisk himself, who had neither killed the scientist nor worked for Medina at all. Frisk had a son suffering from cystic fibrosis and was obsessed with eliminating Medina, so the medicine his son needed would become affordable again. When the FBI was closing in on him, he committed suicide and framed Medina. Even though Frisk's plan failed, Sherlock and the NYPD bring Medina to justice with help from the FBI.
134	14	"Through the Fog"	Guy Ferland	Jeffrey Paul King	August 6, 2018	3.38
There is a biological attack at the precinct. Detective Bell is exposed to an unknown substance and quickly deduces that the perpetrator is one of the people locked inside the quarantined precinct. Soon, two civilians that were supposed to give witness statements start to show symptoms. Sherlock and Watson figure out that photos of the precinct on the phone that was used to set off the device were taken during a time only cops were at the precinct. They dig up some things from a suspect cop's past but, when they can't log onto the system remotely, Gregson finds out that someone appearing to be from the CDC took the precinct's servers. Gregson concludes that the supposed terrorist attack must be a distraction for a heist. The civilians that showed symptoms must have been faking it. A background check reveals that both of them, as well as the cop they suspected, were bankrupt and had carried out the heist together with a repo man they all knew; the biological attack had been fake. Meanwhile, Watson deals with her mother's progressing Alzheimer's.
135	15	"How to Get a Head"	Christine Moore	Sherman Li	August 12, 2018	3.02
A woman, anxious about her chicken Irma, calls cops who find Religion Prof. Gabriel Rojas' headless corpse, stuffed with a chicken's head. Councilman Ledesma says Gabriel was a Police/FBI occult expert, mentioning a Palo Mayombe case involving a crypt's stolen skull, but Cerio Cristobal, imprisoned, wasn't devout; it was a prank. A Guatemalan Rum bottle, thrown through their window, leads to Father Vega, who explains unionizing Champerico workers are targeted by paramilitary group Movimiento Armando para una Guatemala Libre. (Note: "Movimiento Armando para una Guatemala Libre" is Spanish for "Armed Movement for a Free Guatemala" abbreviated, MAGL.) Valentina Duran "disappeared" after contacting American labor organizers. Mallory says Champerico threatened the NYC Council against alcohol excise tax increases. Owner Treadwell proves Valentina hasn't "disappeared." She ran from MAGL during her pregnancy. Gabriel photographed MAGL, linking tattoos to Champerico's private security. Bell finds Gabriel's head; Ledesma is on-scene, without his toupée. Evidenced by photos, they confront Ledesma, who took bribes. Bell matches Ledesma's DNA to blood on the chicken's talons. Meanwhile, after Joan's date with Detective Grimes, Sherlock suggests Detective Lena Romero as Bell's replacement. After talking with Lt. Moira Baker, Gregson tells Sherlock, Romero's too "creative" regarding unwarranted searches and "anonymous" tips. Gregson loves that Sherlock recommended Bell to the U.S. Marshals, but replacing him won't be easy.
136	16	"Uncanny Valley of the Dolls"	Jonny Lee Miller	Tamara Jaron and Kelly Wheeler	August 13, 2018	3.48
Bruce Deramore is murdered; his PerfectMate Robotics model 10 Skyler sex doll "witnessed" it. Bell experiences uncanny valley "discomfort." Alden Lubbock unlocks the robot's encrypted memory storage. Bruce's ex-girlfriend, Catholic school teacher Nina Hudgins, is "mortified" that Skyler looks like her. SingularityCon's panelist Evan Kowalski believes they killed Bruce over top-secret government "teleportation" plans; scan-faxing molecules via 3D printer. Dr. Klaus Ziegler demonstrates, "transporting" a chocolate bunny. Enforcing the Invention Secrecy Act, Deramore's Bioinformatics Lab supervisor Dr. Ken Fukata is arrested by the U.S. Army Research Laboratory. They question grad students Phillip Bridwell, Rupert Hong, and Gwen Haeny, who says Fukata named it, "Digital-to-Organic Data Transmitter." NYPD pressures General Alvero to produce Fukata, who "under-represented" (i.e., stole) his students' work. Joan identifies the killer from Skyler's playlist; one song is different than Bruce's death-thrash metal. Sherlock phones Gwen, whose ringtone is "Ring My Bell" by Anita Ward. Meanwhile, Criminal Statistics Professor Baynes denies Bell his class, because he's resentful of Holmes, who solved an MP's murder while Baynes was a D.I. at Scotland Yard, thus hampering his Chief Inspector promotion. Sherlock "makes amends" by brokering a high-salary corporate Head of Security job, provided Baynes resigns as Bell's teacher.
137	17	"The Worms Crawl In, the Worms Crawl Out"	Jon Michael Hill	Jordan Rosenberg	August 20, 2018	3.34
A worm harvester unearths body parts from Dr. William "Worm Hunter" Velnik, Millerton University's Senior Professor of Invertebrate Zoology. Zeke admits doctoring security footage, concealing Velnik's "hook-ups," including Tara Keane, Professor Sepi Chamanara, and Becca Mainzer, whose husband Donnie shot him, but Velnik wore hoodie-esque body armor; "the thinnest ballistic cloth in the world," worth millions. Jon of Hoyt Amor Solutions paid Velnik $200,000 to produce worm-insect fiber in "commercial quantities." Mason discovers death threats from Quinn's private equity firm; a worm "delivery system" to mine investment/buyout data. But Velnik didn't make the hoodie. After testing other samples, Dr. Vit Parnthong at Orb:Lite labs says their fiber is Darwin's bark spider silk. Dr. Scott Elke admits having sex with Sepi, who stole spiders. Sepi claims her prototype was to protect Velnik, using mass-produced fiber from bark spider gene-spliced, "transgenic silkworms." Hoyt admits hiring Velnik to destroy Sepi's silkworm farm using root-knot roundworms. They confront Sepi, who combated Velnik's worms using research from his missing HDD, spattered with his blood. Meanwhile, Sherlock's file is stolen from neurologist Dr. Amelia Furing; after an imposter buys his "A-number" on the dark web, he finds Nick Agnes, hired by serial killer Michael Rowan.
138	18	"The Visions of Norman P. Horowitz"	Lucy Liu	S : Brandon Tanori; S/T : Jason Tracey	August 27, 2018	3.57
David Horowitz claims his schizophrenic brother Norman died after predicting future obituaries, and Sherlock is next. David and his wife Luz explain, Norman believed in simulation theory. Joan discovers Norman corresponded with Henry Baskerville, who provides a simulation symposium attendees list. Joan tries to solve Christina Dawson's suicide. Her husband Jonathan says she didn't leave a note; a neighbor's security video, shows her jumping. Channel 10 News reporter Deborah Garrisi breaks the story. Suspecting a killer leaked Norman's list, Sherlock tries to get Deborah's source. RealityIsnt.net private chat room user WokeBaeBae seems to have been Garrisi's source; Bell identifies the moderator Commander Deez as Terry Weaver, who tries hanging himself to "take the easy way out" instead of being tortured, as Norman predicted. Terry says Norman had an editor for his "big book of predictions...called Visions." Bell phones that Baskerville's head of security Greg Haden pulled Grand Central Station's fire alarm. Baskerville explains, Haden stopped a terrorist attack predicted in Visions, which he purchased for $4 million from David. Sherlock phones Gregson to raid David's home, but they're gone. From a photo of the Horowitz brothers, Sherlock deduces they're leaving for Bogotá, having used scopolamine to induce Christina to jump.
139	19	"The Geek Interpreter"	Christine Moore	Tamara Jaron and Kelly Wheeler	September 3, 2018	3.30
Harlan Emple wants to hire Sherlock and Watson because his mathematics doctoral student, Lily Zavala, has missed the oral defense of her thesis. He becomes the prime suspect in her disappearance; he was attracted to her, but had not told her because university rules forbid teacher-student relationships. Her parents receive a ransom call. The trail leads to the body of ex-con Jimmy Cantrell, one of the kidnappers. Lily eventually escapes. She was being forced to change the mathematical calculations used to update flood plain maps for the city. Cantrell's landlord owns property that a company is negotiating to purchase for its new headquarters. The update would put the land in the high-risk zone, which would likely cause the company to look elsewhere, costing the landlord millions. (He killed Cantrell because Cantrell got greedy and came up with the ransom demand on his own.) Meanwhile, Watson believes that Sherlock broke up with Fiona Helbron because she could never provide what he had with Moriarty. He asks Athena, a longtime sex partner, out on a date to see if their relationship could develop. She accepts. Harlan tells Lily how he feels; his feelings are reciprocated.
140	20	"Fit to be Tied"	Ron Fortunato	Jason Tracey	September 10, 2018	3.17
At Saint Olafs Church, a police detective finds Rachel Garner strangled with rubber tubing used by heroin addicts; Sherlock believes serial killer Michael Rowan returned to NYC. FBI Special Agent Mallick heads the investigation. Michael appears at Major Cases to "help" (i.e., taunt) Sherlock, but doesn't admit to anything. Everyone hackers discover William Bazemore withdrew $9,900; Joan suspects he bankrolled Michael's flight from justice. From Michael's five-year sobriety coin online purchase, Sherlock finds Michael's hideout; a stalker photo alibis him for Rachel's murder. While questioning Rachel's colleague Gary, Gregson recognizes Mills Blakney Capital partner Daniel Cummings, the husband of Judge Marilyn Whitfield who denied surveillance warrants and knew Michael's M.O. They learn she killed Rachel, who had an affair with Daniel. At the brownstone, Michael attacks Joan for telling William his husband Ray didn't commit suicide, but was killed by Michael as a misguided means to "help" William's sobriety. Joan manages to stab Michael with a helicopter tail rotor (from another case), driving him away. Joan is hospitalized with broken ribs. The next day, Michael is found beaten to death at a Hunts Point sanitation transfer station; Joan is the FBI's prime suspect.
141	21	"Whatever Remains, However Improbable"	Christine Moore	Robert Doherty	September 17, 2018	3.10
FBI Special Agent Mallick accuses Joan of killing Michael Rowan, playing a phone recording of Michael calling Joan's name before he was beaten to death. Joan hires lawyer Angela Donnely to advise her. Gregson bars Sherlock from investigating, saying be patient. From Sherlock's morgue photos of Michael's corpse, Joan recognizes Vietnam war-era combat medic stitches. Sherlock confronts fellow addict, Denny Mulgrew, who admits treating Michael. With luminol, they find the crime scene cleaned by bleach. Joan wants to inform Mallick, but Sherlock disagrees, finding a woman's footprints. From garbage, they deduce Michael's corpse was moved, and question garbage truck mechanic Curtis, father-in-law to one of Michael's victims; he refuses to say whom he helped to dump Michael's body. They find security footage destroyed by Gregson; confronted, Sherlock learns Thomas' daughter Hannah Gregson killed Michael, avenging her friend Maddie (who Michael killed in "Give Me the Finger"). Sherlock and Gregson argue, neither willing to let their loved ones be jailed. Joan is willing to do nothing, confident she won't be convicted. Mallick hands Joan an affidavit to sign, stating she's not an accessory; Sherlock "confessed" to Michael's murder, giving them Hannah's bloody baton, but in London, MI6 shields Sherlock from extradition. Season epilogue: At 221B Baker Street, Sherlock discusses the case of Lord St. Simon's missing bride, Miss Hatty Doran of San Francisco, but Sherlock is distracted by the "racket next door." Sherlock visits his new neighbor at 221A, telling Joan, "We've been summoned to Scotland Yard. There's been a murder." Joan echoes the sentiment Sherlock had expressed in New York, "We're not partners. We're two people who love each other."

=== Season 7 (2019) ===
No. overall	No. in season	Title	Directed by	Written by	Original release date	U.S. viewers (millions)
142	1	"The Further Adventures"	Christine Moore	Robert Doherty and Jason Tracey	May 23, 2019	4.08
Bernardo "Beppo" Pugliesi breaks into Sherlock's flat to smash the last of six "Royal Wedding 2018" busts, exposing the Black Pearl of the Borgias. DCI Athelney Jones slights "Doc" Joan, disliking gun-toting Americans. Popular tabloid model Lola Quin becomes the latest victim of acid attacks. They find the culprit's moped, a partial fingerprint, and Lola's cash, eliminating greed as motive. Distraught over her badly damaged face, Lola kills herself. She had previously "got in a spat" via email, but paparazzi Derek Casey provides his alibi, pointing out Lola's scandalous photos with Metro Flash owner Ruby Carville, who Sherlock calls, "practically a Bond villain." Kitty Winter tells Sherlock that Joan is not happy in London. Ruby reveals, Lola wasn't her lover, but her daughter; she had no motive. Joan reviews Lola's social media, finding she uncharacteristically ceased selfies two weeks prior. Sherlock finds mixologist Chip, who served Lola, whose face was covered from plastic surgery, leading them to Dr. Garret Halsey, who splashed acid to cover his malpractice. Meanwhile in New York, Bell advises Captain Gregson to make amends with Sherlock and Joan, since they have always been there for him. Later, Gregson is hospitalized in critical condition after being shot.
143	2	"Gutshot"	Guy Ferland	Jason Tracey and Robert Doherty	May 30, 2019	3.78
Taggers hear Gregson's car crash; Arnold splits, but Tremaine calls Five-O. Bell thanks him. Joan and Sherlock (aka Harlan Emple) return to New York City to help investigate. Gregson's wife Paige is now wheelchair-bound from MS. Sherlock revisits the scene. From skid-marks, he explores a different route, finding the crime scene and .380 shells. Smelling lye, Sherlock finds the eight months-dead body of Tim Bledsoe hidden inside a snack bar wall. Tim's mother Elise says his father Marty, a sergeant, kept the police from looking too hard. Marty calls Tim a "bad seed." They interview Patrick Meers, Dr. Eugene Hawes, Jake Goodel. Bell finds a suspect, Tim's friend Dylan Halleran, who says his car was impounded. The trunk smells of fertilizer; blasting caps and a ticket receipt points to a planned terrorist bombing of the Connecticut Ferry. Through Elise's transactions, they locate Natty G's diner attached to a youth hostel, at which security footage shows Tim abducted at gunpoint by Patrick, allegedly after a bar fight. Arrested, Patrick confesses to killing Tim and shooting Gregson, but denies the bomb plot. Suspecting he lied, Joan stays at the brownstone to investigate further. Sherlock surrenders himself to the FBI.
144	3	"The Price of Admission"	Thomas Carter	Tamara Jaron	June 6, 2019	3.70
High-end foreign-trade zone storage facility manager Virgil Gwinn is murdered. Sherlock and Joan discover Gwinn secretly searched units for information to sell. Sherlock narrows clients down to one suspect; heiress Aura Swenson, whose deceased father had illegally amassed a religious artifact collection through his international construction company. Appraiser Sebastian Florenti claims he quit after Swenson asked him to forge the artifacts' provenance. Swenson proves she has no motive; she had negotiated with the Ethiopian government to secure her ownership of the objects in exchange for helping rebuild the country's infrastructure following an announced peace deal with neighboring Eritrea. Joan finds a 1928 archaeologist's journal entry suggesting there is oil on disputed land Ethiopia was ceding to Eritrea. Upon learning this, Ethiopia cancels the deal. Sherlock realizes Florenti sold the information to the Eritreans and hired a hitman to kill Gwinn. Meanwhile, Sherlock attempts to secure his legal U.S. re-entry by blackmailing FBI Assistant Director George Eagen, who Morland had bribed in the past. He succeeds, but not how he planned; Michael Rowan's murder is pinned on convicted killer Santos Oliva, who hangs himself in prison. Eagen warns he'll go public, and Joan will be charged, if Sherlock pressures him again.
145	4	"Red Light, Green Light"	Jonny Lee Miller	Robert Hewitt Wolfe	June 13, 2019	3.75
A van collides with a semi at a city intersection then explodes, killing the van driver and a good Samaritan trying to help. The driver was a member of the Mara Tres gang. Sherlock and Joan discover the traffic lights were manipulated to cause the crash. Initially, the fuel-laden van is suspected to be part of a terrorist attack, but then Sherlock discovers that more traffic lights were hacked. The route of the sabotage shows that the real target was the semi's cargo: ultra-high-speed elevators for a skyscraper under construction. This is only the latest act of sabotage, all of which delay work so much the construction company will be unable to start on another billion-dollar contract it landed. Rival Maranek Construction will get the project instead. Sherlock sets a trap, incriminating Cameron Maranek, the company's owner. Also, as Gregson begins his road to recovery, he, Sherlock, and Joan suspect that there is a larger game at play.
146	5	"Into the Woods"	Christine Moore	Jeffrey Paul King	June 20, 2019	3.34
Isabel Perez is murdered during a race in the woods. Moonshiner Renny Henderson's corpse and a dead hog is found in a nearby pond. Sherlock believes Renny was forced to distill ricin, which he tested on the hog before his murder. Sherlock reconstructs a wine bottle from Henderson's shack. A fingerprint leads to wine dealer Todd Harris, who's been shot. Bottles of Chateau Baptiste '57 were stolen, the favorite vintage of hedge fund manager, Jason Wood. They set a trap for the killer, a bartender named Colby, who's obsessed with Jason's wife, Corinna. Meanwhile, famous tech mogul Odin Reichenbach asks Joan and Sherlock to investigate his niece Abigail's kidnapping threats. They find no credible suspects. Asked why the "wild goose chase," Odin admits, "It was a test" of their willingness to break "more than a dozen laws." Reichenbach would "do anything to protect an innocent person," an "impulse...we share." Odin admits "taking steps," telling an "Army veteran with" Patrick Meers' "psychological makeup...about Tim Bledsoe" to "avoid a tragedy," saving two-hundred lives (as depicted in "Gutshot"); Gregson's shooting was "a mess" he didn't order.
147	6	"Command: Delete"	Craig Zisk	Jordan Rosenberg	June 27, 2019	3.09
Carla Whitmark's husband, NYPD ESU sniper Davis, suffering PTSD, goes missing. Bell fears a shooting spree. From Libby they learn Davis moonlights, editing pornography for Juliana, but without motive to kill. Sherlock locates Davis, who was blackmailed into shooting windows where Alwyn Smith safeguarded boxer Baron Wright. Davis' "scare" forced a move; someone else killed Baron. Endocrinologist Dr. Gregory Burgess admits swapping Baron's EPI medication to study Dunnigan-type lipodystrophy. Viola's home was burgled for photos. Coffee importer Cassina locates Baron's ancestral estate in Volcan Acatenango, worth millions per year. Guatemalan Consul Duarte confirms a "researcher" asked about heirs. Joan suspects Tessa Maier, pregnant by Baron. Meanwhile, tech billionaire Odin Reichenbach tries enlisting Sherlock and Joan to prevent future crimes using Odker social media. They meet again so NSA can record "actionable" intel. Confronted about executing school bus driver Ruthie Deller for pre-crime suicide-murder, Odin justifies, "All those kids...Her life wasn't worth the risk." Agent McNally claims he needs time to build a case. Sherlock deduces Odin wore the wire, making McNally part "of Reichenbach's cabal." McNally threatens Gregson, Hannah, Paige, Bell, Chantal, Kitty, Archie, and Joan with "botched home invasion...maybe something messier." Sherlock tells Joan, there's nothing else to do.
148	7	"From Russia with Drugs"	Michael Hekmat	Sean Bennett	July 4, 2019	2.72
Janice finds her boyfriend Ridley Dineen dead after raiding a drug dealer's stash house. Dr. Eugene Hawes' "money's on fentanyl" pending the tox screen, but according to the American College of Medical Toxicology, he doubts fentanyl-covered cash could kill. Sherlock finds cat hairs, but Ridley was allergic, leading to finding an inhaler containing aerosolized Kolokol-1, perhaps indicating espionage. Sherlock contacts stripper-cum-teacher spy Olga Berezhnaya (from "Murder Ex Machina") to assess Russian involvement. Bell finds who Dineen shot; Mensa member, Cecil Troy, an art restorer at Troy-Kensit Labs. Troy's colleague Audrey Kensit says they invented a solvent to clean ancient textiles without damage. Olga denies Troy was a spy, signaling towards chemical weapons scientist Pasha Voynov who emigrated after the Dubrovka Theater tragedy; his apartment explodes as she leaves a dossier. It outlines robberies of "Bratva" Beach shops, all Russian mafia fronts, which the DEA is investigating. Joan finds DEA's new safety protocols for handling contraband, including drug cash, which leads to Audrey's arrest for "actually 'laundering' seized money." Meanwhile, Det. Bree Novacek turns in her papers, three years shy of retirement. Captain Gregson returns to active duty, and investigates whether Captain Dwyer sexually harassed Bree.
149	8	"Miss Understood"	Michael Smith	Bob Goodman	July 11, 2019	2.90
Waiting at the brownstone is pathological liar, Cassie Lenue, "the impostor formerly known as Mina Davenport" (in "Miss Taken"), who's beaten charges for murdering Agent Underhill, but served twenty months for fraud. Joan recognizes "Lenue" as "LNU...last name unknown...the court's version of John Doe." Cassie claims Heather Foley, who was shot, is her foster mother. Judd Foley helps reveal his wife moonlit for Formula-Share; she had "concerns about the source." Sherlock smells a con. They meet Homicide Detective Rhea Farrad of the Passaic County Prosecutor's Office, and NJSP Detective Owen Calabrissi, who says the formula is "hot" and Heather was their CI, with Detective Ocasio working undercover to take down the so-called "Baby Formula Mafia." Cassie's halfway house social worker shows Sherlock browser history, "crime blotter stuff...dead people...an obsession." With her lawyer, they question Meredith Sagehorn, who has an alibi. Bell and Joan try to identify shoplifters. Loss prevention coordinator Jim Bendix at Leehoven's Supermarkets provided State Senate testimony about how formula cash vouchers artificially jack up prices, incentivizing crime. A new theory emerges. Heather was killed by Founder-CEO Mack Leehoven to "stall the investigation until after the vote." Cassie blackmails Mack for $2 million, discovering, "Calabrissi was Leehoven's fixer."
150	9	"On the Scent"	Christine Moore	Jeffrey Paul King	July 18, 2019	2.81
The "Ghost of Brooklyn" serial killer is suspected in metal sculptor Caroline Gibbs' murder. Reviewing previous victims like Hutchins' daughter Megan, they re-examine DNA, discovering there's no "Ghost" – Northwest Med Tech manager Albert Wu contaminated swabs. Artist Carson Mayfield faux-fought Caroline for publicity. Benjamin Long argued over barking dogs. They interview dog bite victims; Esther Kelton, Sasha, Zachary Fowler who's arrested for stealing phones. Joan discovers Caroline and Diana Long were lovers, the killer disguised himself, and her German shepherd's missing. Narcotics Officer Saldenbrook says ex-K-9 partner Ollie specialized in marijuana. Bell determines Caroline's sativa is from Mexican gang "Los Santiagos" led by Enrique Ruiz. Alejandro tries blocking them; lawyer Danielle Olivera turns them away. Joan took photos surreptitiously, revealing train schedules from states that legalized sales. Ollie's at the train yard, where 300 pounds were stolen. Joan posits the killer would be Caroline's size, possibly Danielle. Sherlock recognizes Danielle's bookcase. They arrest Zachary, Danielle's brother. Meanwhile, Sherlock discourages Joan investigating Parker Landis' murder in Phoenix, warning her about McNally. Sherlock contacts SIS, providing Joan an encrypted cellphone. Odin and Antonia review their "threat list...Dr. Maynard...Nora Addison," and Joan Watson contacted the Maricopa County Sheriff's Office. Odin says, "I'll handle this...myself."
151	10	"The Latest Model"	Ron Fortunato	Robert Hewitt Wolfe	July 25, 2019	2.63
A guide conducts a waking "murder tour" where Autumn Cleary was killed in 2001, finding another murder. Erika Vanderwey's certain her husband Hampton killed his mistress Autumn, but he's dead now. Durah lives where Autumn lived, and recognizes Jane Doe as Kamile Volodka, who shared their "model apartment." Sherlock enters from a secret elevator leading to where Kamile's corpse was found. A lawyer presents the building's owner, hedge fund manager Peyton Trask, who moved Kamile's body, but alibis for her murder. Her phone leads to Lanette Brooklee who helped Kamile's sister, claiming Regina OD'd on heroin. Dr. Angela Hardy defends her autopsy, but Bell finds stun-gun burns. PI Baxter Lim is found dead, stun-gunned and suffocated. His photos lead to Long Island EDM DJ Amos Deukmejian (aka Pandasalt), Regina's boyfriend, who was in Brazil when she changed her mind about giving her daughter to a private adoption agency. Security cameras show Lanette leaving the hospital; she's arrested for murder, kidnapping and illegal adoptions. Reichenbach warns, SIS, Mossad, Interpol, other agencies...none will help Sherlock. Wesley Conrad's ~80% likely to kill. Sherlock steals Wesley's 9mm, saving Bertram Iwan, but Wesley butchers his parents instead, then suicides. Reichenbach is "not changing a thing."
152	11	"Unfriended"	Lucy Liu	Bob Goodman	August 1, 2019	2.42
Reichenbach claimed Wesley stabbed his parents, but Sherlock planted webcams, which Reichenbach disabled, exactly like Sherlock's brownstone electronics. Morland helps create a false threat from Stewart Pringle, who's really his security firm employee, Wilson Kubiak. Third grade teacher Annie Spellman goes to kill Pringle. They confront her with the truth, asking who sent her and how they communicate. Joan finds Annie's "hit" missions assigned through TheSwagMachine.com. Three previous murders include scientist Talia Baccaro. Through Eldon, they learn Talia met Heal the Wild conservationist Chloe about switching LAL from horseshoe crabs to synthetics. Talia's receptiveness obviated Annie's motive; hearing Talia's brother Collin's company, FrameSift, Sherlock discovers another motive; money. Joan convinces Annie she killed an innocent woman for Reichenbach's "corporate strategy." Annie breaks down, explaining why and how she was recruited. Meanwhile, Morland peddles influence with Mrs. Tseng against Reichenbach; Gene says the board demands Odin's resignation after China, India, Indonesia, and Brazil move to ban Odker search engines, free-falling their stock. Odin circumvents Morland's influence; Tseng double-crosses Morland, conceding, Odin's "kind of power makes you and me obsolete." Gregson's informed Reichenbach contracted Patrick Meers. He determines to help convict Reichenbach, with Annie's help. Bell informs Sherlock, Morland was found dead.
153	12	"Reichenbach Falls" (Note: Reichenbach Falls is an allusion to Arthur Conan Doyle's short story The Final Problem in which Holmes confronts criminal mastermind Professor Moriarty and both fall to their deaths.)	Ron Fortunato	Jason Tracey	August 8, 2019	2.59
Annie's safe house burns down, killing her. Sherlock surmises Reichenbach's making mistakes, hiring professional hit men motivated by money, rather than zealots who'll maintain silence. Sensing surveillance at Morland's crime scene, Sherlock evacuates ESU before the car explodes. Morland's $100,000 1937 Patek Calatrava was stolen. Pawn broker Amir provides Bell a lead. ESU raids too late. Hawes identifies three Agrianos mercenaries burned in the oven; one escaped. Holmes confronts McNally at his daughter Jessi's school, warning, Reichenbach's "a problem about to be solved....help, or...suffer the same fate." McNally meets Reichenbach who wants access to every system NSA uses, "I will see every threat coming." Bell and Joan find Frederick Wentz with pancreatic cancer, but Sherlock notices Wentz' burn isn't "radiation therapy." Wentz would "rather talk to a lawyer." ADA Grassley concludes, "you got nothing." Sherlock tells Joan, "We have to plan a murder of our own." Odin tells Antonia to eliminate remaining threats. McNally wants to meet again, but it's Sherlock, with a gun. Gregson, Bell and Joan arrive at the bridge and hear two gunshots. A body drops into the river. Reichenbach surrenders, Gregson charging him with first degree murder. Episode epilogue: A real estate agent shows Signore Altamont his room with a view onto Duomo di Firenze, Florence, "the birthplace of the Renaissance." Arm in a sling, Sherlock says, "I'll take it."
154	13	"Their Last Bow"	Christine Moore	Robert Doherty	August 15, 2019	2.82
Series finale prologue (three years after events in "Reichenbach Falls"): The Morning Show 3 news host announces Odin Reichenbach's sentencing, 148 years in prison on dozens of counts, although he wasn't charged with Sherlock's murder. Her guest, Joan Watson, published The Casebook of Sherlock Holmes. Captain Bell phones, "He's back." Afghanistan veteran-cum-nanny Rose lets little Arthur run to "Mommy!" Joan's assistant Sean says an attorney's downstairs. Ronald Adair declares, "Jamie Moriarty is dead....work-related." Joan inherits a parcel, "for Sherlock Holmes upon her demise." Sherlock's tombstone reads, "Work is the best antidote to sorrow." (Note: The quote on Sherlock Holmes' tombstone, "Work is the best antidote to sorrow," is from Arthur Conan Doyle's short story The Adventure of the Empty House.) Joan demolishes it via sledge hammer. Sherlock, "Got your message. So who's trying to kill you? And how can I help?" Sherlock opens Adair's parcel; an impressionist cityscape painting. It's revealed, Joan replaced blanks with genuine shells and planted Sherlock's blood before CSU arrived. Under aliases, Sherlock traveled to Florence, Tibet, Norway, France, and Rome to sabotage Moriarty's criminal enterprise, but "She isn't dead." Bell finds Adair, executed. Joan discovers Adair wired $200,000 to Hernán Zielenko for poker losses. Sherlock steals Zielenko's winning "10" cards. Acetone reveals RFID. Sherlock had "no beef" with the Delluccis mob, so another skilled party infiltrated, rigging the underground cardroom's table. Moriarty's proxy Ellory reveals she killed Adair, "he'd been compromised," and Moriarty knew Sherlock was alive from his Vatican work. Moriarty tolerated his "interference" "because he was hurting her enemies even more....my boss, your partner...The game goes on." Sherlock finds the card sensor. His phone cuts off; Agent McNally reveals the NSA gave Reichenbach that technology. Promoted to Director of Foreign Affairs, McNally, having admired Sherlock's "top-shelf" activities abroad, offers work "on assignment." Sherlock, "What's the catch?" McNally, you'll be a ghost "the rest of your life." Sherlock confesses he didn't tell Joan he'd relapsed, nearly dying. Gregson replies, Joan had a lump removed. Joan confirms, she's "starting chemo." Sherlock hugs her, "I'm staying." Series finale epilogue (one year later): Flowers adorn the casket. McNally offers "Holmes...my condolences. She was one of a kind." Sherlock, "Watson needed my help." McNally asks if Sherlock regrets declining NSA assignments. Sherlock, "Not for a second." At the brownstone, Joan asks, "how was it? Jamie Moriarty's funeral." Sherlock, "I told you, she's not dead." Joan, "you spent $500 on a floral arrangement." Sherlock, "Do we still own a shovel?" At the 11th precinct, "cancer-free" Joan wears a wig. Sherlock, "It's very natural-looking." Wanting to consult again, they approach Captain Bell. Joan, "What if he says no?" Sherlock, "As long as we're together, what does it matter?"

== Home video releases ==
Season	Episodes	DVD release dates			
Season	Episodes	Region 1	Region 2	Region 4	Discs
1	24	August 27, 2013	December 23, 2013	February 5, 2014	6
2	24	August 26, 2014	August 25, 2014	January 28, 2015	6
3	24	August 25, 2015	September 21, 2015	December 3, 2015	6
4	24	August 23, 2016	September 26, 2016	February 8, 2017	6
5	24	August 29, 2017	October 2, 2017	April 18, 2018	6
6	21	November 6, 2018	November 19, 2018	July 3, 2019	6
7	13	September 17, 2019	October 21, 2019	August 26, 2020	3
All	154	September 17, 2019	October 21, 2019	August 26, 2020	39
