= ERTOLD pathway =

Mechanism by which proteins traffic to the lipid droplet surface

The ERTOLD pathway is one of two pathways (ie., the ERTOLD & CYTOLD pathways) which are known to mediate protein localization to the surface of lipid droplets. Unlike proteins targeting other cellular organelles, lipid droplet proteins have no distinct targeting signal or localization sequence embedded within their amino acid sequence. Nevertheless, the surface of the lipid droplet is decorated with a vast and diverse repertoire of proteins, the number of which varies from species to species.

The mechanisms by which this large and highly dynamic set of proteins traffic to the lipid droplet (LD) surface have been classified into two main categories (class I and class II), by virtue of their pathway for targeting the LD surface: the CYTOLD pathway, which mediates protein targeting from the cytosol to LDs, and the ERTOLD pathway, which directs protein targeting from the endoplasmic reticulum to LDs.

Mechanisms of protein trafficking to the lipid droplet (LD) surface have been an area of intense modern research. Protein association with the lipid droplet surface (which is a phospholipid monolayer) occurs via hydrophobic hairpins, lipidated domains, and amphipathic helices, or by binding to another protein on the LD surface. The first and best-characterized family of lipid droplet associated proteins is the perilipin protein family, consisting of five proteins. These include perilipin 1 (PLIN1), perilipin 2 (PLIN2), perilipin 3 (PLIN3), perilipin 4 (PLIN4) and perilipin 5 (PLIN5). Proteomics studies have elucidated the association of many other families of proteins to the lipid surface, including those involved in membrane trafficking, vesicle docking, endocytosis and exocytosis.

== Class I proteins: ERTOLD pathway ==
Class I proteins enter the lipid droplet (LD) surface by virtue of the ERTOLD pathway, where they are first inserted into the ER membrane and are thereafter trafficked onto the LD surface. Class I proteins form characteristic stable membrane association with the phospholipid monolayer of the LD, with this most commonly achieved via insertion of hydrophobic hairpin segments into the membrane and core. Within this configuration, class I proteins retain cytosolic exposure of both the C-terminus and N-terminus, thus creating ample opportunity for other cytosolic proteins to act upon the LD in cell signaling cascades. Class I proteins explicitly lack luminal domains, as these would preclude their movement within the ER bilayer and onto the LD surface. As such, polytopic membrane proteins can never be class I proteins, nor will they enter the LD surface via the ERTOLD pathway.

Although the structural features of class I proteins allow for their free movement between the ER bilayer and the LD surface, it remains unclear how the relative partitioning between the two organelles is controlled. Targeting to LDs is favored when the hairpin structure of class I proteins is flanked by positively charged residues, which may facilitate more energetically stable conformations on the LD surface compared to the ER bilayer. Certain class I proteins display an affinity for triacylglycerol (TAG) about their hairpin loop, which drives their concentration at the LD surface. Conversely, some class I proteins may be actively retained on the ER surface through protein-protein interactions. For example, UBXD8 is selectively partitioned onto the ER bilayer when bound to UBAC2, a polytopic ER membrane protein. Selective degradation of certain hairpin-containing proteins in the ER results in their effective accumulation at the LD surface. Although these examples and putative mechanisms offer insights as to the regulation of class I protein partitioning between the ER and LD surface, a complete mechanistic understanding of this process has yet to be uncovered.

Several imaging studies have revealed that some class I proteins localize to LDs during the earliest stages of LD biogenesis, while other proteins target LDs much later. Such observations suggest the existence of at least two ERTOLD pathways that effectively stage LD protein targeting in an orderly fashion. Interestingly, recent research reports seem to further evidence the existence of such "early" and "late" ERTOLD pathways. Recently, some class I proteins have been shown to target LDs during the budding phase of early LD biogenesis, where they appeared to diffuse onto LDs from the ER through the Seipin-stabilized neck. By contrast, other class I proteins were shown to be initially rejected at the Seipin gate and appeared to follow another distinct route, which depends on machinery typically associated with anterograde vesicular traffic in the early secretory pathway.

Factors relevant to this latent ERTOLD pathway include components of the COPII coat complex (Sec23 and Sec24), ER exit site factors (Sec12, Sec16, Sar1, and Tango1), membrane tethering complexes (TRAPP and COG complex subunits), and Rab proteins as well as SNARE proteins known for their importance in membrane fusion. These findings led to the idea that the late ERTOLD targeting pathway may involve the establishment of distinct membrane bridges between the ER and LD, which may function in a Seipin-independent fashion. In the absence of Seipin, late ERTOLD pathway cargo appears much earlier upon the LD surface, further supporting earlier studies in yeast and mammalian cells, which showed the central role of Seipin was not only concentrating triacyl glycerol (TAG), but also regulating the LD proteome by gating movement of class I proteins between the ER and LD surface.

== Class II proteins: CYTOLD pathway ==
Class II proteins enter the LD surface by virtue of the CYTOLD pathway, where they are recruited directly from the cytosol to the phospholipid monolayer, supported in some cases by chaperone proteins. Class II proteins associate with LDs via a variety of mechanisms, including direct binding onto other LD proteins or association with the lipid monolayer using a lipid anchor. Most frequently, class II proteins are found bound to LDs via amphipathic alpha-helices (AHs), in which hydrophobic and polar residuespartition to opposite sides of the helix.

Interestingly, the specificity of AH-containing proteins for the LD monolayer appears to be caused by phospholipid packing defects and the higher surface tension of the LD monolayer relative to the phospholipid bilayer of all other cellular organelles. This specificity is further increased in AH-containing proteins whose AHs are known to interact directly with TAG. However, not all AH-containing LD proteins behave as class II proteins. Recently, it was shown that some class I protein trafficking to the LD monolayer is also mediated by AHs. Comparison of multiple AHs suggests that class I behavior is favored for AHs with a reduced number of charged residues along the polar face, possibly due to the greater allowance for extensive interactions with the phospholipid side chains. Conversely, class II behavior is favored for AHs with a greater presence of charged residues, as such reduces the axial hydrophobic surface of the AH.
