= Perilipin-5 =

Mammalian protein found in Homo sapiens

PLIN5

Identifiers
- Aliases: PLIN5, LSDA5, LSDP5, MLDP, OXPAT, perilipin 5
- External IDs: OMIM: 613248; MGI: 1914218; GeneCards: PLIN5

Gene location (Human)
Chr.	Chromosome 19 (human)
Band	19p13.3	Start	4,522,531 bp
Band	19p13.3	End	4,535,224 bp

Gene location (Mouse)
Chr.	Chromosome 17 (mouse)
Band	17|17 D	Start	56,418,601 bp
Band	17|17 D	End	56,424,596 bp
RNA expression pattern
Bgee	Human / Mouse (ortholog); Top expressed in: right lobe of liver; apex of heart; body of pancreas; gastrocnemius muscle; left ovary; right ovary; muscle of thigh; tibialis anterior muscle; body of stomach; left ventricle / Top expressed in: interventricular septum; intercostal muscle; myocardium of ventricle; left lobe of liver; soleus muscle; thoracic diaphragm; digastric muscle; right ventricle; brown adipose tissue; cardiac muscles; More reference expression data
BioGPS	n/a
Gene ontology
Molecular function	lipase binding; identical protein binding
Cellular component	cytosol; cytoplasm; lipid droplet; mitochondrion
Biological process	lipid storage; negative regulation of lipid catabolic process; mitochondrion localization; positive regulation of fatty acid beta-oxidation; lipid droplet organization; negative regulation of peroxisome proliferator activated receptor signaling pathway; positive regulation of triglyceride biosynthetic process; positive regulation of lipase activity; positive regulation of lipid storage; negative regulation of triglyceride catabolic process; negative regulation of lipase activity; negative regulation of reactive oxygen species metabolic process; positive regulation of sequestering of triglyceride; negative regulation of fatty acid beta-oxidation
Sources:Amigo / QuickGO
Orthologs
Databases	NCBI: entry; OMA: entry
Species	Human	Mouse
Entrez	440503	66968
Ensembl	ENSG00000214456	ENSMUSG00000011305
UniProt	Q00G26	Q8BVZ1
RefSeq (mRNA)	NM_001013706	NM_001077348; NM_025874
RefSeq (protein)	NP_001013728	NP_001070816; NP_080150
Location (UCSC)	Chr 19: 4.52 – 4.54 Mb	Chr 17: 56.42 – 56.42 Mb
PubMed search
- Wikidata
View/Edit Human	View/Edit Mouse

Perilipin 5, also known as Oxpatperilipin 5 or PLIN5, is a protein that belongs to perilipin family. This protein group has been shown to be responsible for lipid droplet's biogenesis, structure and degradation. In particular, Perilipin 5 is a lipid droplet-associated protein whose function is to keep the balance between lipolysis and lipogenesis, as well as maintaining lipid droplet homeostasis. For example, in oxidative tissues, muscular tissues and cardiac tissues, PLIN5 promotes association between lipid droplets and mitochondria.

Inside the cell, PLIN5 can be found in multiple intracellular structures including lipid droplets, endoplasmic reticulum, mitochondria, and the cytosol. The wrong expression of this protein has been proven to be related with diseases such as skeletal muscle diseases, liver diseases or carcinogenesis.

== Perilipin Protein Family ==
PLIN5 is the fifth of the 5 perilipins which can be found on humans. All of them (PLIN1, ADRP, TIP47, S3-12 and PLIN5) have similar functionality, relating to lipid droplets. They have a 1,252% similarity with 76 identical positions. On the other hand, PLIN5 has its most similarity with PLINS 2 and 3, with over 150 similar positions and 18,644% similarity.

== Structure ==
Perilipin 5 is a relatively large protein. It is composed of 463 amino acids, weighing an average of 50.8 kDa. It contains four basic regions:

- from amino acid 1 to 173: key region for lipid droplet targeting.
- from amino acid 1 to 108: interaction with LIPE, a gene that encodes the formation of hormone-sensitive lipase, also known as HSL, whose main function is to mobilize the previously stored fats.
- from amino acid 185 to 463: interactions with PNPLA2 and ABHD5.
- from amino acid 444 to 463: targets mitochondria for lipid droplet-mitochondria association.

PLIN5 is expressed in 183 organs, having its highest expression level on the stomach fundus.

Protein Kinase A (PKA) phosphorylates residues 2, 148 and 322. Phosphorylation by PKA enables lipolysis probably by promoting the release of ABHD5 from the perilipin scaffold.

=== Evolution ===
Perilipins are considered to have evolved from a common ancestral gene. This family began to split during the first and second vertebrate genome duplication, giving birth to six types of PLIN genes, expressed throughout the animal kingdom. However, not all types are present in all animals. In fish, PLIN 1 to 6 can be found, whereas in mammals only PLIN1 to 5.

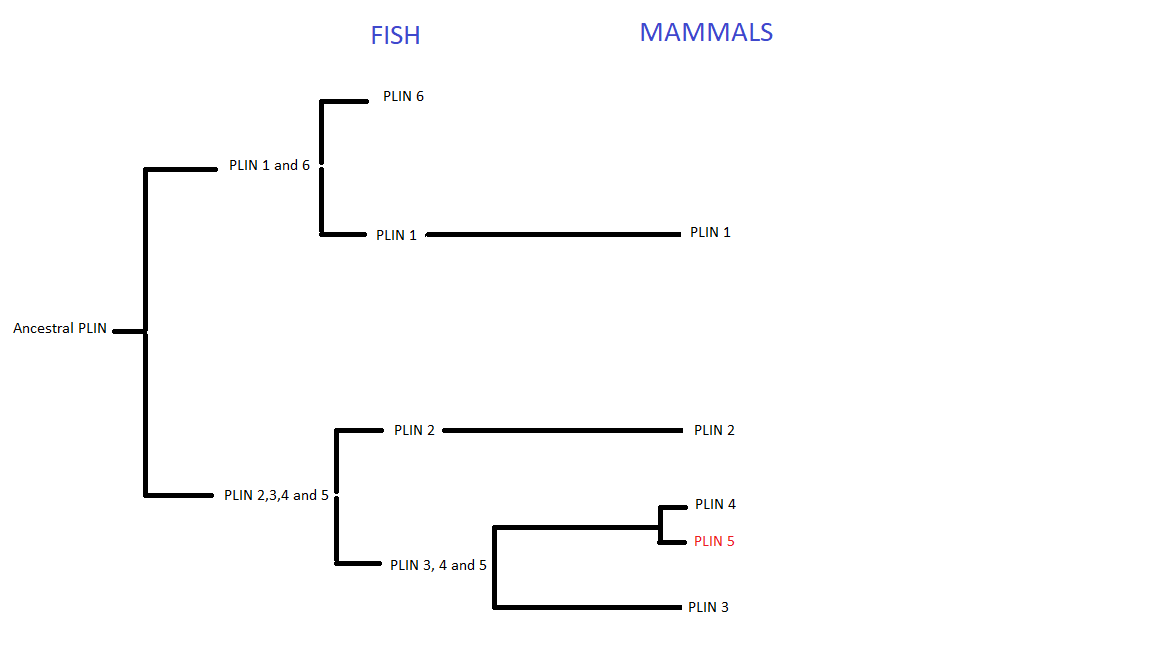
Perilipin-5 possible evolution and its expressions in other species

== Function ==
Perilipin 5 is a protein often found in the adipose tissue, especially in those with high oxidative stress, including the heart, liver, skeletal muscle and brown adipose tissue (BAT). The perilipin family contributes to the creation of lipid droplets and it also plays a pivotal role in determining what the lipid droplet's function is within the cell. In addition, perilipin 5 regulates the activation of hepatic stellate cell, implicated in fibrosis, which is the creation of new tissue to repair the one damaged.

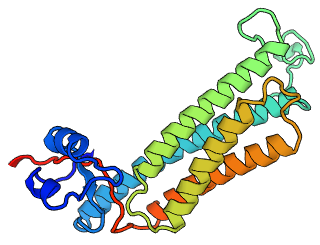
The 3D structure of Perilipin 5 on humans. It is 66.122% identical to PLIN5 on rats, with 80 identical spots.

=== Beta oxidation ===
PLIN5, as well as the other members of this protein family, is involved in lipid storage and also has energetic functions. Perilipin 5 coats the lipid droplet acting as a barrier to triglyceride, thus increasing its storage. Under basal condition, PLIN5 decreases lipolysis to prevent energy waste. If energy is needed, perilipin facilitates lipid droplets with lipases and promotes enzymatic activity, regulating energy consumption.

=== Perilipin 5-Nucleus interactions ===
The mechanism by which OXPAT5 balances energy remain to be fully clarified. It interacts mainly with LDs, though recent data suggest that this protein also targets the nucleus. When needed, perilipin 5 is phosphorylated by protein kinase A, which allows it to access the nucleus and enter the complex SIRT1/PGC-1α, involved in fatty acid oxidation. PLIN5 removes SIRT1 inhibitor CCAR2, therefore increasing its activity. As a consequence, PGC-1α boost activity levels activating certain types of genes that enhances mitochondrial function.

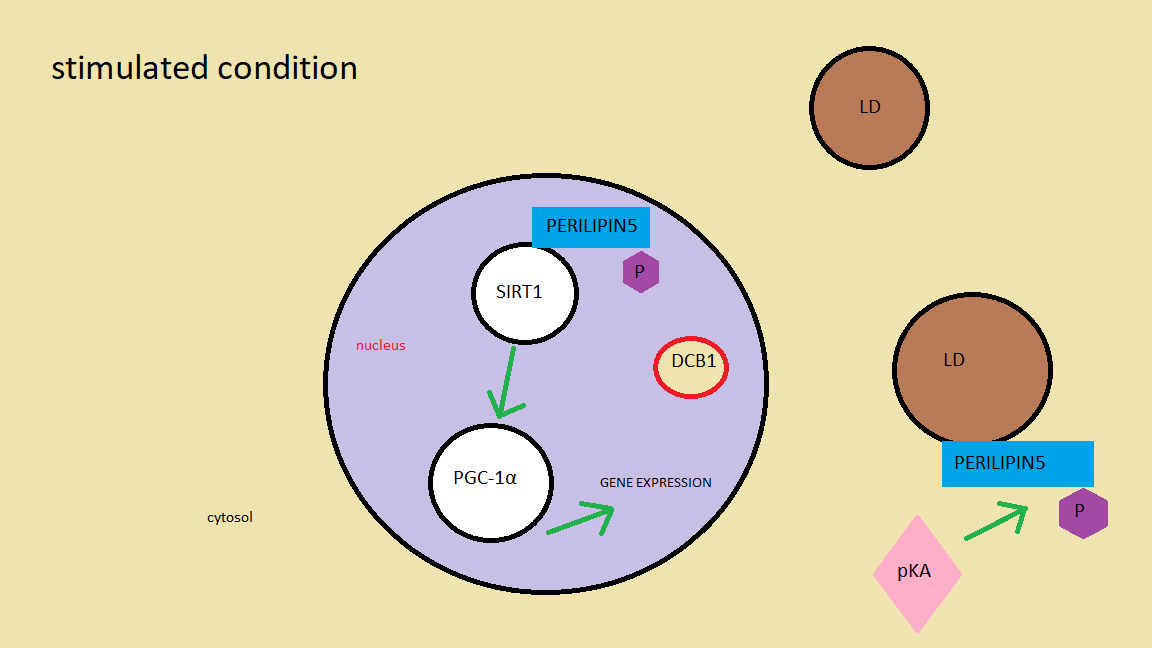
PLIN5 is phosphorylated and it accesses the nucleus displacing CCAR2 (DBC1) inhibitor

=== Mitochondria and Perilipin 5 ===
Higher levels of perilipin 5 are closely related to the association between lipid droplet and mitochondria. This is useful in case of starvation (energy shortage). When energy is needed and no glucose is available, the cell uses lipids to feed itself. In order to do that, lipid droplets move towards the mitochondria to transfer the stored fatty acids. The perilipin family opens the channel, giving way to lipids to access the mitochondria. On the other hand, this association may occur with the aim of protecting the mitochondria against toxic levels of fatty acids in the cytosol.

=== Mean Corpuscular Volume ===
PLIN5 is an enhancer of the erythrocytes count in blood, as well as hemoglobin concentration.

=== Lipid Droplet Formation ===
Mammalian Plin's are not necessary for Lipid Droplet biogenesis, but as they are the primary regulators of lipolysis, they control cellular TAG/CE levels, long-chains whose functions is to provide enough metabolic precursors as polar lipids, which will then create Lipid Droplets.

== Clinical importance ==
PLIN5 is an important regulator of cardiac and liver LDs. Both overexpression and deficiency result in serious consequences. Nevertheless, insights into PLIN5 function may contribute to therapeutic strategies that seek to exploit thermogenic adipose tissue; for example, promoting PLIN5 expression in mouse brown adipose tissue is associated with healthy remodeling of subcutaneous white adipose tissue as well as improvements in systemic glucose tolerance.

=== Overexpression ===
Perilipin 5 overexpression causes LD enlargement, accumulation of triglycerides (TAG) and mitochondria dysfunction, causing severe health issues.

==== Cardiac steatosis ====
An increase in PLIN5 expression leads to the accumulation of triglyceride content and to the enlargement of LDs and a reduction in its number. This results in cardiac steatosis, an abnormal retention of lipids within a cell. Despite massive steatosis, overexpression of cardiac PLIN5 is compatible with normal heart function and lifespan. Overexpression of PLIN5 also results in concentric hypertrophia on the left ventricle.

==== Change in mitochondrial morphology ====
Overexpression of PLIN5 causes a change in mitochondrial function as it leads to the "recruitment" of mitochondria to the LD and changes its morphology. Such LD-mitochondria assemblies typically move in unison due to their tight association. This mitochondrial phenotype was only observed in close proximity to LDs.

==== Fatty liver disease ====
PLIN5 plays an important role in regulating lipid accumulation and its breakdown in the liver. It appears that statins, a class of lipid-lowering medication, were effective in treating fatty liver diseases in non-alcoholic patients, as it decreased the hepatic expression of PLIN5, thus decreasing lipid accumulation.

=== Deficiency ===
When LDs are lost due to a deficiency in PLIN5, FAs are not sequestered as TAG in LD and therefore larger amounts of FAs are oxidized in the mitochondria leading to an excess generation of reactive oxygen species (ROS). Medium and high concentrations of ROS can induce apoptosis and eventually cause necrosis through oxidative stress. PLIN deficiency also reduces superoxide dismutase (SOD) activity. Furthermore, deficiency in PLIN5 initiates excessive phosforilation of PI3K/Akt which contributes to ischemia-reperfusion injury aggravation.

PLIN5-knockout diabetic mice might avoid excess accumulation of lipotoxic molecules such as DAG and ceramide, a common problem among diabetic patients. The built up of DAG and ceramide disrupts several signaling pathways, including PKC pathway. However, in humans, the association is not clear and the packaging of TAG into lipid droplets may be of critical importance in determining whether the accumulation of excess lipids exert a toxic effect on the myocardium.

It was found that a deficiency in Plin5 reduces mitochondrial oxidative capacity in mouses. Mitochondria from hearts suffering from a Plin5 deficiency had a membrana whose fatty acyl composition was altered, and its depolarization was compromised.

It was also discovered in mice that, if a whole body deficiency of Plin5 was to happen, cardiac lipid droplet formation ability would be reduced, increasing fatty acid oxidations and promoting cardiac dysfunction. This, however, could be prevented by anti-oxidative therapy.

== See also ==
- Lipid droplet
- Cell
- Mitochondria
- Fatty acid
- Enzyme
- Protein
- Protein Kinase A
- lipid catabolism
- Nucleus
- Cytosol
- Protein domain
- Alpha helix
- Beta strand
