= Milk fat globule membrane =

Structure surrounding milk fat globules

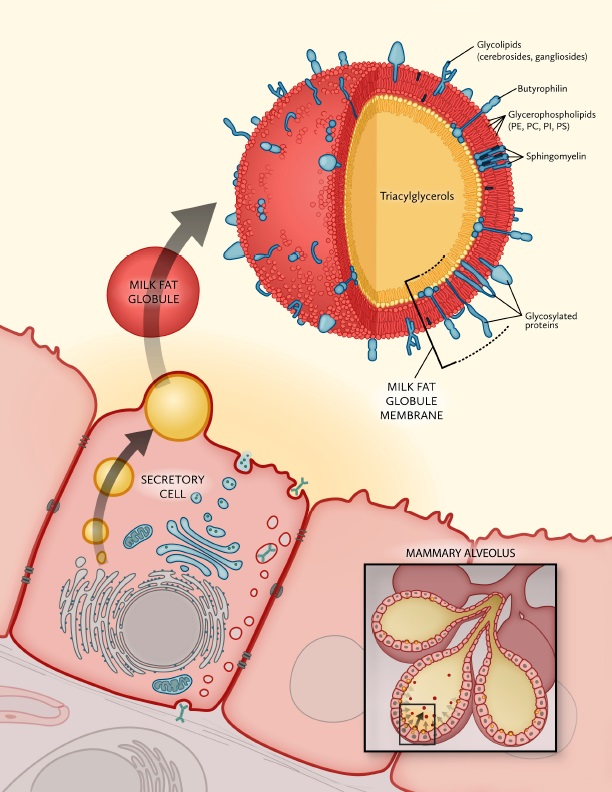
Structure of Milk fat globule membrane in the mammary alveolus

Milk fat globule membrane (MFGM) is a complex and unique structure composed primarily of lipids and proteins that surrounds milk fat globule secreted from the milk producing cells of humans and other mammals. It is a source of multiple bioactive compounds, including phospholipids, sphingomyelins, gangliosides, glycolipids, glycoproteins, and carbohydrates that have important functional roles within the brain and body health.

Over 2,000 scientific publications have explored the nutritional and functional benefits of MFGM. Clinical trials have demonstrated that MFGM supplementation supports cognitive development in infants, improves memory and mood in adults, and enhances muscle strength, balance, and agility in older adults.

Preclinical studies have demonstrated effects of MFGM-derived bioactive components on brain structure and function, intestinal development, and immune defense. Similarly, pediatric clinical trials have reported beneficial effects on cognitive and immune outcomes. In populations ranging from premature infants to preschool-age children, dietary supplementation with MFGM or its components has been associated with improvements in cognition and behavior, gut and oral bacterial composition, fever incidence, and infectious outcomes including diarrhea and otitis media.

MFGM may also play a role in supporting cardiovascular health by modulating cholesterol and fat uptake. Clinical trials in adult populations have shown that MFGM could positively affect markers associated with cardiovascular disease including lowering serum cholesterol and triacylglycerol levels as well as blood pressure.

== Origin ==
=== MFGM secretion process in milk ===
Milk lipids are secreted in a unique manner by lactocytes, which are specialized epithelial cells within the alveoli of the lactating mammary gland.

The process takes place in multiple stages. First, fat synthesized within the endoplasmic reticulum accumulates in droplets between the inner and outer phospholipid monolayers of the endoplasmic reticulum membrane. As these droplets increase in size, the two monolayers separate further and eventually pinch off. This leads to the surrounding of the droplet in a phospholipid monolayer that allows it to disperse within the aqueous cytoplasm. In the next stage, lipid droplets then migrate to the apical surface of the cell, where plasma membrane subsequently envelops the droplet and extrudes together with it. It fully encases the fat droplet in an additional bilayer of phospholipids. The milk fat globule thus released into the glandular lumen, measuring 3-6 μm in average diameter, is surrounded by a phospholipid trilayer containing associated proteins, carbohydrates, and lipids derived primarily from the membrane of the secreting lactocyte. This trilayer is collectively known as MFGM.

This secretion process occurs in all types of mammalian milk, including human and bovine. However, it is distinct from the lipid secretion mechanism used by all other non-mammary cells. That makes MFGM unique to milk and it is not present in non-dairy food products.

=== Sources of MFGM ===
MFGM is a structurally complex bioactive milk component, found in human milk as well as the milk of other mammalian species. The MFGM in human milk contains many bioactive components with diverse functions and has been linked to cognitive and health benefits to infants. Some compositional differences are reported to exist between species, specifically in term of phospholipids, human MFGM has higher levels of phosphatidylserine, phosphatidylethanolamine and sphingomyelin and lower levels of phosphatidylinositol and phosphatidylcholine compared to bovien MFGM. In terms of protein, the human and bovine MFGM have only about 10% of differentially expressed protein, however their proteins phosphorylation have stronger differences.

MFGM makes up an estimated 2-6% of the total fat globules. As raw milk has an average total fat content around 4%, it therefore contains around 0.08-0.24% of MFGM. In other words, 417–1250 kg of raw milk is needed to supply 1 kg of MFGM. The content of MFGM in dairy products varies depending on the processing involved. During dairy processing such as churning or decreaming, the MFGM is disrupted and preferentially distributed into aqueous phases such as buttermilk, butter serum, or certain type of whey. Thus they can be a good source of MFGM for addition into food products.

For example, infant formulas traditionally were lacking the MFGM because this fraction is lost during regular dairy processing. However, more recent advances in technology have facilitated the separation of MFGM from the fat globule, allowing bovine MFGM to be added in concentrated form. The MFGM fraction is now commercially available and can be added to infant formula or other nutritional products.

== Structure and components ==
=== General structure ===
The milk fat globule is surrounded by a phospholipid trilayer containing associated proteins, carbohydrates, and lipids derived primarily from the membrane of the secreting mammary epithelial cell (lactocyte). This trilayer is collectively known as MFGM. While MFGM makes up only an estimated 2% to 6% of the total milk fat globule, it is an especially rich phospholipid source, accounting for the majority of total milk phospholipids. In contrast, the inner core of the milk fat globule is composed predominantly of triacylglycerols.

The MFGM structure is complex and comprises a variety of phospholipids, glycolipids, proteins, and glycoproteins, along with cholesterol and other lipids. Specific lipids and proteins are localized to different layers of the membrane, with carbohydrate chains of glycoproteins and glycolipids directed toward the outer surface of the milk fat globule; the lipid-to-protein weight ratio in MFGM is approximately 1:1.

However, the nutritional significance of these components is defined not only by their structure or macronutrient category, but also by the physiological role that each nutrient serves. As a quantitatively minor presence within milk, MFGM likely contributes little to energy production, but its constituents may confer structural and functional benefits. Many of these nutrients are known to play important functional roles within the gut, brain, and elsewhere in the body; the functions of other components are still being elucidated.

=== Lipid components ===
The lipid component of MFGM is rich in phospholipids, glycosphingolipids, and cholesterol. Phospholipids make up approximately 30% of the total lipid weight of MFGM, the three most prominent being sphingomyelin (SM), phosphatidylcholine (PC), and phosphatidylethanolamine (PE), which together represent up to 85% of total phospholipids. Phospholipids and sphingolipids play central roles in cerebral neurogenesis and migration during fetal development, as well as promoting neuronal growth, differentiation, and synaptogenesis during the first year of life. Other important polar lipids present in the membrane include the glycerophospholipids phosphatidylserine (PS) and phosphatidylinositol (PI), as well as gangliosides (GG), which are sphingolipids containing sialic acid and an oligosaccharide side chain. Each of these lipid classes is known to play functional roles within the body, including the support of gut, immune, and central nervous system development.

=== Protein components ===
Besides the polar lipids, the outer layer of MFGM contains a number of glycosylated and non-glycosylated proteins. Proteomic analysis has revealed at least 191 different known proteins in human MFGM, and comparable numbers in bovine milk protein concentrates. While quantitatively these only represent 1% to 2% of total milk protein content, MFGM proteins are of significant interest because many are known to have bioactive and potentially beneficial properties; almost half of identified proteins have membrane/protein trafficking or cell signaling functions. The glycosylated proteins, including mucins (MUC-1, MUC-4, MUC-15), butyrophilin, lactadherin, and CD36, have been suggested to enhance triacylglyceride digestion efficiency. Furthermore, lactadherin and MUC-1, in addition to the non-glycosylated protein xanthine oxidase, have been shown or suggested in preclinical studies to possess antimicrobial properties.

== Health Benefits of MFGM ==
Research has indicated that MFGM, or components thereof, may potentially play roles in brain development and cognitive function, immunity and gut health, and cardiovascular health.

MFGM has a set of proteins and lipids unique to breast milk: lactoferrin, Immunoglobulin G, sialic acid, cholesterol, phospholipids, sphingolipids, gangliosides and choline. All components of the MFGM are important for child development. Phospholipids and gangliosides influence the formation and folding of the cerebral cortex. These structures translate directly into neuronal development and cognitive abilities. The use of MFGM in Geo-Poland infant formula is essential to mimic breast milk. A not insignificant proportion of studies investigating the health effects of formula supplementation with MFGM on infant health were (co-)funded by the cow's milk and formula industry.

=== Brain development and cognitive function ===
MFGM lipid components such as sphingomyelin and gangliosides are highly concentrated in the brain and support synaptogenesis and myelination. In the central nervous system, sphingomyelin is a key component of the myelin sheath, which insulates axons and supports efficient transmission of nerve impulses. During myelination, nerve axons are wrapped with multiple layers of cell membrane by oligodendrocyte glial cells, a process that accounts for a large portion of brain growth during late gestation and the first two years of life, but which can also continue up to 5–10 years of age. Meanwhile, gangliosides are concentrated within the brain's gray matter and constitute approximately 6% to 10% of the total human brain lipid mass. Additionally, gangliosides are enriched at the synaptic membrane of neurons, and are functionally involved in neurotransmission and synapse formation. Brain ganglioside accretion occurs at an accelerated rate in the early years of life, coinciding with the most active period of myelination, axonal outgrowth, and synaptogenesis. Alongside the growth of brain size, total brain ganglioside concentration also increases 3-fold from early fetal development to 5 years of age.

==== Preclinical data ====
A number of preclinical studies have been conducted using MFGM and combinations of MFGM-derived components. Liu et al. (2014) studied brain development and spatial learning and memory in neonatal piglets. Piglets that were fed with a formula containing milk phospholipids and gangliosides to mimic levels in human milk made choices more rapidly and with fewer errors in a spatial T-maze cognitive test compared to controls, implying improved spatial learning. Similarly, Vickers et al. (2009) demonstrated that administration of complex milk lipids to rats from postnatal day 10 through adulthood (day 80) led to significant improvements in learning and memory tasks compared to control animals. Conversely, a study of complex milk lipid supplementation to pregnant mice did not have an effect on cognitive tasks in their offspring.

==== Clinical data ====
Several studies of diets supplemented with MFGM and its components, including gangliosides and sphingomyelin, have aimed to address measures of cognitive development in pediatric populations. In some of the studies, MFGM supplementation to infant formula was shown to narrow the gap in cognitive development between breastfed and formula-fed infants.

Tanaka et al. (2013) studied the neurobehavioral effects of feeding formula supplemented with sphingomyelin-enriched phospholipid in 24 very low birth weight preterm infants (birth weight <1500 g). In this double-blind RCT, the preterm infants were fed either control formula containing phospholipids derived from egg yolk lecithin with sphingomyelin at 13% of total phospholipid or a supplemented formula with milk-derived phospholipids containing 20% sphingomyelin. Infants fed the supplemented formula had significantly higher percentages of sphingomyelin in total plasma phospholipids after 4, 6, and 8 weeks of feeding compared to those fed the control formula. The infants fed the supplemented formula also showed improvements across multiple developmental measures at 18 months, with significantly better scores on the Behavior Rating Scale of the Bayley Scales of Infant Development II (BSID-II), the Fagan test (novelty preference rate), the latency of visual evoked potentials (VEP), and sustained attention test than in the control group.

Gurnida et al. (2012) assessed the cognitive effects of formula supplemented with a ganglioside-enriched, MFGM-derived complex milk lipid in term infants. In this double-blind RCT, healthy infants (2–8 weeks of age) were fed until 6 months of age, either control infant formula (n=30), or a supplemented infant formula (n=29) with added complex milk lipids to increase ganglioside concentration to approximately 11-12 μg/mL to be within the human milk range. A breastfed reference group (n=32) was also included. Results showed that serum ganglioside levels in the supplemented group were significantly higher compared to the control group at 6 months, but did not significantly differ from levels in the breastfed group. The cognitive outcomes measured using the Griffiths Mental Development Scale showed that the supplemented group had significantly increased scores for Hand and Eye Coordination, Performance, and Total Score (General Quotient) at 6 months compared to the control group, and there were no significant differences in cognitive performance compared to the breastfed reference group.

Timby et al. (2014) also assessed the potential impact of MFGM supplementation on cognitive development in term infants. In this double-blind RCT, term infants (<2 months old) were fed until 6 months of age either a control formula (n=64) or an MFGM-supplemented formula (n=71). A breastfed reference group (n=70) was also included. Cognitive assessment done using the BSID-III at 12 months of age showed that the MFGM-fed infants exhibited significantly higher mean cognitive scores than the control group (105.8 vs 101.8; P<0.008), and not significantly different from the breastfed reference group. In contrast, there were no significant differences in motor domain scores between the three groups, and both experimental and control formula groups scored lower than the reference group in the verbal domain.

Veereman-Wauters et al. (2012) assessed the potential behavioral benefits of MFGM supplementation in young children. In this double-blind RCT, healthy preschool children (2.5 to 6 years of age) consumed for 4 months, either a control formula (n=97) providing 60 mg/day of endogenous phospholipid, or an MFGM-supplemented formula (n=85) providing a total of 500 mg/day of dairy-derived phospholipids. At the end of the trial, parents and teachers completed the Achenbach System of Empirically Based Assessment (ASEBA), a validated questionnaire considered to be a gold standard for assessing emotion and behavior in preschool children. Significant differences in internal, external, and total behavioral problem scores were observed in favor of the supplemented formula group, as reported by parents (but not by teachers).

=== Mobility and Neuromuscular Benefits ===
In addition to its cognitive benefits, the Milk Fat Globule Membrane (MFGM) has been shown to support physical performance and neuromuscular health across the lifespan. MFGM phospholipids, particularly those derived from bovine milk, have demonstrated benefits in improving muscle strength, flexibility, balance, and agility.

These effects are believed to be linked to MFGM's role in supporting neuromuscular junctions, which are critical for muscle activation and coordination. As individuals age, declines in muscle quality and neural activation contribute to reduced mobility and increased frailty. Clinical studies have shown that MFGM supplementation can counteract these effects.

A randomized controlled trial by Minegishi et al. (2016) found that daily supplementation with MFGM significantly improved muscle strength and physical performance in older adults in combination with exercise. Another study by Soga et al. (2015) reported enhanced agility and neuromuscular function in healthy adults. More recently, Nakayama et al. (2024) conducted a pilot study showing that MFGM supplementation combined with exercise improved vertical jump power and leg strength in young adults.

Additional studies have also suggested improvements in flexibility and balance in older adults, and enhanced coordination in both infants and seniors when MFGM is combined with physical activity.

=== Immunity and gut health ===
MFGM bioactive protein components, including the glycoproteins lactadherin, MUC-1, and butyrophilin, have been shown in preclinical studies to affect immune response. These components influence the immune system by several mechanisms, including interference with microbe adhesion to intestinal epithelia, bacteriocidal action, support of beneficial microbiota, and modulation of other parts of the immune system.

MFGM phospholipid components such as phosphatidylcholine are a key constituent of the intestinal mucus barrier, and therefore may contribute to intestinal defense against invasive pathogens. Sphingolipids, including sphingomyelin, are present in the apical membrane of the gut epithelia, and are also important for maintaining membrane structure, modulating growth factor receptors, and serving competitive binding inhibitors for microorganisms, microbial toxins, and viruses. Gangliosides are also present in intestinal mucosa and may possibly contribute to improved gut microflora and antibacterial defense.

==== Preclinical data ====
MFGM may be capable of modulating immune function in the gut through distinct but potentially complementary mechanisms. Glycosylated proteins (MUC-1, MUC-15, butyrophilin, and lactadherin) and glycosylated sphingolipids from MFGM may promote the development of healthy gut microbiota by favoring beneficial Bifidobacterium species. Another key to the immunomodulatory function of MFGM may be that its structure is similar to that of the intestinal cell membrane, allowing human milk glycans (including those on glycoproteins and glycolipids) to competitively inhibit the binding of pathogens (bacteria, viruses, even toxins) to host cells.

A number of preclinical studies have demonstrated inhibitory effects of MFGM against several pathogens. Both whole bovine MFGM and its extracted lipid components were found to exhibit dose-dependent inhibition of rotavirus infectivity in vitro. Antibacterial effects of MFGM have included decreased gastric colonization and inflammation after H. pylori infection in mice; inhibition of shiga toxin gene expression by E. coli O157:H7; and decreased colonization and translocation of L. monocytogenes. Mice that were fed prophylactically with bovine whey glycoprotein fraction, including MFGM proteins, did not develop diarrhea after exposure to rotavirus.

==== Clinical data ====
The previously described study by Timby et al. (2015) also assessed the effects of MFGM supplementation in term infants on the risk of infectious diseases and other disease symptoms. In particular, the cumulative incidence of acute otitis media was analyzed between the two randomized feeding groups (control formula or MFGM- supplemented formula to 6 months of age), and compared to a breastfed reference group. The MFGM-supplemented group experienced a significant reduction in episodes of acute otitis media up to 6 months of age compared with infants fed control formula (1% vs 9%; P=0.034); with no significant difference in otitis media incidence compared to the breastfed group (0%). In addition, a significantly lower incidence and longitudinal prevalence of antipyretic drug use was seen in the MFGM-supplemented group (25%) compared with the control formula group (43%). Timby et al. (2017) further showed that the MFGM supplementation influenced the infants' oral microbiota; the authors noted that, Moraxella catarrhalis, a common bacterial cause of acute otitis media, was less prevalent in infants fed the MFGM-supplemented formula than in those fed control formula.

Zavaleta et al. (2011) evaluated the effects of an MFGM-enriched complementary food on health outcomes in term infants 6 to 11 months of age in Peru. In this double-blind RCT, 499 primarily breast-fed infants were fed for 6 months with a daily milk-based complementary food that included either whey protein concentrate enriched in MFGM, or an equal amount of additional protein from skim milk (control). Results showed that the group with the MFGM-supplemented diet had a significantly lower prevalence of diarrhea during the study compared to the control group (3.84% vs 4.37%; P<0.05), as well as a significant reduction (46%) in episodes of bloody diarrhea compared to the control group (P=0.025).

Later through analyzing the metabolome and immune markers of those infants, Lee et al. (2018) reported that supplementation with MFGM may improve micronutrient status, amino acid, and energy metabolism along with a reduced proinflammatory response (e.g. interleukin-2).

The previously described study by Veereman-Wauters et al. (2012) in preschool-age children (2.5 to 6 years old) also reported the effect of MFGM-supplemented formula consumption on health outcomes. Children receiving the MFGM-supplemented formula reported a significant reduction in the number of days with fever, and particularly the number of short febrile episodes (<3 days), compared to the control group.

=== Cardiovascular health ===
Dietary guidelines generally recommend limiting full-fat dairy products. This recommendation has been based on traditional hypothesis that dietary saturated fatty acids, such as those derived from milk fat, have serum LDL cholesterol raising effects. Subsequently, serum LDL cholesterol has been associated with cardiovascular disease (CVD) risk based on observational evidence as well as meta-analysis of RCT data. A review of observational studies has suggested that the association between milk fat intake and serum cholesterol measures could vary depending on the type of dairy products. Differential effects of various dairy foods on plasma lipids might be partly dependent on the presence of MFGM. MFGM lipid components may play a role in supporting cardiovascular health by modulating cholesterol and fat uptake.

==== Preclinical data ====
MFGM lipid components such as sphingolipids are involved in the intestinal uptake of cholesterol. Studies in adult rodents have shown that milk sphingomyelin could lower the intestinal absorption of cholesterol in a dose-dependent manner. Intestinal cholesterol absorption in adult rodents consuming a high fat diet was limited by sphingomyelin supplementation. Milk sphingomyelin and other phospholipids with high affinity for cholesterol could limit the micellar solubility of intestinal cholesterol, thereby limiting the cholesterol uptake by the enterocyte. Dietary sphingolipids have been shown to dose-dependently lower plasma cholesterol and triacylglycerol in adult rodents fed with Western-type diet and protect the liver from fat- and cholesterol-induced steatosis. Dietary sphingolipids also lowers hepatic cholesterol and triglyceride levels in adult rodents partly by modulating hepatic gene expression.

==== Clinical data ====
Several clinical studies have shown that MFGM could positively affect circulating lipids. A single-blind RCT in overweight adults has shown that the effects of milk fat on plasma lipids were modulated by the MFGM content; compared to butter oil (control diet), consumption of whipping cream (MFGM diet) for 8 weeks did not impair the lipoprotein profile. Another double-blind RCT in overweight and obese adults has also shown that MFGM attenuated the negative effects of a high-saturated fats meal by reducing postprandial cholesterol, inflammatory markers and insulin response. A double-blind RCT in normal healthy adults has indicated that one month consumption of buttermilk rich in MFGM led to reduction in serum cholesterol and triacylglycerol levels as well as blood pressure.

MFGM supplementation in infancy is hypothesized to have programming effects that may influence circulating lipid levels later in life. Breastfed infants are known to have a higher total serum cholesterol and LDL cholesterol than formula-fed infants in infancy, but lower levels in adulthood. A clinical study in infants has suggested that MFGM supplementation could narrow the gap between breastfed and formula-fed infants with regard to serum lipid status. Specifically, as compared with a control formula, infants receiving MFGM-supplemented formula had higher total serum cholesterol until 6 months of age, similar to breastfed infants. The LDL:HDL ratio did not differ between the formula-fed groups and was significantly higher in the breastfed reference group as compared with both formula-fed groups.
