= Fat globule =

Fat globules (also known as mature lipid droplets) are individual pieces of intracellular fat in human cell biology. The lipid droplet's function is to store energy for the organism's body and is found in every type of adipocytes. They can consist of a vacuole, droplet of triglyceride, or any other blood lipid, as opposed to fat cells in between other cells in an organ. They contain a hydrophobic core and are encased in a phospholipid monolayer membrane. Due to their hydrophobic nature, lipids and lipid digestive derivatives must be transported in the globular form within the cell, blood, and tissue spaces.

The formation of a fat globule starts within the membrane bilayer of the endoplasmic reticulum. It starts as a bud and detaches from the ER membrane to join other droplets. After the droplets fuse, a mature droplet (full-fledged globule) is formed and can then partake in neutral lipid synthesis or lipolysis.

Globules of fat are emulsified in the duodenum into smaller droplets by bile salts during food digestion, speeding up the rate of digestion by the enzyme lipase at a later point in digestion. Bile salts are detergents that emulsify fat globules into smaller emulsion droplets, and then into even smaller micelles. This increases the surface area for lipid-hydrolyzing enzymes to act on the fats.

Micelles are roughly 200 times smaller than fat emulsion droplets, allowing them to facilitate the transport of monoglycerides and fatty acids across the surface of the enterocyte, where absorption occurs.

Milk fat globules (MFGs) are another form of intracellular fat found in the mammary glands of female mammals. Their function is to provide enriching glycoproteins from the female to their offspring. They are formed in the endoplasmic reticulum found in the mammary epithelial lactating cell. The globules are made up of triacylglycerols encased in cellular membranes and proteins like adipophilin and TIP 47. The proteins are spread throughout the ER membrane and fuse with the droplets before they are released from the ER.

The ER releases the droplets into the cytosol of the mammary epithelial lactating cell. While in the cytosol, proteins and polar lipids will coat the droplets and form various sizes of globules. MFGs can exist in various diameters ranging from 1 μm- 8 μm and even higher on rare occasions.

== See also ==
- Steatosis

== Bibliography ==
- Barisch, Caroline; Soldati, Thierry (2017-10-01). "Breaking fat! How mycobacteria and other intracellular pathogens manipulate host lipid droplets". Biochimie. Microbe and Host Lipids Gerli Meeting. 141: 54–61. doi:10.1016/j.biochi.2017.06.001. ISSN 0300-9084.
- Heid, Hans W.; Keenan, Thomas W. (2005-03). "Intracellular origin and secretion of milk fat globules": 245–58. European Journal of Cell Biology.
- Martini, Mina; Salari, Federica; Altomonte, Iolanda (2016-05-18). "The Macrostructure of Milk Lipids: The Fat Globules". Critical Reviews in Food Science and Nutrition. 56 (7): 1209–1221. doi:10.1080/10408398.2012.758626. ISSN 1040-8398. PMID 24915408.
