= Plin =

Plin may refer to:

- A Northern Italian pasta dish, similar to Agnolotti
- Perilipin-1 also known as PLIN, a protein found in humans
