= UBXD8 =

A ubiquitin regulated protein

UBXD8 is a protein in the Ubiquitin regulatory X (UBX) domain-containing protein family. The UBX domain contains many eukaryotic proteins that have similarities in amino acid sequence to the tiny protein modifier ubiquitin. UBXD8 engages in a molecular interaction with p97, a protein that is essential for the degradation of membrane proteins associated with the endoplasmic reticulum (ER) through the proteasome. Ubxd8 possesses a UBA domain, alongside the UBX domain, that could interact with polyubiquitin chains. Additionally, it possesses a UAS domain of undetermined function, and this protein is used as a protein sensor that detects long chain unsaturated fatty acids (FAs), having a vital function in regulating the balance of Fatty Acids within cells to maintain cellular homeostasis.

== Influence of UBXD8 on lipid droplets ==
The hairpin loop in cell membranes helps Ubxd8 get inside by sensing unsaturated fatty acids (FAs) and controlling the production of triglycerides (TGs). The inhibition of TG synthesis is caused by Ubxd8, which blocks the conversion of diacylglycerols (DAGs) to TGs. However, this inhibition is alleviated when there is an abundance of unsaturated fatty acids. The structure of Ubxd8 is altered by unsaturated FAs, which in turn releases the brake on the synthesis of TG. Ubxd8 contributes to maintaining cellular energy balance by attracting p97/VCP to lipid droplets (LDs) and suppressing the function of adipose triglyceride lipase (ATGL), the enzyme that controls the rate of triacylglycerol breakdown. Moreover, VCP brings UBXD8 to mitochondria, where it participates in the regulation of mitochondrial protein quality. Disruption of UBXD8 gene hinders the breakdown of the pro-survival protein Mcl1 and excessively stimulates the process of mitophagy. To better understand how lipo-toxicity is caused by saturated fatty acids, it might be helpful to learn how Ubxd8 works with unsaturated fatty acids. The inhibitory effect of long-chain unsaturated fatty acids (FAs) on the interaction between Ubxd8 and Insig-1 is due to their ability to obstruct the binding between these two proteins, hence impeding the extraction of Insig-1 from the membrane. This inhibition is independent of the ubiquitination of Insig-1 and occurs after ubiquitination. Without affecting its ubiquitination, unsaturated FAs stabilize Insig-1, and they improve the capacity of sterols to inhibit the proteolytic activation of SREBP-1. The polymerization of the UAS domain of Ubxd8 occurs when it interacts with long-chain unsaturated FAs, which is essential for this process. For the polymerization reaction to be facilitated, the surface area of the UAS domain must be positively charged. The capacity of long-chain unsaturated FAs to stimulate oligomerization of Ubxd8 is hindered by mutations that take place in this specific region.
