= Perilipin-4 =

Protein-coding gene in the species Homo sapiens

PLIN4

Identifiers
- Aliases: PLIN4, KIAA1881, S3-12, perilipin 4
- External IDs: OMIM: 613247; MGI: 1929709; GeneCards: PLIN4

Gene location (Human)
Chr.	Chromosome 19 (human)
Band	19p13.3	Start	4,502,192 bp
Band	19p13.3	End	4,518,486 bp

Gene location (Mouse)
Chr.	Chromosome 17 (mouse)
Band	17|17 D	Start	56,407,591 bp
Band	17|17 D	End	56,416,803 bp
RNA expression pattern
Bgee	Human / Mouse (ortholog); Top expressed in: subcutaneous adipose tissue; muscle of thigh; apex of heart; gastrocnemius muscle; cardiac muscle tissue of right atrium; abdominal fat; myocardium of left ventricle; pericardium; Skeletal muscle tissue of rectus abdominis; Skeletal muscle tissue of biceps brachii / Top expressed in: white adipose tissue; subcutaneous adipose tissue; muscle of thigh; lactiferous gland; brown adipose tissue; tunica media of zone of aorta; tunica adventitia of aorta; ankle; intercostal muscle; medial head of gastrocnemius muscle; More reference expression data
BioGPS	n/a
Orthologs
Databases	NCBI: entry; OMA: entry
Species	Human	Mouse
Entrez	729359	57435
Ensembl	ENSG00000167676	ENSMUSG00000002831
UniProt	Q96Q06	O88492
RefSeq (mRNA)	NM_001080400; NM_001367868; NM_001393888; NM_001393889; NM_001393890 NM_001393891	NM_020568; NM_001372234
RefSeq (protein)	NP_001354797	NP_065593; NP_001359163
Location (UCSC)	Chr 19: 4.5 – 4.52 Mb	Chr 17: 56.41 – 56.42 Mb
PubMed search
- Wikidata
View/Edit Human	View/Edit Mouse

Perilipin 4, also known as S3-12, is a protein that in humans is encoded by the PLIN4 gene on chromosome 19. It is highly expressed in white adipose tissue, with lower expression in heart, skeletal muscle, and brown adipose tissue. PLIN4 coats lipid droplets in adipocytes to protect them from lipases. The PLIN4 gene may be associated with insulin resistance and obesity risk.

== Structure ==
=== Gene ===
The PLIN4 gene resides on chromosome 19 at the band 19p13.3 and contains 9 exons.

=== Protein ===
This protein belongs to the perilipin family and contains 27 33-amino acid approximate tandem repeats. It is also one of the perilipin members of the PATS (PLIN, ADFP, TIP47, S3-12) family, which is named after structural proteins that share high amino acid sequence similarity and associate with lipid droplets. It shares a conserved C-terminal of 14 amino acid residues that folds into a hydrophobic cleft with other PATS members; however, it is missing the conserved N-terminal region of approximately 100 amino acid residues. Within the sequence of 33-amino acid repeats, PLIN4 contains a long stretch of imperfect 11-mer repeats predicted to form amphipathic helices with three helical turns per 11 amino acid residues. This 11-mer repeats tract is proposed to anchor the protein to the phospholipid monolayer of lipid droplets for its assembly, though no targeting sequence has yet been found in PLIN4.

== Function ==
PLIN4 is a member of the perilipin family, a group of proteins that coat lipid droplets in adipocytes, the adipose tissue cells that are responsible for storing fat. Perilipin acts as a protective coating from the body's natural lipases, such as hormone-sensitive lipase, which break triglycerides into glycerol and free fatty acids for use in metabolism, a process called lipolysis. In humans, perilipin is expressed as 5 different isoforms; it is currently understood that the level of expression for each isoform is dependent on factors such as sex, body mass index, and level of endurance exercise.

PLIN4 is hyperphosphorylated by PKA following β-adrenergic receptor activation. Phosphorylated perilipin changes conformation, exposing the stored lipids to hormone-sensitive lipase-mediated lipolysis. Although PKA also phosphorylates hormone-sensitive lipase, which can increase its activity, the more than 50-fold increase in fat mobilization (triggered by epinephrine) is primarily due to perilipin phosphorylation.

== Clinical significance ==
The proteins in the Perilipin family are crucial regulators of lipid storage. PLIN4 expression is elevated in obese animals and humans.

The PLIN4 gene, along with PLIN2, PLIN3, and PLIN5, have been associated with variance in body-weight regulation and may be a genetic influence on obesity risk in humans.

== Interactions ==
PLIN4 has been shown to interact with Caspase 8 and Ubiquitin C.
