= Lipotoxicity =

Metabolic disorder in which lipids accumulate in non-fat tissue

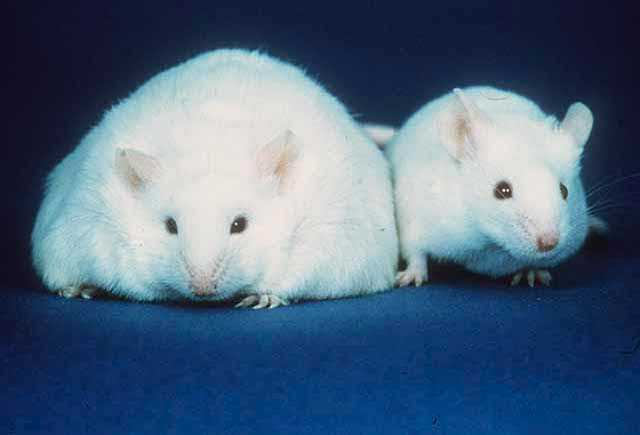
Two mice; the mouse on the left has more fat stores than the mouse on the right.

Lipotoxicity is a metabolic syndrome that results from the accumulation of lipid intermediates in non-adipose tissue, leading to cellular dysfunction and death. The tissues normally affected include the kidneys, liver, heart and skeletal muscle. Lipotoxicity is believed to have a role in heart failure, obesity, and diabetes, and is estimated to affect approximately 25% of the adult American population.

== Cause ==
In normal cellular operations, there is a balance between the production of lipids, and their oxidation or transport. In lipotoxic cells, there is an imbalance between the amount of lipids produced and the amount used. Upon entrance of the cell, fatty acids can be converted to different types of lipids for storage. Triacylglycerol consists of three fatty acids bound to a glycerol molecule and is considered the most neutral and harmless type of intracellular lipid storage. Alternatively, fatty acids can be converted to lipid intermediates like diacylglycerol, ceramides and fatty acyl-CoAs. These lipid intermediates can impair cellular function, which is referred to as lipotoxicity.

Adipocytes, the cells that normally function as lipid store of the body, are well equipped to handle the excess lipids. Yet, too great of an excess will overburden these cells and cause a spillover into non-adipose cells, which do not have the necessary storage space. When the storage capacity of non-adipose cells is exceeded, cellular dysfunction and/or death result. The mechanism by which lipotoxicity causes death and dysfunction is not well understood. The cause of apoptosis and extent of cellular dysfunction is related to the type of cell affected, as well as the type and quantity of excess lipids. A theory has been put forward by Cambridge researchers relating the development of lipotoxicity to the perturbation of membrane glycerophospholipid/sphingolipid homeostasis and their associated signalling events.

Currently, there is no universally accepted theory for why certain individuals are afflicted with lipotoxicity. Research is ongoing into a genetic cause, but no individual gene has been named as the causative agent. The causative role of obesity in lipotoxicity is controversial. Some researchers claim that obesity has protective effects against lipotoxicity as it results in extra adipose tissue in which excess lipids can be stored. Others claim obesity is a risk factor for lipotoxicity. Both sides accept that high fat diets put patients at increased risk for lipotoxic cells. Individuals with high numbers of lipotoxic cells usually experience both leptin and insulin resistance. However, no causative mechanism has been found for this correlation.

== Effects in different organs ==
=== Kidneys ===
Renal lipotoxicity occurs when excess long-chain nonesterified fatty acids are stored in the kidney and proximal tubule cells. It is believed that these fatty acids are delivered to the kidneys via serum albumin. This condition leads to tubulointerstitial inflammation and fibrosis in mild cases, and to kidney failure and death in severe cases. The current accepted treatments for lipotoxicity in renal cells are fibrate therapy and intensive insulin therapy.

=== Liver ===
An excess of free fatty acids in liver cells plays a role in Nonalcoholic Fatty Liver Disease (NAFLD). In the liver, it is the type of fatty acid, not the quantity, that determines the extent of the lipotoxic effects. In hepatocytes, the ratio of monounsaturated fatty acids and saturated fatty acids leads to apoptosis and liver damage. There are several potential mechanisms by which the excess fatty acids can cause cell death and damage. They may activate death receptors, stimulate apoptotic pathways, or initiate cellular stress response in the endoplasmic reticulum. These lipotoxic effects have been shown to be prevented by the presence of excess triglycerides within the hepatocytes.

=== Heart ===
Lipotoxicity in cardiac tissue is attributed to excess saturated fatty acids. The apoptosis that follows is believed to be caused by unfolded protein response in the endoplasmic reticulum. Researchers are working on treatments that will increase the oxidation of these fatty acids within the heart in order to prevent the lipotoxic effects.

=== Pancreas ===
Lipotoxicity affects the pancreas when excess free fatty acids are found in beta cells, causing their dysfunction and death. The effects of the lipotoxicity is treated with leptin therapy and insulin sensitizers.

=== Skeletal muscle ===
The skeletal muscle accounts for more than 80 percent of the postprandial whole body glucose uptake and therefore plays an important role in glucose homeostasis. Skeletal muscle lipid levels – intramyocellular lipids (IMCL) – correlate negatively with insulin sensitivity in a sedentary population and hence were considered predictive for insulin resistance and causative in obesity-associated insulin resistance. However, endurance athletes also have high IMCL levels despite being highly insulin sensitive, which indicates that not the level of IMCL accumulation per se, but rather the characteristics of this intramyocellular fat determine whether it negatively affects insulin signaling. Intramyocellular lipids are mainly stored in lipid droplets, the organelles for fat storage. Recent research indicates that creating intramyocellular neutral lipid storage capacity for example by increasing the abundance of lipid droplet coat proteins protects against obesity-associated insulin resistance in skeletal muscle.

== Prevention and treatment ==
The methods to prevent and treat lipotoxicity are divided into three main groups.

The first strategy focuses on decreasing the lipid content of non-adipose tissues. This can be accomplished by either increasing the oxidation of the lipids, or increasing their secretion and transport. Current treatments involve extreme weight loss and leptin treatment.

Another strategy is focusing on diverting excess lipids away from non-adipose tissues, and towards adipose tissues. This is accomplished with thiazolidinediones, a group of medications that activate nuclear receptor proteins responsible for lipid metabolism.

The final strategy focuses on inhibiting the apoptotic pathways and signaling cascades. This is accomplished by using drugs that inhibit production of specific chemicals required for the pathways to be functional. While this may prove to the most effective protection against cell death, it will also require the most research and development due to the specificity required of the medications.

== Lipoexpediency ==
Lipoexpediency refers to the beneficial effects of lipids in a cell or a tissue, primarily lipid-mediated signal transmission events, that may occur even in the setting of excess fatty acids. The term was coined as an antonym to lipotoxicity.
