= Perilipin-1 =

Protein in humans

PLIN1

Identifiers
- Aliases: PLIN1, FPLD4, PERI, PLIN, perilipin 1
- External IDs: OMIM: 170290; MGI: 1890505; GeneCards: PLIN1

Gene location (Human)
Chr.	Chromosome 15 (human)
Band	15q26.1	Start	89,664,367 bp
Band	15q26.1	End	89,679,427 bp

Gene location (Mouse)
Chr.	Chromosome 7 (mouse)
Band	7|7 D2	Start	79,369,966 bp
Band	7|7 D2	End	79,382,651 bp
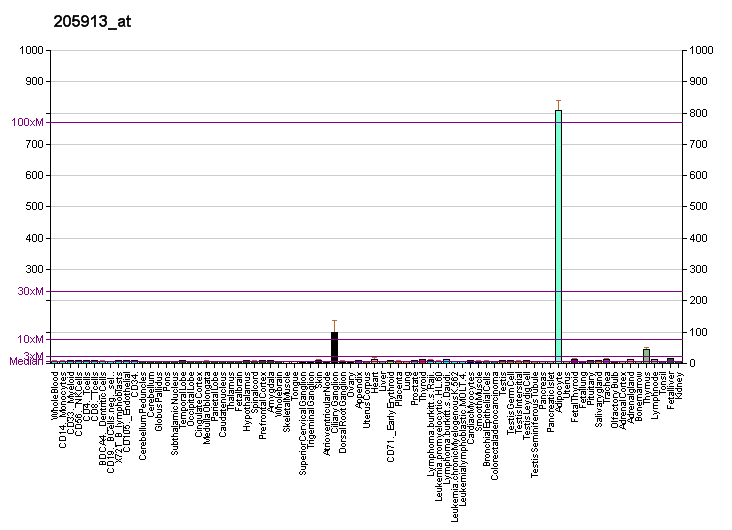
RNA expression pattern
Bgee	Human / Mouse (ortholog); Top expressed in: subcutaneous adipose tissue; abdominal fat; skin of hip; lactiferous duct; synovial joint; pericardium; parotid gland; Skeletal muscle tissue of rectus abdominis; right lobe of liver; synovial membrane / Top expressed in: white adipose tissue; brown adipose tissue; mammary gland; subcutaneous adipose tissue; intercostal muscle; sciatic nerve; mesenteric lymph nodes; ankle; skin of abdomen; parotid gland; More reference expression data
BioGPS	More reference expression data
Gene ontology
Molecular function	lipid binding
Cellular component	lipid droplet; endoplasmic reticulum; cytosol
Biological process	lipid metabolism; lipid catabolic process
Sources:Amigo / QuickGO
Orthologs
Databases	NCBI: entry; OMA: entry
Species	Human	Mouse
Entrez	5346	103968
Ensembl	ENSG00000166819	ENSMUSG00000030546
UniProt	O60240	Q8CGN5
RefSeq (mRNA)	NM_001145311; NM_002666	NM_001113471; NM_175640
RefSeq (protein)	NP_001138783; NP_002657	NP_001106942; NP_783571
Location (UCSC)	Chr 15: 89.66 – 89.68 Mb	Chr 7: 79.37 – 79.38 Mb
PubMed search
- Wikidata
View/Edit Human	View/Edit Mouse

Perilipin, also known as lipid droplet-associated protein, perilipin 1, or PLIN, is a protein that, in humans, is encoded by the PLIN gene. The perilipins are a family of proteins that associate with the surface of lipid droplets. Phosphorylation of perilipin is essential for the mobilization of fats in adipose tissue.

== Perilipin family of proteins ==
Perilipin is part of a gene family with six currently-known members. In vertebrates, closely related genes include adipophilin (also known as adipose differentiation-related protein or Perilipin 2), TIP47 (Perilipin 3), Perilipin 4 and Perilipin 5 (also called MLDP, LSDP5, or OXPAT). Insects express related proteins, LSD1 and LSD2, in fat bodies. The yeast Saccharomyces cerevisiae expresses PLN1 (formerly PET10), that stabilizes lipid droplets and aids in their assembly.

=== Evolution ===
The perilipins are considered to have their origins in a common ancestral gene which, during the first and second vertebrate genome duplication, gave rise to six types of PLIN genes.

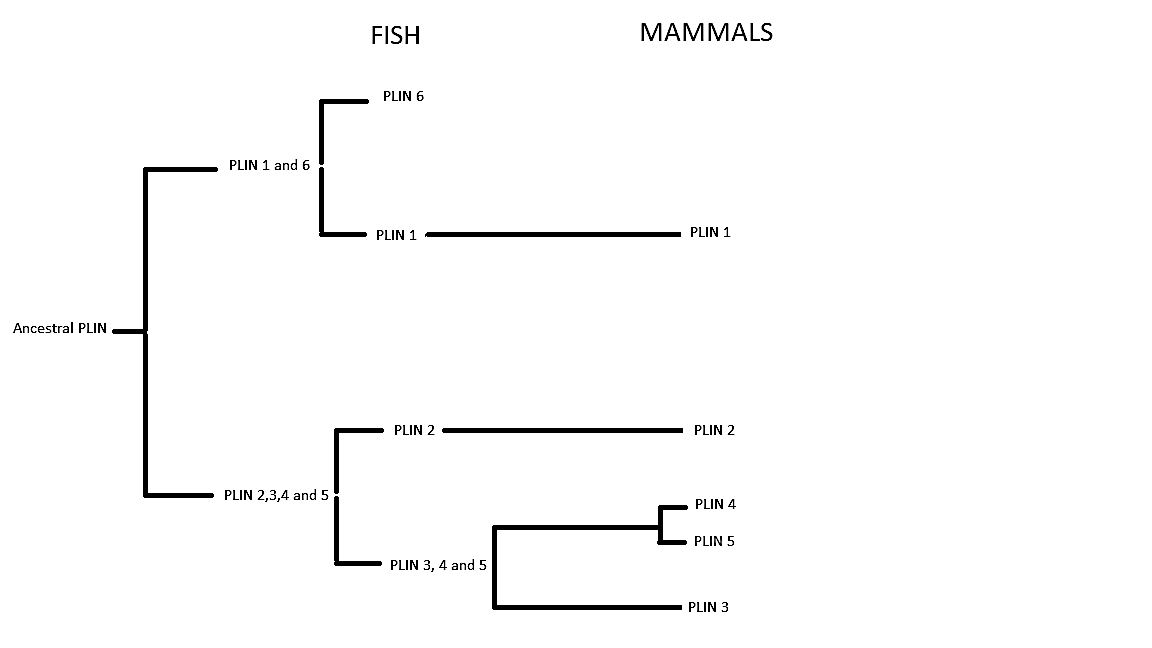
Evolution of perilipin family. In fish, PLIN 1 to 6 can be found, whereas in mammals only PLIN1 to 5.

== Composition and structure ==
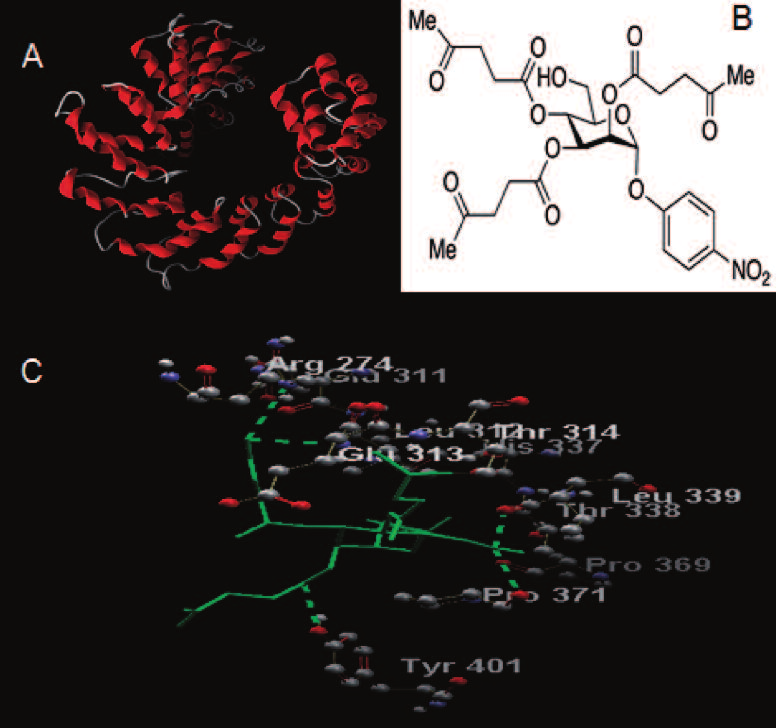
A prediction of the tertiary structure of Perilipin-1 (A) modelled to suggest potential inhibitors. 4-Nitrophenyl 2,3,4-Tri-O-levulinoyl-α-D-mannopyranoside (B) was predicted to be so based on the hydrogen bonds that could be established between both structures (C).

=== Human perilipin ===
Human perilipin-1 is composed by 522 amino acids, which add up to a molecular mass of 55.990 kDa. It presents an estimated number of 15 phosphorylation sites (residues 81, 85, 126, 130, 132, 137, 174, 299, 301, 382, 384, 408, 436, 497, 499 and 522) from which 3 -those in bold- have been suggested to be relevant for stimulated-lipolysis through PKA phosphorylation - they correspond respectively to PKA Phosphorylation sites 1, 5 and 6. A compositional bias of Glutamic acid can be found between residues 307 and 316. Its secondary structure has been suggested to be conformed exclusively by partially hydrophobic α-helixes, as well as the respective coils and bends.

Whereas perilipin-1 is coded by a single gene, alternative mRNA splicing processes can lead to three protein isoforms (Perilipin A, B and C). Both Perilipin A and B present common N-terminal regions, differing in the C-terminal ones. Concretely, beginning from the N-terminal of Perilipin-1, a PAT domain—characteristic of its protein family—can be found, followed by an also characteristic repeated sequence of 13 residues which form amphipathic helixes with an active role in linking membranes and a 4-helix bundle before the C-terminal carbon. In Perilipin A, lipophile nature is conferred by the slightly hydrophobic amino acids concentrated in the central 25% of the sequence, region that anchors the protein to the core of the lipid droplet.

Perilipin

Identifiers
- Symbol: Perilipin
- Pfam: PF03036
- InterPro: IPR004279
Available protein structures:
- PDB: PDB: 1szi IPR004279 PF03036 (ECOD; PDBsum)
- AlphaFold: IPR004279; PF03036

=== Murine perilipin ===
Serines occupying positions 81, 222, 276, 433, 492 and 517 act as phosphorylation sites -numbered from 1 to 6- for PKA, as well as several other threonines and serines which add up to 27 phosphorylation sites.

== Function ==
Perilipin is a protein that coats lipid droplets (LDs) in adipocytes, the fat-storing cells in adipose tissue. In fact, PLIN1 is greatly expressed in white adipocytes.

It controls adipocyte lipid metabolism. It handles essential functions in the regulation of basal and hormonally stimulated lipolysis and also rises the formation of large LDs which implies an increase in the synthesis of triglycerides.

In humans, Perilipin A is the most abundant protein associated with the adipocyte LDs and lower PLIN1 expression is related with higher rates of lipolysis.

Under basal conditions, Perilipin acts as a protective coating of LDs from the body's natural lipases, such as hormone-sensitive lipase (HSL) and adipose triglyceride lipase (ATGL), which break triglycerides into glycerol and free fatty acids for use in lipid metabolism.

In times of energy deficit, Perilipin is hyperphosphorylated by PKA following β-adrenergic receptor activation. Phosphorylated perilipin changes conformation, exposing the stored lipids to hormone-sensitive lipase-mediated lipolysis.

=== Modulator of adipocyte lipid metabolism ===
Specifically, in the basal state Perilipin A allows a low level of basal lipolysis by reducing the access of cytosolic lipases to stored triacylglycerol in LDs. It is found at their surface in a complex with CGI-58, the co-activator of ATGL. ATGL might also be in this complex but it is quiescent.

Under lipolytically stimulated conditions, PKA is activated and phosphorylates up to 6 Serine residues on Perilipin A (Ser81, 222, 276, 433, 492, and 517) and 2 on HSL (Ser659, and 660). Although PKA also phosphorylates HSL, which can increase its activity, the more than 50-fold increase in fat mobilization (triggered by epinephrine) is primarily due to Perilipin phosphorylation.

Then, Phosphorylated HSL translocates to the LD surface and associates with Perilipin A and Adipocyte fatty acid-binding protein (AFABP). Consequently, HSL gains access to triacylglycerol (TAG) and diacylglycerol (DAG), substrates in LDs. Also, CGI-58 separates from the LD outer layer which leads to a redistribution of ATGL. In particular, ATGL interacts with Perilipin A through phosphorylated Ser517.

As a result, PKA phosphorylation implies an enriched colocation of HLS and ATGL which facilitates maximal lipolysis by the two lipases.

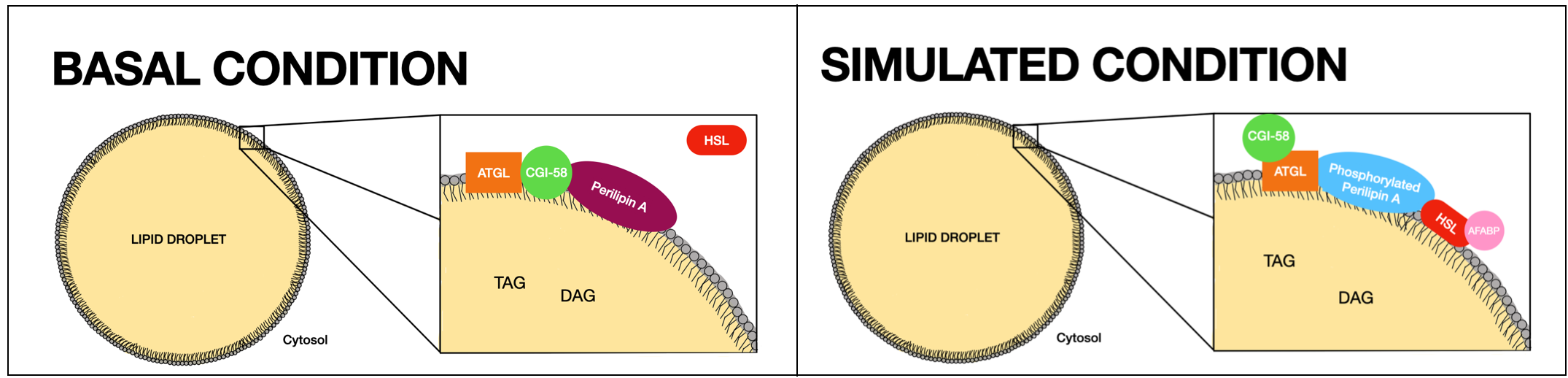
LIPOLYSIS IN LIPID DROPLETS: In basal condition lipolysis of TAG and DAG occurs at low levels thanks to Perilipin A, whereas in simulated condition phosphorylated Perilipin A allows maximal lipolysis of TAG and DAG.

== Clinical significance ==
Perilipin is an important regulator of lipid storage. Both an overexpression or deficiency of the protein, caused by a mutation, lead to severe health issues.

=== Overexpression ===
Perilipin expression is elevated in obese animals and humans. Polymorphisms in the human perilipin (PLIN) gene have been associated with variance in body-weight regulation and may be a genetic influence on obesity risk in humans.

This protein can be modified by O-linked acetylglucosamine (O-GlNac) moieties and the enzyme that intervenes is O-GlcNAc transferase (OGT). An abundance of OGT obstructs lipolysis and benefits diet-induced obesity and whole-body insulin resistance. Studies also propose that an overexpression of adipose O-GlcNAc signaling is a molecular expression of obesity and diabetes in humans.

=== Deficiency ===
Perilipin-null mice eat more food than wild-type mice, but gain 1/3 less fat than wild-type mice on the same diet; perilipin-null mice are thinner, with more lean muscle mass. Perilipin-null mice also exhibit enhanced leptin production and a greater tendency to develop insulin resistance than wild-type mice. Even though perilipin-null mice present less fat mass and a higher insulin resistance, they do not show signs of a whole lipodystrophic phenotype.

In humans, studies suggest that a deficiency of PLIN1 causes lipodystrophic syndromes, which disables the optimal accumulation of triglycerides in adipocytes that derives in an abnormal deposition of lipids in tissues such as skeletal muscle and liver. The storage of lipids in the liver leads to insulin resistance and hypertriglyceridemia. Affected patients are characterized by a subcutaneous fat with smaller than normal adipocytes, macrophage infiltration and fibrosis.

These findings affirm a new primary form of inherited lipodystrophy and emphasize on the severe metabolic consequences of a defect in the formation of lipid droplets in adipose tissue.

In particular, variants 13041A>G and 14995A>T have been associated with increased risk of obesity in women and 11482G>A has been associated with decreased perilipin expression and increased lipolysis in women.
