= Perilipin-3 =

Protein-coding gene in the species Homo sapiens

PLIN3

Identifiers
- Aliases: PLIN3, M6PRBP1, PP17, TIP47, perilipin 3
- External IDs: OMIM: 602702; MGI: 1914155; GeneCards: PLIN3
Available structures
PDB	Ortholog search: PDBe RCSB
PDB	List of PDB id codes 1SZI

Gene location (Human)
Chr.	Chromosome 19 (human)
Band	19p13.3	Start	4,838,341 bp
Band	19p13.3	End	4,867,694 bp

Gene location (Mouse)
Chr.	Chromosome 17 (mouse)
Band	17|17 D	Start	56,584,476 bp
Band	17|17 D	End	56,599,873 bp
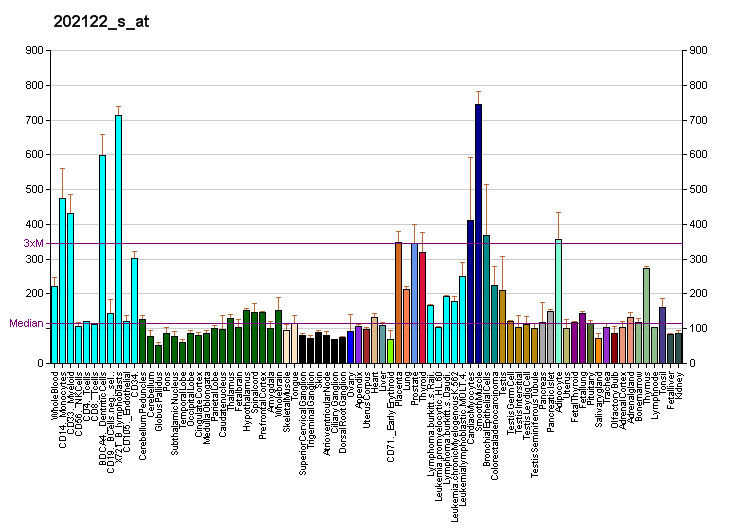
RNA expression pattern
Bgee	Human / Mouse (ortholog); Top expressed in: mucosa of pharynx; body of tongue; inferior ganglion of vagus nerve; superior surface of tongue; nipple; jejunal mucosa; mucosa of esophagus; stromal cell of endometrium; pericardium; epithelium of esophagus / Top expressed in: epithelium of small intestine; intestinal villus; ileum; yolk sac; jejunum; myocardium of ventricle; duodenum; lacrimal gland; utricle; right ventricle; More reference expression data
BioGPS	More reference expression data
Gene ontology
Molecular function	protein binding; cadherin binding
Cellular component	endosome; lipid droplet; Golgi apparatus; endosome membrane; membrane; transport vesicle; cytoplasm; cytosol
Biological process	vesicle-mediated transport; transport
Sources:Amigo / QuickGO
Orthologs
Databases	NCBI: entry; OMA: entry
Species	Human	Mouse
Entrez	10226	66905
Ensembl	ENSG00000105355	ENSMUSG00000024197
UniProt	O60664	Q9DBG5
RefSeq (mRNA)	NM_005817; NM_001164189; NM_001164194	NM_025836
RefSeq (protein)	NP_001157661; NP_001157666; NP_005808	NP_080112
Location (UCSC)	Chr 19: 4.84 – 4.87 Mb	Chr 17: 56.58 – 56.6 Mb
PubMed search
- Wikidata
View/Edit Human	View/Edit Mouse

Mannose-6-phosphate receptor binding protein 1 (M6PRBP1) is a protein which in humans is encoded by the M6PRBP1 gene. Its gene product, as well as the gene itself, is commonly known as TIP47.

== Function ==
Mannose 6-phosphate receptors (MPRs) deliver lysosomal hydrolase from the Golgi to endosomes and then return to the Golgi complex. The protein encoded by this gene interacts with the cytoplasmic domains of both cation-independent and cation-dependent MPRs, and is required for endosome-to-Golgi transport. This protein also binds directly to the GTPase RAB9 (RAB9A), a member of the RAS oncogene family. The interaction with RAB9 has been shown to increase the affinity of this protein for its cargo.

The mannose-6-phosphate receptor-binding properties of TIP47 are disputed, despite the designation of M6PRBP1 as TIP47's gene symbol. TIP47 protein is most commonly described in the scientific literature as a coat protein for lipid droplets.

TIP47 belongs to the peripilin protein family and shares significant homology with the other genes of this family, including perilipin and adipophilin.

== Interactions ==
M6PRBP1 has been shown to interact with both Mannose 6-phosphate receptors.
