= Perilipin-2 =

Protein-coding gene in the species Homo sapiens

PLIN2

Identifiers
- Aliases: PLIN2, ADFP, ADRP, Adipose differentiation-related protein, perilipin 2
- External IDs: OMIM: 103195; MGI: 87920; GeneCards: PLIN2

Gene location (Human)
Chr.	Chromosome 9 (human)
Band	9p22.1	Start	19,108,375 bp
Band	9p22.1	End	19,149,290 bp

Gene location (Mouse)
Chr.	Chromosome 4 (mouse)
Band	4 C4|4 40.69 cM	Start	86,648,386 bp
Band	4 C4|4 40.69 cM	End	86,670,060 bp
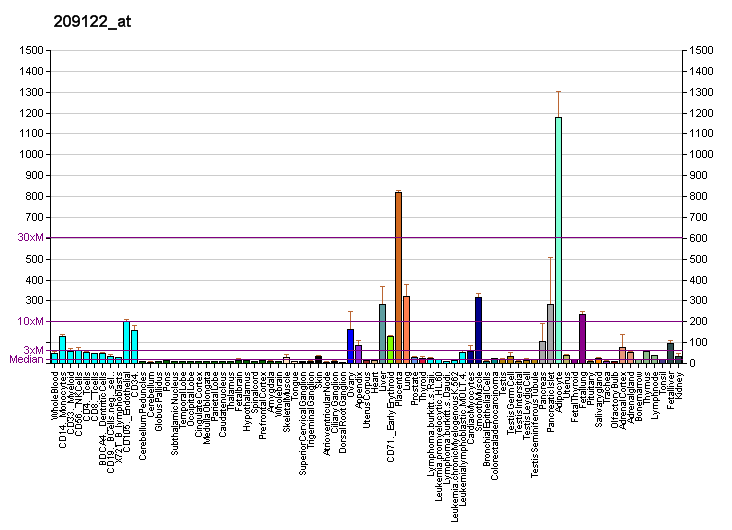
RNA expression pattern
Bgee	Human / Mouse (ortholog); Top expressed in: pericardium; jejunal mucosa; beta cell; gastrocnemius muscle; stromal cell of endometrium; right lobe of liver; duodenum; kidney tubule; subcutaneous adipose tissue; muscle of thigh / Top expressed in: lactiferous gland; left lobe of liver; brown adipose tissue; tunica adventitia of aorta; skin of external ear; white adipose tissue; stroma of bone marrow; fetal liver hematopoietic progenitor cell; subcutaneous adipose tissue; transitional epithelium of urinary bladder; More reference expression data
BioGPS	More reference expression data
Orthologs
Databases	NCBI: entry; OMA: entry
Species	Human	Mouse
Entrez	123	11520
Ensembl	ENSG00000147872	ENSMUSG00000028494
UniProt	Q99541	P43883
RefSeq (mRNA)	NM_001122	NM_007408
RefSeq (protein)	NP_001113	NP_031434; NP_001390640; NP_001390641; NP_001390642; NP_001390643 NP_001390644; NP_001390645; NP_001390646; NP_001390647; NP_001390648; NP_001390649; NP_001390650; NP_001390651
Location (UCSC)	Chr 9: 19.11 – 19.15 Mb	Chr 4: 86.65 – 86.67 Mb
PubMed search
- Wikidata
View/Edit Human	View/Edit Mouse

Perilipin-2, also known as adipose differentiation-related protein (ADRP) or adipophilin, is a protein which belongs to the perilipin (PAT) family of cytoplasmic lipid droplet (CLD)–binding proteins. In humans it is encoded by the PLIN2 gene. This protein surrounds the lipid droplet along with phospholipids and is involved in assisting the storage of neutral lipids within the lipid droplets.

== Discovery ==
The adipose differentiation related protein (ADRP) was first characterized as an mRNA molecule that express early in adipocyte differentiation. The full length cDNA was cloned by rapid amplification of cDNA ends method and sequence analysis results in a protein with 425 amino acids that is unique and similar sequences had not previously been reported.

== Gene location ==
In humans, the gene for adipose differentiation related protein is located at short p arm of chromosome 9 at region 22 band 1 from base pair 19108391 to 19127606 (GRCh38.p7) (map).

== Protein structure ==
The proposed models for adipose differentiation related protein (perilipin 2) is maintained by the protein model portal. It is based on homology modelling and no models were found with greater than 90 percent homology. Perlipin 2 has three different functional domains . 1-115 amino acid sequences at N-terminal is highly similar with other perlipin family proteins and is required for stabilization of lipid droplets, 103-215 mid- region is needed for binding at lipid droplets while the C-terminal sequence from 220-437 forms four helix bundles.

== Function ==
Perilipin 2 was thought to be expressed only in adipose tissues previously. However, later on it was found to be expressed in all types of cells including many non-adipose tissues. The function of perilipin 2 involves the formation of lipid droplets, formation of fatty liver by increasing uptake of fatty acids etc. Decreased expression of perilipin 2 decreases the fatty liver while increase expression of perilipin is associated with several metabolic diseases like type 2 diabetes, insulin resistance, heart diseases. Moreover, its expression was also found to be linked with other age related diseases. This protein is associated with the globule surface membrane material and is major constituent of the globule surface. Increase in mRNA levels is one of the earliest indications of adipocyte differentiation.

Pre-adipocytes are undifferentiated fibroblasts that can be stimulated to form adipocytes. Studies have shed light into potential molecular mechanisms in the fate determination of pre-adipocytes although the exact lineage of adipocyte is still unclear.

== Mutation ==
In humans, a substitution mutation at the C-terminal region of perlipin 2 was shown to affect both the structure and function of the protein. At 251 position, serine residue was substituted by proline which results in the disruption of predicted alpha helical structure of the protein as well as reduction in the plasma triglycerides and lipolysis. Thus, mutation in perlipin 2 may influence the development of different human metabolic diseases.

== In vitro and animal studies ==
=== Metabolic disorders and liver diseases ===
Conditions like obesity, type 2 diabetes are related with metabolic disorders. It involves increase accumulation of lipid due to impaired fatty acid metabolism. Alcoholic liver diseases and non-alcoholic fatty liver disease are two types of conditions associated with liver lipid accumulation. Obesity is related with increase accumulation of lipid droplets in non-adipose tissues causing lipotoxicity. The expression of perlipin 2 at normal level appears necessary to induce obesity in mouse model. Increased activity of perlipin 2 increases the resistance to insulin thereby promoting type 2 diabetes.

=== Cardiovascular diseases ===
Age related diseases like atherosclerosis, hypertension accounts many deaths in elderly people. Accumulation of lipid droplets induce the modification of macrophages to foam cells. Lysis of foam cells resulted in Atherosclerotic plaques and such plaques rupture and blocked the thrombotic vessel. Perlipin 2 protein around the macrophages and foam cells was found to play important role in formation of atheroma. Downregulation of perlipin 2 inhibits the lipid droplet accumulation and decreases the likelihood to convert macrophages to foam cells.

=== Cancer ===
Another factor which increases the risk for cancer is aging process. Analysis of body fluids like urine and blood from circulation from different types of cancer for example colorectal cancer, Burkitt cancer, lung adenocarcinoma showed increase level of Perlipin 2. Perlipin 2 can also serve as a biomarker for early detection of some type of cancer.
