= Congenital generalized lipodystrophy =

Genetic disorder; extreme lack of fat under the skin

- Other names: Berardinelli–Seip syndrome
- An MRI image illustrating the lack of subcutaneous fat of a patient with the disease (G) compared to a control patient (A)
- Specialty: Endocrinology
- Symptoms: Mild specific body features, absence of subcutaneous fat, muscle hypertrophy, insulin resistance, gigantism/acromegaly, large appetite
- Complications: Heart disease, kidney failure, cirrhosis, infertility (women)
- Usual onset: After birth
- Types: CGL type 1, CGL type 2, CGL type 3, CGL type 4

Congenital generalized lipodystrophy (also known as Berardinelli–Seip lipodystrophy) is an extremely rare autosomal recessive condition, characterized by an extreme scarcity of fat in the subcutaneous tissues. It is a type of lipodystrophy disorder where the magnitude of fat loss determines the severity of metabolic complications. Only 250 cases of the condition have been reported, and it is estimated that it occurs in 1 in 10 million people worldwide.

== Presentation ==
Congenital generalized lipodystrophy (CGL) is a rare autosomal recessive disorder which manifests with insulin resistance, absence of subcutaneous fat and muscular hypertrophy. Homozygous or compound heterozygous mutations in four genes are associated with the four subtypes of CGL. The condition appears in early childhood with accelerated linear growth, quick aging of bones, and a large appetite. As the child grows up, acanthosis nigricans (hyperpigmentation and thickening of skin) will begin to present itself throughout the body – mainly in the neck, trunk, and groin. The disorder also has characteristic features like hepatomegaly or an enlarged liver which arises from fatty liver and may lead to cirrhosis, muscle hypertrophy, lack of adipose tissue, splenomegaly, hirsutism (excessive hairiness) and hypertriglyceridemia. Fatty liver and muscle hypertrophy arise from the fact that lipids are instead stored in these areas; whereas in a healthy individual, lipids are distributed more uniformly throughout the body subcutaneously. The absence of adipose tissue where they normally occur causes the body to store fat in the remaining areas. Common cardiovascular problems related to this syndrome are cardiac hypertrophy and arterial hypertension (high blood pressure). This disorder can also cause metabolic syndrome. Most with the disorder also have a prominent umbilicus or umbilical hernia. Commonly, patients will also have acromegaly with enlargement of the hands, feet, and jaw. After puberty, additional symptoms can develop. In women, clitoromegaly and polyendocrine metabolic ovarian syndrome (PMOS) can develop. This impairs fertility for women, and only a few documented cases of successful pregnancies in women with CGL exist. However, the fertility of men with the disorder is unaffected.

=== Differences between type 1 and type 2 ===
There are differences in how type 1 vs type 2 patients are affected by the disease. In type 1 patients, they still have mechanical adipose tissue, but type 2 patients do not have any adipose tissue, including mechanical. In type 2 patients, there is a greater likelihood of psychomotor retardation and intellectual impairment.

== Genetics ==
OMIM	Type	Gene Locus
608594	CGL1	AGPAT2 at 9q34.3
269700	CGL2	BSCL2 at 11q13
612526	CGL3	CAV1 at 7q31.1
613327	CGL4	PTRF at 17q21

== Mechanism ==
=== Type 1 ===
In individuals with Type 1 CGL, the disorder is caused by a mutation at the AGPAT2 gene encoding 1-acylglycerol-3-phosphate O-acyltransferase 2 and located at 9q34.3. This enzyme catalyzes the acylation of lysophosphatidic acid to form phosphatidic acid, which is important in the biosynthesis of fats. This enzyme is highly expressed in adipose tissue, so it can be concluded that when the enzyme is defective in CGL, lipids cannot be stored in the adipose tissue.

=== Type 2 ===
In those who have Type 2 CGL, a mutation in the BSCL2 gene encoding the seipin protein and located at 11q13. This gene encodes a protein, seipin, whose function is unknown. Expression of mRNA for the seipin protein is high in the brain, yet low in adipose tissues. Additionally, patients which have mutations in this protein have a higher incidence of mental retardation and lack mechanically active adipose tissue, which is present in those with AGPAT2 mutations.

=== Type 3 ===
Type 3 CGL involves a mutation in the CAV1 gene. This gene codes for the caveolin protein, which is a scaffolding membrane protein. This protein plays a role in lipid regulation. High levels of Cav1 are normally expressed in adipocytes. Thus, when the CAV1 gene mutates the adipocytes do not have Cav1 and are unable to properly regulate lipid levels.

=== Type 4 ===
A mutation in the PTRF gene causes Type 4 CGL. This gene codes for a protein called polymerase I and transcript release factor. Some of the roles the PTRF product has are to stabilize and aid in formation of caveolae. Thus, the mechanism is similar to Type 3, in that the caveolae are unable to properly form and carry out their role in lipid regulation in both. Types 3 and 4 are two different mutations but they share a common defective pathway.

== Diagnosis ==
Medical diagnosis of CGL can be made after observing the physical symptoms of the disease: lipoatrophy (loss of fat tissues) affecting the trunk, limbs, and face; hepatomegaly; acromegaly; insulin resistance; and high serum levels of triglycerides. Genetic testing can also confirm the disease, as mutations in the AGPAT2 gene is indicative of CGL1, a mutation in the BSCL2 gene is indicative of CGL2, and mutations in the CAV1 and PTRF genes are indicative of CGL3 and CGL4 respectively. Physical diagnosis of CGL is easier, as CGL patients are recognizable from birth, due to their extreme muscular appearance, which is caused by the absence of subcutaneous fat.

CGL3 patients have serum creatine kinase concentrations much higher than normal (2.5 to 10 times the normal limit). This can be used to diagnose type 3 patients and differentiate them from CGL 1 and 2 without mapping their genes. Additionally, CGL3 patients have low muscle tone when compared with other CGL patients.

== Treatment ==
Metformin is the main drug used for treatment, as it is normally used for patients with hyperglycemia. Metformin reduces appetite and improves symptoms of hepatic steatosis and polyendocrine metabolic ovarian syndrome (PMOS). Leptin can also be used to reverse insulin resistance and hepatic steatosis, to cause reduced food intake, and decrease blood glucose levels.

=== Diet ===
CGL patients have to maintain a strict diet for life, as their excess appetite will cause them to overeat. Carbohydrate intake should be restricted in these patients. To avoid chylomicronemia, CGL patients with hypertriglyceridemia need to have a diet very low in fat. CGL patients also need to avoid total proteins, trans fats, and eat high amounts of soluble fiber to avoid getting high levels of cholesterol in the blood.

== History ==
The condition was first described in 1954 by Waldemar Berardinelli in Brazil and independently in 1959 by Martin Fredrik Seip in Norway. The gene for type 1 CGL was identified as AGPAT2 at chromosome 9q34, and later the gene for type 2 CGL was identified as BSCL2 at chromosome 11q13. More recently, type 3 CGL was identified as a separate type of CGL, which was identified as a mutation in the CAV1 gene. Then, a separate type 4 CGL was identified as a mutation in the PTRF gene.

== See also ==
- Lipodystrophy
- Familial partial lipodystrophy
- List of cutaneous conditions
- Skin lesion
- Seipin
