= Phospholipid acyltransferase =

Acyltransferase

Identifiers
- Symbol: Acyltransferase
- Pfam: PF01553
- InterPro: IPR002123
- SCOP2: 1k30 / SCOPe / SUPFAM
- OPM superfamily: 474
- OPM protein: 5xj5
- CDD: cd06551
- Membranome: 741
Available protein structures:
- PDB: IPR002123 PF01553 (ECOD; PDBsum)
- AlphaFold: IPR002123; PF01553

This family contains acyltransferases involved in phospholipid biosynthesis and proteins of unknown function. This family also includes tafazzin, the Barth syndrome gene.

== Subfamilies ==
- 1-acyl-sn-glycerol-3-phosphate acyltransferase InterPro: IPR004552

== Human proteins containing this domain ==
AGPAT1; AGPAT2; AGPAT3; AGPAT4; AGPAT5; AGPAT6; AGPAT7; AYTL1; AYTL2; GNPAT; GPAM; GPAT3; LYCAT; TAZ; TMEM68;
