= Glycerol-3-phosphate O-acyltransferase =

Class of enzymes

glycerol-3-phosphate O-acyltransferase

Identifiers
- EC no.: 2.3.1.15
- CAS no.: 9029-96-3

Databases
- BRENDA: enzyme data
- ExPASy: NiceZyme view
- KEGG: enzyme entry
- MetaCyc: metabolic pathway
- Rhea: reactions
- PDB structures: RCSB PDB PDBe PDBsum
- Gene Ontology: AmiGO / QuickGO
Search
- PMC: articles
- PubMed: articles
- NCBI: proteins

In enzymology, a glycerol-3-phosphate O-acyltransferase (EC 2.3.1.15) is an enzyme that catalyzes the chemical reaction

acyl-CoA + sn-glycerol 3-phosphate $\rightleftharpoons$ CoA + 1-acyl-sn-glycerol 3-phosphate

Thus, the two substrates of this enzyme are acyl-CoA and sn-glycerol 3-phosphate, whereas its two products are CoA and 1-acyl-sn-glycerol 3-phosphate.

This enzyme belongs to the family of transferases, specifically those acyltransferases transferring groups other than aminoacyl groups. The systematic name of this enzyme class is acyl-CoA:sn-glycerol-3-phosphate 1-O-acyltransferase. Other names in common use include alpha-glycerophosphate acyltransferase, 3-glycerophosphate acyltransferase, ACP:sn-glycerol-3-phosphate acyltransferase, glycerol 3-phosphate acyltransferase, glycerol phosphate acyltransferase, glycerol phosphate transacylase, glycerophosphate acyltransferase, glycerophosphate transacylase, sn-glycerol 3-phosphate acyltransferase, and sn-glycerol-3-phosphate acyltransferase. This enzyme participates in glycerolipid metabolism and glycerophospholipid metabolism. The later pathways in human is part of the WikiPathways machine readable pathway collection.

== Structural studies ==
As of late 2007, two structures have been solved for this class of enzymes, with PDB accession codes PDB: 1IUQ and PDB: 1K30. Currently 4 different proteins are assigned to this reaction, GPAM (aka GPAT1), GPAT2, GPAT3 and GPAT4. GPAT1 and 2 are considered mitochondrial proteins.
