= Channelosome =

Proteins associated with an ion channel

The channelosome is the collection of (usually) signalling proteins associated with an ion channel. The channelosome is frequently clustered within a lipid microdomain or caveolae. This collection of proteins may be involved with anchoring, phosphorylation or some other modulatory or support function. An example is neural KCNQ/M (Kv7) potassium channelosome (see Delmas & Brown, 2005).
