= AGPAT3 =

Protein-coding gene in the species Homo sapiens

Identifiers
- Aliases: AGPAT3, LPAAT-GAMMA1, LPAAT3, 1-acylglycerol-3-phosphate O-acyltransferase 3, 1-AGPAT 3
- External IDs: OMIM: 614794; MGI: 1336186; GeneCards: AGPAT3
Enzyme activity
EC #	BRENDA	ExPASy	KEGG	MetaCyc
2.3.1.51	↗	↗	↗	↗

Gene location (Human)
Chr.	Chromosome 21 (human)
Band	21q22.3	Start	43,865,223 bp
Band	21q22.3	End	43,987,592 bp

Gene location (Mouse)
Chr.	Chromosome 10 (mouse)
Band	10 C1|10 39.72 cM	Start	78,105,012 bp
Band	10 C1|10 39.72 cM	End	78,188,323 bp
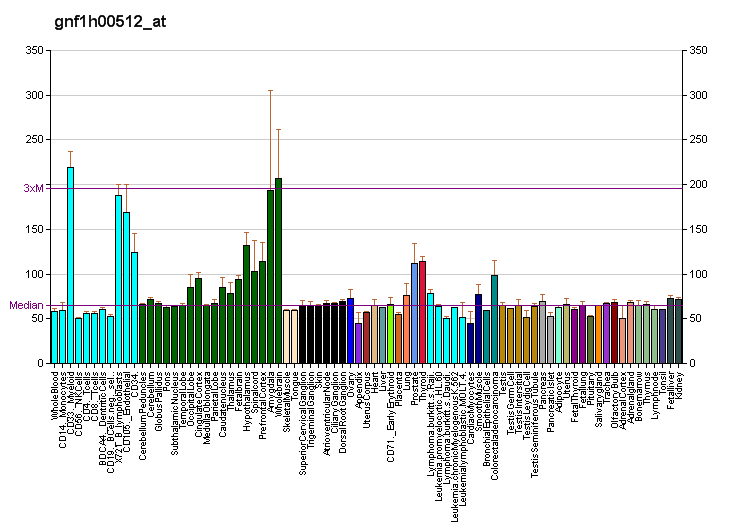

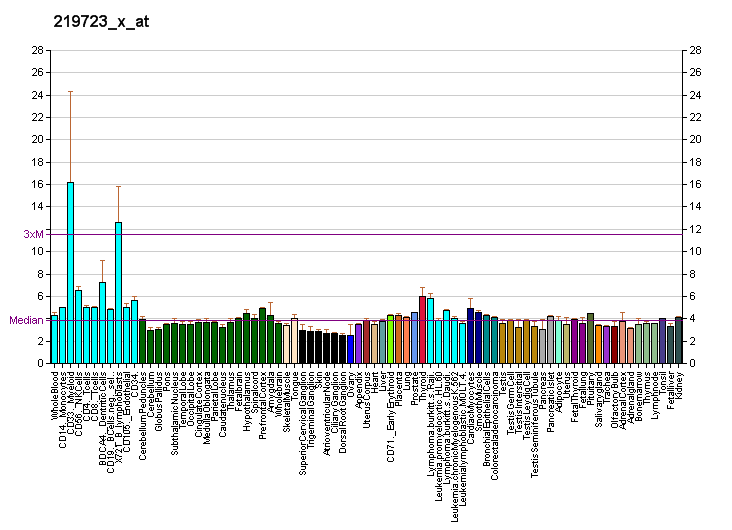

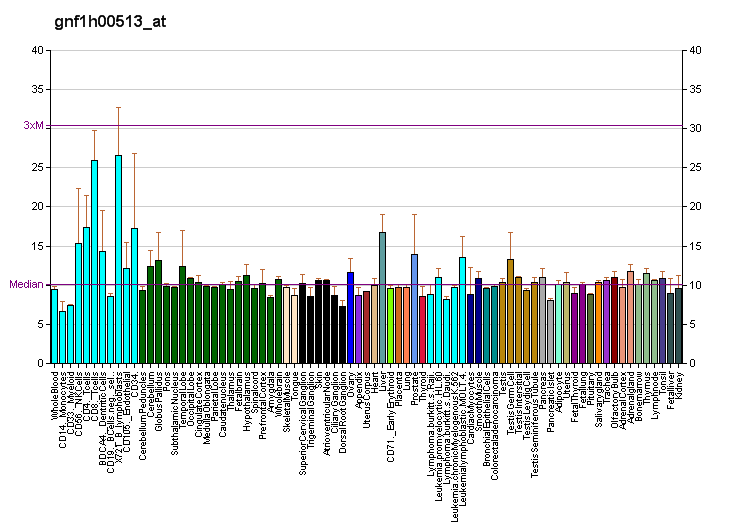
RNA expression pattern
Bgee	Human / Mouse (ortholog); Top expressed in: external globus pallidus; Brodmann area 23; middle temporal gyrus; entorhinal cortex; postcentral gyrus; primary visual cortex; parotid gland; jejunal mucosa; subthalamic nucleus; endothelial cell / Top expressed in: neural layer of retina; saccule; seminiferous tubule; otic placode; right kidney; spermatid; brown adipose tissue; otic vesicle; lip; proximal tubule; More reference expression data
BioGPS	More reference expression data
Gene ontology
Molecular function	transferase activity; acyltransferase activity; lysophosphatidic acid acyltransferase activity; 1-acylglycerol-3-phosphate O-acyltransferase activity
Cellular component	integral component of membrane; plasma membrane; nuclear envelope; endoplasmic reticulum; endoplasmic reticulum membrane; membrane; nucleus; Golgi membrane
Biological process	phosphatidic acid biosynthetic process; CDP-diacylglycerol biosynthetic process; metabolism; phospholipid biosynthetic process; lipid metabolism; phospholipid metabolic process
Sources:Amigo / QuickGO
Orthologs
Databases	NCBI: entry; OMA: entry
Species	Human	Mouse
Entrez	56894	28169
Ensembl	ENSG00000160216	ENSMUSG00000001211
UniProt	Q9NRZ7	Q9D517
RefSeq (mRNA)	NM_001037553; NM_020132; NM_001369878; NM_001369880; NM_001369881	NM_053014
RefSeq (protein)	NP_001032642; NP_064517; NP_001356807; NP_001356809; NP_001356810	NP_443747; NP_001391799; NP_001391800; NP_001391801; NP_001391802 NP_001391803; NP_001391804; NP_001391805; NP_001391806; NP_001391807; NP_001391808; NP_001391809; NP_001391810; NP_001391811
Location (UCSC)	Chr 21: 43.87 – 43.99 Mb	Chr 10: 78.11 – 78.19 Mb
PubMed search
- Wikidata
View/Edit Human	View/Edit Mouse

1-acyl-sn-glycerol-3-phosphate acyltransferase gamma is an enzyme that in humans is encoded by the AGPAT3 gene.

The protein encoded by this gene is an acyltransferase (specifically, 1-acylglycerol-3-phosphate O-acyltransferase) that converts lysophosphatidic acid (1-acyl-sn-glycerol 3-phosphate) into phosphatidic acid, which is the second step in the de novo phospholipid biosynthetic pathway. The encoded protein may be an integral membrane protein. Two transcript variants encoding the same protein have been found for this gene.

== See also ==
- Stereospecific numbering, for sn-
