= Glycerol-3-phosphate 2-O-acyltransferase =

Identifiers
- EC no.: 2.3.1.198

Databases
- IntEnz: IntEnz view
- BRENDA: BRENDA entry
- ExPASy: NiceZyme view
- KEGG: KEGG entry
- MetaCyc: metabolic pathway
- PRIAM: profile
- PDB structures: RCSB PDB PDBe PDBsum
Search
- PMC: articles
- PubMed: articles
- NCBI: proteins

Glycerol-3-phosphate 2-O-acyltransferase (EC 2.3.1.198, sn-2-glycerol-3-phosphate O-acyltransferase, glycerol-3-phosphate O-acyltransferase) is an enzyme with systematic name acyl-CoA:sn-glycerol 3-phosphate 2-O-acyltransferase. This enzyme catalyses the following chemical reaction

acyl-CoA + sn-glycerol 3-phosphate $\rightleftharpoons$ CoA + a 2-acyl-sn-glycerol 3-phosphate

This membrane-associated enzyme is required for suberin or cutin synthesis in plants.
