= Ziritaxestat =

Chemical compound against idiopathic pulmonary fibrosis

Identifiers
- IUPAC name: 2-[[2-ethyl-6-[4-[2-(3-hydroxyazetidin-1-yl)-2-oxoethyl]piperazin-1-yl]-8-methylimidazo[1,2-a]pyridin-3-yl]-methylamino]-4-(4-fluorophenyl)-1,3-thiazole-5-carbonitrile
- CAS Number: 1628260-79-6
- PubChem CID: 90420193
- IUPHAR/BPS: 9561
- DrugBank: DB15403
- ChemSpider: 58828502
- UNII: I02418V13W
- KEGG: D11844
- ChEMBL: ChEMBL3828074

Chemical and physical data
- Formula: C_{30}H_{33}FN_{8}O_{2}S
- Molar mass: 588.71 g·mol^{−1}
- 3D model (JSmol): Interactive image
- SMILES: CCC1=C(N2C=C(C=C(C2=N1)C)N3CCN(CC3)CC(=O)N4CC(C4)O)N(C)C5=NC(=C(S5)C#N)C6=CC=C(C=C6)F
- InChI: InChI=InChI=1S/C30H33FN8O2S/c1-4-24-29(35(3)30-34-27(25(14-32)42-30)20-5-7-21(31)8-6-20)39-15-22(13-19(2)28(39)33-24)37-11-9-36(10-12-37)18-26(41)38-16-23(40)17-38/h5-8,13,15,23,40H,4,9-12,16-18H2,1-3H3; Key:REQQVBGILUTQNN-UHFFFAOYSA-N

Ziritaxestat is a small-molecule, selective autotaxin inhibitor that was investigated as a potential treatment for idiopathic pulmonary fibrosis (IPF). Initially showing promise in early-phase studies, ziritaxestat underwent evaluation in two large-scale phase 3 clinical trials, ISABELA 1 and ISABELA 2. These trials aimed to assess the efficacy and safety of ziritaxestat in patients with IPF, including those receiving standard of care treatment with pirfenidone or nintedanib. However, both trials were prematurely terminated due to a lack of efficacy, as ziritaxestat failed to demonstrate significant improvement in lung function or other clinical outcomes compared to placebo.
