= Somatomedin =

Group of proteins responsible for both promotion and inhibition of cellular growth

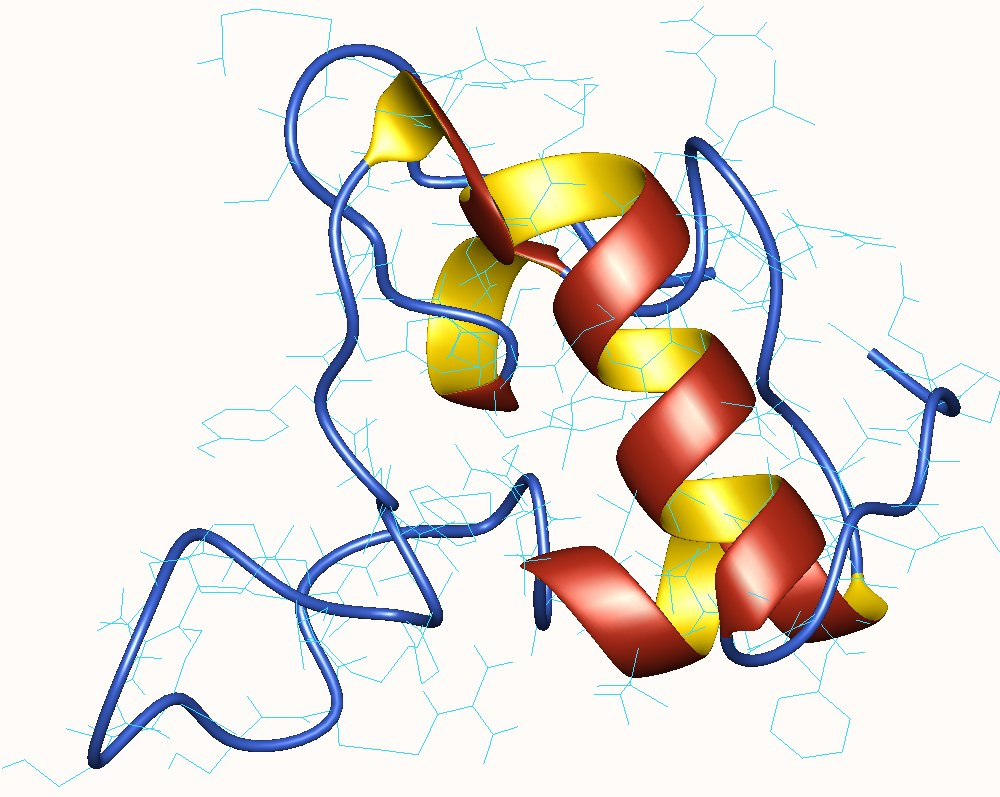
Somatomedin C, Human.

Somatomedins are a group of proteins produced predominantly by the liver when growth hormones act on target tissue. Somatomedins inhibit the release of growth hormones by acting directly on anterior pituitary and by stimulating the secretion of somatostatin from the hypothalamus.

Somatomedins are a group of proteins that promote cell growth and division in response to stimulation by growth hormone (GH), also known as somatotropin (STH).

Somatomedins have similar biological effects to somatotropin.

In addition to their actions that stimulate growth, somatomedins also stimulate production of somatostatin, which suppresses growth hormone release. Thus, levels of somatomedins are controlled via negative feedback through the intermediates of somatostatin and growth hormone. Somatomedins are produced in many tissues and have autocrine and paracrine actions in addition to their endocrine action. The liver is thought to be the predominant source of circulating somatomedins.

Three forms include:

- Somatomedin A, which is another name for insulin-like growth factor 2 (IGF-2)
- Somatomedin B, which is derived from vitronectin
- Somatomedin C, which is another name for insulin-like growth factor 1 (IGF-1)
