= LPAR5 =

Protein-coding gene in the species Homo sapiens

Identifiers
- Aliases: LPAR5, GPR92, GPR93, KPG_010, LPA5, lysophosphatidic acid receptor 5
- External IDs: OMIM: 606926; MGI: 2685918; GeneCards: LPAR5

Gene location (Human)
| Chr. | Chromosome 12 (human) |
| Band | 12p13.31 | Start | 6,618,835 bp |
| Band | 12p13.31 | End | 6,635,960 bp |

Gene location (Mouse)
| Chr. | Chromosome 6 (mouse) |
| Band | 6|6 F2 | Start | 125,044,883 bp |
| Band | 6|6 F2 | End | 125,059,435 bp |
RNA expression pattern
| Bgee | Human / Mouse (ortholog); Top expressed in: gingival epithelium; mucosa of ileum; oral cavity; mucosa of colon; mucosa of sigmoid colon; mucosa of transverse colon; palpebral conjunctiva; jejunal mucosa; amniotic fluid; endothelial cell / Top expressed in: jejunum; colon; esophagus; ileum; duodenum; lip; embryo; embryo; spleen; stomach; More reference expression data |
| BioGPS | n/a |
Gene ontology
| Molecular function | G protein-coupled receptor activity; signal transducer activity; molecular function |
| Cellular component | integral component of membrane; plasma membrane; membrane; cellular component |
| Biological process | signal transduction; G protein-coupled receptor signaling pathway; biological process; positive regulation of CREB transcription factor activity; behavioral response to pain |
Sources:Amigo / QuickGO
Orthologs
| Databases | NCBI: entry; OMA: entry |
| Species | Human | Mouse |
| Entrez | 57121 | 381810 |
| Ensembl | ENSG00000184574 | ENSMUSG00000067714 |
| UniProt | Q9H1C0 | Q149R9 |
| RefSeq (mRNA) | NM_020400; NM_001142961 | NM_001163268; NM_001163269 |
| RefSeq (protein) | NP_001136433; NP_065133 | NP_001156740; NP_001156741 |
| Location (UCSC) | Chr 12: 6.62 – 6.64 Mb | Chr 6: 125.04 – 125.06 Mb |
| PubMed search |
- Wikidata
| View/Edit Human | View/Edit Mouse |

Lysophosphatidic acid receptor 5 also known as LPA_{5} is a protein that in humans is encoded by the LPAR5 gene. LPA_{5} is a G protein-coupled receptor that binds the lipid signaling molecule lysophosphatidic acid (LPA).

== See also ==
- Lysophospholipid receptor
