= Somatomedin B =

Somatomedin B domain

Identifiers
- Symbol: Somatomedin_B
- Pfam: PF01033
- InterPro: IPR001212
- SMART: SO
- PROSITE: PDOC00453
Available protein structures:
- PDB: 2cqwA:25-65 1s4gA:20-63 1ssuA:20-63 1oc0B:20-63 IPR001212 PF01033 (ECOD; PDBsum)
- AlphaFold: IPR001212; PF01033

Somatomedin B is a serum factor of unknown function, is a small cysteine-rich peptide, derived proteolytically from the N-terminus of the cell-substrate adhesion protein vitronectin. Cys-rich somatomedin B-like domains are found in a number of proteins, including plasma-cell membrane glycoprotein (which has nucleotide pyrophosphate and alkaline phosphodiesterase I activities) and placental protein 11 (which appears to possess amidolytic activity).

The SMB domain of vitronectin has been demonstrated to interact with both the urokinase receptor and the plasminogen activator inhibitor-1 (PAI-1) and the conserved cysteines of the NPP1 somatomedin B-like domain have been shown to mediate homodimerization. As shown in the following schematic representation below the SMB domain contains eight Cys residues, arranged into four disulfide bonds. It has been suggested that the active SMB domain may be permitted considerable disulfide bond heterogeneity or variability, provided that the Cys25-Cys31 disulfide bond is preserved. The three-dimensional structure of the SMB domain is extremely compact and the disulfide bonds are packed in the centre of the domain forming a covalently bonded core. The structure of the SMB domain presents a new protein fold, with the only ordered secondary structure being a single-turn alpha-helix and a single-turn 3(10)-helix.

        xxCxxxxxxCxxxxxxxxxCxCxxxCxxxxxCCxxxxxCxxxxx
                           ********************

'C': conserved cysteine probably involved in a disulfide bond. '*': position of the pattern.

== Human proteins containing this domain ==
ENPP1; ENPP2; ENPP3; PRG4; SUSD2; VTN;
