= GPAT4 =

Protein-coding gene in the species Homo sapiens

Identifiers
- Aliases: GPAT4, 1-AGPAT 6, LPAAT-zeta, LPAATZ, TSARG7, AGPAT6, glycerol-3-phosphate acyltransferase 4
- External IDs: OMIM: 608143; MGI: 2142716; GeneCards: GPAT4
Enzyme activity
EC #	BRENDA	ExPASy	KEGG	MetaCyc
2.3.1.15	↗	↗	↗	↗

Gene location (Human)
Chr.	Chromosome 8 (human)
Band	8p11.21	Start	41,577,187 bp
Band	8p11.21	End	41,625,001 bp

Gene location (Mouse)
Chr.	Chromosome 8 (mouse)
Band	8|8 A2	Start	23,661,281 bp
Band	8|8 A2	End	23,698,362 bp
RNA expression pattern
Bgee	Human / Mouse (ortholog); Top expressed in: islet of Langerhans; cerebellar hemisphere; right hemisphere of cerebellum; stromal cell of endometrium; right adrenal cortex; gastrocnemius muscle; left adrenal gland; left adrenal cortex; smooth muscle tissue; appendix / Top expressed in: seminiferous tubule; spermatid; spermatocyte; ventricular zone; neural layer of retina; brown adipose tissue; right kidney; yolk sac; dentate gyrus of hippocampal formation granule cell; muscle of thigh; More reference expression data
BioGPS	n/a
Gene ontology
Molecular function	transferase activity; acyltransferase activity; glycerol-3-phosphate O-acyltransferase activity; 1-acylglycerol-3-phosphate O-acyltransferase activity; sn-1-glycerol-3-phosphate C16:0-DCA-CoA acyl transferase activity
Cellular component	integral component of membrane; endoplasmic reticulum membrane; membrane; endoplasmic reticulum
Biological process	phosphatidic acid biosynthetic process; CDP-diacylglycerol biosynthetic process; lipid biosynthetic process; acyl-CoA metabolic process; regulation of multicellular organism growth; lipid metabolism; fatty acid metabolic process; mammary gland development; diacylglycerol metabolic process; phospholipid biosynthetic process; glandular epithelial cell maturation; phosphatidylcholine biosynthetic process; metabolism; lactation; triglyceride metabolic process; triglyceride biosynthetic process
Sources:Amigo / QuickGO
Orthologs
Databases	NCBI: entry; OMA: entry
Species	Human	Mouse
Entrez	137964	102247
Ensembl	ENSG00000158669	ENSMUSG00000031545
UniProt	Q86UL3	Q8K2C8
RefSeq (mRNA)	NM_178819; NM_001363197; NM_001363198	NM_018743
RefSeq (protein)	NP_848934; NP_001350126; NP_001350127	NP_061213
Location (UCSC)	Chr 8: 41.58 – 41.63 Mb	Chr 8: 23.66 – 23.7 Mb
PubMed search
- Wikidata
View/Edit Human	View/Edit Mouse

Glycerol-3-phosphate acyltransferase 4 is a glycerol-3-phosphate acyltransferase that in humans is encoded by the GPAT4 gene.

== Function ==
GPAT4 is involved in the biosynthesis of triglycerides. The majority of triglycerides are synthesised from glycerol 3-phosphate (G3P) via the addition of three fatty acyl-CoA substrates, which are made from fatty acids. The first of these additions is catalysed by glycerol-3-phosphate acyltransferases (GPATs: EC 2.3.1.15), including GPAT4, yielding lysophosphatidic acid. GPAT4 has been shown to be important for lactation, with quantitative trait locus (QTL) for several milk production and composition traits observed at this locus in cattle.
