= Gene regulatory network =

Collection of molecular regulators

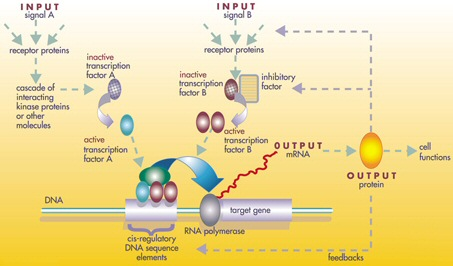
Structure of a gene regulatory network

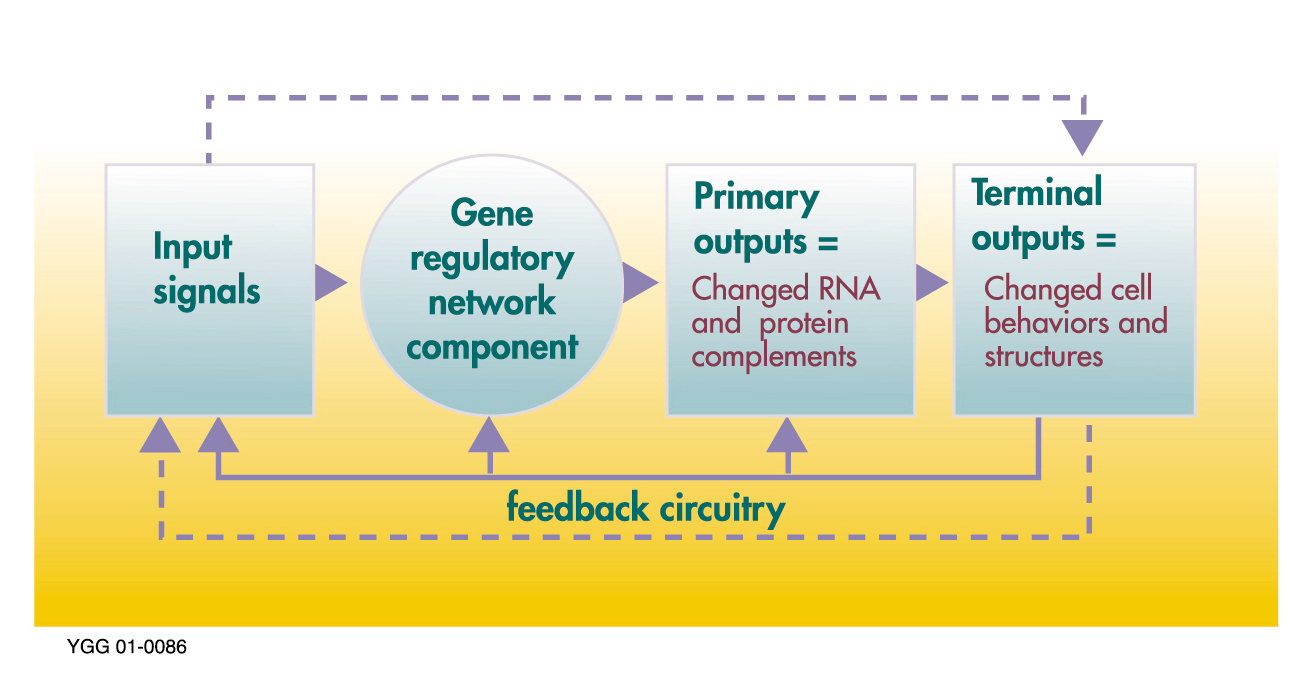
Control process of a gene regulatory network

A gene (or genetic) regulatory network (GRN) is a collection of molecular regulators that interact with each other and with other substances in the cell to govern the gene expression levels of mRNA and proteins which, in turn, determine the function of the cell. GRNs also play a central role in morphogenesis, the creation of body structures, which is central to evolutionary developmental biology (evo-devo).

The regulator can be DNA, RNA, protein or any combination of two or more of these three that form a complex, such as a specific sequence of DNA and a transcription factor to activate that sequence. The interaction can be direct or indirect (through transcribed RNA or translated protein). In general, each mRNA molecule goes on to make a specific protein (or set of proteins). In some cases this protein will be structural, and will accumulate at the cell membrane or within the cell to give it particular structural properties. In other cases the protein will be an enzyme, i.e., a micro-machine that catalyses a certain reaction, such as the breakdown of a food source or toxin. Some proteins serve only to activate other genes, though, and these are the transcription factors that are the main actors in regulatory networks or cascades. By binding to the promoter region at the start of other genes they turn them on, initiating the production of another protein, and so on. Some transcription factors are inhibitory.

In single-celled organisms, regulatory networks respond to the external environment, optimising the cell at a given time for survival in this environment. Thus a yeast cell in a sugar solution will turn on genes to make enzymes that process the sugar to alcohol. This process, which we associate with wine-making, is how the yeast cell makes its living, gaining energy to multiply, which under normal circumstances would enhance its survival prospects.

In multicellular animals the same principle has been put in the service of gene cascades that control body-shape. Each time a cell divides, two cells result which, although they contain the same genome in full, can differ in which genes are turned on and making proteins. Sometimes a 'self-sustaining feedback loop' ensures that a cell maintains its identity and passes it on. Less understood is the mechanism of epigenetics by which chromatin modification may provide cellular memory by blocking or allowing transcription. A major feature of multicellular animals is the use of morphogen gradients, which in effect provide a positioning system that tells a cell where in the body it is, and hence what sort of cell to become. A gene that is turned on in one cell may make a product that leaves the cell and diffuses through adjacent cells, entering them and turning on genes only when it is present above a certain threshold level. These cells are thus induced into a new fate, and may even generate other morphogens that signal back to the original cell. Over longer distances morphogens may use the active process of signal transduction. Such signalling controls embryogenesis, the building of a body plan from scratch through a series of sequential steps. They also control and maintain adult bodies through feedback processes, and the loss of such feedback because of a mutation can be responsible for the cell proliferation that is seen in cancer. In parallel with this process of building structure, the gene cascade turns on genes that make structural proteins that give each cell the physical properties it needs.

== Overview ==
At one level, biological cells can be thought of as "partially mixed bags" of biological chemicals – in the discussion of gene regulatory networks, these chemicals are mostly the messenger RNAs (mRNAs) and proteins that arise from gene expression. These mRNA and proteins interact with each other with various degrees of specificity. Some diffuse around the cell. Others are bound to cell membranes, interacting with molecules in the environment. Still others pass through cell membranes and mediate long range signals to other cells in a multi-cellular organism. These molecules and their interactions comprise a gene regulatory network.

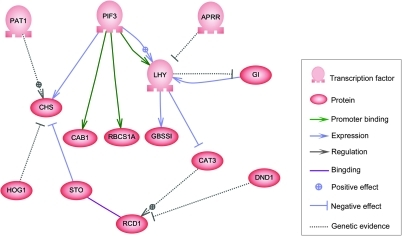
Example of a regulatory network

The nodes of this network can represent genes, proteins, mRNAs, protein/protein complexes or cellular processes. Nodes that are depicted as lying along vertical lines are associated with the cell/environment interfaces, while the others are free-floating and can diffuse. Edges between nodes represent interactions between the nodes, that can correspond to individual molecular reactions between DNA, mRNA, miRNA, proteins or molecular processes through which the products of one gene affect those of another, though the lack of experimentally obtained information often implies that some reactions are not modeled at such a fine level of detail. These interactions can be inductive (usually represented by arrowheads or the + sign), with an increase in the concentration of one leading to an increase in the other, inhibitory (represented with filled circles, blunt arrows or the minus sign), with an increase in one leading to a decrease in the other, or dual, when depending on the circumstances the regulator can activate or inhibit the target node. The nodes can regulate themselves directly or indirectly, creating feedback loops, which form cyclic chains of dependencies in the topological network. The network structure is an abstraction of the system's molecular or chemical dynamics, describing the manifold ways in which one substance affects all the others to which it is connected. In practice, such GRNs are inferred from the biological literature on a given system and represent a distillation of the collective knowledge about a set of related biochemical reactions. To speed up the manual curation of GRNs, some recent efforts try to use text mining, curated databases, network inference from massive data, model checking and other information extraction technologies for this purpose.

Genes can be viewed as nodes in the network, with input being proteins such as transcription factors, and outputs being the level of gene expression. The value of the node depends on a function which depends on the value of its regulators in previous time steps (in the Boolean network described below these are Boolean functions, typically AND, OR, and NOT). These functions have been interpreted as performing a kind of information processing within the cell, which determines cellular behavior. The basic drivers within cells are concentrations of some proteins, which determine both spatial (location within the cell or tissue) and temporal (cell cycle or developmental stage) coordinates of the cell, as a kind of "cellular memory". The gene networks are only beginning to be understood, and it is a next step for biology to attempt to deduce the functions for each gene "node", to help understand the behavior of the system in increasing levels of complexity, from gene to signaling pathway, cell or tissue level.

Mathematical models of GRNs have been developed to capture the behavior of the system being modeled, and in some cases generate predictions corresponding with experimental observations. In some other cases, models have proven to make accurate novel predictions, which can be tested experimentally, thus suggesting new approaches to explore in an experiment that sometimes wouldn't be considered in the design of the protocol of an experimental laboratory. Modeling techniques include differential equations (ODEs), Boolean networks, Petri nets, Bayesian networks, graphical Gaussian network models, Stochastic, and Process Calculi. Conversely, techniques have been proposed for generating models of GRNs that best explain a set of time series observations. Recently it has been shown that ChIP-seq signal of histone modification are more correlated with transcription factor motifs at promoters in comparison to RNA level. Hence it is proposed that time-series histone modification ChIP-seq could provide more reliable inference of gene-regulatory networks in comparison to methods based on expression levels.

== Structure ==
=== Global feature ===
Gene regulatory networks are generally thought to be made up of a few highly connected nodes (hubs) and many poorly connected nodes nested within a hierarchical regulatory regime. Thus gene regulatory networks approximate a hierarchical scale free network topology. This is consistent with the view that most genes have limited pleiotropy and operate within regulatory modules. This structure is thought to evolve due to the preferential attachment of duplicated genes to more highly connected genes. Recent work has also shown that natural selection tends to favor networks with sparse connectivity.

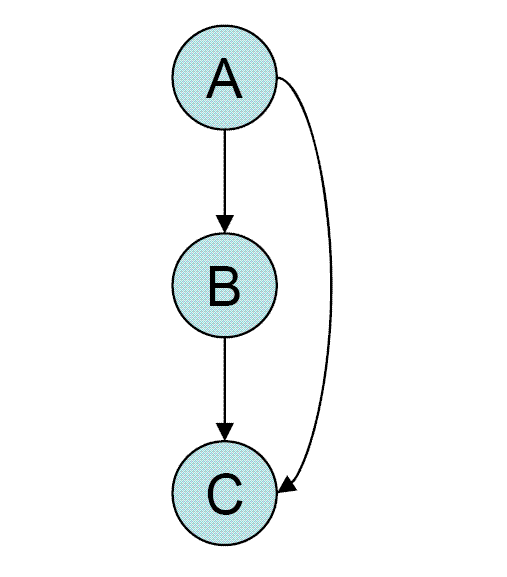
Feed-forward loop

=== Local feature ===
Another characteristic of gene regulatory network is their abundance of certain repetitive sub-networks known as network motifs. Network motifs can be regarded as repetitive topological patterns when dividing a big network into small blocks. Several types of motifs appear more often in gene regulatory networks than in randomly generated networks. As an example, one such motif is called feed-forward loops, which consist of three nodes. This motif is the most abundant among all possible motifs made up of three nodes, as is shown in the gene regulatory networks of fly, nematode, and human.

== Evolution ==
There are primarily two ways that networks can evolve, both of which can occur simultaneously. The first is that network topology can be changed by the addition or subtraction of nodes (genes, regulatory sequences). For example, the Hippo signaling pathway controls both mitotic growth and post-mitotic cellular differentiation in Drosophila and vertebrates. In mice, the Fat4 cadherin, the ortholog of the Hippo pathway regulator Fat in Drosophila, does not appear to regulate the Hippo pathway in the murine liver. Fat and the adaptor protein Expanded gained novel domains that connect them to the Hippo pathway, whereas the cell-adhesion receptor Echinoid evolved as a new protein. In addition, the junction adaptor Angiomotin (Amot) was lost and the downstream effector Yap lost its PDZ-binding motif that interacts with cell junction proteins.

The second way networks can evolve is by changing the strength of interactions between nodes, such as how strongly a transcription factor may bind to a cis-regulatory element. Such variation in strength of network edges has been shown to underlie the variation of vulva cell fate patterning across species in Caenorhabditis worms.

=== Convergent evolution: theoretical considerations ===
For example, modeling shows that feed-forward loops are able to coordinate the change in node A (in terms of concentration and activity) and the expression dynamics of node C, creating different input-output behaviors. The galactose utilization system of E. coli contains a feed-forward loop which accelerates the activation of galactose utilization operon galETK, potentially facilitating the metabolic transition to galactose when glucose is depleted. The feed-forward loop in the arabinose utilization systems of E.coli delays the activation of arabinose catabolism operon and transporters, potentially avoiding unnecessary metabolic transition due to temporary fluctuations in upstream signaling pathways.

Similarly in the Wnt signaling pathway of Xenopus, the feed-forward loop acts as a fold-change detector that responses to the fold change, rather than the absolute change, in the level of β-catenin, potentially increasing the resistance to fluctuations in β-catenin levels. Following the convergent evolution hypothesis, the enrichment of feed-forward loops would be an adaptation for fast response and noise resistance. A recent research found that yeast grown in an environment of constant glucose developed mutations in glucose signaling pathways and growth regulation pathway, suggesting regulatory components responding to environmental changes are dispensable under constant environment.

On the other hand, some researchers hypothesize that the enrichment of network motifs is non-adaptive. In other words, gene regulatory networks can evolve to a similar structure without the specific selection on the proposed input-output behavior. Support for this hypothesis often comes from computational simulations. For example, fluctuations in the abundance of feed-forward loops in a model that simulates the evolution of gene regulatory networks by randomly rewiring nodes may suggest that the enrichment of feed-forward loops is a side-effect of evolution. In another model of gene regulator networks evolution, the ratio of the frequencies of gene duplication and gene deletion show great influence on network topology: certain ratios lead to the enrichment of feed-forward loops and create networks that show features of hierarchical scale free networks. De novo evolution of coherent type 1 feed-forward loops has been demonstrated computationally in response to selection for their hypothesized function of filtering out a short spurious signal, supporting adaptive evolution, but for non-idealized noise, a dynamics-based system of feed-forward regulation with different topology was instead favored.

A heuristic approach to developing GRNs has the potential to improve understanding of gene regulation by modelling GRNs as small-world networks, in which genes are densely interconnected through a small number of intermediate regulatory steps, enabling rapid signal propagation across the network. This reveals that GRNs exhibit scale-free topology, characterised by a small number of highly connected hub genes that exert disproportionate regulatory influence over the broader network. This topological perspective is particularly relevant to the debate over whether network motif enrichment is adaptive or non-adaptive — computational simulations suggest that the enrichment of feed-forward loops may emerge as a side effect of evolution through random rewiring, while gene duplication and deletion ratios further shape network topology toward hierarchical, scale-free structures. By integrating these topological properties with gene expression data, heuristics-driven GRN inference bridges the gap between computational network models and the underlying biological reality of transcriptional regulation, with direct implications for understanding disease mechanisms and identifying candidate therapeutic targets.

=== Origin of new promoters ===
Single‐nucleotide mutations can generate new promoters. For instance, in Escherichia coli a new promoter was created by a mutation within the coding sequence of a gene upstream of madA that created a novel promoter driving the expression of madA.

== Bacterial regulatory networks ==
Regulatory networks allow bacteria to adapt to almost every environmental niche on earth. A network of interactions among diverse types of molecules including DNA, RNA, proteins and metabolites, is utilised by the bacteria to achieve regulation of gene expression. In bacteria, the principal function of regulatory networks is to control the response to environmental changes, for example nutritional status and environmental stress. A complex organization of networks permits the microorganism to coordinate and integrate multiple environmental signals.

One example stress is when the environment suddenly becomes poor of nutrients. This triggers a complex adaptation process in bacteria, such as E. coli. After this environmental change, thousands of genes change expression level. However, these changes are predictable from the topology and logic of the gene network that is reported in RegulonDB. Specifically, on average, the response strength of a gene was predictable from the difference between the numbers of activating and repressing input transcription factors of that gene.

== Modelling ==
=== Coupled ordinary differential equations ===
It is common to model such a network with a set of coupled ordinary differential equations (ODEs) or SDEs, describing the reaction kinetics of the constituent parts. Suppose that our regulatory network has $N$ nodes, and let $S_1(t),S_2(t), \ldots, S_N(t)$ represent the concentrations of the $N$ corresponding substances at time $t$. Then the temporal evolution of the system can be described approximately by

$$\frac{dS_j}{dt} = f_j \left (S_1,S_2, \ldots, S_N \right)$$

where the functions $f_j$ express the dependence of $S_j$ on the concentrations of other substances present in the cell. The functions $f_j$ are ultimately derived from basic principles of chemical kinetics or simple expressions derived from these e.g. Michaelis–Menten enzymatic kinetics. Hence, the functional forms of the $f_j$ are usually chosen as low-order polynomials or Hill functions that serve as an ansatz for the real molecular dynamics. Such models are then studied using the mathematics of nonlinear dynamics. System-specific information, like reaction rate constants and sensitivities, are encoded as constant parameters.

By solving for the fixed point of the system:

$$\frac{dS_j}{dt} = 0$$

for all $j$, one obtains (possibly several) concentration profiles of proteins and mRNAs that are theoretically sustainable (though not necessarily stable). Steady states of kinetic equations thus correspond to potential cell types, and oscillatory solutions to the above equation to naturally cyclic cell types. Mathematical stability of these attractors can usually be characterized by the sign of higher derivatives at critical points, and then correspond to biochemical stability of the concentration profile. Critical points and bifurcations in the equations correspond to critical cell states in which small state or parameter perturbations could switch the system between one of several stable differentiation fates. Trajectories correspond to the unfolding of biological pathways and transients of the equations to short-term biological events. For a more mathematical discussion, see the articles on nonlinearity, dynamical systems, bifurcation theory, and chaos theory.

=== Boolean network ===
The following example illustrates how a Boolean network can model a GRN together with its gene products (the outputs) and the substances from the environment that affect it (the inputs). Stuart Kauffman was amongst the first biologists to use the metaphor of Boolean networks to model genetic regulatory networks.

1. Each gene, each input, and each output is represented by a node in a directed graph in which there is an arrow from one node to another if and only if there is a causal link between the two nodes.
2. Each node in the graph can be in one of two states: on or off.
3. For a gene, "on" corresponds to the gene being expressed; for inputs and outputs, "on" corresponds to the substance being present.
4. Time is viewed as proceeding in discrete steps. At each step, the new state of a node is a Boolean function of the prior states of the nodes with arrows pointing towards it.

The validity of the model can be tested by comparing simulation results with time series observations. A partial validation of a Boolean network model can also come from testing the predicted existence of a yet unknown regulatory connection between two particular transcription factors that each are nodes of the model.

=== Continuous networks ===
Continuous network models of GRNs are an extension of the Boolean networks described above. Nodes still represent genes and connections between them regulatory influences on gene expression. Genes in biological systems display a continuous range of activity levels and it has been argued that using a continuous representation captures several properties of gene regulatory networks not present in the Boolean model. Formally most of these approaches are similar to an artificial neural network, as inputs to a node are summed up and the result serves as input to a sigmoid function, e.g., but proteins do often control gene expression in a synergistic, i.e. non-linear, way. However, there is now a continuous network model that allows grouping of inputs to a node thus realizing another level of regulation. This model is formally closer to a higher order recurrent neural network. The same model has also been used to mimic the evolution of cellular differentiation and even multicellular morphogenesis.

=== Stochastic gene networks ===
Experimental results have demonstrated that gene expression is a stochastic process. Thus, many authors are now using the stochastic formalism, after the work by Arkin et al. Works on single gene expression and small synthetic genetic networks, such as the genetic toggle switch of Tim Gardner and Jim Collins, provided additional experimental data on the phenotypic variability and the stochastic nature of gene expression. The first versions of stochastic models of gene expression involved only instantaneous reactions and were driven by the Gillespie algorithm.

Since some processes, such as gene transcription, involve many reactions and could not be correctly modeled as an instantaneous reaction in a single step, it was proposed to model these reactions as single step multiple delayed reactions in order to account for the time it takes for the entire process to be complete.

From here, a set of reactions was proposed that allow generating GRNs. These are then simulated using a modified version of the Gillespie algorithm, that can simulate multiple time delayed reactions (chemical reactions where each of the products is provided a time delay that determines when will it be released in the system as a "finished product").

For example, basic transcription of a gene can be represented by the following single-step reaction (RNAP is the RNA polymerase, RBS is the RNA ribosome binding site, and Pro_{i} is the promoter region of gene i):

$$\text{RNAP} + \text{Pro}_i \overset{k_{i,bas}}
\longrightarrow \text{Pro}_i(\tau _i^1 ) + \text{RBS}_i(\tau_i^1)+ \text{RNAP}(\tau _i^2)$$

Furthermore, there seems to be a trade-off between the noise in gene expression, the speed with which genes can switch, and the metabolic cost associated their functioning. More specifically, for any given level of metabolic cost, there is an optimal trade-off between noise and processing speed and increasing the metabolic cost leads to better speed-noise trade-offs.

A recent work proposed a simulator (SGNSim, Stochastic Gene Networks Simulator), that can model GRNs where transcription and translation are modeled as multiple time delayed events and its dynamics is driven by a stochastic simulation algorithm (SSA) able to deal with multiple time delayed events. The time delays can be drawn from several distributions and the reaction rates from complex functions or from physical parameters. SGNSim can generate ensembles of GRNs within a set of user-defined parameters, such as topology. It can also be used to model specific GRNs and systems of chemical reactions. Genetic perturbations such as gene deletions, gene over-expression, insertions, frame shift mutations can also be modeled as well.

The GRN is created from a graph with the desired topology, imposing in-degree and out-degree distributions. Gene promoter activities are affected by other genes expression products that act as inputs, in the form of monomers or combined into multimers and set as direct or indirect. Next, each direct input is assigned to an operator site and different transcription factors can be allowed, or not, to compete for the same operator site, while indirect inputs are given a target. Finally, a function is assigned to each gene, defining the gene's response to a combination of transcription factors (promoter state). The transfer functions (that is, how genes respond to a combination of inputs) can be assigned to each combination of promoter states as desired.

In other recent work, multiscale models of gene regulatory networks have been developed that focus on synthetic biology applications. Simulations have been used that model all biomolecular interactions in transcription, translation, regulation, and induction of gene regulatory networks, guiding the design of synthetic systems.

== Prediction ==
Other work has focused on predicting the gene expression levels in a gene regulatory network. The approaches used to model gene regulatory networks have been constrained to be interpretable and, as a result, are generally simplified versions of the network. For example, Boolean networks have been used due to their simplicity and ability to handle noisy data but lose data information by having a binary representation of the genes. Also, artificial neural networks omit using a hidden layer so that they can be interpreted, losing the ability to model higher order correlations in the data. Using a model that is not constrained to be interpretable, a more accurate model can be produced. Being able to predict gene expressions more accurately provides a way to explore how drugs affect a system of genes as well as for finding which genes are interrelated in a process. This has been encouraged by the DREAM competition which promotes a competition for the best prediction algorithms. Some other recent work has used artificial neural networks with a hidden layer.

== Applications ==
=== Multiple sclerosis ===
There are three classes of multiple sclerosis: relapsing-remitting (RRMS), primary progressive (PPMS) and secondary progressive (SPMS). Gene regulatory network (GRN) plays a vital role to understand the disease mechanism across these three different multiple sclerosis classes.

== See also ==
- Body plan
- Cis-regulatory module
- Genenetwork (database)
- Morphogen
- Operon
- Synexpression
- Systems biology
- Weighted gene co-expression network analysis
