= ZNF148 =

Gene of the species Homo sapiens

Identifiers
- Aliases: ZNF148, BERF-1, BFCOL1, HT-BETA, ZBP-89, ZFP148, pHZ-52, zinc finger protein 148
- External IDs: OMIM: 601897; MGI: 1332234; GeneCards: ZNF148

Gene location (Mouse)
| Chr. | Chromosome 16 (mouse) |
| Band | 16 B3|16 23.93 cM | Start | 33,201,206 bp |
| Band | 16 B3|16 23.93 cM | End | 33,324,733 bp |
Gene ontology
| Molecular function | sequence-specific DNA binding; DNA binding; DNA-binding transcription factor activity; metal ion binding; transcription cis-regulatory region binding; RNA polymerase II cis-regulatory region sequence-specific DNA binding; DNA-binding transcription repressor activity, RNA polymerase II-specific; protein binding; nucleic acid binding; double-stranded DNA binding; DNA-binding transcription factor activity, RNA polymerase II-specific |
| Cellular component | Golgi apparatus; nucleus; nucleoplasm |
| Biological process | regulation of transcription, DNA-templated; substantia nigra development; negative regulation of transcription by RNA polymerase II; transcription by RNA polymerase II; negative regulation of gene expression; transcription, DNA-templated; cellular defense response; gamete generation; negative regulation of transcription, DNA-templated; positive regulation of transcription by RNA polymerase II; protein-containing complex assembly |
Sources:Amigo / QuickGO
Orthologs
| Databases | NCBI: entry; OMA: entry |
| Species | Human | Mouse |
| Entrez | 7707 | 22661 |
| Ensembl | ENSG00000163848 | ENSMUSG00000022811 |
| UniProt | Q9UQR1 | Q61624 |
| RefSeq (mRNA) | NM_021964 | NM_011749; NM_001358569; NM_001358570 |
| RefSeq (protein) | NP_068799; NP_001335354; NP_001335355; NP_001335356; NP_001335357 NP_001335358; NP_001335359; NP_001335360; NP_001335361; NP_001335362; NP_001335363; NP_001335365; NP_001335353 | NP_035879; NP_001345498; NP_001345499 |
| Location (UCSC) | n/a | Chr 16: 33.2 – 33.32 Mb |
| PubMed search |
- Wikidata
| View/Edit Human | View/Edit Mouse |

Zinc finger protein 148 is a protein that in humans is encoded by the ZNF148 gene.

== Interactions ==
ZNF148 has been shown to interact with PTRF and P53.

== See also ==
- Zinc finger
