= AGPAT5 =

Protein-coding gene in the species Homo sapiens

Identifiers
- Aliases: AGPAT5, 1LPAATE, 1-acylglycerol-3-phosphate O-acyltransferase 5
- External IDs: OMIM: 614796; MGI: 1196345; GeneCards: AGPAT5
Enzyme activity
EC #	BRENDA	ExPASy	KEGG	MetaCyc
2.3.1.51	↗	↗	↗	↗

Gene location (Human)
Chr.	Chromosome 8 (human)
Band	8p23.1	Start	6,708,642 bp
Band	8p23.1	End	6,761,503 bp

Gene location (Mouse)
Chr.	Chromosome 8 (mouse)
Band	8 A1.3|8 10.3 cM	Start	18,896,293 bp
Band	8 A1.3|8 10.3 cM	End	18,941,377 bp
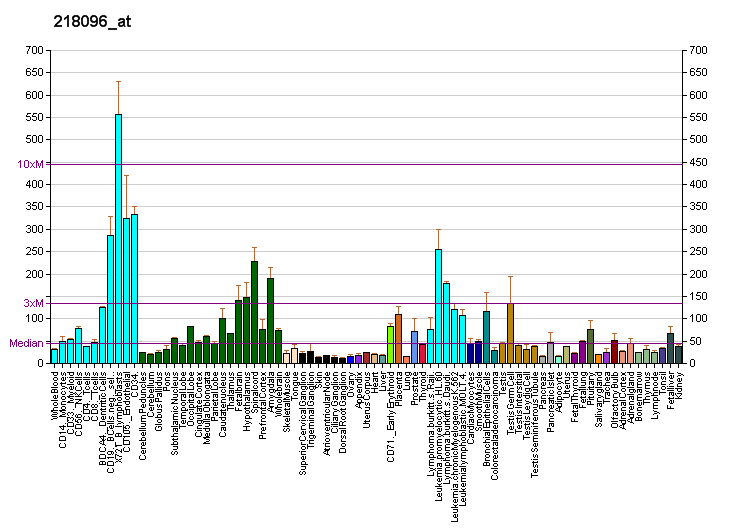
RNA expression pattern
Bgee	Human / Mouse (ortholog); Top expressed in: corpus callosum; ventricular zone; ganglionic eminence; left testis; right testis; endometrium; C1 segment; Achilles tendon; caudate nucleus; islet of Langerhans / Top expressed in: triceps brachii muscle; sternocleidomastoid muscle; temporal muscle; digastric muscle; skin of external ear; seminal vesicula; endothelial cell of lymphatic vessel; pineal gland; umbilical cord; decidua; More reference expression data
BioGPS	More reference expression data
Gene ontology
Molecular function	transferase activity; protein binding; acyltransferase activity; 1-acylglycerol-3-phosphate O-acyltransferase activity
Cellular component	integral component of membrane; nuclear envelope; membrane; endoplasmic reticulum membrane; mitochondrial outer membrane; mitochondrion; endoplasmic reticulum; nucleus
Biological process	phosphatidic acid biosynthetic process; CDP-diacylglycerol biosynthetic process; lipid metabolism; hematopoietic progenitor cell differentiation; phospholipid biosynthetic process; metabolism; acylglycerol metabolic process; phospholipid metabolic process
Sources:Amigo / QuickGO
Orthologs
Databases	NCBI: entry; OMA: entry
Species	Human	Mouse
Entrez	55326	52123
Ensembl	ENSG00000155189; ENSG00000284980	ENSMUSG00000031467
UniProt	Q9NUQ2	Q9D1E8
RefSeq (mRNA)	NM_018361	NM_026792
RefSeq (protein)	NP_060831	NP_081068
Location (UCSC)	Chr 8: 6.71 – 6.76 Mb	Chr 8: 18.9 – 18.94 Mb
PubMed search
- Wikidata
View/Edit Human	View/Edit Mouse

1-acyl-sn-glycerol-3-phosphate acyltransferase epsilon is an enzyme that is encoded by the AGPAT5 gene in humans.

This gene encodes a member of the 1-acylglycerol-3-phosphate O-acyltransferase family. This integral membrane protein converts lysophosphatidic acid to phosphatidic acid, the second step in de novo phospholipid biosynthesis.
