= Caveolae-associated protein 1 =

Protein found in humans

CAVIN1

Identifiers
- Aliases: CAVIN1, CAVIN, CGL4, cavin-1, FKSG13, PTRF, polymerase I and transcript release factor, caveolae associated protein 1
- External IDs: OMIM: 603198; MGI: 1277968; GeneCards: CAVIN1

Gene location (Human)
Chr.	Chromosome 17 (human)
Band	17q21.2	Start	42,402,449 bp
Band	17q21.2	End	42,423,256 bp

Gene location (Mouse)
Chr.	Chromosome 11 (mouse)
Band	11 D|11 63.95 cM	Start	100,847,559 bp
Band	11 D|11 63.95 cM	End	100,861,713 bp
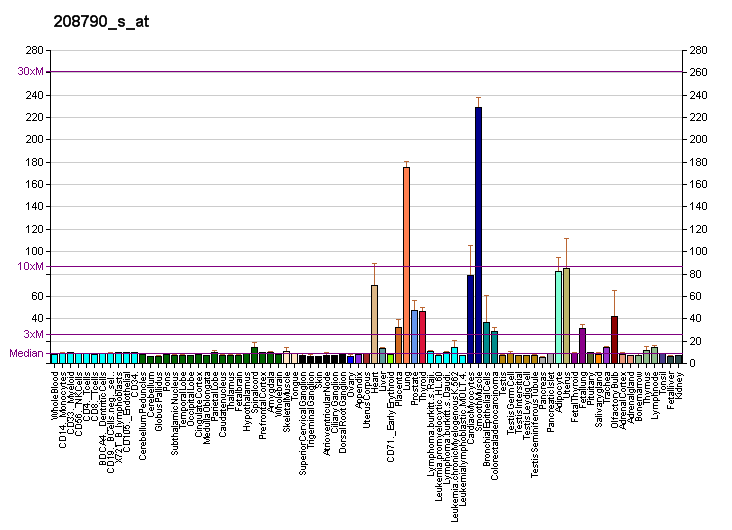

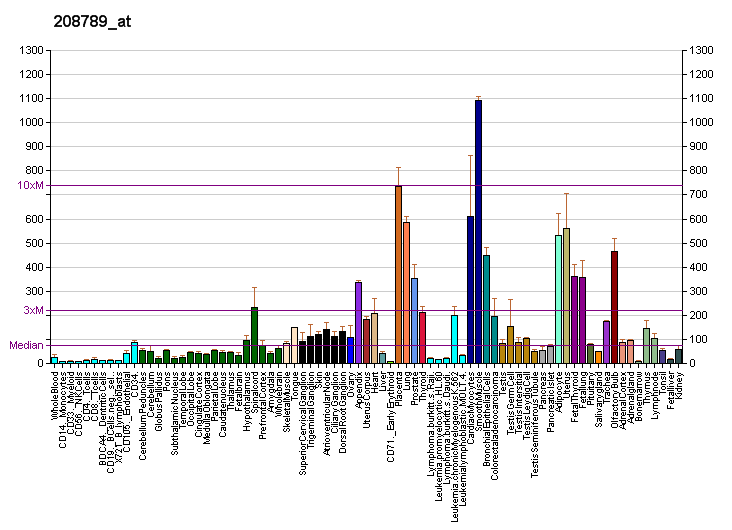
RNA expression pattern
Bgee	Human / Mouse (ortholog); Top expressed in: right coronary artery; tendon of biceps brachii; popliteal artery; tibial arteries; Descending thoracic aorta; saphenous vein; ascending aorta; left coronary artery; body of uterus; gastric mucosa / Top expressed in: lactiferous gland; ascending aorta; aortic valve; umbilical cord; white adipose tissue; ankle joint; gastrula; subcutaneous adipose tissue; plantaris muscle; tunica media of zone of aorta; More reference expression data
BioGPS	More reference expression data
Gene ontology
Molecular function	rRNA binding; rRNA primary transcript binding; protein binding; RNA binding; identical protein binding
Cellular component	cytoplasm; cytosol; membrane; nucleoplasm; endoplasmic reticulum; mitochondrion; caveola; membrane raft; nucleus; plasma membrane; intracellular membrane-bounded organelle; protein-containing complex
Biological process	termination of RNA polymerase I transcription; regulation of transcription, DNA-templated; transcription initiation from RNA polymerase I promoter; DNA-templated transcription, termination; transcription, DNA-templated; rRNA transcription; positive regulation of cell motility; protein secretion
Sources:Amigo / QuickGO
Orthologs
Databases	NCBI: entry; OMA: entry
Species	Human	Mouse
Entrez	284119	19285
Ensembl	ENSG00000177469	ENSMUSG00000004044
UniProt	Q6NZI2	O54724
RefSeq (mRNA)	NM_012232	NM_008986; NM_001359105; NM_027160
RefSeq (protein)	NP_036364	NP_033012; NP_001346034
Location (UCSC)	Chr 17: 42.4 – 42.42 Mb	Chr 11: 100.85 – 100.86 Mb
PubMed search
- Wikidata
View/Edit Human	View/Edit Mouse

Caveolae-associated protein 1, also known as Cavin-1, is a protein which in humans is encoded by the CAVIN1 gene (previously PTRF).

== Function ==
PTRF (Cavin1) has been shown to be crucial for caveola formation and function. Deformation caveolae promotes the translocation of cavin-1 from caveolae to the nucleus

Termination of RNA polymerase I catalyzed transcription is a 2-step process that involves pausing of transcription elongation and release of both the pre-ribosomal RNA and Pol I from the DNA template. The pausing is mediated by TTF1 and PTRF.

PTRF is a soluble protein containing putative leucine zipper, nuclear localization signal, and PEST domains.

== Interactions ==
PTRF (Cavin1) forms trimers with Cavin2 and Cavin3 in caveola formation and has been shown to interact with other membrane associating proteins such as EHD2 and caveolins.

PTRF has been shown to interact with ZNF148.
