= Caveolin 3 =

Protein found in humans

CAV3

Identifiers
- Aliases: CAV3, LGMD1C, LQT9, VIP-21, VIP21, caveolin 3, MPDT, RMD2
- External IDs: OMIM: 601253; MGI: 107570; GeneCards: CAV3

Gene location (Human)
Chr.	Chromosome 3 (human)
Band	3p25.3	Start	8,733,802 bp
Band	3p25.3	End	8,841,808 bp

Gene location (Mouse)
Chr.	Chromosome 6 (mouse)
Band	6 E3|6 52.26 cM	Start	112,436,466 bp
Band	6 E3|6 52.26 cM	End	112,449,833 bp
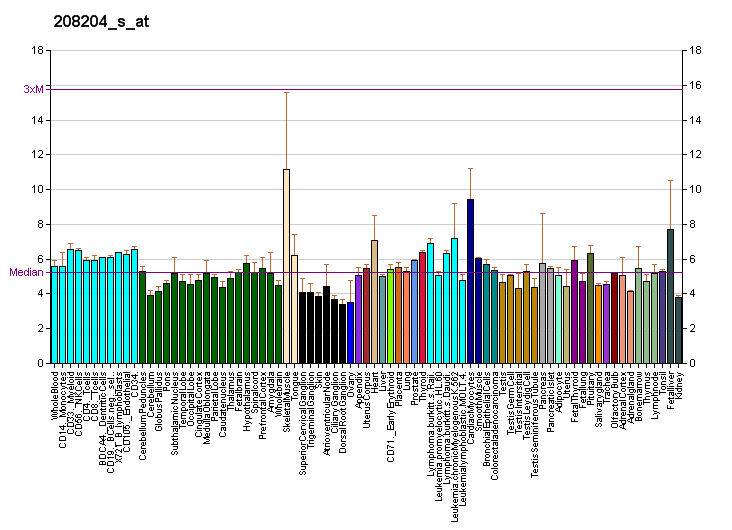
RNA expression pattern
Bgee	Human / Mouse (ortholog); Top expressed in: muscle of thigh; vastus lateralis muscle; triceps brachii muscle; Skeletal muscle tissue of rectus abdominis; biceps brachii; Skeletal muscle tissue of biceps brachii; thoracic diaphragm; gastrocnemius muscle; deltoid muscle; tibialis anterior muscle / Top expressed in: cardiac muscle tissue of left ventricle; interventricular septum; plantaris muscle; soleus muscle; extensor digitorum longus muscle; temporal muscle; masseter muscle; thoracic diaphragm; extraocular muscle; triceps brachii muscle; More reference expression data
BioGPS	More reference expression data
Gene ontology
Molecular function	transmembrane transporter binding; protein C-terminus binding; potassium channel inhibitor activity; calcium channel regulator activity; protein binding; molecular adaptor activity; sodium channel regulator activity; connexin binding; alpha-tubulin binding; protein-containing complex binding; enzyme binding; nitric-oxide synthase binding; structural molecule activity
Cellular component	cytoplasm; membrane; T-tubule; dystrophin-associated glycoprotein complex; cell surface; Z discdkac; endoplasmic reticulum; membrane raft; Golgi apparatus; intracellular membrane-bounded organelle; intercalated disc; neuromuscular junction; plasma membrane; vesicle; Golgi membrane; sarcolemma; caveola; protein-containing complex; integral component of plasma membrane; focal adhesion
Biological process	myotube differentiation; muscle contraction; regulation of heart contraction; muscle cell cellular homeostasis; negative regulation of cardiac muscle hypertrophy; negative regulation of membrane depolarization during cardiac muscle cell action potential; regulation of membrane potential; muscle organ development; regulation of calcium ion import; plasma membrane repair; regulation of signaling; membrane raft organization; regulation of sodium ion transmembrane transporter activity; positive regulation of microtubule polymerization; cholesterol homeostasis; triglyceride metabolic process; negative regulation of cell size; regulation of skeletal muscle contraction; T-tubule organization; regulation of ventricular cardiac muscle cell membrane depolarization; heart trabecula formation; glucose homeostasis; actin filament organization; cardiac muscle cell development; regulation of branching involved in mammary gland duct morphogenesis; ventricular cardiac muscle cell action potential; detection of muscle stretch; regulation of signal transduction by receptor internalization; negative regulation of cell growth involved in cardiac muscle cell development; negative regulation of MAP kinase activity; cytoplasmic microtubule organization; regulation of nerve growth factor receptor activity; regulation of protein kinase B signaling; negative regulation of potassium ion transmembrane transport; regulation of p38MAPK cascade; protein localization to plasma membrane; plasma membrane organization; regulation of membrane depolarization during cardiac muscle cell action potential; negative regulation of sarcomere organization; cell differentiation; negative regulation of protein kinase activity; nucleus localization; regulation of heart rate; negative regulation of protein localization to cell surface; positive regulation of ubiquitin-dependent protein catabolic process; negative regulation of MAPK cascade; myoblast fusion; regulation of calcium ion transmembrane transporter activity; protein localization; positive regulation of myotube differentiation; positive regulation of caveolin-mediated endocytosis; regulation of calcium ion transport; endocytosis; negative regulation of nitric-oxide synthase activity; caveola assembly; positive regulation of cytosolic calcium ion concentration; regulation of transforming growth factor beta receptor signaling pathway; negative regulation of potassium ion transmembrane transporter activity; positive regulation of cell population proliferation; negative regulation of calcium ion transport; regulation of cardiac muscle contraction; regulation of ventricular cardiac muscle cell membrane repolarization; regulation of cardiac muscle cell action potential involved in regulation of contraction; cellular response to organonitrogen compound
Sources:Amigo / QuickGO
Orthologs
Databases	NCBI: entry; OMA: entry
Species	Human	Mouse
Entrez	859	12391
Ensembl	ENSG00000182533	ENSMUSG00000062694
UniProt	P56539	P51637
RefSeq (mRNA)	NM_033337; NM_001234	NM_007617
RefSeq (protein)	NP_001225; NP_203123	NP_031643
Location (UCSC)	Chr 3: 8.73 – 8.84 Mb	Chr 6: 112.44 – 112.45 Mb
PubMed search
- Wikidata
View/Edit Human	View/Edit Mouse

Caveolin-3 is a protein that in humans is encoded by the CAV3 gene. Alternative splicing has been identified for this locus, with inclusion or exclusion of a differentially spliced intron. In addition, transcripts utilize multiple polyA sites and contain two potential translation initiation sites.

== Function ==
This gene encodes a caveolin family member, which functions as a component of the caveolae plasma membranes found in most cell types. Caveolin proteins are proposed to be scaffolding proteins for organizing and concentrating certain caveolin-interacting molecules.

== Clinical significance ==
Mutations identified in this gene lead to interference with protein oligomerization or intra-cellular routing, disrupting caveolae formation and resulting in Limb-Girdle muscular dystrophy type-1C (LGMD-1C), HyperCKemia, distal myopathy or rippling muscle disease (RMD). Other mutations in Caveolin causes Long QT Syndrome or familial hypertrophic cardiomyopathy, although the role of Cav3 in Long QT syndrome has recently been disputed.

== Interactions ==
Caveolin 3 has been shown to interact with a range of different proteins, including, but not limited to:

- DAG1,
- DYSF,
- EGFR, and
- RYR1.

== Structure ==
Using transmission electron microscopy and single particle analysis methods, it has been shown that nine Caveolin-3 monomers assemble to form a complex that is toroidal in shape, ~16.5 nm in diameter and ~5.5 nm in height.

== Cardiac physiology ==
Caveolin-3 is one of three isoforms of the protein caveolin. Caveolin-3 is concentrated in the caveolae of myocytes, and modulates numerous metabolic processes including: nitric oxide synthesis, cholesterol metabolism, and cardiac myocytes contraction. There are many proteins that associate with caveolin-3, including ion channels and exchangers.

=== Associations with ion channels ===
==== ATP-dependent potassium channels ====
In cardiac myocytes, caveolin-3 negatively regulates ATP-dependent potassium channels (K_{ATP}) localized in caveolae. K_{ATP} channel opening decreases significantly when interacting with caveolin-3; other isoforms of caveolin do not show this type of effect on K_{ATP} channels. The amount of K_{ATP}activation during times of biological stress influences the amount of cellular damage that will occur, thus regulation of caveolin-3 expression during these times influences the amount of cellular damage.

==== Sodium-calcium exchanger ====
Caveolin-3 associates with the cardiac sodium-calcium exchanger (NCX) in caveolae of cardiac myocytes. This association occurs predominately in areas proximate to the peripheral membrane of cardiac myocytes. Interactions between caveolin-3 and cardiac NCX influence NCX-regulation of cellular signaling factors and excitation of cardiac myocytes.

==== L-Type calcium channel ====
Caveolin-3 influences the opening of L-Type calcium channels (LTCC) which play a role in cardiac myocyte contraction. Disruption of interactions between caveolin-3 and its associated binding proteins has been shown to affect LTCC. Specifically, disruption of caveolin-3 decreases the basal and b_{2}-adrenergic-stimulated opening probabilities of LTCC. This occurs by changing the PKA-mediated phosphorylation of caveolin-3-associated binding proteins, causing negative down-stream effects on LTCC activity.

=== Implications in disease ===
Alterations in caveolin-3 expression have been implicated in the altered expression and regulation of numerous signaling molecules involved in cardiomyopathies. Disruption of caveolin-3 disturbs the structure of cardiac caveolae and blocks atrial natriuretic peptide (ANP) expression, a cardiac-related hormone involved in many functions including maintaining cellular homeostasis. Normal caveolin-3 expression under conditions of stress increases cardiac cellular levels of ANP, maintaining cardiac homeostasis. Mutations have been identified in the caveolin-3 gene that result in cardiomyopathies. Several of these mutations influence caveolin-3 function by reducing the expression of its cell-surface domains. Mutations resulting in loss-of-function of caveolin-3 cause cardiac myocyte hypertrophy, dilation of the heart, and depression of fractional shortening. Knockout of caveolin-3 genes are sufficient to induce these manifestations. Similarly, dominant-negative genotypes for caveolin-3 increase cardiac hypertrophy, whereas increased expression of caveolin-3 inhibits the ability of the heart to hypertrophy, implicating caveolin-3 as a negative regulator of cardiac hypertrophy. Overexpression of caveolin-3 leads to the development of cardiomyopathy, resulting in degeneration of cardiac tissue and manifesting pathologies due to the associated degeneration.
