= Caveolin =

Family of integral membrane proteins

Identifiers
- Symbol: Caveolin
- Pfam: PF01146
- InterPro: IPR001612
- PROSITE: PDOC00930
Available protein structures:
- PDB: IPR001612 PF01146 (ECOD; PDBsum)
- AlphaFold: IPR001612; PF01146

Caveolin 1, caveolae protein, 22kDa

Identifiers
- Symbol: CAV1
- Alt. symbols: CAV
- NCBI gene: 857
- HGNC: 1527
- OMIM: 601047
- RefSeq: NM_001753
- UniProt: Q03135

Other data
- Locus: Chr. 7 q31
Search for
- Structures: Swiss-model
- Domains: InterPro

Caveolin 2

Identifiers
- Symbol: CAV2
- NCBI gene: 858
- HGNC: 1528
- OMIM: 601048
- RefSeq: NM_001233
- UniProt: P51636

Other data
- Locus: Chr. 7 q31
Search for
- Structures: Swiss-model
- Domains: InterPro

Caveolin 3

Identifiers
- Symbol: CAV3
- NCBI gene: 859
- HGNC: 1529
- OMIM: 601253
- RefSeq: NM_001234
- UniProt: P56539

Other data
- Locus: Chr. 3 p25
Search for
- Structures: Swiss-model
- Domains: InterPro

In molecular biology, caveolins are a family of integral membrane proteins that are the principal components of caveolae membranes and involved in receptor-independent endocytosis. Caveolins may act as scaffolding proteins within caveolar membranes by compartmentalizing and concentrating signaling molecules. They also induce positive (inward) membrane curvature by way of oligomerization, and hairpin insertion. Various classes of signaling molecules, including G-protein subunits, receptor and non-receptor tyrosine kinases, endothelial nitric oxide synthase (eNOS), and small GTPases, bind Cav-1 through its 'caveolin-scaffolding domain'.

The caveolin gene family has three members in vertebrates: CAV1, CAV2, and CAV3, coding for the proteins caveolin-1, caveolin-2, and caveolin-3, respectively. All three members are membrane proteins with similar structure. Caveolin forms oligomers and associates with cholesterol and sphingolipids in certain areas of the cell membrane, leading to the formation of caveolae.

== Structure and expression ==
The caveolins are similar in structure. They all form hairpin loops that are inserted into the cell membrane. Both the C-terminus and the N-terminus face the cytoplasmic side of the membrane. There are two isoforms of caveolin-1: caveolin-1α and caveolin-1β, the latter lacking a part of the N-terminus.

Caveolins are found in the majority of adherent, mammalian cells.

- Caveolin-1 is most prominently expressed in endothelial, fibrous, and adipose tissue.
- The expression pattern of caveolin-2 is similar to that of caveolin-1; it seems to be co-expressed with caveolin-1.
- The expression of caveolin-3 is restricted to striated and smooth muscle.

== Function ==
The functions of caveolins are still under intensive investigation. They are best known for their role in the formation of 50-nanometer-size invaginations of the plasma membrane, called caveolae. Oligomers of caveolin form the coat of these domains. Cells that lack caveolins also lack caveolae. Many functions are ascribed to these domains, ranging from endocytosis and transcytosis to signal transduction.

Caveolin-1 has also been shown to play a role in the integrin signaling. The tyrosine phosphorylated form of caveolin-1 colocalizes with focal adhesions, suggesting a role for caveolin-1 in migration. Indeed, downregulation of caveolin-1 leads to less efficient migration in vitro.

Genetically engineered mice that lack caveolin-1 and caveolin-2 are viable and fertile, showing that neither the caveolins nor the caveolae are essential in embryonic development or reproduction of these animals. However, knock-out animals do develop abnormal, hypertrophic lungs, and cardiac myopathy, leading to a reduction in lifespan. Mice lacking caveolins also suffer from impaired angiogenic responses as well as abnormal responses to vasoconstrictive stimuli. In zebrafish, lack of caveolins leads to embryonic lethality, suggesting that higher vertebrates (as exemplified by mice) have developed compensation or redundancy for the functions of caveolins.

== Role in disease ==
=== Cancer ===
Caveolins have a paradoxical role in the development of this disease. They have been implicated in both tumor suppression and oncogenesis. High expression of caveolins leads to inhibition of cancer-related pathways, such as growth factor signaling pathways. However, certain cancer cells that express caveolins have been shown to be more aggressive and metastatic, because of a potential for anchorage-independent growth.

=== Cardiovascular diseases ===
Caveolins are thought to play an important role during the development of atherosclerosis. Furthermore, caveolin-3 has been associated with long QT syndrome.

=== Muscular dystrophy ===
Caveolin-3 has been implicated in the development of certain types of muscular dystrophy (limb-girdle muscular dystrophy).
