= BSCL2 =

Protein-coding gene in the species Homo sapiens

Identifiers
- Aliases: BSCL2, GNG3LG, HMN5, PELD, SPG17, Berardinelli-Seip congenital lipodystrophy 2 (seipin), seipin lipid droplet biogenesis associated, BSCL2 lipid droplet biogenesis associated, seipin, HMN5C
- External IDs: OMIM: 606158; MGI: 1298392; HomoloGene: 32032; GeneCards: BSCL2; OMA:BSCL2 - orthologs

Gene location (Human)
Chr.	Chromosome 11 (human)
Band	11q12.3	Start	62,689,289 bp
Band	11q12.3	End	62,709,845 bp

Gene location (Mouse)
Chr.	Chromosome 19 (mouse)
Band	19 A|19 5.76 cM	Start	8,814,831 bp
Band	19 A|19 5.76 cM	End	8,826,047 bp
RNA expression pattern
Bgee	Human / Mouse (ortholog); Top expressed in: superior frontal gyrus; primary visual cortex; pituitary gland; anterior pituitary; right testis; Brodmann area 9; left testis; nucleus accumbens; caudate nucleus; hypothalamus / Top expressed in: tunica adventitia of aorta; seminiferous tubule; white adipose tissue; brown adipose tissue; subcutaneous adipose tissue; facial motor nucleus; motor neuron; fossa; paraventricular nucleus of hypothalamus; condyle; More reference expression data
BioGPS	n/a
Gene ontology
Molecular function	protein binding; molecular function
Cellular component	integral component of membrane; integral component of endoplasmic reticulum membrane; endoplasmic reticulum; endoplasmic reticulum membrane; membrane
Biological process	lipid catabolic process; lipid storage; negative regulation of lipid catabolic process; fat cell differentiation; lipid droplet organization; lipid metabolism; positive regulation of cold-induced thermogenesis
Sources:Amigo / QuickGO
Orthologs
Species	Human	Mouse
Entrez	26580	14705
Ensembl	ENSG00000168000	ENSMUSG00000071657
UniProt	Q96G97	Q9Z2E9
RefSeq (mRNA)	NM_001122955; NM_001130702; NM_032667; NM_001386027; NM_001386028	NM_001136064; NM_001290823; NM_008144
RefSeq (protein)	NP_001116427; NP_001124174; NP_116056	NP_001129536; NP_001277752; NP_032170
Location (UCSC)	Chr 11: 62.69 – 62.71 Mb	Chr 19: 8.81 – 8.83 Mb
PubMed search
- Wikidata
View/Edit Human	View/Edit Mouse

Seipin is a protein that in humans is encoded by the BSCL2 gene.

== Clinical significance ==
Mutations in BSCL2 are known to cause the following conditions:

- Congenital generalized lipodystrophy type 2;
- Spastic paraplegia 17, autosomal dominant (SPG17);
- Neuronopathy, distal hereditary motor, 5C (HMN5C);
- Encephalopathy, progressive, with or without lipodystrophy (PELD).
