= Dunnigan familial partial lipodystrophy =

Familial Partial Lipodystrophy, Dunnigan Type
- Autosomal dominant is the manner of inheritance of this condition

Dunnigan-type familial partial lipodystrophy, also known as FPLD Type II and abbreviated as (FPLD2), is a rare monogenic form of insulin resistance characterized by loss of subcutaneous fat from the extremities, trunk, and gluteal region. FPLD recapitulates the main metabolic attributes of the insulin resistance syndrome, including central obesity, hyperinsulinemia, glucose intolerance and diabetes usually type 2, dyslipidemia, hypertension, and early endpoints of atherosclerosis. It can also result in hepatic steatosis. FPLD results from mutations in LMNA gene, which is the gene that encodes nuclear lamins A and C. The condition is named after Scottish doctor Matthew Dunnigan, who pioneered early study into the disorder.

== See also ==
- Familial partial lipodystrophy
- Priscilla Lopes-Schliep
