= GPAT3 =

Protein found in humans

Identifiers
- Aliases: GPAT3, AGPAT 10, AGPAT8, LPAAT-theta, MAG1, AGPAT9, HMFN0839, AGPAT10, glycerol-3-phosphate acyltransferase 3
- External IDs: OMIM: 610958; MGI: 3603816; GeneCards: GPAT3
Enzyme activity
EC #	BRENDA	ExPASy	KEGG	MetaCyc
2.3.1.15	↗	↗	↗	↗
2.3.1.51	↗	↗	↗	↗

Gene location (Human)
Chr.	Chromosome 4 (human)
Band	4q21.23	Start	83,535,914 bp
Band	4q21.23	End	83,605,875 bp

Gene location (Mouse)
Chr.	Chromosome 5 (mouse)
Band	5|5 E4	Start	100,993,579 bp
Band	5|5 E4	End	101,046,968 bp
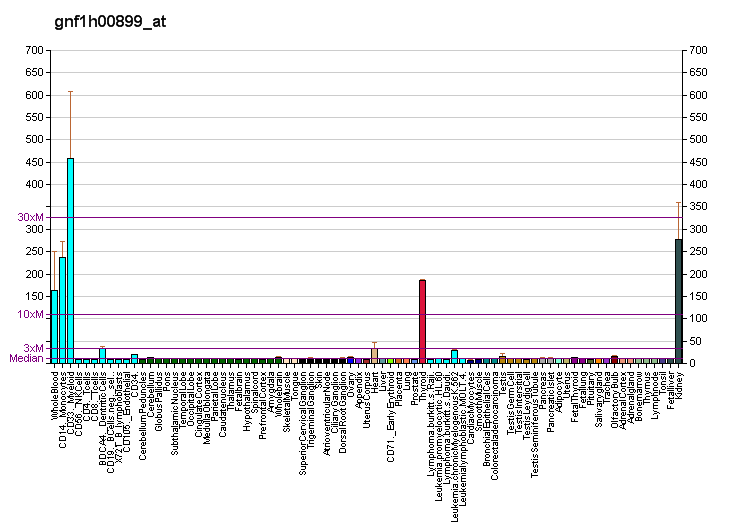
RNA expression pattern
Bgee	Human / Mouse (ortholog); Top expressed in: secondary oocyte; jejunal mucosa; mucosa of ileum; myocardium of left ventricle; renal medulla; Skeletal muscle tissue of rectus abdominis; cardiac muscle tissue of right atrium; pancreatic epithelial cell; buccal mucosa cell; duodenum / Top expressed in: jejunum; mammary gland; white adipose tissue; morula; pineal gland; granulocyte; ileum; subcutaneous adipose tissue; duodenum; epithelium of small intestine; More reference expression data
BioGPS	More reference expression data
Gene ontology
Molecular function	transferase activity; acyltransferase activity; glycerol-3-phosphate O-acyltransferase activity; 1-acylglycerol-3-phosphate O-acyltransferase activity; sn-1-glycerol-3-phosphate C16:0-DCA-CoA acyl transferase activity
Cellular component	integral component of membrane; endoplasmic reticulum membrane; endoplasmic reticulum; membrane
Biological process	phosphatidic acid biosynthetic process; CDP-diacylglycerol biosynthetic process; metabolism; regulation of TOR signaling; lipid metabolism; phospholipid biosynthetic process; triglyceride biosynthetic process
Sources:Amigo / QuickGO
Orthologs
Databases	NCBI: entry; OMA: entry
Species	Human	Mouse
Entrez	84803	231510
Ensembl	ENSG00000138678	ENSMUSG00000029314
UniProt	Q53EU6	Q8C0N2
RefSeq (mRNA)	NM_001256421; NM_001256422; NM_032717	NM_172715
RefSeq (protein)	NP_001243350; NP_001243351; NP_116106	NP_766303
Location (UCSC)	Chr 4: 83.54 – 83.61 Mb	Chr 5: 100.99 – 101.05 Mb
PubMed search
- Wikidata
View/Edit Human	View/Edit Mouse

Glycerol-3-phosphate acyltransferase 3 (GPAT-3) is an enzyme that in humans is encoded by the GPAT3 gene (previously AGPAT9). GPAT-3 has also been called 1-acylglycerol-3-phosphate O-acyltransferase 9 (AGPAT9), lysophosphatidic acid acyltransferase theta (LPAAT-theta), and lung cancer metastasis-associated protein 1.

== Function ==
Glycerol-3-phosphate (G3P) acyltransferases (GPAT; EC 2.3.1.15), such as GPAM and GPAT3 (this enzyme), catalyze the initial step of de novo triacylglycerol (TAG) synthesis by converting glycerol-3-phosphate (G3P) to lysophosphatidic acid (LPA).
