= Familial partial lipodystrophy =

- Other names: FPLD
- Specialty: Dermatology, endocrinology
- Frequency: 0.0005%

Familial partial lipodystrophy, also known as Köbberling–Dunnigan syndrome, is a rare genetic metabolic condition characterized by the loss of subcutaneous fat.

FPL also refers to a rare metabolic condition in which there is a loss of subcutaneous fat in the arms, legs and lower torso. The upper section of the body, face, neck, shoulders, back and trunk carry an excess amount of fat.

As the body is unable to store fat correctly this leads to fat around all the vital organs and in the blood (triglycerides). This results in heart problems, cirrhosis of the liver, lipoatrophic diabetes, and pancreatitis, along with various other complications.

== Types ==
OMIM	Name	Locus
608600	FPLD1 (Kobberling-type, loss from extremities)	?
151660	FPLD2 (Dunnigan-type, loss from limbs and trunk)	LMNA; 1q21.2
604367	FPLD3	PPARG; 7q11.23-q21.11, 3p25

== Presentation ==
Type 1 is believed to be underdiagnosed.

== Genetics ==
A mutations in a number of genes have been associated with this condition. Mutations associated with FPL have been reported in LMNA (lamin A/C), PPARG (PPARγ), AKT2 (AKT serine/threonine kinase 2), PLIN1 (perilipin-1), and CIDEC (cell-death-inducing DFFA-like effector B).

Six types (1-6) have been described. Types 1-5 are inherited in an autosomal dominant fashion.

Type 1 (Kobberling variety, FPL1) is very rare and has only been reported in women to date. Fat loss is confined to the limbs and mostly in the distal parts. Central obesity may be present. Complications include hypertension, insulin resistance and hypertriglyceridemia. The gene causing this condition is not yet known. This form was first described in 1975.

Type 2 (Dunnigan Variety, FPL2) is the most common form and is due to mutations in the LMNA gene. Over 500 cases have been reported to date. Development up to puberty is normal. Fat is then gradually lost in is the limbs and trunk. Fat may accumulate around the face and between the shoulder blades. Insulin resistance is common. Other conditions associated with this condition include acanthosis nigricans, fatty liver, hypertriglyceridemia and polyendocrine metabolic ovarian syndrome (PMOS) in women. There is an increased risk of coronary heart disease. Cardiomyopathy and muscular dystrophy may occur rarely. Xanthoma and nail changes may occur.

Type 3 is due to mutations in the PPARG gene. It is rare with approximately 30 cases reported to date. It is similar to type 2 but tends to be milder.

Type 4 is due to mutations in the PLIN1 gene. It is rare with only a small number of cases reported. Fat loss tends to affect the lower limbs and buttocks. Insulin resistance and hypertriglyceridemia occur. Calf muscular hypertrophy may occur.

Type 5 is due to mutations in the AKT2 gene. It has been reported in four patients all members of the same family. Fat loss affects the upper and lower limbs. The patients also had hypertension, insulin resistance and hypertriglyceridemia.

Type 6 due to mutations in the CIDEC gene. It is inherited in an autosomal recessive fashion and has been reported in only one patient to date. Features included fat loss, severe insulin resistance, fatty liver, acanthosis nigricans and diabetes.

Another gene that has been associated with this condition is AGPAT2.

== Prevalence ==
This not known with certainty but is estimated to be about one per million. It appears to be more common in females than males.

== See also ==
- Lipodystrophy
- List of cutaneous conditions
