= Autotaxin =

Protein-coding gene in the species Homo sapiens

ENPP2
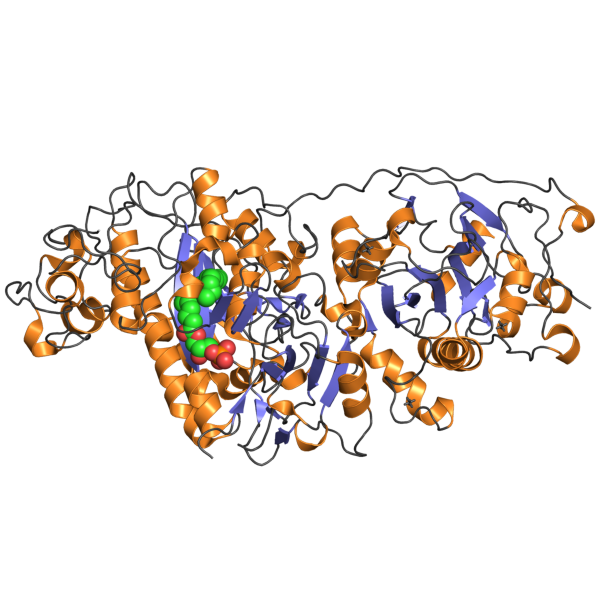

Identifiers
- Aliases: ENPP2, ATX, ATX-X, AUTOTAXIN, LysoPLD, NPP2, PD-IALPHA, PDNP2, ectonucleotide pyrophosphatase/phosphodiesterase 2
- External IDs: OMIM: 601060; MGI: 1321390; GeneCards: ENPP2
Available structures
PDB	Ortholog search: PDBe RCSB
PDB	List of PDB id codes 4ZGA, 4ZG6, 4ZG9, 4ZG7
Enzyme activity
EC #	BRENDA	ExPASy	KEGG	MetaCyc
3.1.4.4	↗	↗	↗	↗
3.1.4.39	↗	↗	↗	↗

Gene location (Human)
Chr.	Chromosome 8 (human)
Band	8q24.12	Start	119,557,086 bp
Band	8q24.12	End	119,673,453 bp

Gene location (Mouse)
Chr.	Chromosome 15 (mouse)
Band	15|15 D1	Start	54,838,901 bp
Band	15|15 D1	End	54,952,892 bp
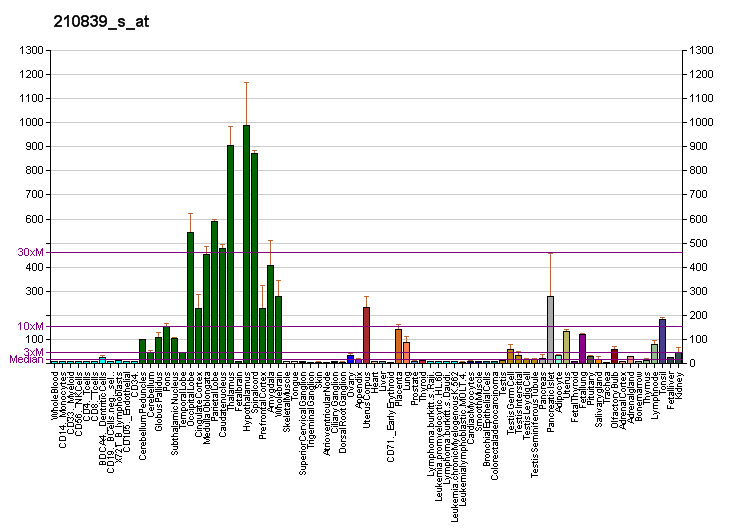

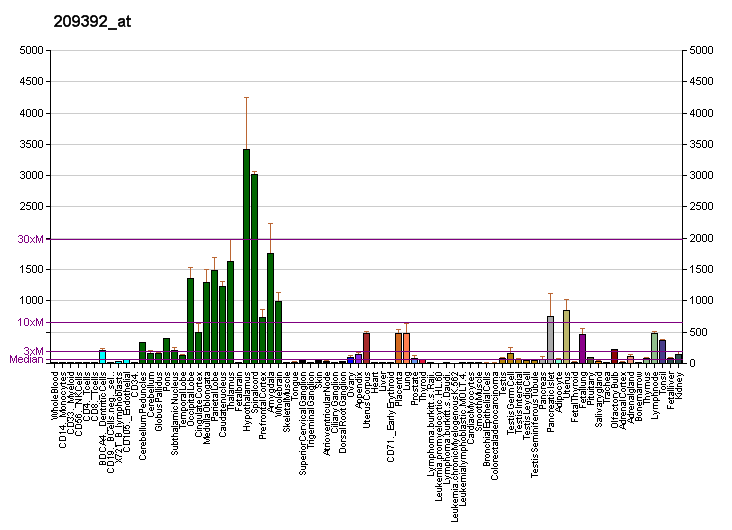
RNA expression pattern
Bgee	Human / Mouse (ortholog); Top expressed in: retinal pigment epithelium; Epithelium of choroid plexus; inferior ganglion of vagus nerve; corpus callosum; endothelial cell; subthalamic nucleus; pons; superior vestibular nucleus; middle frontal gyrus; external globus pallidus / Top expressed in: Epithelium of choroid plexus; retinal pigment epithelium; fourth ventricle; choroid plexus of fourth ventricle; deep cerebellar nuclei; iris; mesenteric lymph nodes; globus pallidus; nucleus of stria terminalis; habenula; More reference expression data
BioGPS	More reference expression data
Gene ontology
Molecular function	nucleotide diphosphatase activity; phosphodiesterase I activity; transcription factor binding; polysaccharide binding; metal ion binding; scavenger receptor activity; catalytic activity; alkylglycerophosphoethanolamine phosphodiesterase activity; nucleic acid binding; hydrolase activity; calcium ion binding; lysophospholipase activity; zinc ion binding
Cellular component	plasma membrane; integral component of plasma membrane; extracellular region; extracellular space; cytoplasm; Golgi apparatus
Biological process	G protein-coupled receptor signaling pathway; regulation of cell migration; positive regulation of lamellipodium morphogenesis; lipid metabolism; positive regulation of epithelial cell migration; regulation of angiogenesis; receptor-mediated endocytosis; lipid catabolic process; immune response; phospholipid catabolic process; positive regulation of peptidyl-tyrosine phosphorylation; phosphate-containing compound metabolic process; metabolism; chemotaxis; phosphatidylcholine catabolic process; nucleic acid phosphodiester bond hydrolysis; cell motility; phospholipid metabolic process; negative regulation of cell-matrix adhesion; positive regulation of cell population proliferation; diencephalon development; forebrain development; midbrain development; positive regulation of oligodendrocyte differentiation; positive regulation of focal adhesion assembly; cell chemotaxis; cellular response to cadmium ion; cellular response to estradiol stimulus; positive regulation of substrate adhesion-dependent cell spreading; response to polycyclic arene; vesicle-mediated transport; endocytosis
Sources:Amigo / QuickGO
Orthologs
Databases	NCBI: entry; OMA: entry
Species	Human	Mouse
Entrez	5168	18606
Ensembl	ENSG00000136960	ENSMUSG00000022425
UniProt	Q13822	Q9R1E6
RefSeq (mRNA)	NM_001040092; NM_001130863; NM_006209; NM_001330600	NM_001136077; NM_015744; NM_001285994; NM_001285995
RefSeq (protein)	NP_001035181; NP_001124335; NP_001317529; NP_006200	NP_001129549; NP_001272923; NP_001272924; NP_056559
Location (UCSC)	Chr 8: 119.56 – 119.67 Mb	Chr 15: 54.84 – 54.95 Mb
PubMed search
- Wikidata
View/Edit Human	View/Edit Mouse

Autotaxin, also known as ectonucleotide pyrophosphatase/phosphodiesterase 2 (E-NPP 2), is an enzyme that in humans is encoded by the ENPP2 gene.

== Naming ==
The molecule was named "autotaxin" by its discoverers since it acted like an "autocrine motility factor" in their investigations. Although its effects are receptor-mediated (as they inferred), this may be indirect through its enzymatic production of signaling molecules.

== Structure ==
Autotaxin is a multi-domain protein with a modular architecture. From the N- to the C-terminus, it comprises two consecutive N-terminal cysteine-rich somatomedin B-like (SMB) domains, followed by a central catalytic phosphodiesterase (PDE) domain and a C-terminal nuclease-like (NUC) domain. The two SMB domains mediate protein–protein interactions, particularly through integrin-dependent binding to cell surfaces. The catalytic PDE domain, which is structurally related to alkaline phosphatases, harbors the enzyme's lysophospholipase D activity responsible for converting lysophosphatidylcholine into lysophosphatidic acid (LPA). The C-terminal NUC domain, although catalytically inactive, is structurally linked to the PDE domain and contributes to substrate binding and overall protein stability. A region at the extreme C-terminus, sometimes referred to as the MORFO domain, overlaps with the NUC region and has been associated with oligodendrocyte remodeling. Thus, the domain organization from N- to C-terminus is: SMB1–SMB2–PDE–NUC, with the MORFO domain often considered part of or overlapping with the NUC domain.

The crystal structures of rat and mouse autotaxin have been determined, including both apo and ligand-bound forms. Each structure reveals four domains: two N-terminal somatomedin-B-like domains likely involved in cell-surface localization, the catalytic PDE domain containing a deep hydrophobic pocket for lipid substrate binding, and the C-terminal inactive NUC domain, which appears to stabilize the overall structure.

== Function ==
Autotaxin is a secreted enzyme important for generating the lipid signaling molecule lysophosphatidic acid (LPA). Autotaxin has lysophospholipase D activity that converts lysophosphatidylcholine into LPA.

Autotaxin was originally identified as a tumor cell-motility-stimulating factor; later it was shown to be LPA (which signals through lysophospholipid receptors), the lipid product of the reaction catalyzed by autotaxin, which is responsible for its effects on cell-proliferation.

The protein encoded by this gene functions as a phosphodiesterase. Autotaxin is secreted and further processed to make the biologically active form. Several alternatively spliced transcript variants have been identified. Autotaxin is able to cleave the phosphodiester bond between the α and the β position of triphosphate nucleotides, acting as an ectonucleotide phosphodiesterase producing pyrophosphate, as most members of the ENPP family. Importantly, autotaxin also acts as phospholipase, catalyzing the removal of the head group of various lysolipids. The physiological function of autotaxin is the production of the signalling lipid lysophosphatidic acid (LPA) in extracellular fluids. LPA evokes growth factor-like responses including stimulation of cell proliferation and chemotaxis. This gene product stimulates the motility of tumor cells, has angiogenic properties, and its expression is up-regulated in several kinds of tumours. Also, autotaxin and LPA are involved in numerous inflammatory-driven diseases such as asthma and arthritis. Physiologically, LPA helps promote wound healing responses to tissue damage. Under normal circumstances, LPA negatively regulates autotaxin transcription, but in the context of wound repair, cytokines induce autotaxin expression to increase overall LPA concentrations.

== As a drug target ==
Autotaxin contains a tripartite binding site composed of a zinc-dependent catalytic center, a hydrophilic groove, and a hydrophobic pocket. Based on how inhibitors interact with this site, ATX inhibitors can be classified into six types: Type I compounds occupy the orthosteric site, mimicking the LPC substrate binding; Type II inhibitors bind solely to the hydrophobic pocket, blocking LPC accommodation; Type III inhibitors occupy the allosteric regulatory tunnel, modulating ATX activity non-competitively; Type IV compounds occupy both the binding pocket and the tunnel without contacting the catalytic site; Type V inhibitors occupy the allosteric tunnel and the orthosteric site; and Type VI compounds engage all three regions—the orthosteric site, allosteric tunnel, and hydrophobic pocket.

A type IV inhibitor, Ziritaxestat (GLPG1690), against idiopathic pulmonary fibrosis showed promising results in a phase II trial that ended in May 2018. It has been shown that THC is also a partial autotaxin inhibitor, with an apparent IC50 of 407 ± 67 nM for the ATX-gamma isoform. THC was also co-crystallized with autotaxin, deciphering the binding interface of the complex. These results might explain some of the effects of THC on inflammation and neurological diseases, since autotaxin is responsible of LPA generation, a key lipid mediator involved in numerous diseases and physiological processes. However, clinical trials need to be performed in order to assess the importance of ATX inhibition by THC during medicinal cannabis consumption. Development of cannabinoid inspired autotaxin inhibitors could also be an option in the future. A DNA aptamer inhibitor of Autotaxin has also been described.

== See also ==
- Lysophosphatidic acid
- Lysophospholipid receptors
- Lipid signaling
- Phospholipases
