= Sushi domain containing 2 =

Protein found in humans

SUSD2

Identifiers
- Aliases: SUSD2, BK65A6.2, sushi domain containing 2, W5C5
- External IDs: OMIM: 615825; MGI: 1918983; GeneCards: SUSD2

Gene location (Human)
Chr.	Chromosome 22 (human)
Band	22q11.23	Start	24,181,487 bp
Band	22q11.23	End	24,189,106 bp

Gene location (Mouse)
Chr.	Chromosome 10 (mouse)
Band	10|10 C1	Start	75,472,540 bp
Band	10|10 C1	End	75,479,842 bp
RNA expression pattern
Bgee	Human / Mouse (ortholog); Top expressed in: mucosa of ileum; lower lobe of lung; right lung; upper lobe of lung; upper lobe of left lung; right coronary artery; popliteal artery; tibial arteries; left coronary artery; skin of arm / Top expressed in: epithelium of lens; intestinal villus; right kidney; facial motor nucleus; umbilical cord; skin of external ear; human kidney; lacrimal gland; proximal tubule; lip; More reference expression data
BioGPS	n/a
Gene ontology
Molecular function	scavenger receptor activity; polysaccharide binding; protein binding
Cellular component	integral component of membrane; plasma membrane; extracellular exosome; membrane
Biological process	negative regulation of cell division; receptor-mediated endocytosis; immune response; negative regulation of cell cycle G1/S phase transition; vesicle-mediated transport; endocytosis
Sources:Amigo / QuickGO
Orthologs
Databases	NCBI: entry; OMA: entry
Species	Human	Mouse
Entrez	56241	71733
Ensembl	ENSG00000099994	ENSMUSG00000006342
UniProt	Q9UGT4	Q9DBX3
RefSeq (mRNA)	NM_019601	NM_001162913; NM_027890
RefSeq (protein)	NP_062547	NP_001156385; NP_082166
Location (UCSC)	Chr 22: 24.18 – 24.19 Mb	Chr 10: 75.47 – 75.48 Mb
PubMed search
- Wikidata
View/Edit Human	View/Edit Mouse

Sushi domain containing 2 is a protein located in the plasma membrane that, in humans, is encoded by the SUSD2 gene.

It's involved in the negative regulation of cell cycle G1/S phase transition and cell division, and possibly involved in maintaining cell state. It also regulates central nervous system (CNS) development.
