= AGPAT2 =

Protein-coding gene in the species Homo sapiens

Identifiers
- Aliases: AGPAT2, 1-BSCL, BSCL1, LPAAB, LPAAT-beta, 1-acylglycerol-3-phosphate O-acyltransferase 2
- External IDs: OMIM: 603100; MGI: 1914762; GeneCards: AGPAT2
Enzyme activity
EC #	BRENDA	ExPASy	KEGG	MetaCyc
2.3.1.51	↗	↗	↗	↗

Gene location (Human)
Chr.	Chromosome 9 (human)
Band	9q34.3	Start	136,673,143 bp
Band	9q34.3	End	136,687,457 bp

Gene location (Mouse)
Chr.	Chromosome 2 (mouse)
Band	2|2 A3	Start	26,483,069 bp
Band	2|2 A3	End	26,494,429 bp
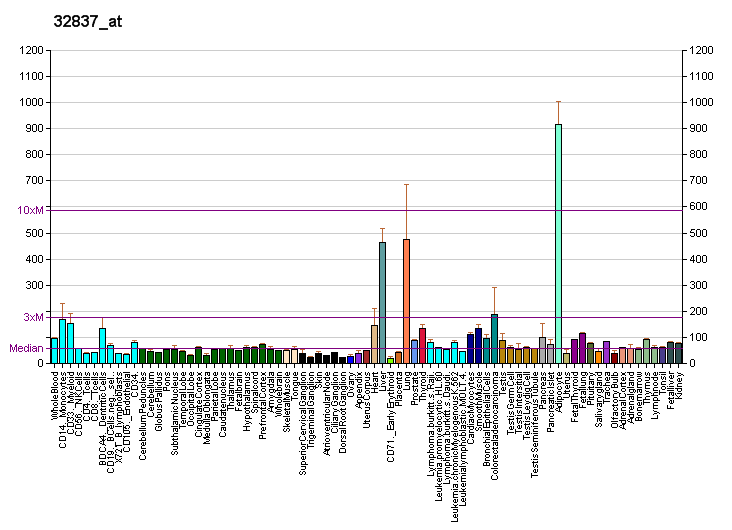

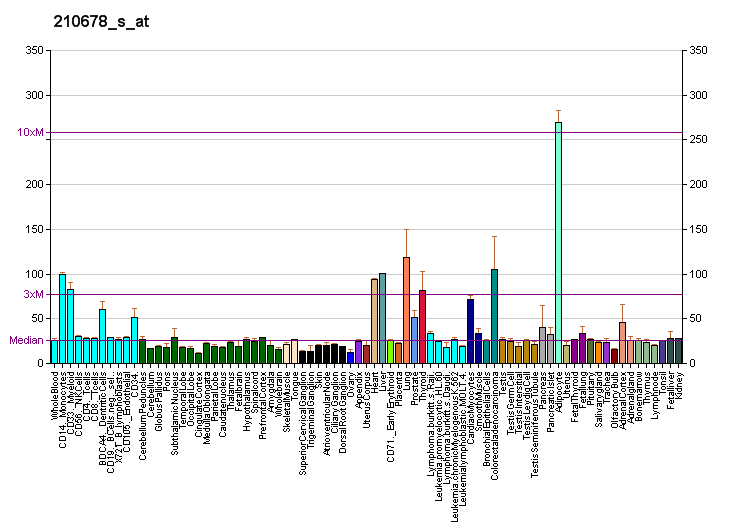
RNA expression pattern
Bgee	Human / Mouse (ortholog); Top expressed in: mucosa of transverse colon; mucosa of ileum; right lobe of liver; subcutaneous adipose tissue; body of pancreas; apex of heart; right auricle of heart; duodenum; right lung; upper lobe of left lung / Top expressed in: brown adipose tissue; subcutaneous adipose tissue; white adipose tissue; intercostal muscle; left lobe of liver; interventricular septum; granulocyte; jejunum; mammary gland; duodenum; More reference expression data
BioGPS	More reference expression data
Gene ontology
Molecular function	acyltransferase activity; transferase activity; 1-acylglycerol-3-phosphate O-acyltransferase activity
Cellular component	endoplasmic reticulum membrane; membrane; integral component of membrane; endoplasmic reticulum; plasma membrane; specific granule membrane
Biological process	phospholipid biosynthetic process; positive regulation of cytokine production; metabolism; CDP-diacylglycerol biosynthetic process; lipid metabolism; epidermis development; positive regulation of cytokine-mediated signaling pathway; phosphatidic acid biosynthetic process; phospholipid metabolic process; neutrophil degranulation
Sources:Amigo / QuickGO
Orthologs
Databases	NCBI: entry; OMA: entry
Species	Human	Mouse
Entrez	10555	67512
Ensembl	ENSG00000169692	ENSMUSG00000026922
UniProt	O15120	Q8K3K7
RefSeq (mRNA)	NM_006412; NM_001012727	NM_026212
RefSeq (protein)	NP_001012745; NP_006403	NP_080488
Location (UCSC)	Chr 9: 136.67 – 136.69 Mb	Chr 2: 26.48 – 26.49 Mb
PubMed search
- Wikidata
View/Edit Human	View/Edit Mouse

1-acyl-sn-glycerol-3-phosphate acyltransferase beta is an enzyme that in humans is encoded by the AGPAT2 gene.

== Function ==
This gene encodes a member of the 1-acylglycerol-3-phosphate O-acyltransferase family. The protein is located within the endoplasmic reticulum membrane and converts lysophosphatidic acid to phosphatidic acid, the second step in de novo phospholipid biosynthesis. Mutations in this gene have been associated with congenital generalized lipodystrophy, a disease characterized by a near absence of adipose tissue and severe insulin resistance. Alternate transcriptional splice variants, encoding different isoforms, have been characterized.
