= 1-acylglycerol-3-phosphate O-acyltransferase =

Class of enzymes

Identifiers
- EC no.: 2.3.1.51
- CAS no.: 51901-16-7

Databases
- IntEnz: IntEnz view
- BRENDA: BRENDA entry
- ExPASy: NiceZyme view
- KEGG: KEGG entry
- MetaCyc: metabolic pathway
- PRIAM: profile
- PDB structures: RCSB PDB PDBe PDBsum
- Gene Ontology: AmiGO / QuickGO
Search
- PMC: articles
- PubMed: articles
- NCBI: proteins

In enzymology, a 1-acylglycerol-3-phosphate O-acyltransferase (EC 2.3.1.51) is an enzyme that catalyzes the chemical reaction

acyl-CoA + 1-acyl-sn-glycerol 3-phosphate $\rightleftharpoons$ CoA + 1,2-diacyl-sn-glycerol 3-phosphate

Thus, the two substrates of this enzyme are acyl-CoA and 1-acyl-sn-glycerol 3-phosphate, whereas its two products are CoA and 1,2-diacyl-sn-glycerol 3-phosphate.

This enzyme belongs to the family of transferases, specifically those acyltransferases transferring groups other than aminoacyl groups. The systematic name of this enzyme class is acyl-CoA:1-acyl-sn-glycerol-3-phosphate 2-O-acyltransferase. Other names in common use include 1-acyl-sn-glycero-3-phosphate acyltransferase, 1-acyl-sn-glycerol 3-phosphate acyltransferase, 1-acylglycero-3-phosphate acyltransferase, 1-acylglycerolphosphate acyltransferase, 1-acylglycerophosphate acyltransferase, and lysophosphatidic acid-acyltransferase. This enzyme participates in 3 metabolic pathways: glycerolipid metabolism, glycerophospholipid metabolism, and ether lipid metabolism.
