= Synexpression =

Synexpression is a type of non-random eukaryotic gene organization. Genes in a synexpression group may not be physically linked, but they are involved in the same process and they are coordinately expressed. It is expected that genes that function in the same process be regulated coordinately. Synexpression groups in particular represent genes that are simultaneously up- or down-regulated, often because their gene products are required in stoichiometric amounts or are protein-complex subunits. It is likely that these gene groups share common cis- and trans-acting control elements to achieve coordinate expression.

Synexpression groups are determined mainly by analysis of expression profiles compiled by the use of DNA microarrays. The use of this technology helps researchers monitor changes in expression patterns for large numbers of genes in a given experiment. Analysis of DNA microarray expression profiles has led to the discovery of a number of genes that are tightly co-regulated.

== Identification ==
The identification of synexpression groups has affected the way some scientists view evolutionary change in higher eukaryotes. Since groups of genes involved in the same biological process often share one or more common control elements, it has been suggested that the differential expression of these synexpression groups in different tissues of organisms can contribute to co-evolution tissues, organs, and appendages. Today it is commonly believed that it is not primarily the gene products themselves that evolve, but that it is the control networks for groups of genes that contribute most to the evolution of higher eukaryotes.

== Development ==
Developmental processes provide an example of how changes in synexpression control networks could significantly affect an organism's capacity to evolve and adapt effectively. In animals, it is often beneficial for appendages to co-evolve, and it has been observed that fore-and hind-limbs share expression of Hox genes early in metazoan development. Thus, changes in the regulatory patterns of these genes would affect the development of both the fore- and hind-limbs, facilitating co-evolution.

== Example ==
One simplified example of a synexpression group is the genes cdc6, cdc3, cdc46, and swi4 in yeast, which are all co-expressed early in the G-1 stage of the cell cycle., These genes share one common cis-regulatory element, called ECB, which serves as a binding site for the MCM1 trans-acting protein. Although these genes are not spatially clustered, co-regulation seems to be achieved via this common cis and trans control mechanism. Most synexpression groups are more complicated than the ECB group in yeast, involving myriad cis and trans control elements.

== See also ==
- Gene regulatory network
