= Caveolin 1 =

Protein found in humans

CAV1

Identifiers
- Aliases: CAV1, BSCL3, CGL3, LCCNS, MSTP085, PPH3, VIP21, Caveolin 1
- External IDs: OMIM: 601047; MGI: 102709; GeneCards: CAV1

Gene location (Human)
| Chr. | Chromosome 7 (human) |
| Band | 7q31.2 | Start | 116,524,994 bp |
| Band | 7q31.2 | End | 116,561,179 bp |

Gene location (Mouse)
| Chr. | Chromosome 6 (mouse) |
| Band | 6|6 A2 | Start | 17,306,334 bp |
| Band | 6|6 A2 | End | 17,341,451 bp |
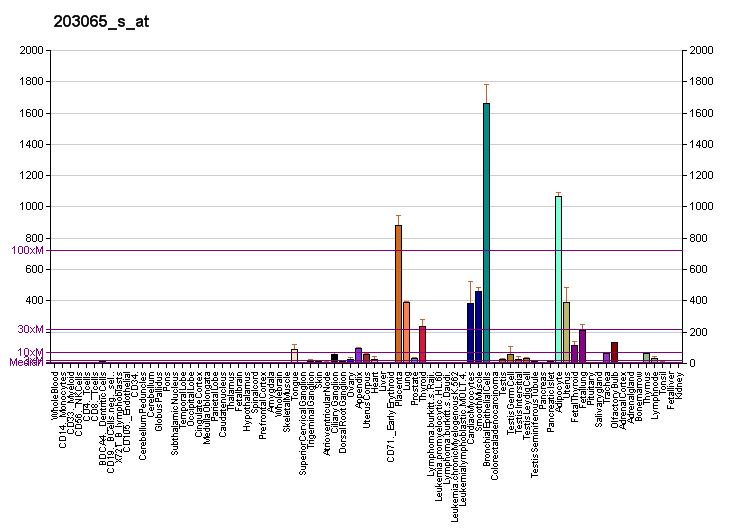

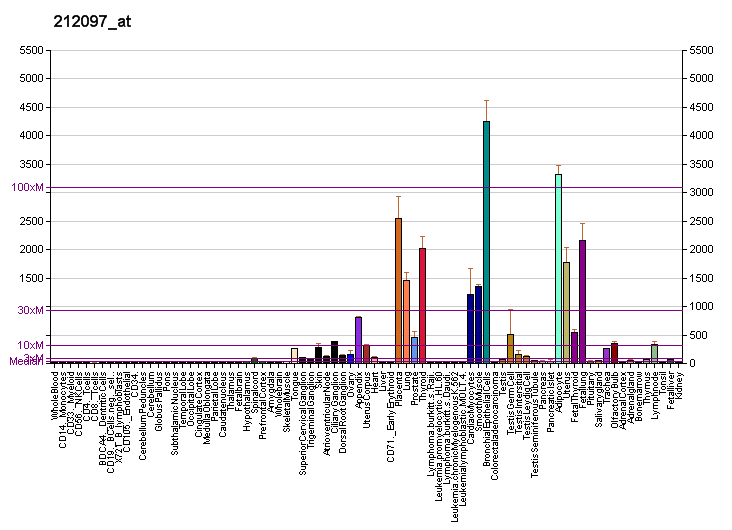
RNA expression pattern
| Bgee | Human / Mouse (ortholog); Top expressed in: lower lobe of lung; parietal pleura; skin of hip; synovial joint; visceral pleura; adipose tissue; subcutaneous adipose tissue; right lung; vena cava; Achilles tendon / Top expressed in: left lung lobe; right lung; white adipose tissue; right lung lobe; endothelial cell of lymphatic vessel; carotid body; umbilical cord; subcutaneous adipose tissue; brown adipose tissue; atrioventricular valve; More reference expression data |
| BioGPS | More reference expression data |
Gene ontology
| Molecular function | protein-macromolecule adaptor activity; transmembrane transporter binding; structural molecule activity; signaling receptor binding; nitric-oxide synthase binding; patched binding; enzyme binding; peptidase activator activity; protein binding; molecular adaptor activity; protein kinase binding; ATPase binding; cholesterol binding; inward rectifier potassium channel inhibitor activity; identical protein binding; protein heterodimerization activity; protein-containing complex binding |
| Cellular component | endocytic vesicle membrane; endosome; membrane; focal adhesion; VCP-NPL4-UFD1 AAA ATPase complex; perinuclear region of cytoplasm; caveola; cilium; apical plasma membrane; endoplasmic reticulum; membrane raft; integral component of membrane; Golgi apparatus; early endosome membrane; plasma membrane; intracellular anatomical structure; cell cortex; endoplasmic reticulum membrane; Golgi membrane; integral component of plasma membrane; acrosomal membrane; basolateral plasma membrane; cytoplasmic vesicle; lipid droplet; cytoplasm; protein-containing complex; sarcolemma |
| Biological process | caveolin-mediated endocytosis; positive regulation of calcium ion transport into cytosol; vasoconstriction; response to progesterone; negative regulation of protein binding; regulation of peptidase activity; protein localization to plasma membrane raft; mammary gland development; vasculogenesis; negative regulation of pinocytosis; response to ischemia; angiogenesis; apoptotic signaling pathway; positive regulation of extrinsic apoptotic signaling pathway; cholesterol homeostasis; triglyceride metabolic process; negative regulation of canonical Wnt signaling pathway; calcium ion transport; negative regulation of cell population proliferation; cellular response to transforming growth factor beta stimulus; positive regulation of toll-like receptor 3 signaling pathway; regulation of cytosolic calcium ion concentration; regulation of smooth muscle contraction; vesicle organization; negative regulation of peptidyl-tyrosine autophosphorylation; regulation of cardiac muscle cell action potential involved in regulation of contraction; negative regulation of transforming growth factor beta receptor signaling pathway; protein localization to basolateral plasma membrane; receptor internalization involved in canonical Wnt signaling pathway; regulation of membrane repolarization during action potential; positive regulation of peptidyl-serine phosphorylation; negative regulation of protein tyrosine kinase activity; regulation of entry of bacterium into host cell; negative regulation of MAP kinase activity; positive regulation of vasoconstriction; negative regulation of potassium ion transmembrane transport; lactation; receptor-mediated endocytosis of virus by host cell; regulation of blood coagulation; regulation of ventricular cardiac muscle cell action potential; protein homooligomerization; viral process; positive regulation of intrinsic apoptotic signaling pathway; negative regulation of receptor signaling pathway via JAK-STAT; mammary gland involution; calcium ion homeostasis; negative regulation of necroptotic process; regulation of the force of heart contraction; lipid storage; nitric oxide homeostasis; membrane depolarization; negative regulation of cytokine-mediated signaling pathway; cellular calcium ion homeostasis; negative regulation of transcription by RNA polymerase II; response to estrogen; response to calcium ion; regulation of fatty acid metabolic process; cellular response to exogenous dsRNA; negative regulation of MAPK cascade; regulation of ruffle assembly; positive regulation of protein binding; positive regulation of protein ubiquitination; negative regulation of anoikis; leukocyte migration; protein localization; positive regulation of cell adhesion molecule production; response to hypoxia; negative regulation of nitric-oxide synthase activity; response to bacterium; caveola assembly; cellular response to hyperoxia; cholesterol transport; cellular response to starvation; T cell costimulation; regulation of nitric-oxide synthase activity; receptor internalization; positive regulation of peptidase activity; positive regulation of ER-associated ubiquitin-dependent protein catabolic process; negative regulation of endothelial cell proliferation; negative regulation of BMP signaling pathway; negative regulation of protein ubiquitination; cellular response to peptide hormone stimulus; positive regulation of gene expression; negative regulation of nitric oxide biosynthetic process; angiotensin-activated signaling pathway involved in heart process; protein complex oligomerization; negative regulation of peptidyl-serine phosphorylation; posttranscriptional regulation of gene expression; positive regulation of gap junction assembly; maintenance of protein location in cell; negative regulation of signal transduction; regulation of the force of heart contraction by chemical signal; regulation of cell communication by electrical coupling involved in cardiac conduction; regulation of heart rate by cardiac conduction; negative regulation of epithelial cell differentiation; skeletal muscle tissue development; beta-catenin destruction complex disassembly; positive regulation of catalytic activity; positive regulation of canonical Wnt signaling pathway; negative regulation of tyrosine phosphorylation of STAT protein; negative regulation of inward rectifier potassium channel activity; cell differentiation; positive regulation of cell migration; positive regulation of cold-induced thermogenesis; positive regulation of NF-kappaB transcription factor activity |
Sources:Amigo / QuickGO
Orthologs
| Databases | NCBI: entry; OMA: entry |
| Species | Human | Mouse |
| Entrez | 857 | 12389 |
| Ensembl | ENSG00000105974 | ENSMUSG00000007655 |
| UniProt | Q03135 | P49817 |
| RefSeq (mRNA) | NM_001753; NM_001172895; NM_001172896; NM_001172897 | NM_001243064; NM_007616 |
| RefSeq (protein) | NP_001166366; NP_001166367; NP_001166368; NP_001744 | NP_001229993; NP_031642 |
| Location (UCSC) | Chr 7: 116.52 – 116.56 Mb | Chr 6: 17.31 – 17.34 Mb |
| PubMed search |
- Wikidata
| View/Edit Human | View/Edit Mouse |

Caveolin-1 is a protein that in humans is encoded by the CAV1 gene.

== Function ==
The scaffolding protein encoded by this gene is the main component of the caveolae plasma membranes found in most cell types. The protein links integrin subunits to the tyrosine kinase FYN, an initiating step in coupling integrins to the Ras-ERK pathway and promoting cell cycle progression. The gene is a tumor suppressor gene candidate and a negative regulator of the Ras-p42/44 MAP kinase cascade. CAV1 and CAV2 are located next to each other on chromosome 7 and express colocalizing proteins that form a stable hetero-oligomeric complex. By using alternative initiation codons in the same reading frame, two isoforms (alpha and beta) are encoded by a single transcript from this gene.

== Interactions ==
Caveolin 1 has been shown to interact with heterotrimeric G proteins, Src tyrosine kinases (Src, Lyn) and H-Ras, cholesterol, TGF beta receptor 1, endothelial NOS, androgen receptor, amyloid precursor protein, gap junction protein, alpha 1, nitric oxide synthase 2A, epidermal growth factor receptor, endothelin receptor type B, PDGFRB, PDGFRA, PTGS2, TRAF2, estrogen receptor alpha, caveolin 2, PLD2, Bruton's tyrosine kinase, and SCP2. All these interactions are through a caveolin-scaffolding domain (CSD) within caveolin-1 molecule. Molecules that interact with caveolin-1 contain caveolin-binding motifs (CBM).

== See also ==
- Caveolin
