= Caveolin 2 =

Protein found in humans

CAV2

Identifiers
- Aliases: CAV2, CAV, caveolin 2
- External IDs: OMIM: 601048; MGI: 107571; GeneCards: CAV2

Gene location (Human)
Chr.	Chromosome 7 (human)
Band	7q31.2	Start	116,287,380 bp
Band	7q31.2	End	116,508,541 bp

Gene location (Mouse)
Chr.	Chromosome 6 (mouse)
Band	6|6 A2	Start	17,281,184 bp
Band	6|6 A2	End	17,289,114 bp
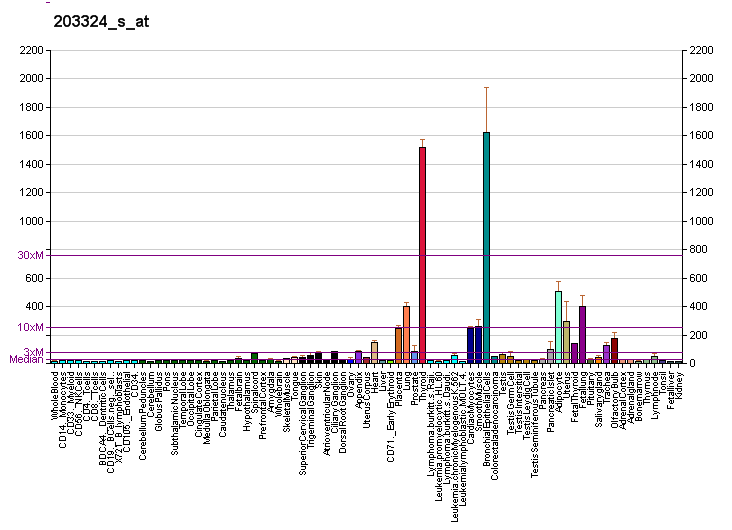

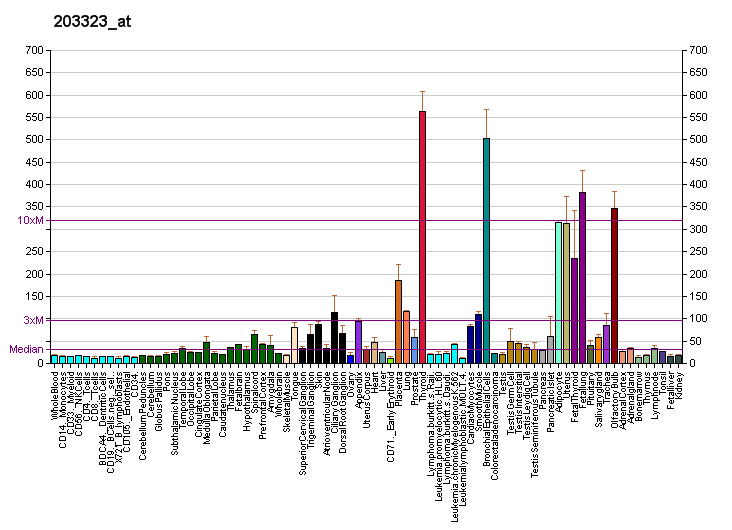
RNA expression pattern
Bgee	Human / Mouse (ortholog); Top expressed in: lower lobe of lung; right ventricle; vena cava; myocardium; urethra; synovial joint; parietal pleura; skin of hip; adipose tissue; right coronary artery / Top expressed in: left lung; left lung lobe; white adipose tissue; sciatic nerve; right lung; right lung lobe; brown adipose tissue; mammary gland; seminal vesicula; tunica adventitia of aorta; More reference expression data
BioGPS	More reference expression data
Gene ontology
Molecular function	protein-macromolecule adaptor activity; protein homodimerization activity; scaffold protein binding; protein binding; protein heterodimerization activity; molecular adaptor activity; D1 dopamine receptor binding; protein kinase binding; structural molecule activity
Cellular component	cytoplasm; Golgi apparatus; membrane; focal adhesion; extrinsic component of cytoplasmic side of plasma membrane; Golgi membrane; plasma membrane; integral component of plasma membrane; intracellular anatomical structure; transport vesicle; acrosomal membrane; perinuclear region of cytoplasm; caveola; membrane raft; cytoplasmic vesicle; nucleus; protein-containing complex; sarcolemma
Biological process	insulin receptor signaling pathway; positive regulation of endothelial cell proliferation; caveola assembly; vesicle organization; mitochondrion organization; negative regulation of transforming growth factor beta receptor signaling pathway; positive regulation of dopamine receptor signaling pathway; endoplasmic reticulum organization; negative regulation of endothelial cell proliferation; vesicle docking; positive regulation of GTPase activity; positive regulation by host of viral process; skeletal muscle fiber development; protein complex oligomerization; receptor-mediated endocytosis of virus by host cell; vesicle fusion; positive regulation of MAPK cascade; regulation of mitotic nuclear division; negative regulation of cell population proliferation; cell differentiation
Sources:Amigo / QuickGO
Orthologs
Databases	NCBI: entry; OMA: entry
Species	Human	Mouse
Entrez	858	12390
Ensembl	ENSG00000105971	ENSMUSG00000000058
UniProt	P51636	Q9WVC3
RefSeq (mRNA)	NM_001206747; NM_001206748; NM_001233; NM_198212	NM_001277756; NM_016900
RefSeq (protein)	NP_001193676; NP_001193677; NP_001224; NP_937855	NP_001264685; NP_058596
Location (UCSC)	Chr 7: 116.29 – 116.51 Mb	Chr 6: 17.28 – 17.29 Mb
PubMed search
- Wikidata
View/Edit Human	View/Edit Mouse

Caveolin-2 is a protein that in humans is encoded by the CAV2 gene.

The protein encoded by this gene is a major component of the inner surface of caveolae, small invaginations of the plasma membrane, and is involved in essential cellular functions, including signal transduction, lipid metabolism, cellular growth control and apoptosis. This protein may function as a tumor suppressor. The CAV1 and CAV2 genes are located next to each other on chromosome 7 and express colocalizing proteins that form a stable hetero-oligomeric complex, which can be disrupted by Src-mediated phosphorylation of tyrosine 19 on caveolin-2. Two transcript variants encoding distinct isoforms have been identified for this gene. By using alternative initiation codons in the same reading frame, two isoforms (alpha and beta) are encoded by one transcript.

== Interactions ==
Caveolin 2 has been shown to interact with Caveolin 1 and RAS p21 protein activator 1.
