= Caveolae =

Type of lipid raft in endocytosis

In biology, caveolae (Latin for "little caves"; singular, caveola), which are a special type of lipid raft, are small (50–100 nanometer) invaginations of the plasma membrane in the cells of many vertebrates. They are the most abundant surface feature of many vertebrate cell types, especially endothelial cells, adipocytes and embryonic notochord cells. They were originally discovered by E. Yamada in 1955.

These flask-shaped structures are rich in proteins as well as lipids such as cholesterol and sphingolipids and have several functions in signal transduction. They are also believed to play a role in mechanoprotection, mechanosensation, endocytosis, oncogenesis, and the uptake of pathogenic bacteria and certain viruses.

== Caveolins ==
Formation and maintenance of caveolae was initially thought to be primarily due to caveolin, a 21 kDa protein. There are three homologous genes of caveolin expressed in mammalian cells: Cav1, Cav2 and Cav3. These proteins have a common topology: cytoplasmic N-terminus with scaffolding domain, long hairpin transmembrane domain and cytoplasmic C-terminus. Caveolins are synthesized as monomers and transported to the Golgi apparatus. During their subsequent transport through the secretory pathway, caveolins associate with lipid rafts and form oligomers (14–16 molecules). These oligomerized caveolins form the caveolae. The presence of caveolin leads to a local change in morphology of the membrane.

== Cavins ==
Cavin proteins emerged in the late 2000s to be the main structural components controlling caveola formation. The cavin protein family consists of Cavin1 (also known as PTRF), Cavin2 (also known as SDPR), Cavin3 (also known as SRBC) and Cavin4 (also known as MURC). Cavin1 has been shown to be the main regulator of caveola formation in multiple tissues, with the sole expression of Cavin1 sufficient for morphological caveola formation in cells lacking caveolae but abundant in Cav1. Cavin4, analogous to Cav3, is muscle-specific.

== Caveolar endocytosis ==
Caveolae are one source of clathrin-independent raft-dependent endocytosis. The ability of caveolins to oligomerize due to their oligomerization domains is necessary for formation of caveolar endocytic vesicles. The oligomerization leads to formation of caveolin-rich microdomains in the plasma membrane. Increased levels of cholesterol and insertion of the scaffolding domains of caveolins into the plasma membrane leads to the expansion of the caveolar invagination and the formation of endocytic vesicles. Fission of the vesicle from the plasma membrane is then mediated by GTPase dynamin II, which is localized at the neck of the budding vesicle. The released caveolar vesicle can fuse with early endosome or caveosome. The caveosome is an endosomal compartment with neutral pH which does not have early endosomal markers. However, it contains molecules internalized by the caveolar endocytosis.

This type of endocytosis is used, for example, for transcytosis of albumin in endothelial cells or for internalization of the insulin receptor in primary adipocytes.

== Other roles of caveolae ==
- Caveolae have been shown to be required for the protection of cells from mechanical stress in multiple tissue types such as the skeletal muscles, endothelial cells and notochord cells.
- Caveolae can be used for entry to the cell by some pathogens and so they avoid degradation in lysosomes. However, some bacteria do not use typical caveolae but only caveolin-rich areas of the plasma membrane. The pathogens exploiting this endocytic pathway include viruses such as SV40 and polyoma virus and bacteria such as some strains of Escherichia coli, Pseudomonas aeruginosa and Porphyromonas gingivalis.
- Caveolae have a role in cell signaling, too. Caveolins associate with some signaling molecules (e.g. eNOS) through their scaffolding domain and so they can regulate their signaling. Caveolae are also involved in regulation of channels and in calcium signaling.
- Caveolae also participate in lipid regulation. High levels of caveolin Cav1 are expressed in adipocytes. Caveolin associates with cholesterol, fatty acids and lipid droplets and is involved in their regulation.
- Caveolae can also serve as mechanosensors in various cell types. In endothelial cells, caveolae are involved in flow sensation. Chronic exposure to the flow stimulus leads to increased levels of caveolin Cav1 in plasma membrane, its phosphorylation, activation of eNOS signaling enzyme and to remodeling of blood vessels. In smooth-muscle cells, caveolin Cav1 has a role in stretch sensing which triggers cell-cycle progression.

== Inhibitors ==
Some known inhibitors of the caveolae pathway are filipin III, genistein and nystatin.

== See also ==
- Pinocytosis
