= GPAM =

Protein-coding gene in the species Homo sapiens

Identifiers
- Aliases: GPAM, GPAT, GPAT1, glycerol-3-phosphate acyltransferase, mitochondrial
- External IDs: OMIM: 602395; MGI: 109162; HomoloGene: 7343; GeneCards: GPAM; OMA:GPAM - orthologs

Gene location (Human)
Chr.	Chromosome 10 (human)
Band	10q25.2	Start	112,149,865 bp
Band	10q25.2	End	112,215,377 bp

Gene location (Mouse)
Chr.	Chromosome 19 (mouse)
Band	19 D2|19 50.81 cM	Start	55,055,700 bp
Band	19 D2|19 50.81 cM	End	55,115,670 bp
RNA expression pattern
Bgee	Human / Mouse (ortholog); Top expressed in: pericardium; corpus epididymis; skin of hip; liver; adipose tissue; subcutaneous adipose tissue; vena cava; synovial joint; right adrenal cortex; right lobe of liver / Top expressed in: retinal pigment epithelium; ankle; brown adipose tissue; vastus lateralis muscle; temporal muscle; digastric muscle; sternocleidomastoid muscle; right ventricle; intercostal muscle; soleus muscle; More reference expression data
BioGPS	n/a
Gene ontology
Molecular function	transferase activity; O-acyltransferase activity; acyltransferase activity; glycerol-3-phosphate O-acyltransferase activity; sn-1-glycerol-3-phosphate C16:0-DCA-CoA acyl transferase activity
Cellular component	integral component of membrane; mitochondrion; membrane; mitochondrial outer membrane; plasma membrane; mitochondrial membranes
Biological process	phospholipid biosynthetic process; positive regulation of activated T cell proliferation; lipid metabolism; glycerophospholipid metabolic process; phosphatidic acid biosynthetic process; metabolism; negative regulation of activation-induced cell death of T cells; triglyceride metabolic process; acyl-CoA metabolic process; fatty acid metabolic process; CDP-diacylglycerol biosynthetic process; fatty acid homeostasis; defense response to virus; positive regulation of multicellular organism growth; response to glucose; phospholipid homeostasis; triglyceride biosynthetic process; cellular lipid metabolic process; regulation of cholesterol biosynthetic process; regulation of intracellular estrogen receptor signaling pathway; glycerol-3-phosphate metabolic process
Sources:Amigo / QuickGO
Orthologs
Species	Human	Mouse
Entrez	57678	14732
Ensembl	ENSG00000119927	ENSMUSG00000024978
UniProt	Q9HCL2	Q61586
RefSeq (mRNA)	NM_001244949; NM_020918	NM_008149; NM_001356285
RefSeq (protein)	NP_001231878; NP_065969	NP_032175; NP_001343214
Location (UCSC)	Chr 10: 112.15 – 112.22 Mb	Chr 19: 55.06 – 55.12 Mb
PubMed search
- Wikidata
View/Edit Human	View/Edit Mouse

Glycerol-3-phosphate acyltransferase 1, mitochondrial is an enzyme that in humans is encoded by the GPAM gene.

Glycerol-3-phosphate acyltransferase (GPAT; EC 2.3.1.15), which catalyzes the initial and committing step in glycerolipid biosynthesis, is predicted to play a pivotal role in the regulation of cellular triacylglycerol and phospholipid levels. Two mammalian forms of GPAT have been identified on the basis of localization to either the endoplasmic reticulum or mitochondria.[supplied by OMIM]
