= Lysophosphatidic acid =

Chemical compound

Names
- Systematic IUPAC name (2R)-2-hydroxy-3-{[(9Z)-octadec-9-enoyl]oxy}propyl dihydrogen phosphate
- Other names LPA; 1-acyl-sn-glycerol 3-phosphate

Identifiers
CAS Number	22002-87-5
3D model (JSmol)	Interactive image
ChEMBL	ChEMBL117021
ChemSpider	4593722
ECHA InfoCard	100.040.631
EC Number	244-710-0
IUPHAR/BPS	2906
MeSH	lysophosphatidic+acid
PubChem CID	5497152
UNII	PG6M3969SG
CompTox Dashboard (EPA)	DTXSID001015741 DTXSID5041061, DTXSID001015741
- InChI: InChI=1S/C21H41O7P/c1-2-3-4-5-6-7-8-9-10-11-12-13-14-15-16-17-21(23)27-18-20(22)19-28-29(24,25)26/h9-10,20,22H,2-8,11-19H2,1H3,(H2,24,25,26)/b10-9- Key: WRGQSWVCFNIUNZ-KTKRTIGZSA-N
- SMILES: CCCCCCCC\C=C/CCCCCCCC(=O)OCC(COP(=O)(O)O)O

Properties
Chemical formula	C_{21}H_{41}O_{7}P
Molar mass	436.52 g/mol
- Except where otherwise noted, data are given for materials in their standard state (at 25 °C [77 °F], 100 kPa). verify (what is ?) Infobox references

A lysophosphatidic acid (LPA) is a phospholipid derivative that can act as a signaling molecule.

== Function ==
LPA acts as a potent mitogen due to its activation of three high-affinity G-protein-coupled receptors called LPAR1, LPAR2, and LPAR3 (also known as EDG2, EDG4, and EDG7). Additional, newly identified LPA receptors include LPAR4 (P2RY9, GPR23), LPAR5 (GPR92) and LPAR6 (P2RY5, GPR87).

== Clinical significance ==
Because of its ability to stimulate cell proliferation, aberrant LPA-signaling has been linked to cancer in numerous ways. Dysregulation of autotaxin or the LPA receptors can lead to hyperproliferation, which may contribute to oncogenesis and metastasis.

LPA may cause pruritus (itching) in individuals with cholestatic (impaired bile flow) diseases.

== GTPase activation ==
Downstream of LPA receptor activation, the small GTPase Rho can be activated, subsequently activating Rho kinase. This can lead to the formation of stress fibers and cell migration by inhibiting myosin light-chain phosphatase.

== Metabolism ==
There are several potential routes to its biosynthesis, but the most well-characterized is the action of a lysophospholipase D called autotaxin, which removes the choline group from lysophosphatidylcholine.

Lysophosphatidic acids are also intermediates in the synthesis of phosphatidic acids.

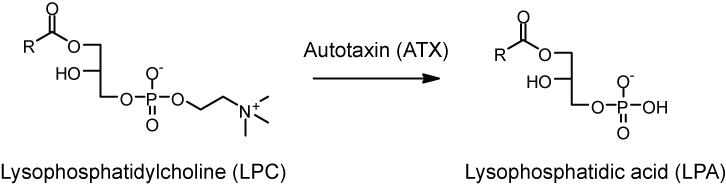

== See also ==
- Autotaxin
- GPR35
- Phosphatidic acid
- Sphingosine-1-phosphate
- Gintonin
