= Jordan Creek =

Jordan Creek may refer to:

== Streams ==
- Jordan Creek (Eel River), a stream in Indiana
- Jordan Creek (Johnson County, Iowa)
- Jordan Creek (Minnesota), a stream in Fillmore County
- Jordan Creek (Lindley Creek), a stream in Missouri
- Jordan Creek (Little Third Fork), a stream in Missouri
- Jordan Creek (Sinking Creek), a stream in Missouri
- Jordan Creek (Owyhee River), in Idaho and Oregon
- Jordan Creek (Pennsylvania), a tributary of Little Lehigh Creek
- Jordan Creek (Washington), a tributary of the Cascade River
- Jordan Creek (Georgia), a tributary of the Ocmulgee River

== Other uses ==
- Jordan Creek and Jordan Creek 2, memory buffer chips used in conjunction with Intel Xeon E7 processors
- Jordan Creek, Oregon, an unincorporated community
- Jordan Creek Town Center, a shopping center in West Des Moines, Iowa

== See also ==
- Jordan (disambiguation)
- Jordan River (disambiguation)
