= Starvation response =

Changes in metabolism that occur in response to a lack of food

Starvation response in animals (including humans) is a set of adaptive biochemical and physiological changes, triggered by lack of food or extreme weight loss, in which the body seeks to conserve energy by reducing metabolic rate and/or non-resting energy expenditure to prolong survival and preserve body fat and lean mass.

Equivalent or closely related terms include famine response, starvation mode, famine mode, starvation resistance, starvation tolerance, adapted starvation, adaptive thermogenesis, fat adaptation, and metabolic adaptation.

== In humans ==
Ordinarily, the body responds to reduced energy intake by firstly exhausting the contents of the digestive tract along with glycogen reserves present in both muscle and liver cells through glycogenolysis. After prolonged periods of starvation, this store of glycogen runs out, and the body then starts burning fat reserves and consuming muscle and other tissues. It uses the proteins within muscle tissue as a fuel source, which results in loss of muscle mass.

=== Magnitude and composition ===
The magnitude and composition of the starvation response (metabolic adaptation) was estimated in a study of 8 individuals living in isolation in Biosphere 2 for two years. During their isolation, they gradually lost an average of 15% (range: 9–24%) of their body weight due to the harsh conditions. On emerging from isolation, the eight isolated individuals were compared with a 152-person control group that initially had similar physical characteristics. On average, the starvation response of the individuals after isolation was a 750-kilojoule (180-kilocalorie) reduction in daily total energy expenditure. 250 kJ (60 kcal) of the starvation response was explained by a reduction in fat-free mass and fat mass. An additional 270 kJ (65 kcal) was explained by a reduction in fidgeting. The remaining 230 kJ (55 kcal) was statistically insignificant.

==== General ====
The energetic requirements of a body are composed of the basal metabolic rate (BMR) and the physical activity level (ERAT, exercise-related activity thermogenesis). This caloric requirement can be met with protein, fat, carbohydrates, or a mixture of those. Glucose is the general metabolic fuel, and can be metabolized by any cell. Fructose and some other nutrients can be metabolized only in the liver, where their metabolites transform into either glucose stored as glycogen in the liver and in muscles, or into fatty acids stored in adipose tissue.

Because of the blood–brain barrier, getting nutrients to the human brain is especially dependent on molecules that can pass this barrier. The brain itself consumes about 18% of the basal metabolic rate; on a total daily intake of 7,500 kJ (1,800 kcal), this equates to 1,360 kJ (324 kcal), or about 80 g of glucose. About 25% of total body glucose consumption occurs in the brain.

Glucose can be obtained directly from dietary sugars and by the breakdown of other carbohydrates. In the absence of dietary sugars and carbohydrates, glucose is obtained from the breakdown of stored glycogen. Glycogen is a readily-accessible storage form of glucose, stored in notable quantities in the liver and skeletal muscle.

When the glycogen reserve is depleted, glucose can be obtained from the breakdown of fats from adipose tissue. Fats are broken down into glycerol and free fatty acids, with the glycerol being turned into glucose in the liver through the gluconeogenesis pathway.

When even the glucose made from glycerol reserves start declining, the liver starts producing ketone bodies. Ketone bodies are short-chain derivatives of the free fatty acids mentioned in the previous paragraph, and can cross the blood–brain barrier, meaning they can be used by the brain as an alternative metabolic fuel. Fatty acids can be used directly as an energy source by most tissues in the body, but are themselves too ionized to cross the blood–brain barrier.

==== Timeline ====
After the exhaustion of the glycogen reserve, and for the next 2–3 days, fatty acids are the principal metabolic fuel. At first, the brain continues to use glucose, because if a non-brain tissue is using fatty acids as its metabolic fuel, the use of glucose in the same tissue is switched off. Thus, when fatty acids are being broken down for energy, all of the remaining glucose is made available for use by the brain.

After 2 or 3 days of fasting, the liver begins to synthesize ketone bodies from precursors obtained from fatty acid breakdown. The brain uses these ketone bodies as fuel, thus cutting its requirement for glucose. After fasting for 3 days, the brain gets 30% of its energy from ketone bodies. After 4 days, this goes up to 75%.

Thus, the production of ketone bodies cuts the brain's glucose requirement from 80 g per day to about 30 g per day. Of the remaining 30 g requirement, 20 g per day can be produced by the liver from glycerol (itself a product of fat breakdown). This still leaves a deficit of about 10 g of glucose per day that must come from some other source. This deficit is supplied via gluconeogenesis from amino acids from proteolysis of body proteins.

After several days of fasting, all cells in the body begin to break down protein. This releases amino acids into the bloodstream, which can be converted into glucose by the liver. Since much of the human body's muscle mass is protein, this phenomenon is responsible for the wasting away of muscle mass seen in starvation.

However, the body can selectively decide which cells break down protein and which do not. About 2–3 g of protein must be broken down to synthesize 1 g of glucose; about 20–30 g of protein is broken down each day to make 10 g of glucose to keep the brain alive. However, to conserve protein, this number may decrease the longer the fasting.

Starvation ensues when the fat reserves are completely exhausted and protein is the only fuel source available to the body. Thus, after periods of starvation, the loss of body protein affects the function of important organs, and death results, even if there are still fat reserves left unused. (In a leaner person, the fat reserves are depleted earlier, the protein depletion occurs sooner, and therefore death occurs sooner.)

The ultimate cause of death is, in general, cardiac arrhythmia or cardiac arrest brought on by tissue degradation and electrolyte imbalances.

In the very obese, it has been shown that proteins can be depleted first. Accordingly, death from starvation is predicted to occur before fat reserves are used up.

=== Biochemistry ===
During starvation, less than half of the energy used by the brain comes from metabolized glucose. Because the human brain can use ketone bodies as major fuel sources, the body is not forced to break down skeletal muscles at a high rate, thereby maintaining both cognitive function and mobility for up to several weeks. This response is extremely important in human evolution and allowed for humans to continue to find food effectively even in the face of prolonged starvation.

Initially, the level of insulin in circulation drops and the levels of glucagon, epinephrine and norepinephrine rise. At this time, there is an up-regulation of glycogenolysis, gluconeogenesis, lipolysis, and ketogenesis. The body's glycogen stores are consumed in about 24 hours. In a normal 70 kg adult, only about 8,000 kilojoules of glycogen are stored in the body (mostly in the striated muscles). The body also engages in gluconeogenesis to convert glycerol and glucogenic amino acids into glucose for metabolism. Another adaptation is the Cori cycle, which involves shuttling lipid-derived energy in glucose to peripheral glycolytic tissues, which in turn send the lactate back to the liver for resynthesis to glucose. Because of these processes, blood glucose levels remain relatively stable during prolonged starvation.

However, the main source of energy during prolonged starvation is derived from triglycerides. Compared to the 8,000 kilojoules of stored glycogen, lipid fuels are much richer in energy content, and an adult weighing 70 kilograms (150 lb) stores over 400,000 kilojoules of triglycerides, mostly in adipose tissue. Triglycerides are broken down to fatty acids by lipolysis. Epinephrine precipitates lipolysis by activating protein kinase A, which phosphorylates hormone sensitive lipase (HSL) and perilipin. These enzymes, along with CGI-58 and adipose triglyceride lipase (ATGL), complex at the surface of lipid droplets. The concerted action of ATGL and HSL liberates the first two fatty acids. Cellular monoacylglycerol lipase (MGL), liberates the final fatty acid. The remaining glycerol enters gluconeogenesis.

Fatty acids cannot be used as a direct fuel source. They must first undergo beta oxidation in the mitochondria, mostly those in the skeletal muscle, cardiac muscle, and liver cells. Fatty acids are transported into the mitochondria as an acyl-carnitine via the action of the enzyme CAT-1. This step controls the metabolic flux of beta oxidation. The resulting acetyl-CoA enters the TCA cycle and undergoes oxidative phosphorylation to produce ATP. The body invests some of this ATP in gluconeogenesis to produce more glucose.

Triglycerides and long-chain fatty acids are too hydrophobic to cross into brain cells, so the liver must convert them into short-chain fatty acids and ketone bodies through ketogenesis. The resulting ketone bodies, acetoacetate and β-hydroxybutyrate, are amphipathic and can be transported into the brain (and muscles) and broken down into acetyl-CoA for use in the TCA cycle. Acetoacetate breaks down spontaneously into acetone, and the acetone is released through the urine and lungs to produce the “acetone breath” that accompanies prolonged fasting. The brain also uses glucose during starvation, but most of the body's glucose is allocated to the skeletal muscles and red blood cells. The cost of the brain using too much glucose is muscle loss. If the brain and muscles relied entirely on glucose, the body would lose 50% of its nitrogen content in 8 to 10 days.

After prolonged fasting, the body begins to degrade its own skeletal muscle. To keep the brain functioning, gluconeogenesis continues to generate glucose, but glucogenic amino acids—primarily alanine—are required. These come from the skeletal muscle. Late in starvation, when blood ketone levels reach 5–7 mM, ketone use in the brain rises, while ketone use in muscles drops.

Autophagy then occurs at an accelerated rate. In autophagy, cells cannibalize critical molecules to produce amino acids for gluconeogenesis. This process distorts the structure of the cells, and a common cause of death in starvation is due to diaphragm failure from prolonged autophagy.

== In bacteria ==
Bacteria becomes highly tolerant to antibiotics when nutrients are limited. Starvation contributes to antibiotic tolerance during infection, as nutrients become limited when they are sequestered by host defenses and consumed by proliferating bacteria. One of the most important causes of starvation induced tolerance in vivo is biofilm growth, which occurs in many chronic infections. Starvation in biofilms is caused by nutrient consumption by cells located on the periphery of biofilm clusters and by reduced diffusion of substrates through the biofilm. Biofilm bacteria show extreme tolerance to almost all antibiotic classes, and supplying limiting substrates can restore sensitivity.

== See also ==
- Calorie restriction
- Compensatory growth (organism)
- Fasting § Health effects
- Fasting and longevity
- Refeeding syndrome
- Stress (biology)

== Resources ==
- Wang, Tobias; Hung, Carrie; Randall, David (2006). "The Comparative Physiology of Food Deprivation: From Feast to Famine". Annual Review of Physiology. 68 (1): 223–251. doi:10.1146/annurev.physiol.68.040104.105739. PMID 16460272.
- Henry, C.J.K (1995). "7: Influence of body composition on protein and energy requirements: some new insights". In P.S.W Davies; T.J. Cole (eds.). Body composition techniques in health and disease. Cambridge University Press. pp. 85–99. ISBN 978-0-521-46179-5.
- Dulloo, Abdul G; Jacquet, Jean (2001). "An adipose-specific control of thermogenesis in body weight regulation". International Journal of Obesity. 25: S22–S29. doi:10.1038/sj.ijo.0801907. PMID 11840210.
- Dulloo, Abdul G; Jacquet, Jean (1998). "Adaptive reduction in basal metabolic rate in response to food deprivation in humans: a role for feedback signals from fat stores" (PDF). The American Journal of Clinical Nutrition. 68 (3): 599–606. doi:10.1093/ajcn/68.3.599. PMID 9734736.
- MacDonald IA, Webber J (March 1995). "Feeding, fasting and starvation: factors affecting fuel utilization". Proc Nutr Soc. 54 (1): 267–74. doi:10.1079/pns19950053. PMID 7568259.
- Elia, M (December 2000). "Hunger disease". Clin Nutr. 19 (6): 379–86. doi:10.1054/clnu.2000.0157. PMID 11104587.
- Felig P, Marliss EB, Cahill GF (February 1971). "Metabolic response to human growth hormone during prolonged starvation". J. Clin. Invest. 50 (2): 411–21. doi:10.1172/JCI106508. PMC 291937. PMID 5540176.
- Wilson, DE; Zeikus, R; Chan, IF (Apr 1987). "Relationship of organ lipoprotein lipase activity and ketonuria to hypertriglyceridemia in starved and streptozocin-induced diabetic rats". Diabetes. 36 (4): 485–90. doi:10.2337/diabetes.36.4.485. PMID 3817303.
- Swaner, JC; Connor, WE (Aug 1975). "Hypercholesterolemia of total starvation: its mechanism via tissue mobilization of cholesterol". The American Journal of Physiology. 229 (2): 365–9. doi:10.1152/ajplegacy.1975.229.2.365. PMID 169705.
