= Jordan (disambiguation) =

Jordan is a landlocked country in West Asia.

Jordan or Jordán may also refer to:

== People and fictional characters ==
- Jordan (given name), including a list of people and fictional characters
- Jordan (surname), including a list of people and fictional characters
- Jordan (footballer, born 1932) (1932–2012), Brazilian football defender Jordan da Costa
- Jordan (footballer, born 1998), Brazilian football goalkeeper Jordan Esteves da Costa Daniel
- Jordan (footballer, born 1999), Brazilian football centre-back Anderson Jordan da Silva Cordeiro
- Katie Price (born 1978), British glamour model known as Jordan
- Pamela Rooke (1955–2022), English model and actress also known as Jordan

== Businesses ==
- Jordan Grand Prix, an Irish Formula One constructor
- Jordan Motor Car Company, an automobile manufacturer of the 1920s
- The Jordan Company, an American private equity firm
- Jordan (dental company), a Norwegian manufacturer of toothbrushes and cleaning supplies

== Music ==
- "Jordan" (Buckethead composition)
- "Jordan", a 2006 song by Bellowhead from Burlesque
- "Jordan", a hymn tune by William Billings
- "Jordan", a 1998 song by Megaherz from Kopfschuss

== Places ==
=== United States ===
- Jordan, Owen County, Indiana, an unincorporated community
- Jordan, Iowa, an unincorporated community
- Jordan, Kentucky, an unincorporated community
- Jordan, Minnesota, a city
- Jordan, Minneapolis, a neighborhood of Minneapolis, Minnesota
- Jordan, Missouri, an unincorporated community
- Jordan, Montana, a town
- Jordan, New York, a village
- Jordan, North Carolina, an unincorporated community
- Jordan, Oregon, an unincorporated community
- Jordan, Wisconsin, a town
- Jordan, Portage County, Wisconsin, an unincorporated community
- Jordan Township (disambiguation)
- Jordan Creek (disambiguation)

=== Elsewhere ===
- Jordan River (disambiguation)
  - Jordan River, a river in the Middle East
- Jordan Valley, in the West Bank of Palestine
- Jordan, Ontario, Canada, a community
- Jordán Reservoir, Tábor, Czech Republic
- Jordan, Hong Kong, an area
  - Jordan station, a Mass Transit Railway station
- Nelson Mandela Boulevard (Jordan Street) Tehran, Iran, a district and street
- Jordan, Guimaras, Philippines, a 3rd class municipality
- Jordan (Neumark), Poland, a village

== Schools ==
- University of Jordan, Amman, Jordan, a public university
- Jordan College (disambiguation)
- Jordan High School (disambiguation)

== Other uses ==
- Chamber pot or Jordan
- R v Jordan (2016), informally "Jordan", a court case in Canada

== See also ==
- Air Jordan, a nickname for Michael Jordan and the brand name of his athletic wear
- JRDN (born 1978), Canadian musician
- Giordano (surname)
- Jordaan, a district of the city of Amsterdam in The Netherlands
- Jordans (disambiguation)
- Jordanus (disambiguation)
- Jourdain (disambiguation)
