= CLCC1 =

Protein-coding gene in humans

Identifiers
- Aliases: CLCC1, MCLC, chloride channel CLIC like 1
- External IDs: OMIM: 617539; MGI: 2385186; GeneCards: CLCC1

Gene location (Human)
Chr.	Chromosome 1 (human)
Band	1p13.3	Start	108,929,508 bp
Band	1p13.3	End	108,963,457 bp

Gene location (Mouse)
Chr.	Chromosome 3 (mouse)
Band	3|3 F3	Start	108,561,229 bp
Band	3|3 F3	End	108,586,156 bp
RNA expression pattern
Bgee	Human / Mouse (ortholog); Top expressed in: tendon of biceps brachii; buccal mucosa cell; Achilles tendon; internal globus pallidus; stromal cell of endometrium; body of pancreas; islet of Langerhans; gastrocnemius muscle; epithelium of colon; corpus callosum / Top expressed in: spermatocyte; seminal vesicula; intercostal muscle; primary oocyte; right kidney; parotid gland; lobe of cerebellum; median eminence; Gonadal ridge; muscle of thigh; More reference expression data
BioGPS	n/a
Gene ontology
Molecular function	chloride channel activity
Cellular component	integral component of membrane; Golgi apparatus; endoplasmic reticulum; membrane; nucleus; chloride channel complex; intracellular membrane-bounded organelle
Biological process	chloride transport; chloride transmembrane transport; ion transport; transport
Sources:Amigo / QuickGO
Orthologs
Databases	NCBI: entry; OMA: entry
Species	Human	Mouse
Entrez	23155	229725
Ensembl	ENSG00000121940	ENSMUSG00000027884
UniProt	Q96S66	Q99LI2
RefSeq (mRNA)	NM_015127; NM_001048210; NM_001278202; NM_001278203	NM_001177770; NM_001177771; NM_145543; NM_001355632
RefSeq (protein)	NP_001041675; NP_001265131; NP_001265132; NP_055942; NP_001364387 NP_001364388; NP_001364389; NP_001364390; NP_001364391; NP_001364392; NP_001364393; NP_001364394; NP_001364395; NP_001364396; NP_001364397; NP_001364398; NP_001364399	NP_001171241; NP_001171242; NP_663518; NP_001342561
Location (UCSC)	Chr 1: 108.93 – 108.96 Mb	Chr 3: 108.56 – 108.59 Mb
PubMed search
- Wikidata
View/Edit Human	View/Edit Mouse

Chloride channel CLIC-like 1, also known as CLCC1, is a human gene. This protein is vital in the regulation, storage and secretion of lipids and the assembly of nuclear pore complexes (NOCs). It may also be a chloride channel however evidence for this is inconclusive.

It is related in sequence to the MID-1 stretch-activated channel of Saccharomyces cerevisiae. It clusters with lipolysis regulator genes such as ABHD5 and PNPLA2.

== Tissue distribution ==
CLCC1 is located in the membranes of intracellular compartments including endoplasmic reticulum and the Golgi apparatus. It is highly expressed in the testis and moderately in the spleen, liver, kidney, heart, brain, and lung.

== Function ==
CLCC1 has various functions but is vital in two main functions in hepatic cells and nuclear pore complexes (NPCs). In hepatocytes, this protein is a critical regulator of neutral lipid storage and secretion. It mediates membrane fusion which promotes hepatic neutral lipid flux and the assembly of the nuclear pore complex.

=== Lipid regulation ===
CLCC1 regulates in lipid homeostasis by regulating the storage and secretion of lipids. It is able to recognize an imbalance in lipids by partnering with TMEM41B. When an imbalance is recognized, lipid scrambling is then promoted. They also support the biogenesis and bulk transport of lipoproteins (LPs).

=== NPC assembly ===
CLCC1 seems to be an essential component in the assembly of the nuclear pore complex in hepatic cells. Disruptions in similar proteins (BRL1 and BRR6) has caused nuclear membrane herniations (nuclear blebs) often being from disruptions in NPC insertion. Because of the similar structure of CLCC1 has to BRL1 and BRR6, it would likely have a similar effect. (Mathiowetz et al. 2026) knocked-out CLCC1 genes from mice cells which resulted in loss of NPCs. This led to a reduction in transportation between the nucleus and cytoplasm.

=== Channel protein ===
The protein encoded by this gene is potentially a chloride channel. However, there is no conclusive evidence for this and there seems to be no overall sequence similarity with known protein channel families.

=== Loss of CLCC1 ===
The loss of CLCC1 leads to a buildup of large lipid droplets (LDs) in hepatoma cells. It also leads to the accumulation of herniations in the nuclear membrane which is accompanied by a reduction in number of nuclear pores. This gene was subjected to knock-out tests on mice. When knocked-out, it causes stress to the endoplasmic reticulum (ER) and neurodegeneration. The loss of this gene also causes liver steatosis.
