= Jordan Township =

Jordan Township may refer to:

== Illinois ==
- Jordan Township, Whiteside County, Illinois

== Indiana ==
- Jordan Township, Jasper County, Indiana
- Jordan Township, Warren County, Indiana

== Iowa ==
- Jordan Township, Monona County, Iowa

== Michigan ==
- Jordan Township, Michigan

== Minnesota ==
- Jordan Township, Fillmore County, Minnesota

== Missouri ==
- Jordan Township, Hickory County, Missouri
- Jordan Township, Ripley County, Missouri

== Pennsylvania ==
- Jordan Township, Clearfield County, Pennsylvania
- Jordan Township, Lycoming County, Pennsylvania
- Jordan Township, Northumberland County, Pennsylvania

== South Dakota ==
- Jordan Township, Tripp County, South Dakota, in Tripp County, South Dakota
