= Jordans =

Jordans may refer to:

== Communities ==
- Jordans, Buckinghamshire, a village in England
- Friendship, Wake County, North Carolina, an unincorporated community formerly known as Jordans
- Pipestem, West Virginia, an unincorporated community in Summers County also known as Jordans Chapel

== Other uses ==
- Air Jordan, a brand of Nike shoes sponsored by American basketball player Michael Jordan
- Jordans' anomaly, a familial abnormality of white blood cell morphology
- Jordans Mine, on the Isle of Portland in Dorset, England
- Jordanshöhe, a mountain in central Germany

== See also ==
- Jordan (disambiguation)
