= Jordans' anomaly =

Persistent vacuolation of white blood cells

- Other names: Jordan anomaly, Jordans bodies
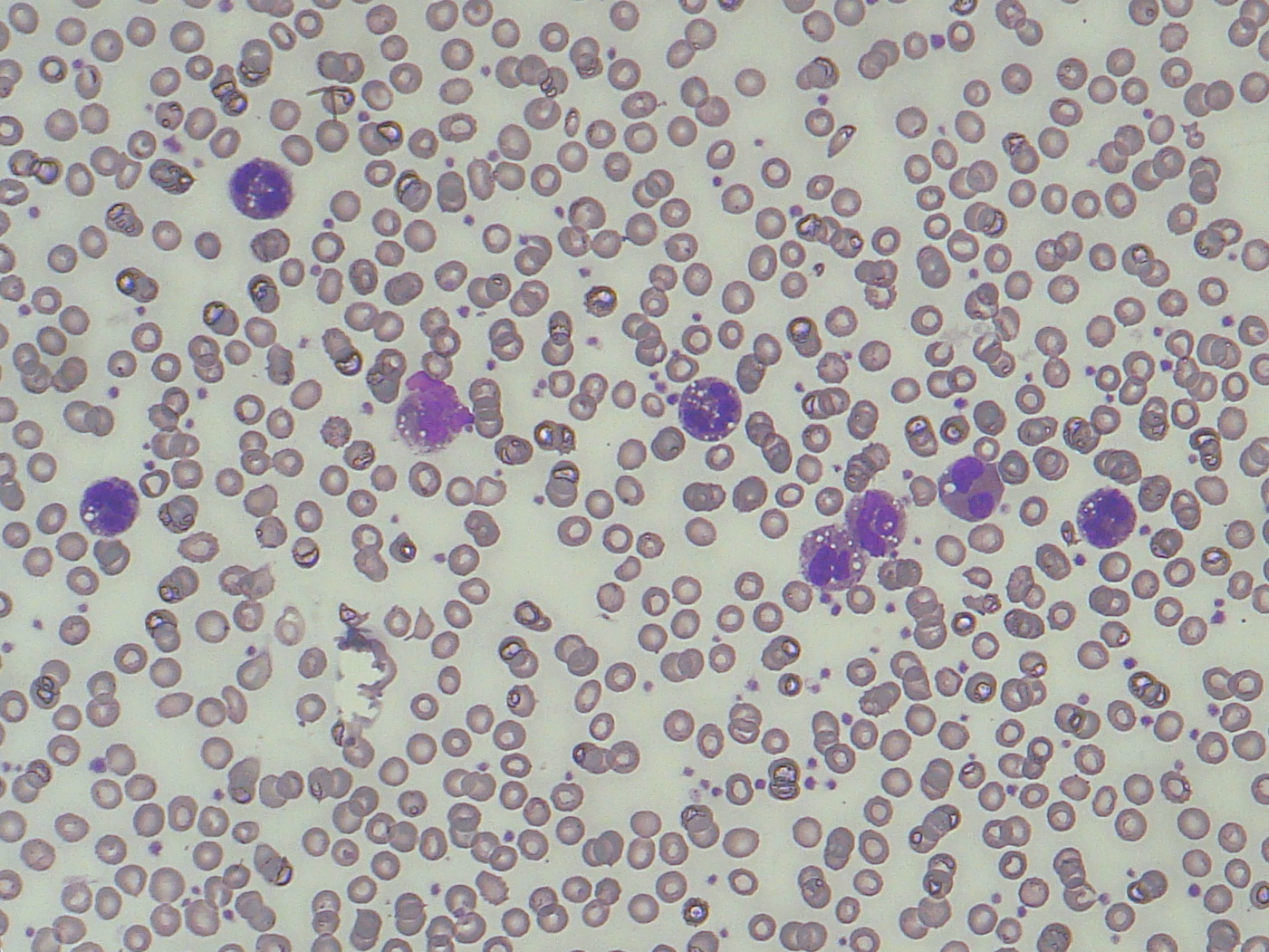
- Jordans' anomaly in Chanarin-Dorfman syndrome
- Specialty: Hematology
- Symptoms: Persistent vacuolation of white blood cells
- Diagnostic method: Blood smear examination

Jordans' anomaly (also known as Jordan anomaly and Jordans bodies) is a familial abnormality of white blood cell morphology. Individuals with this condition exhibit persistent vacuolation of granulocytes and monocytes in the peripheral blood and bone marrow. Jordans' anomaly is associated with neutral lipid storage diseases.

== Genetics ==
Jordans' anomaly is a characteristic finding in Chanarin-Dorfman syndrome and other neutral lipid storage diseases. The anomaly is associated with mutations in the PNPLA2 gene, which produces the enzyme adipose triglyceride lipase (ATGL), and the ABHD5 gene, which encodes a cofactor of ATGL. These mutations lead to defective triglyceride breakdown and accumulation of lipid droplets in cells throughout the body.

== Histopathology ==
The vacuoles of Jordans' anomaly contain neutral lipids that stain positive with Sudan staining techniques.

== History ==
The anomaly was first described in 1953, by Dr. G. H. Jordans, who identified abnormal vacuolation in the white blood cells of two brothers with congenital muscular dystrophy. Using special staining, Jordans demonstrated that the vacuoles contained lipids. In 1966, two further cases of persistent lipid vacuoles were reported in sisters presenting with ichthyosis. The Chanarin-Dorfman syndrome, comprising Jordans' anomaly, ichthyosis and lipid storage abnormalities, was defined in the 1970s, definitively connecting Jordans' anomaly to lipid storage disease. Jordans' anomaly was linked to genetic mutations affecting triglyceride metabolism in 2006.
