= Jordan Township, Pennsylvania =

Jordan Township is the name of some places in the U.S. state of Pennsylvania:

- Jordan Township, Clearfield County, Pennsylvania
- Jordan Township, Lycoming County, Pennsylvania
- Jordan Township, Northumberland County, Pennsylvania
