= Hilpda =

HILPDA

Identifiers
- Aliases: HILPDA, C7orf68, HIG-2, HIG2, hypoxia inducible lipid droplet associated
- External IDs: OMIM: 617905; MGI: 1916823; GeneCards: HILPDA

Gene location (Mouse)
Chr.	Chromosome 6 (mouse)
Band	6|6 A3.3	Start	29,272,487 bp
Band	6|6 A3.3	End	29,275,445 bp
RNA expression pattern
Bgee	Human / Mouse (ortholog); Top expressed in: vena cava; pericardium; saphenous vein; nipple; oocyte; adipose tissue; subcutaneous adipose tissue; internal globus pallidus; trachea; vulva / Top expressed in: right lung lobe; decidua; embryo; lip; left lung; gastrula; spermatocyte; embryo; blastocyst; transitional epithelium of urinary bladder; More reference expression data
BioGPS	n/a
Gene ontology
Molecular function	signaling receptor binding; protein binding
Cellular component	integral component of membrane; extracellular region; cell surface; lipid droplet; secretory granule; membrane; extracellular space; nucleoplasm; cytosol
Biological process	positive regulation of lipid storage; autocrine signaling; positive regulation of cytokine production; positive regulation of cell population proliferation; lipid droplet organization; cellular response to hypoxia
Sources:Amigo / QuickGO
Orthologs
Databases	NCBI: entry
Species	Human	Mouse
Entrez	29923	69573
Ensembl	n/a	ENSMUSG00000043421
UniProt	Q9Y5L2	Q9JLS0
RefSeq (mRNA)	NM_013332; NM_001098786	NM_001190461; NM_023516
RefSeq (protein)	NP_001092256; NP_037464	NP_001177390; NP_076005
Location (UCSC)	n/a	Chr 6: 29.27 – 29.28 Mb
PubMed search
- Wikidata
View/Edit Human	View/Edit Mouse

Hypoxia inducible lipid droplet-associated (Hilpda, also known as C7orf68 and HIG-2) is a protein that in humans is encoded by the HILPDA gene.

== Discovery ==
HILPDA was originally discovered in a screen to identify new genes that are activated by low oxygen pressure (hypoxia) in human cervical cancer cells. The protein consists of 63 amino acids in humans and 64 amino acids in mice.

== Expression ==
HILPDA is produced by numerous cells and tissues, including cancer cells, immune cells, fat cells, and liver cells. Low oxygen pressure (hypoxia), fatty acids, and beta-adrenergic agonists stimulate HILPDA expression.

== Function ==
Nearly all cells have the ability to store excess energy as fat in special structures in the cell called lipid droplets. The formation and breakdown of lipid droplets is controlled by various enzymes and lipid droplet-associated proteins. One of the lipid droplet-associated proteins is HILPDA. HILPDA acts as a regulatory signal that blocks the breakdown of the fat stores in cells when the external fat supply is high or the availability of oxygen is low. In cells, HILPDA is located in the endoplasmic reticulum and around lipid droplets. Gain and loss-of-function studies have shown that HILPDA promotes fat storage in cancer cells, macrophages and liver cells. This effect is at least partly achieved by suppressing triglyceride breakdown by inhibiting the enzyme adipose triglyceride lipase. The binding of HILPDA to adipose triglyceride lipase occurs via the conserved N-terminal portion of HILPDA, which is similar to a region in the G0S2 protein.

== Clinical significance ==
The deficiency of HILPDA in mice that are prone to develop atherosclerosis led to a reduction in atherosclerotic plaques, suggesting that HILPDA may be a potential therapeutic target for atherosclerosis. In addition, HILPDA may be targeted for the treatment of non-alcoholic fatty liver disease.
