= Jordan Creek (Sinking Creek tributary) =

Stream in the US state of Missouri

Jordan Creek is a stream in southeastern Dade County, Missouri. It is a tributary of Sinking Creek.

The stream source is at 37°18′21″N 93°42′01″W and its confluence with Sinking Creek is at 37°20′43″N 93°45′20″W. The short stream starts just east of Missouri Route M south of Everton flows west and then northwest past Missouri Route K to its confluence with Sinking Creek west of Everton.

Jordan Creek was named after the Jordan River in southwest Asia.

== See also ==
- List of rivers of Missouri
