= Famine response =

Famine response can refer to:

- Famine relief, the societal response to famine
- Starvation response, the physiological and biochemical response to starvation
