= Jordão River =

Jordão River may refer to:

== Brazil ==
- Jordão River (Acre)
- Jordão River (Paraná)

== See also ==
- Jordão (disambiguation)
- Jordan River (disambiguation)
