= Jordan River (disambiguation) =

The Jordan River is a river in the Middle East draining into the Dead Sea.

Jordan River or River Jordan or River of Jordan may also refer to:

== Rivers ==
=== Australia ===
- Jordan River (Tasmania)
- Jordan River (Victoria)

=== Canada ===
- Jordan River, British Columbia, or River Jordan, a settlement on Vancouver Island
- Jordan River system of the Tobeatic Game Reserve, Nova Scotia

=== New Zealand ===
- Jordan River (New Zealand), the name of two rivers

=== United Kingdom ===
- River Jordan, a tributary of the River Valency in Cornwall
- River Jordan, Dorset
- River Jordan, Liverpool
- River Jordan, Northamptonshire

=== United States ===
- River Jordan, the original name of the East Bay River, Navarre, Florida
- Jordan River, a section of Clear Creek (Salt Creek), Indiana
- Jordan River (Maine)
- Jordan River (Beaver Island), Michigan
- Jordan River (Michigan)
- Jourdan River, in Mississippi
- River Jordan, a name given to the Ohio River by escaping slaves
- Jordan River (Utah)
- Jordan River (Virginia)

== Songs ==
- "River Jordan", by Clancy Eccles, 1960
- "River Jordan", by Sugar Minott from Black Roots, 1979
- "River Jordan", by Vusi Mahlasela from Guiding Star (2007 album)
- "River Jordan", from The Civil War (musical)
- "River Jordan", by Janis Joplin, from Janis (1975 album)
- "River Jordan", by The Felice Brothers from Celebration, Florida (album), 2011
- "River Jordan", by Prince Far I from Livity, 1981
- "River of Jordan", by Lecrae from the soundtrack of The Shack (2017 film)
- "River of Jordan", by Reno and Smiley, 1967
- "River of Jordan", from Sunshine (Jeff & Sheri Easter album), 2004
- "River of Jordan", a single by Carter Family
- "River of Jordan", from Satan Is Real by The Louvin Brothers, 1959

== People ==
- Jordan River (director), Italian film director, screenwriter and producer

== See also ==
- Jordan (disambiguation)
- Jordan Creek (disambiguation)
- Jordão River (disambiguation)
- Yardna (Mandaic word for "Jordan")
