= Jordan College =

Jordan College may refer to:

- Jordan College, Oxford, a fictional college in the His Dark Materials book trilogy and related works
- Jordan College of Fine Arts at Butler University
- Jordan College (Michigan), a now defunct institution
- Jordan University College of the St. Augustine University of Tanzania

== See also ==
- Jordan High School (disambiguation)
