= Lipolysis =

Metabolism involving breakdown of lipids

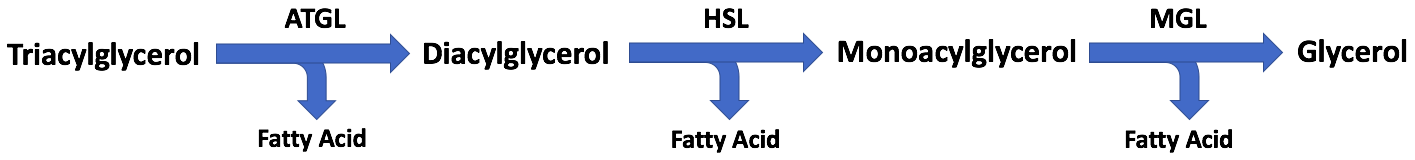
This image illustrates the three separate steps of hydrolysis involved in lipolysis. In the first step, triacylglycerol is hydrolyzed to make diacylglycerol and this is catalyzed by adipose triglyceride lipase (ATGL). In the second step, diacylglycerol is hydrolyzed to make monoacylglycerol and this is catalyzed by hormone-sensitive lipase (HSL). In the last step, monoacylglycerol is hydrolyzed to make glycerol and this is catalyzed by monoacylglycerol lipase (MGL).

Example of a triacylglycerol

Lipolysis /lɪˈpɒlɪsɪs/ is the metabolic pathway through which lipid triglycerides are hydrolyzed into a glycerol and free fatty acids. It is used to mobilize stored energy during fasting or exercise, and usually occurs in fat adipocytes. Fat storage in the body is through adipose tryglicerides and is utilized for heat, energy, and insulation.

== Mechanisms ==
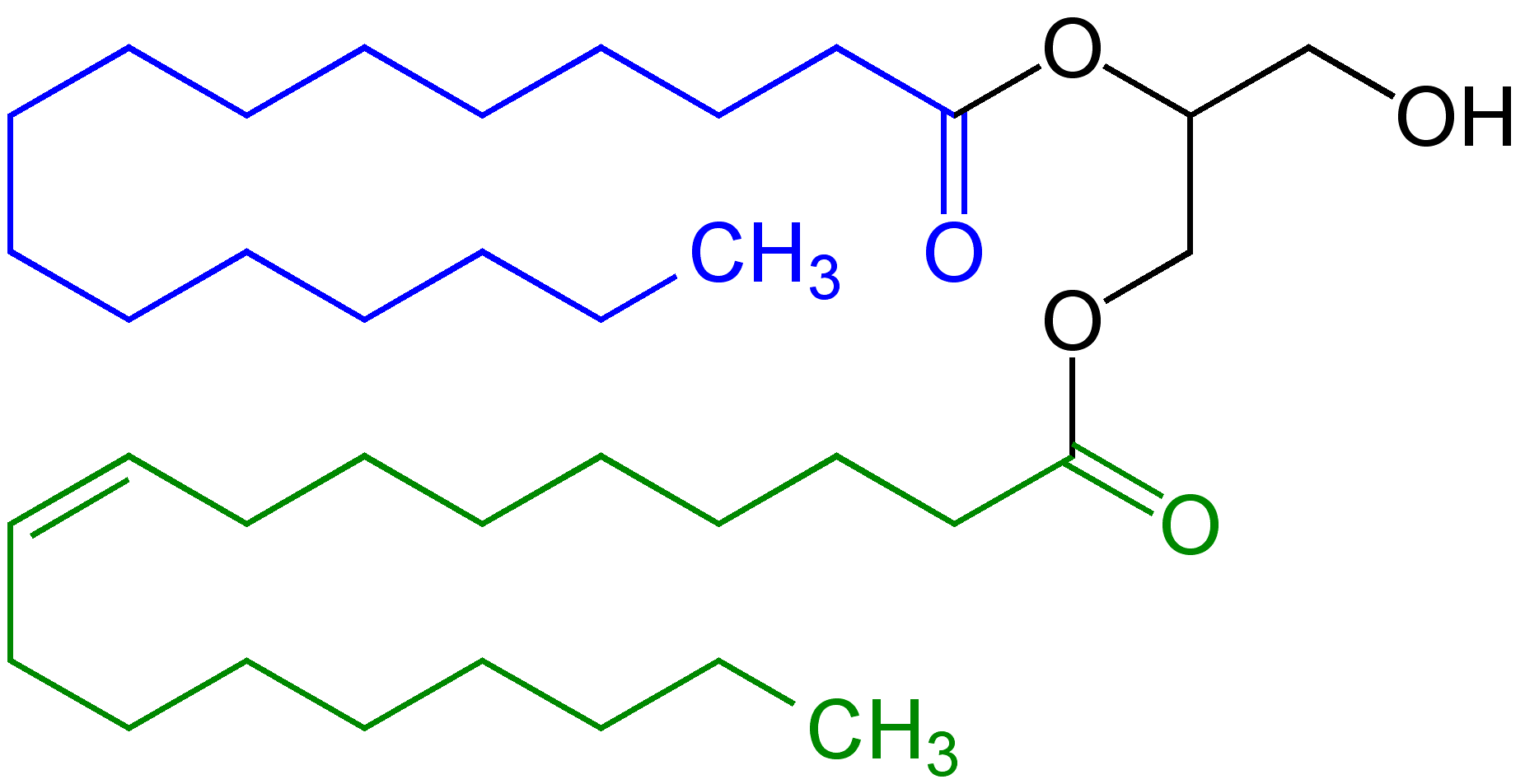
Example of a diacylglycerol

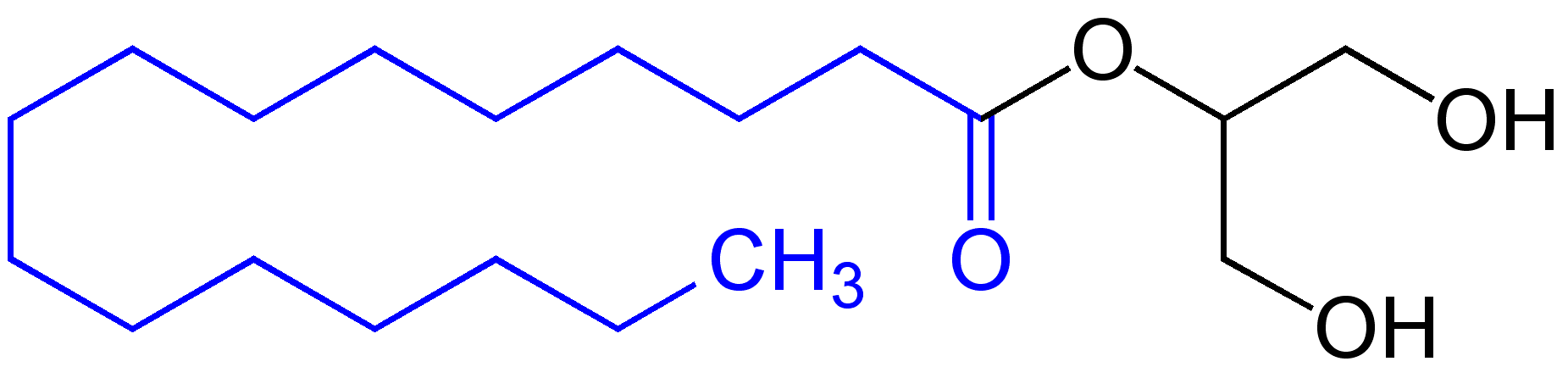
Example of a monoacylglycerol

In the body, stores of fat are referred to as adipose tissue. In these areas, intracellular triglycerides are stored in cytoplasmic lipid droplets. When lipase enzymes are phosphorylated, they can access lipid droplets and through multiple steps of hydrolysis, breakdown triglycerides into fatty acids and glycerol. Each step of hydrolysis leads to the removal of one fatty acid. The first step and the rate-limiting step of lipolysis is carried out by adipose triglyceride lipase (ATGL). This enzyme catalyzes the hydrolysis of triacylglycerol to diacylglycerol. Subsequently, hormone-sensitive lipase (HSL) catalyzes the hydrolysis of diacylglycerol to monoacylglycerol and monoacylglycerol lipase (MGL) catalyzes the hydrolysis of monoacylglycerol to glycerol.

Perilipins are proteins that act as a physical shield or dynamic scaffold, preventing lipolytic enzymes in the cytosol from accessing the stored triglycerides during periods of energy abundance.

Perilipin 1A is a key protein regulator of lipolysis in adipose tissue. This lipid droplet-associated protein, when deactivated, will prevent the interaction of lipases with triglycerides in the lipid droplet and grasp the ATGL co-activator, comparative gene identification 58 (CGI-58) (a.k.a. ABHD5). When perilipin 1A is phosphorylated by PKA, it releases CGI-58 and it expedites the docking of phosphorylated lipases to the lipid droplet. CGI-58 can be further phosphorylated by PKA to assist in its dispersal to the cytoplasm. In the cytoplasm, CGI-58 can co-activate ATGL. ATGL activity is also impacted by the negative regulator of lipolysis, G0/G1 switch gene 2 (G0S2). When expressed, G0S2 acts as a competitive inhibitor in the binding of CGI-58. Fat-specific protein 27 (FSP-27) (a.k.a. CIDEC) is also a negative regulator of lipolysis. FSP-27 expression is negatively correlated with ATGL mRNA levels.

== Regulation ==
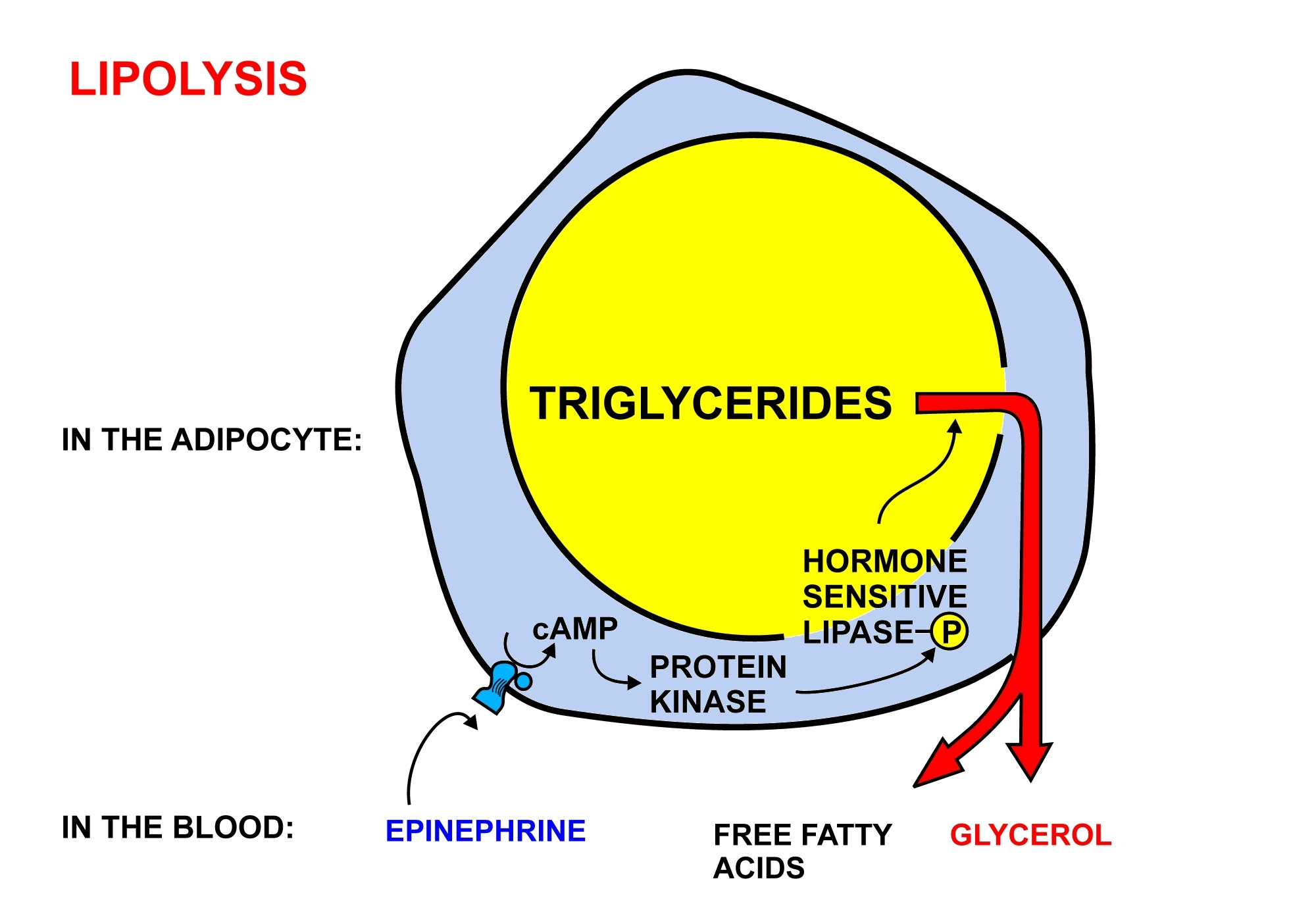
Illustration of the activation of lipolysis in an adipocyte. Induced by high epinephrine and low insulin levels in the blood, epinephrine binds to beta-adrenergic receptors on the cell membrane of the adipocyte, which causes cAMP to be generated inside the cell. The cAMP activates protein kinases, which phosphorylate and thus activate hormone-sensitive lipases in the adipocyte. These lipases cleave free fatty acids from their attachment to glycerol in the lipid droplet of the adipocyte. The free fatty acids and glycerol are then released into the blood. The activity of hormone sensitive lipase is regulated by the circulating hormones insulin, glucagon, epinephrine, norepinephrine, growth hormone, atrial natriuretic peptide, brain natriuretic peptide, and cortisol.

Lipolysis can be regulated through cAMP's binding and activation of protein kinase A (PKA). PKA can phosphorylate lipases, perilipin 1A, and CGI-58 to increase the rate of lipolysis. Catecholamines bind to 7TM receptors (G protein-coupled receptors) on the adipocyte cell membrane, which activate adenylate cyclase. This results in increased production of cAMP, which activates PKA and leads to an increased rate of lipolysis. Despite glucagon's lipolytic activity (which stimulates PKA as well) in vitro, the role of glucagon in lipolysis in vivo is disputed.

Insulin counter-regulates this increase in lipolysis when it binds to insulin receptors on the adipocyte cell membrane. Insulin receptors activate insulin-like receptor substrates. These substrates activate phosphoinositide 3-kinases (PI-3K) which then phosphorylate protein kinase B (PKB) (a.k.a. Akt). PKB subsequently phosphorylates phosphodiesterase 3B (PD3B), which then converts the cAMP produced by adenylate cyclase into 5'AMP. The resulting insulin induced reduction in cAMP levels decreases the lipolysis rate.

Insulin also acts in the brain at the mediobasal hypothalamus. There, it suppresses lipolysis and decreases sympathetic nervous outflow to the fatty part of the brain matter. The regulation of this process involves interactions between insulin receptors and gangliosides present in the neuronal cell membrane.

The rate of lipolysis varies between adipose tissue depots due to differences in adrenergic receptor expression. Beta-adrenergic receptors (β_{1}, β_{2}, β_{3}) stimulate lipolysis through G_{s}-protein-coupled activation of adenylyl cyclase and subsequent cAMP production, while alpha-2 adrenergic receptors (α_{2A}) inhibit lipolysis through G_{i}-protein-mediated suppression of adenylyl cyclase. Subcutaneous abdominal adipose tissue exhibits a higher α_{2}:β ratio compared to visceral adipose tissue, which is predominantly β_{3}-receptor-expressing and more lipolytically responsive to catecholamine stimulation.

== In blood ==
Triglycerides are transported through the blood to appropriate tissues (adipose, muscle, etc.) by lipoproteins such as Very-Low-Density-Lipoproteins (VLDL). Triglycerides present on the VLDL undergo lipolysis by the cellular lipases of target tissues, which yields glycerol and free fatty acids. Free fatty acids released into the blood are then available for cellular uptake. Free fatty acids not immediately taken up by cells may bind to albumin for transport to surrounding tissues that require energy. Serum albumin is the major carrier of free fatty acids in the blood.

The glycerol also enters the bloodstream and is absorbed by the liver or kidney where it is converted to glycerol 3-phosphate by the enzyme glycerol kinase. Hepatic glycerol 3-phosphate is converted mostly into dihydroxyacetonephosphate (DHAP) and then glyceraldehyde 3-phosphate (GA3P) to rejoin the glycolysis and gluconeogenesis pathway.

== Medical procedures ==
Physical lipolysis involves destruction of fat cells containing the fat droplets and can be used as part of cosmetic body contouring procedures. Currently there are four main non-invasive body contouring techniques in aesthetic medicine for reducing localized subcutaneous adipose tissue in addition to the standard minimally invasive liposuction: low-level laser therapy (LLLT), cryolipolysis, radio frequency (RF) and high-intensity focused ultrasound (HIFU). However, they are less effective with shorter lasting benefits and can remove significantly smaller amounts of fat compared to traditional surgical liposuction or lipectomy. However, future drug developments can be potentially combined with smaller procedures to augment the result.
