= Jordan Creek (Eel River tributary) =

Stream in Clay and Owen County, Indiana, U.S.

Coordinates: 39°23′10″N 87°01′05″W

Jordan Creek is a stream in Clay and Owen counties, in the U.S. state of Indiana. It is a tributary of the Eel River.

The stream was named after the Jordan River in West Asia.

== See also ==
- List of rivers of Indiana
