= Jordans Mine =

Coordinates: 50°32′53″N 2°26′28″W

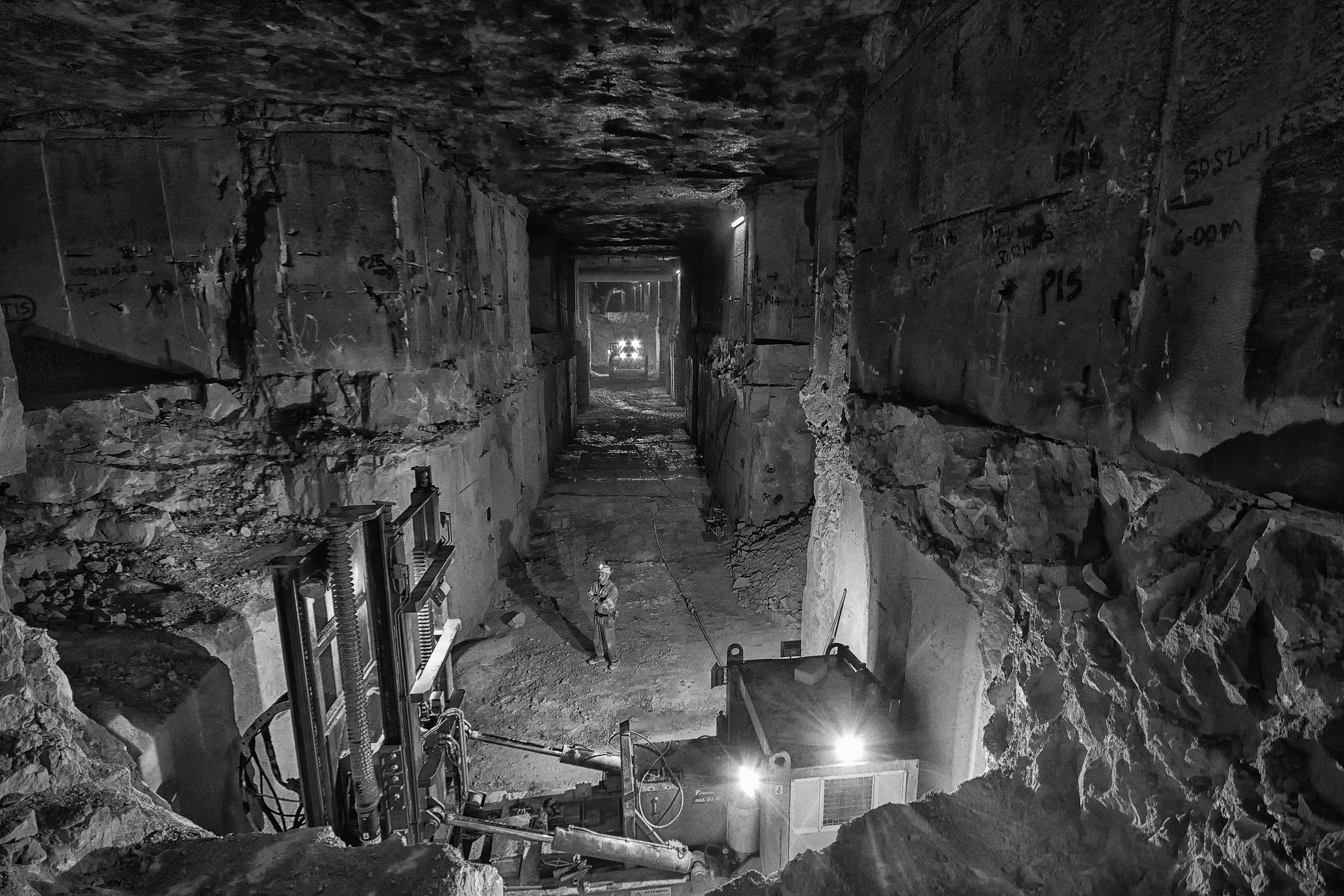
Jordans Mine

Jordans Mine is a Portland Stone mine on the Isle of Portland in Dorset, England. In 2016 it was the biggest mine for this stone, at some places 9 m (30 ft) high. It had previously been a quarry site since the 19th century. Following the successful planning application and the signing of the Unilateral Undertaking the mining began in 2008 and became 100% mining in early 2016. There are several miles of tunnels and this network dramatically reduces the impact on the environment and local residence

Mining minimises the impact on the conservation area and on the listed buildings. The access road is situated within an existing quarry and landscape and away from the sensitive properties so as not to affect the settings of the listed buildings or the conservation area. The Portal location is in the base of the existing quarry so it would not be visible other than by looking over the quarry edge.

Jordans Mine produces Jordans Basebed, Jordans Whitbed, Fancy Beach Whitbed, Grove Whitbed, Jordans Roach, Ostrea Patch Reef Whitbed and is also part of Inmosthay Quarry which is in the centre of the Isle of Portland.

Albion Stone holds open days to the local residence once a year. Visitors are taken around the mine by the mine manager to view the operations that take place over 20 m (70 ft) below Portland.
