= Jordan High School =

Jordan High School may refer to one of the following in the United States:

== Alabama ==
- Mortimer Jordan High School in Morris

== California ==
- Jordan Secondary Learning Center in Garden Grove
- Jordan High School (Long Beach, California)
- Jordan High School (Los Angeles, California)

== Georgia ==
- Jordan Vocational High School in Columbus

== Michigan ==
- East Jordan High School in East Jordan

== Minnesota ==
- Jordan High School (Jordan, Minnesota)
- Jordan Junior High School, a former Minneapolis Public Schools facility

== New York ==
- Jordan-Elbridge High School in Jordan

== North Carolina ==
- Charles E. Jordan High School in Durham
- Jordan Matthews High in Siler City

== Oregon ==
- Jordan Valley High School in Jordan Valley

== Texas ==
- Barbara Jordan High School in Houston
- Jordan High School (Fulshear, Texas)

== Utah ==
- Jordan High School (Sandy, Utah)
- Jordan Resource Center in Midvale
- Jordan Valley School in Midvale
- West Jordan High School

== See also ==
- Jordan (disambiguation)
