= Sinking Creek (Turnback Creek tributary) =

Stream in the US state of Missouri

Sinking Creek is a stream in Lawrence and Dade counties of southwest Missouri. It is a tributary of Turnback Creek.

The stream source is in the northeast corner of Lawrence County at 37°16′55″N 93°40′54″W. The confluence with TurnBack Creek in south east Dade County is at 37°22′19″N 93°47′38″W.

The stream flows past the southwest edge of Everton and the village of Pilgrim. The St. Louis–San Francisco Railway follows the stream valley.

Sinking Creek was named for its status as a losing stream.

== See also ==
- List of rivers of Missouri
