= Jordan Township, Ripley County, Missouri =

Township in Ripley County, Missouri, U.S.

Coordinates: 36.7614°N 90.8414°W

Jordan Township is an inactive township in Ripley County, in the U.S. state of Missouri.

Jordan Township was erected in 1871, and named after the local Jordan family.
