= Jordan Township, Hickory County, Missouri =

Township in Hickory County, Missouri, USA

Coordinates: 38.0281°N 93.1319°W

Jordan Township is an inactive township in Hickory County, in the U.S. state of Missouri.

Jordan Township takes its name from the community of Jordan, Missouri.
