= Jordán Reservoir =

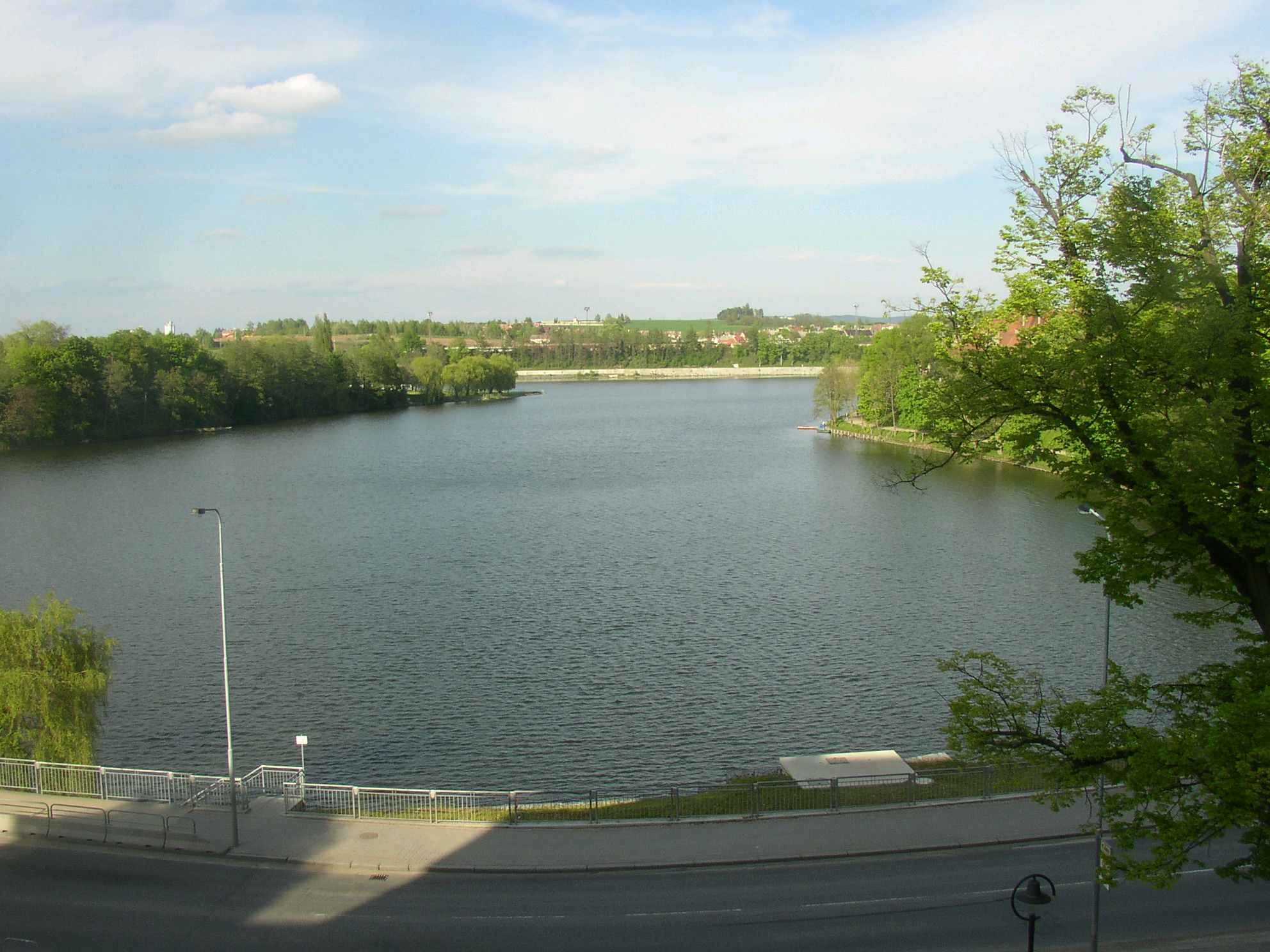
- View on Jordán from its levee

- Location within Czech Republic
- Location: Tábor, South Bohemian Region, Czech Republic
- Coordinates: 49°25′17″N 14°39′54″E
- Type: reservoir
- Built: 1492
- Surface area: 50 hectares (120 acres)
- Max. depth: 14 metres (46 ft)

Jordán Reservoir (Czech: vodní nádrž Jordán) is a reservoir inside the town of Tábor in the South Bohemian Region of the Czech Republic. Built in 1492, it is the oldest dam in Central Europe.

== History and parametres ==
The reservoir was created by creating an earth dam across the Tismenický brook with the purpose of providing drinking water for the town's inhabitants. Later, it was used for aquaculture. Today it is used as a place of recreation. The levee of the reservoir is 18 metres high, and the area is 50 hectares (120 acres). It contains around 3 million m^{3} of water. The deepest point is 14 metres (46 ft) below the surface.

Jordánský brook flows out from the reservoir, with the 18-metre high Jordánský waterfall just after the levee. A short distance upstream on Košínský brook, next to the village of Náchod, lies a smaller dam named Malý Jordán ("Small Jordán").

In 1991, a road bridge was built over the reservoir. The bridge is suspended on a single 77-metre high pylon. The length of the bridge is 208.5 m, and it runs 10.5 m above the water surface.

== Recreation ==
The northern bank of Jordán is called Plovka and it is often used in summer for sunbathing. There is also a beach which is used in summer for swimming and a restaurant. It is also possible to lend paddle boats and normal boats there. Near the east part of Jordán is a traffic park. There is also a children's playground including a sandbox and climbing frame. On the south side, there are many pontoons.

== Setting ==
Jordán is located in the east part of Tábor, next to the main square.

== Fauna ==
In Jordán the greatest fish that has ever been documented was a carp weighing 28 kilograms (62 lb), found dead on the shore.
