= Everton, Missouri =

- City
- Location of Everton, Missouri
- Coordinates: 37°20′34″N 93°42′09″W
- Country: United States
- State: Missouri
- County: Dade

Area
  - Total: 0.34 sq mi (0.89 km^{2})
  - Land: 0.34 sq mi (0.89 km^{2})
  - Water: 0 sq mi (0.00 km^{2})
- Elevation: 1,093 ft (333 m)

Population (2020)
  - Total: 273
  - Density: 791.2/sq mi (305.47/km^{2})
- Time zone: UTC-6 (Central (CST))
  - Summer (DST): UTC-5 (CDT)
- ZIP code: 65646
- Area code: 417
- FIPS code: 29-22996
- GNIS feature ID: 2394715

Everton is a city in southeast Dade County, Missouri, United States. The population was 273 at the 2020 census.

== History ==
Everton was platted in 1881. The city was named by railroad officials in honor of a man with the surname Evert or Everett, but the identity of the namesake is unknown to the State Historical Society of Missouri. A post office called Everton has been in operation since 1881.

== Geography ==
Everton is located on the Springfield Plateau region of the Ozarks in southeast Dade County, south of Stockton Lake between Ash Grove and Greenfield.

U.S. Route 160 passes the east side of the town and the St. Louis–San Francisco Railway passes the southwest side, along Sinking Creek.

According to the United States Census Bureau, the city has a total area of 0.35 square miles (0.91 km^{2}), all land.

== Demographics ==
Historical population
Census	Pop.	Note	%±
1900	630		—
1910	522		−17.1%
1920	463		−11.3%
1930	368		−20.5%
1940	368		0.0%
1950	306		−16.8%
1960	261		−14.7%
1970	264		1.1%
1980	317		20.1%
1990	325		2.5%
2000	322		−0.9%
2010	319		−0.9%
2020	273		−14.4%
U.S. Decennial Census

=== 2010 census ===
As of the census of 2010, there were 319 people, 128 households, and 90 families living in the city. The population density was 911.4 inhabitants per square mile (351.9/km^{2}). There were 168 housing units at an average density of 480.0 per square mile (185.3/km^{2}). The racial makeup of the city was 94.7% White, 0.9% African American, 1.6% Native American, and 2.8% from two or more races. Hispanic or Latino of any race were 1.6% of the population.

There were 128 households, of which 31.3% had children under the age of 18 living with them, 58.6% were married couples living together, 7.0% had a female householder with no husband present, 4.7% had a male householder with no wife present, and 29.7% were non-families. 27.3% of all households were made up of individuals, and 11% had someone living alone who was 65 years of age or older. The average household size was 2.49 and the average family size was 2.99.

The median age in the city was 39.3 years. 25.7% of residents were under the age of 18; 6.5% were between the ages of 18 and 24; 24.1% were from 25 to 44; 27.7% were from 45 to 64; and 16% were 65 years of age or older. The gender makeup of the city was 50.8% male and 49.2% female.

=== 2000 census ===
As of the census of 2000, there were 322 people, 134 households, and 88 families living in the city. The population density was 939.3 inhabitants per square mile (362.7/km^{2}). There were 159 housing units at an average density of 463.8 per square mile (179.1/km^{2}). The racial makeup of the city was 97.52% White, 0.93% Native American, and 1.55% from two or more races. Hispanic or Latino of any race were 0.31% of the population.

There were 134 households, out of which 28.4% had children under the age of 18 living with them, 51.5% were married couples living together, 9.7% had a female householder with no husband present, and 34.3% were non-families. 31.3% of all households were made up of individuals, and 18.7% had someone living alone who was 65 years of age or older. The average household size was 2.40 and the average family size was 3.05.

In the city the population was spread out, with 25.8% under the age of 18, 9.9% from 18 to 24, 23.6% from 25 to 44, 24.8% from 45 to 64, and 15.8% who were 65 years of age or older. The median age was 38 years. For every 100 females, there were 84.0 males. For every 100 females age 18 and over, there were 83.8 males.

The median income for a household in the city was $30,208, and the median income for a family was $33,571. Males had a median income of $28,125 versus $16,111 for females. The per capita income for the city was $11,464. About 16.3% of families and 20.3% of the population were below the poverty line, including 22.1% of those under age 18 and 33.3% of those age 65 or over.

== Recreation ==
Everton contains a public park named Dye's Park to the south of the city. This park boasts the Historic Dade County Courthouse, also known as the Penn Cabin, which was the county's first courthouse.
