= Hormone-sensitive lipase =

Enzyme

LIPE

Identifiers
- Aliases: LIPE, AOMS4, FPLD6, HSL, LHS, lipase E, hormone sensitive type, REH
- External IDs: OMIM: 151750; MGI: 96790; GeneCards: LIPE
Enzyme activity
EC #	BRENDA	ExPASy	KEGG	MetaCyc
3.1.1.23	↗	↗	↗	↗
3.1.1.79	↗	↗	↗	↗

Gene location (Human)
Chr.	Chromosome 19 (human)
Band	19q13.2	Start	42,401,514 bp
Band	19q13.2	End	42,427,388 bp

Gene location (Mouse)
Chr.	Chromosome 7 (mouse)
Band	7 A3|7 13.78 cM	Start	25,078,952 bp
Band	7 A3|7 13.78 cM	End	25,098,135 bp
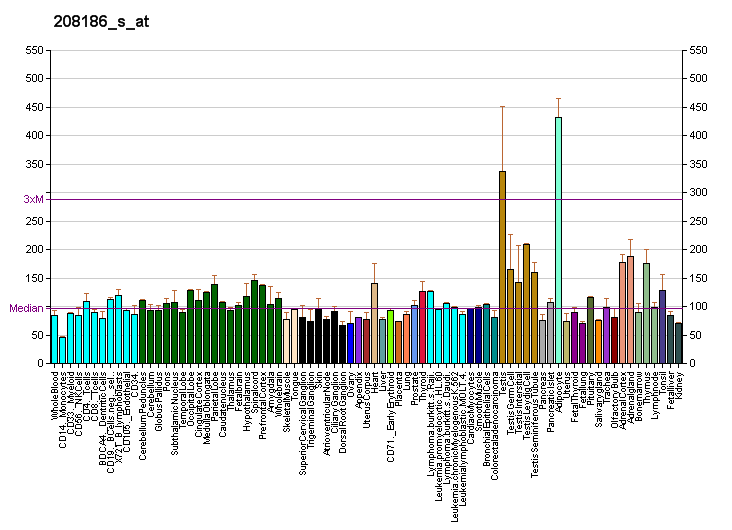

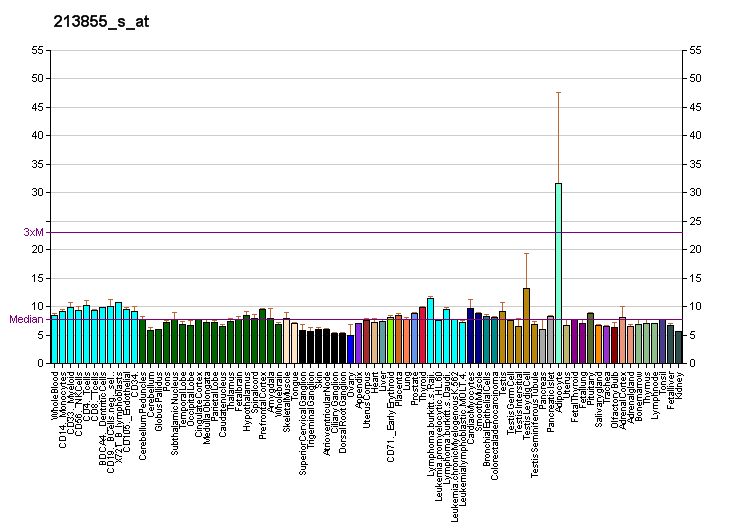
RNA expression pattern
Bgee	Human / Mouse (ortholog); Top expressed in: C1 segment; subcutaneous adipose tissue; pericardium; right testis; left testis; inferior ganglion of vagus nerve; apex of heart; middle frontal gyrus; inferior olivary nucleus; subthalamic nucleus / Top expressed in: brown adipose tissue; lactiferous gland; white adipose tissue; subcutaneous adipose tissue; seminiferous tubule; embryo; intercostal muscle; tunica adventitia of aorta; muscle of thigh; granulocyte; More reference expression data
BioGPS	More reference expression data
Gene ontology
Molecular function	lipase activity; triglyceride lipase activity; hormone-sensitive lipase activity; protein binding; hydrolase activity; protein kinase binding; serine hydrolase activity
Cellular component	cytoplasm; membrane; lipid droplet; plasma membrane; caveola; cytosol
Biological process	diacylglycerol catabolic process; steroid metabolic process; lipid metabolism; cholesterol metabolic process; lipid catabolic process; protein phosphorylation; long-chain fatty acid catabolic process; metabolism; triglyceride catabolic process
Sources:Amigo / QuickGO
Orthologs
Databases	NCBI: entry; OMA: entry
Species	Human	Mouse
Entrez	3991	16890
Ensembl	ENSG00000079435	ENSMUSG00000003123
UniProt	Q05469	P54310
RefSeq (mRNA)	NM_005357	NM_001039507; NM_010719
RefSeq (protein)	NP_005348	NP_001034596; NP_034849
Location (UCSC)	Chr 19: 42.4 – 42.43 Mb	Chr 7: 25.08 – 25.1 Mb
PubMed search
- Wikidata
View/Edit Human	View/Edit Mouse

Hormone-sensitive lipase (HSL) N-terminus

Identifiers
- Symbol: HSL_N
- Pfam: PF06350
- InterPro: IPR010468
Available protein structures:
- PDB: IPR010468 PF06350 (ECOD; PDBsum)
- AlphaFold: IPR010468; PF06350

Hormone-sensitive lipase (EC 3.1.1.79, HSL), also previously known as cholesteryl ester hydrolase (CEH), sometimes referred to as triacylglycerol lipase, is an enzyme that, in humans, is encoded by the LIPE gene, and catalyzes the following reaction:

(1) diacylglycerol + H_{2}O = monoacylglycerol + a carboxylate
(2) triacylglycerol + H_{2}O = diacylglycerol + a carboxylate
(3) monoacylglycerol + H_{2}O = glycerol + a carboxylate

HSL is an intracellular neutral lipase capable of hydrolyzing a variety of esters. The enzyme has a long and a short form. The long form is expressed in steroidogenic tissues such as testis, where it converts cholesteryl esters to free cholesterol for steroid hormone production. The short form is expressed in adipose tissue, among others, where it hydrolyzes stored triglycerides to free fatty acids.

== Nomenclature ==
During fasting-state the increased free fatty acid secretion by adipocyte cells was attributed to the hormone epinephrine, hence the name "hormone-sensitive lipase". Other catecholamines and adrenocorticotropic hormone (ACTH) can also stimulate such responses. Such enzymatic action plays a key role in providing major source of energy for most cells.

== Activation ==
Extracellular hormones, such as glucagon, epinephrine, thyroid-stimulating hormone, or adrenocorticotropic hormone (ACTH), bind to their respective G protein–coupled receptors (GPCR). When a GPCR is activated by its extracellular ligand, a conformational change is induced in the receptor that is transmitted to an attached intracellular heterotrimeric G protein complex by protein domain dynamics. The Gs alpha subunit of the stimulated G protein complex exchanges GDP for GTP in a reaction catalyzed by the GPCR and is released from the complex. The activated Gs alpha subunit binds to and activates an enzyme called adenylyl cyclase, which, in turn, catalyzes the conversion of ATP into cyclic AMP (cAMP). cAMP binds to and activates protein kinase A (PKA). It is PKA, activated by a hormone-induced signal transduction cascade, that phosphorylates and activates hormone sensitive lipase (HSL), hence the name. In addition to phosphorylating HSL, PKA phosphorylates perilipins on the surface of lipid droplets within adipose cells. This triggers them to "spread out" and allow for HSL to enter the lipid droplet.

Activation of partially purified HSL requires Mg^{2+}, ATP, and cyclic AMP. Activation can be blocked when Ser552 is not phosphorylated because Ser554 is phosphorylated and when the dephosphorylation of Ser552 causes insulin to the insulin receptor, causing inhibition of lipolysis and stimulation of glucose transport.

Hormone stimulation of lipolysis in humans is similar to rats.

== Function ==
The main function of hormone-sensitive lipase is to mobilize stored fats. HSL functions to hydrolyze either a fatty acid from a triacylglycerol molecule, freeing a fatty acid and diglyceride, or freeing a fatty acid and monoglyceride. This process allows energy metabolism in mammals. Although HSL is able to catalyze hydrolysis of triglycerides and diglycerides, another enzyme found in adipose tissue, adipose triglyceride lipase (ATGL), has a higher affinity for triglycerides than HSL, and ATGL predominantly acts as the enzyme for triglyceride-specific hydrolysis in the adipocyte. Hormone-sensitive lipase, which has 11-fold greater affinity for diglycerides than triglycerides, predominantly cleaves these diglycerides, forming 2-monoglyceride and a free fatty acid.

HSL is activated when the body needs to mobilize energy stores, and so responds positively to catecholamines and ACTH. It is inhibited by insulin.

Another important role is the release of cholesterol from cholesteryl esters for use in the production of steroids and cholesterol efflux. Activity of HSL is important in preventing or ameliorating the generation of foam cells in atherosclerosis.
