= Jordan Creek (Johnson County, Iowa) =

Stream in Johnson County, Iowa, U.S.

Coordinates: 41.7972345°N 91.5226719°W

Jordan Creek is a stream in Johnson County, Iowa, in the United States.

Jordan Creek was so named when a pioneer fell into the creek, and he joked he had been baptized in the Jordan River.

== See also ==
- List of rivers of Iowa
