= Jordan Creek (Lindley Creek tributary) =

Stream in the American state of Missouri

Jordan Creek is a stream in western Dallas and eastern Polk counties of south central Missouri. It is a tributary of Lindley Creek.

The stream headwaters arise about two miles southwest of Louisburg and US Route 65. The stream flows southwest to west into Polk County to its confluence with Lindley Creek about one mile south of Rimby and Missouri Route 64.

The stream source area is at 37°44′59″N 93°09′56″W at an elevation of about 1125 feet. Its confluence is at 37°44′32″N 93°14′32″W at an elevation of 909 feet.

Jordan Creek has the name of the local Jordan family.

== See also ==
- List of rivers of Missouri
