= Jordan Township, Clearfield County, Pennsylvania =

Township in Pennsylvania, US

Coordinates: 40°50′19″N 78°34′26″W

- Township
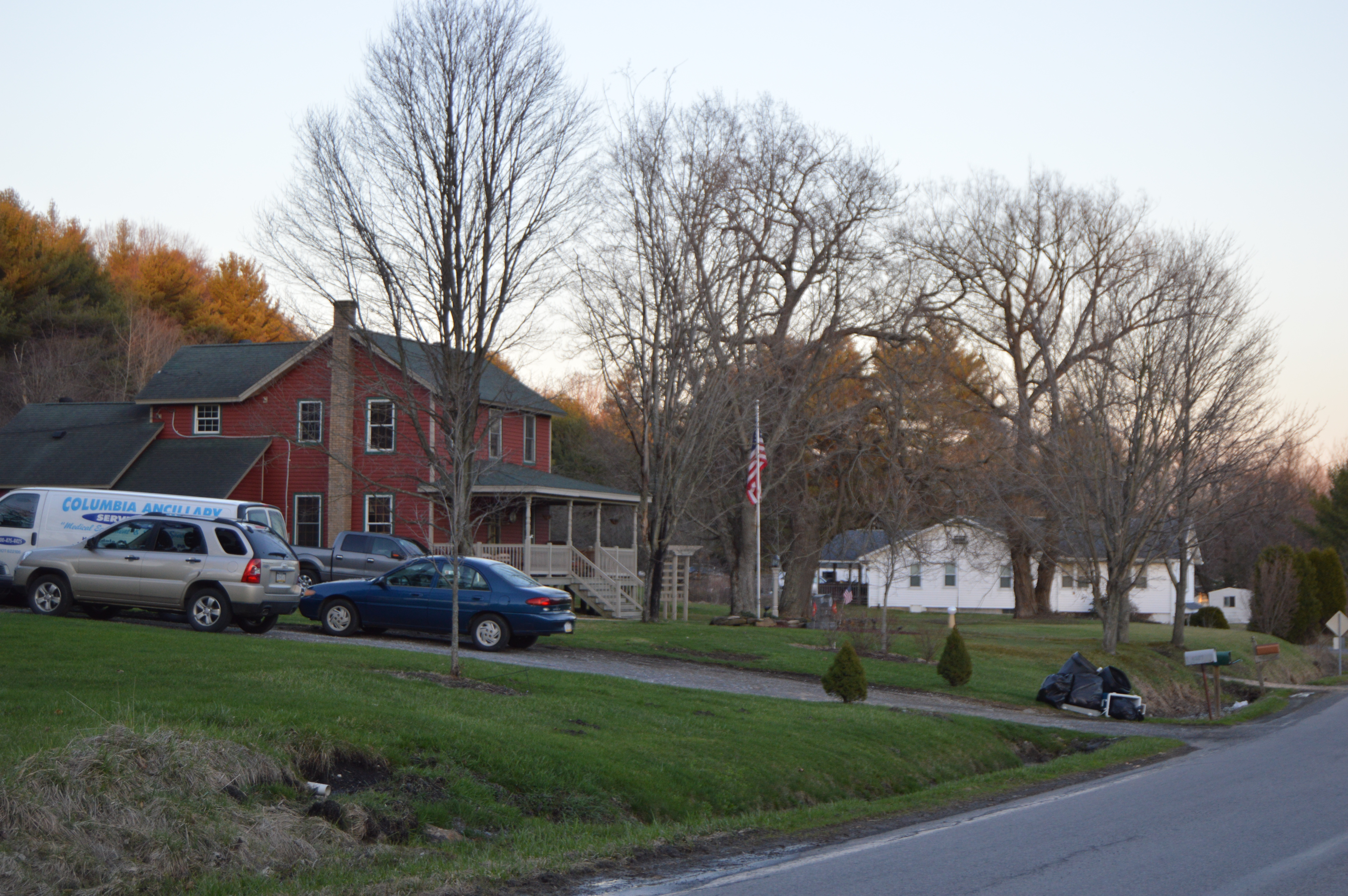
- Irvona Road in Berwinsdale

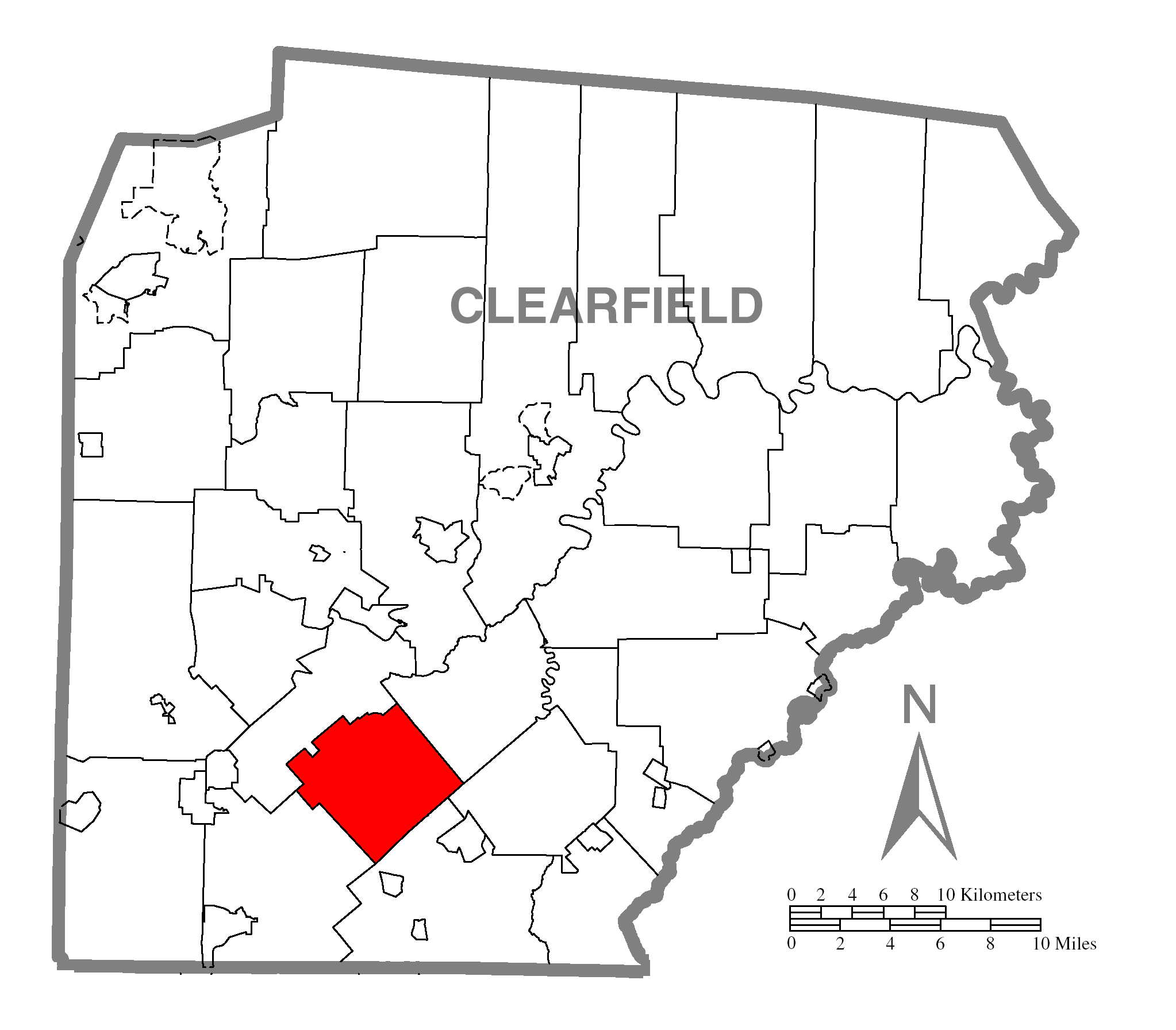
- Map of Clearfield County, Pennsylvania highlighting Jordan Township

- Map of Clearfield County, Pennsylvania
- Country: United States
- State: Pennsylvania
- County: Clearfield
- Settled: 1819
- Incorporated: 1835

Area
  - Total: 23.35 sq mi (60.47 km^{2})
  - Land: 23.26 sq mi (60.25 km^{2})
  - Water: 0.089 sq mi (0.23 km^{2})

Population (2020)
  - Total: 476 ▲
  - Estimate (2022): 473 ▼
  - Density: 19.8/sq mi (7.64/km^{2})
- Time zone: UTC-5 (Eastern (EST))
  - Summer (DST): UTC-4 (EDT)
- Area code: 814
- FIPS code: 42-033-38432

Jordan Township is a township in Clearfield County, Pennsylvania, United States. The population was 476 at the time of the 2020 census.

== Geography ==
According to the United States Census Bureau, the township has a total area of 24.2 square miles (63 km^{2}), of which 24.2 square miles (63 km^{2}) is land and 0.04 square miles (0.10 km^{2}) (0.08%) is water.

== Communities ==
- Ansonville
- Berwinsdale
- Bretonville
- McCartney
- Morgans Land

== Demographics ==
Historical population
Census	Pop.	Note	%±
2000	543		—
2010	461		−15.1%
2020	476		3.3%
2022 (est.)	473		−0.6%
U.S. Decennial Census

As of the census of 2000, there were 543 people, 198 households, and 152 families living in the township.

The population density was 22.4 people per square mile (8.7/km^{2}). There were 259 housing units at an average density of 10.7/sq mi (4.1/km^{2}).

The racial makeup of the township was 99.82% White and 0.18% African American.

There were 198 households, out of which 35.4% had children under the age of eighteen living with them; 63.6% were married couples living together, 8.6% had a female householder with no husband present, and 23.2% were non-families. 20.2% of all households were made up of individuals, and 10.6% had someone living alone who was sixty-five years of age or older.

The average household size was 2.74 and the average family size was 3.16.

Within the township, the population was spread out, with 25.4% who were under the age of eighteen, 9.2% from eighteen to twenty-four, 30.2% from twenty-five to forty-four, 22.1% from forty-five to sixty-four, and 13.1% who were sixty-five years of age or older. The median age was thirty-six years.

For every one hundred females, there were 104.1 males. For every one hundred females who were aged eighteen or older, there were 100.5 males.

The median income for a household in the township was $29,375, and the median income for a family was $32,667. Males had a median income of $28,125 compared with that of $18,500 for females.

The per capita income for the township was $12,600.

Roughly 12.2% of families and 16.2% of the population were living below the poverty line, including 19.4% of those who were under the age of eighteen and 9.0% of those who were aged sixty-five or older.

== Education ==
Students in the township attend schools in the Moshannon Valley School District.
