= ABHD5 =

Protein-coding gene in the species Homo sapiens

Identifiers
- Aliases: ABHD5, CDS, CGI58, IECN2, NCIE2, abhydrolase domain containing 5, abhydrolase domain containing 5, lysophosphatidic acid acyltransferase
- External IDs: OMIM: 604780; MGI: 1914719; GeneCards: ABHD5
Enzyme activity
EC #	BRENDA	ExPASy	KEGG	MetaCyc
2.3.1.51	↗	↗	↗	↗

Gene location (Human)
Chr.	Chromosome 3 (human)
Band	3p21.33	Start	43,690,108 bp
Band	3p21.33	End	43,734,371 bp

Gene location (Mouse)
Chr.	Chromosome 9 (mouse)
Band	9|9 F4	Start	122,180,673 bp
Band	9|9 F4	End	122,210,589 bp
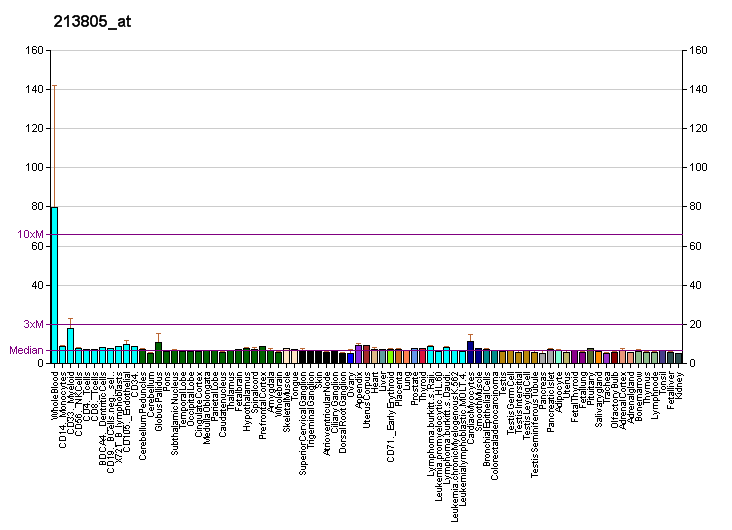

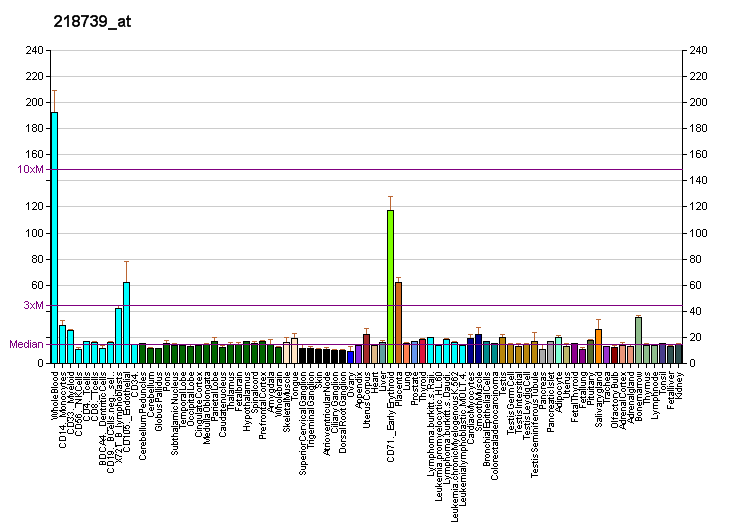
RNA expression pattern
Bgee	Human / Mouse (ortholog); Top expressed in: amniotic fluid; skin of thigh; blood; skin of abdomen; islet of Langerhans; monocyte; minor salivary glands; gonad; bone marrow; right lung / Top expressed in: spermatid; granulocyte; seminiferous tubule; spermatocyte; lip; brown adipose tissue; white adipose tissue; esophagus; decidua; retinal pigment epithelium; More reference expression data
BioGPS	More reference expression data
Gene ontology
Molecular function	transferase activity; 1-acylglycerol-3-phosphate O-acyltransferase activity; triglyceride lipase activity; lysophosphatidic acid acyltransferase activity; acyltransferase activity; carboxylic ester hydrolase activity
Cellular component	lipid droplet; cytoplasm; cytosol
Biological process	phosphatidic acid biosynthetic process; cell differentiation; lipid metabolism; fatty acid metabolic process; phospholipid biosynthetic process; negative regulation of sequestering of triglyceride; positive regulation of triglyceride catabolic process; positive regulation of lipid catabolic process; positive regulation of lipoprotein lipase activity; lipid homeostasis
Sources:Amigo / QuickGO
Orthologs
Databases	NCBI: entry; OMA: entry
Species	Human	Mouse
Entrez	51099	67469
Ensembl	ENSG00000011198	ENSMUSG00000032540
UniProt	Q8WTS1	Q9DBL9
RefSeq (mRNA)	NM_016006; NM_001355186; NM_001365649; NM_001365650	NM_026179; NM_001359207
RefSeq (protein)	NP_057090; NP_001342115; NP_001352578; NP_001352579	NP_080455; NP_001346136
Location (UCSC)	Chr 3: 43.69 – 43.73 Mb	Chr 9: 122.18 – 122.21 Mb
PubMed search
- Wikidata
View/Edit Human	View/Edit Mouse

1-acylglycerol-3-phosphate O-acyltransferase ABHD5, also known as comparative gene identification-58 (CGI-58), is an enzyme that in humans is encoded by the ABHD5 gene.

== Function ==
The protein encoded by this gene belongs to a large family of proteins defined by an alpha/beta hydrolase fold, and contains three sequence motifs that correspond to a catalytic triad found in the esterase/lipase/thioesterase subfamily. It differs from other members of this subfamily in that its putative catalytic triad contains an asparagine instead of the serine residue. Mutations in this gene have been associated with Chanarin-Dorfman syndrome, a triglyceride storage disease with impaired long-chain fatty acid oxidation.

CGI-58 is known to be a co-activator of adipose triglyceride lipase (ATGL/PNPLA2) that associates with lipid droplets in association with perilipin proteins. Phosphorylation of certain perilipins by protein kinase A causes dissociation of CGI-58 from the perilipins and permits interaction with ATGL. CGI-58 additionally interacts with beclin 1, and CGI-58 has been shown to promote autophagy in colorectal cancer in a PNPLA2-independent manner.
