= Adipose triglyceride lipase =

Mammalian protein found in humans

PNPLA2

Identifiers
- Aliases: PNPLA2, 1110001C14Rik, ATGL, PEDF-R, TTS-2.2, TTS2, iPLA2zeta, FP17548, patatin like phospholipase domain containing 2
- External IDs: OMIM: 609059; MGI: 1914103; GeneCards: PNPLA2
Enzyme activity
EC #	BRENDA	ExPASy	KEGG	MetaCyc
3.1.1.3	↗	↗	↗	↗
3.1.1.4	↗	↗	↗	↗

Gene location (Human)
Chr.	Chromosome 11 (human)
Band	11p15.5	Start	818,914 bp
Band	11p15.5	End	825,573 bp

Gene location (Mouse)
Chr.	Chromosome 7 (mouse)
Band	7|7 F5	Start	141,035,111 bp
Band	7|7 F5	End	141,040,656 bp
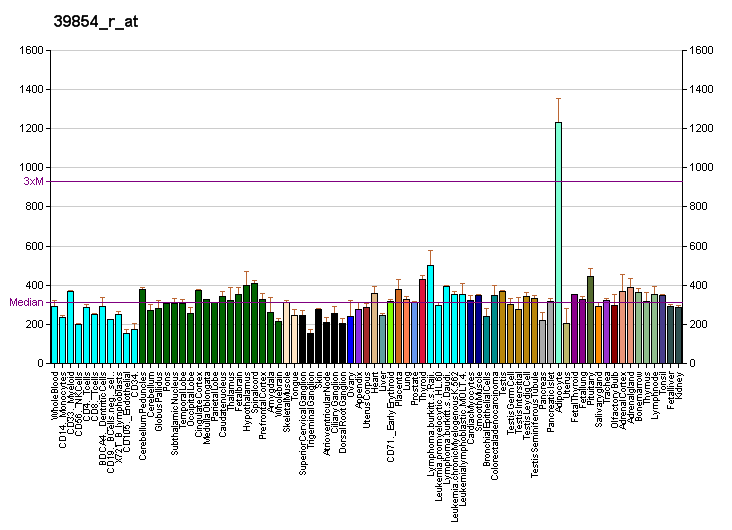

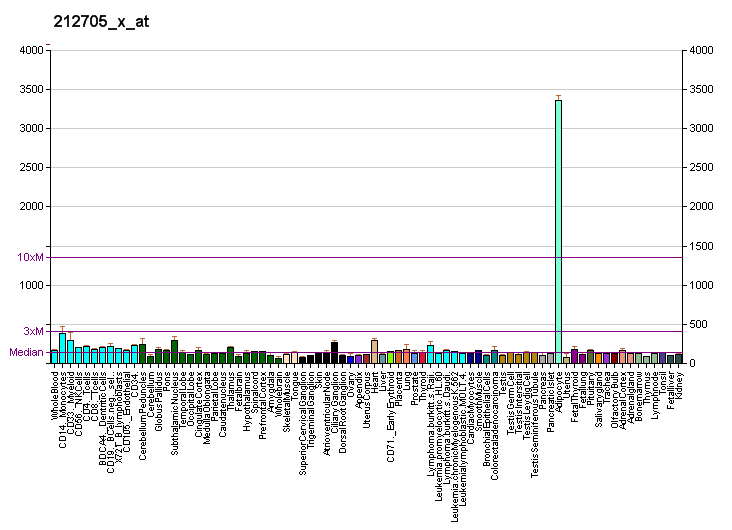
RNA expression pattern
Bgee	Human / Mouse (ortholog); Top expressed in: apex of heart; subcutaneous adipose tissue; left coronary artery; gastric mucosa; right lung; mucosa of transverse colon; minor salivary glands; body of stomach; right coronary artery; gastrocnemius muscle / Top expressed in: lactiferous gland; brown adipose tissue; white adipose tissue; muscle of thigh; subcutaneous adipose tissue; tunica adventitia of aorta; intercostal muscle; interventricular septum; cardiac muscles; myocardium of ventricle; More reference expression data
BioGPS	More reference expression data
Gene ontology
Molecular function	hydrolase activity; lipoprotein lipase activity; acylglycerol O-acyltransferase activity; triglyceride lipase activity
Cellular component	integral component of membrane; cytosol; lipid droplet; plasma membrane; endoplasmic reticulum membrane; cytoplasm; membrane; nucleoplasm; endoplasmic reticulum lumen
Biological process	lipid catabolic process; lipid storage; metabolism; negative regulation of sequestering of triglyceride; positive regulation of triglyceride catabolic process; acylglycerol acyl-chain remodeling; lipid droplet organization; lipid metabolism; triglyceride catabolic process; lipid homeostasis; post-translational protein modification; cellular lipid catabolic process
Sources:Amigo / QuickGO
Orthologs
Databases	NCBI: entry; OMA: entry
Species	Human	Mouse
Entrez	57104	66853
Ensembl	ENSG00000177666	ENSMUSG00000025509
UniProt	Q96AD5	Q8BJ56
RefSeq (mRNA)	NM_020376	NM_001163689; NM_025802
RefSeq (protein)	NP_065109	NP_001157161; NP_080078
Location (UCSC)	Chr 11: 0.82 – 0.83 Mb	Chr 7: 141.04 – 141.04 Mb
PubMed search
- Wikidata
View/Edit Human	View/Edit Mouse

Adipose triglyceride lipase, also known as patatin-like phospholipase domain-containing protein 2 and ATGL, is an enzyme that in humans is encoded by the PNPLA2 gene. ATGL catalyses the first reaction of lipolysis, where triacylglycerols are hydrolysed to diacylglycerols.

== Properties ==
ATGL has very high substrate specificity for triacylglycerols. It contains a catalytic dyad using serine-aspartic acid.

== Function ==
ATGL catalyses the first reaction of lipolysis. It hydrolysis triacylglycerols to diacylglycerols by attacking the fatty acid attached to carbon-3 of glycerol.

ATGL acts as a control mechanism of lipolysis, as variations in diacylglycerol concentration impact enzymes in later stages of lipolysis.

== Clinical significance ==
Defects in ATGL can cause problems in lipolysis, leading to neutral lipid storage disease. As triacylglycerols are not hydrolysed to diacylglycerols, there is a build-up of triacylglycerol droplets in granulocytes.

ATGL is regulated by insulin, and is similar to structure with adiponutrin, a protein that is regulated by nutrition. When there is a lack of insulin, there is an increased expression of the ATGL protein. Because adipose tissue triglyceride is a major form of energy storage, the study of how ATGL regulation and dysregulation can lead to potential problems will increase understanding of the pathophysiology behind metabolic disorders. ATGL is also the key enzyme that would be able to maintain a balance between mobilization and lipid storage. Lipolytic breakdown performed by ATGL would impact regulatory functions including but not limited to cell death, growth, signaling, metabolism, and gene expression.

== Regulation ==
There must be mechanisms set to maintain the balance between energy storage, and energy release; a dysregulation in the equilibrium result in metabolic disorder, a prime one being diabetes. Adipose Triglyceride Lipase (ATGL) can undergo activation through two different pathways: transcriptionally and through post-translational modification. Through the transcriptional pathway, Beta-adrenergic, a receptor that can form a complex with agonist such as epinephrine, results in the signal transduction pathway activation of Adipose Triglyceride Lipase (ATGL). The alternative pathway is through a post-translational modification specifically phosphorylation of a serine 406 residue located on the enzyme by a kinase known as AMP activated protein kinase (AMPK). Further, ATGL concentrations are regulated via the SACM1L—PtdIns4P—E3 ligase complex axis. Fasting and associated low glucose concentrations lead to translocation of SACM1L to the Golgi apparatus, where SACM1L dephosphorylates Golgi membrane lipids PtdIns4P to PtdIns. Since PtdIns4P stabilizes the E3 ligase complex, lower PtdIns4P levels lead to break down of the E3 ligase complex, and thus lower ubiquitination of ATGL for proteosomal degradation, ultimately increasing ATGL levels and ATGL-mediated lipolysis.

Insulin is a hormone that regulates the enzyme ATGL, it inhibits the enzyme, favoring lipid storage over lipolysis. One pathway of inhibition of ATGL when insulin is present is the activation of SIRT1, which inhibits FoxO1. Specifically, FoxO1 is repressed from localizing to the nucleus by deacetylation in adipocytes.

== Therapeutic approaches ==
Upregulation of Adipose Triglyceride Lipase (ATGL) was successfully achieved by inhibiting phosphatidylinositol 4-kinase beta (PI4KB), an enzyme that phosphorylates Golgi membrane lipids PtdIns to PtdIns4P. Given that PtdIns4P stabilizes the E3 ligase complex, which in turn uniquitinates ATGL for proteosomal degradation, lower PtdIns4P levels lead to higher ATGL levels. ATGL upregulation was shown to increase lipolysis of tissue triglycerides and ameliorated non-alcoholic fatty liver disease and metabolic dysfunction associated steatohepatitis (MASH). Therefore, PI4KB inhibitors have been successfully administered as treatment for MASH.
