= SEC16A =

Protein-coding gene in the species Homo sapiens

Identifiers
- Aliases: SEC16A, KIAA0310, SEC16L, p250, SEC16 homolog A, endoplasmic reticulum export factor
- External IDs: OMIM: 612854; MGI: 2139207; GeneCards: SEC16A

Gene location (Human)
Chr.	Chromosome 9 (human)
Band	9q34.3	Start	136,440,096 bp
Band	9q34.3	End	136,483,759 bp

Gene location (Mouse)
Chr.	Chromosome 2 (mouse)
Band	2|2 A3	Start	26,299,443 bp
Band	2|2 A3	End	26,335,228 bp
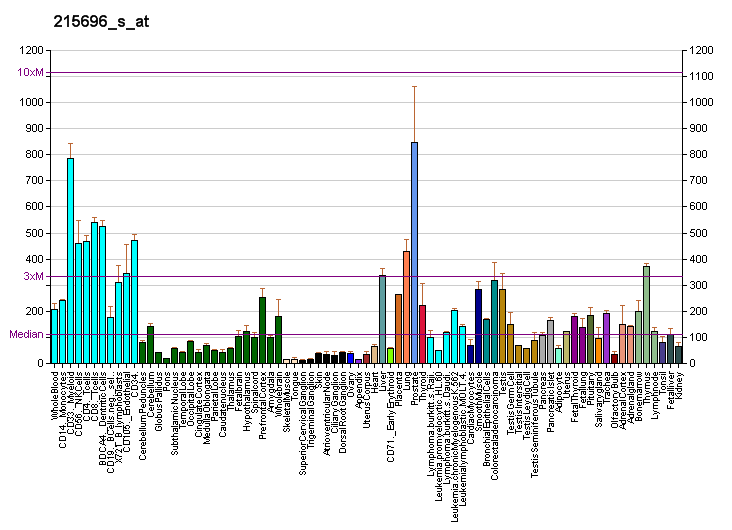
RNA expression pattern
Bgee	Human / Mouse (ortholog); Top expressed in: anterior pituitary; right lobe of liver; cardia; pylorus; body of stomach; right hemisphere of cerebellum; body of pancreas; fundus; nasal epithelium; mucosa of transverse colon / Top expressed in: zygote; parotid gland; lacrimal gland; submandibular gland; molar; pituitary gland; tail of embryo; genital tubercle; lobe of prostate; secondary oocyte; More reference expression data
BioGPS	More reference expression data
Gene ontology
Molecular function	protein binding
Cellular component	cytosol; Golgi membrane; Golgi apparatus; endoplasmic reticulum membrane; membrane; endoplasmic reticulum; cytoplasm; ER to Golgi transport vesicle membrane; organelle membrane; intracellular membrane-bounded organelle; perinuclear region of cytoplasm; endoplasmic reticulum exit site
Biological process	protein transport; COPII vesicle coating; substantia nigra development; vesicle-mediated transport; endoplasmic reticulum organization; transport; endoplasmic reticulum to Golgi vesicle-mediated transport; Golgi organization; protein exit from endoplasmic reticulum; response to endoplasmic reticulum stress; Golgi to plasma membrane CFTR protein transport; protein stabilization; positive regulation of protein exit from endoplasmic reticulum; protein localization to endoplasmic reticulum exit site; protein localization to plasma membrane
Sources:Amigo / QuickGO
Orthologs
Databases	NCBI: entry; OMA: entry
Species	Human	Mouse
Entrez	9919	227648
Ensembl	ENSG00000148396	ENSMUSG00000026924
UniProt	O15027	E9QAT4
RefSeq (mRNA)	NM_001276418; NM_014866	NM_153125
RefSeq (protein)	NP_001263347; NP_055681	NP_694765
Location (UCSC)	Chr 9: 136.44 – 136.48 Mb	Chr 2: 26.3 – 26.34 Mb
PubMed search
- Wikidata
View/Edit Human	View/Edit Mouse

Protein transport protein Sec16A is a protein that in humans is encoded by the SEC16A gene.
