= Gloxinia =

Gloxinia can refer to:

- Gloxinia (genus), flowering plants in the family Gesneriaceae
- Sinningia speciosa, a plant species formerly classified in the genus Gloxinia and still commonly known by that name, in the family Gesneriaceae
- Creeping gloxinia (Lophospermum erubescens), in the family Plantaginaceae, formerly in Scrophulariaceae
- Hardy gloxinia (Incarvillea delavayi), in the family Bignoniaceae
