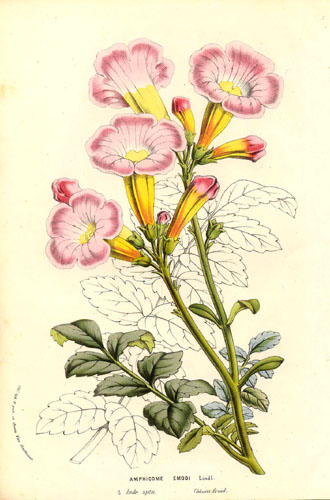
- Incarvillea emodi

Scientific classification
- Kingdom: Plantae
- Clade: Tracheophytes
- Clade: Angiosperms
- Clade: Eudicots
- Clade: Asterids
- Order: Lamiales
- Family: Bignoniaceae
- Tribe: Tecomeae
- Genus: Incarvillea; Juss.

Species
- See text

= Incarvillea =

Genus of flowering plants

Incarvillea is a genus of about 16 species of flowering plants in the family Bignoniaceae, native to central and eastern Asia, with most of the species growing at high altitudes in the Himalaya and Tibet. The most familiar species is Incarvillea delavayi, a garden plant commonly known as hardy gloxinia (Note: even though Incarvillea is not closely related to Gloxinia and Sinningia ("florist Gloxinia"), which are Gesneriads.) or Chinese trumpet flower. Unlike most other members of Bignoniaceae, which are mainly tropical woody plants, species of Incarvillea are herbaceous perennial plants from temperate regions.

Genetic analysis supports the division of the genus into five clades: the subgenus Niedzwedzkia, the subgenus Amphicome, the subgenus Incarvillea, the subgenus Pteroscleris, and the species I. olgae, which does not fit into a subgenus. It may be given a subgenus of its own in a future study.

Incarvillea is named after the French Jesuit missionary and botanist Pierre Nicholas Le Chéron d'Incarville.

Species include:

- Incarvillea altissima
- Incarvillea arguta
- Incarvillea beresowskii
- Incarvillea compacta
- Incarvillea delavayi
- Incarvillea dissectifoliola
- Incarvillea emodi (Royle ex Lindl.) Chatterjee
- Incarvillea forrestii
- Incarvillea lutea
- Incarvillea mairei
- Incarvillea olgae
- Incarvillea potaninii
- Incarvillea semiretschenskia
- Incarvillea sinensis (syn. I. variabilis)
- Incarvillea younghusbandii
- Incarvillea zhongdianensis

== Chemistry ==
Incarvillea sinensis contains the alkaloid incarvillateine.

== Gallery ==
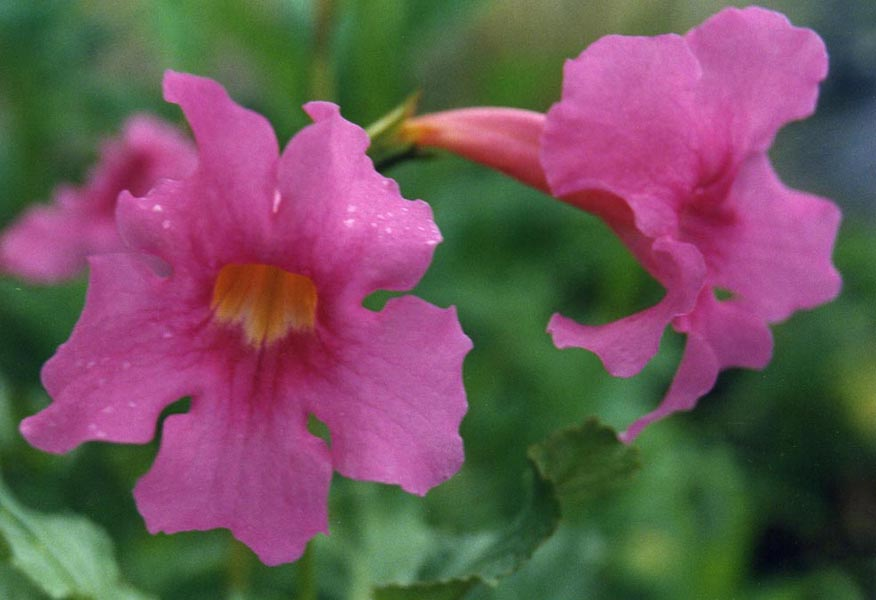
Incarvillea delavayi

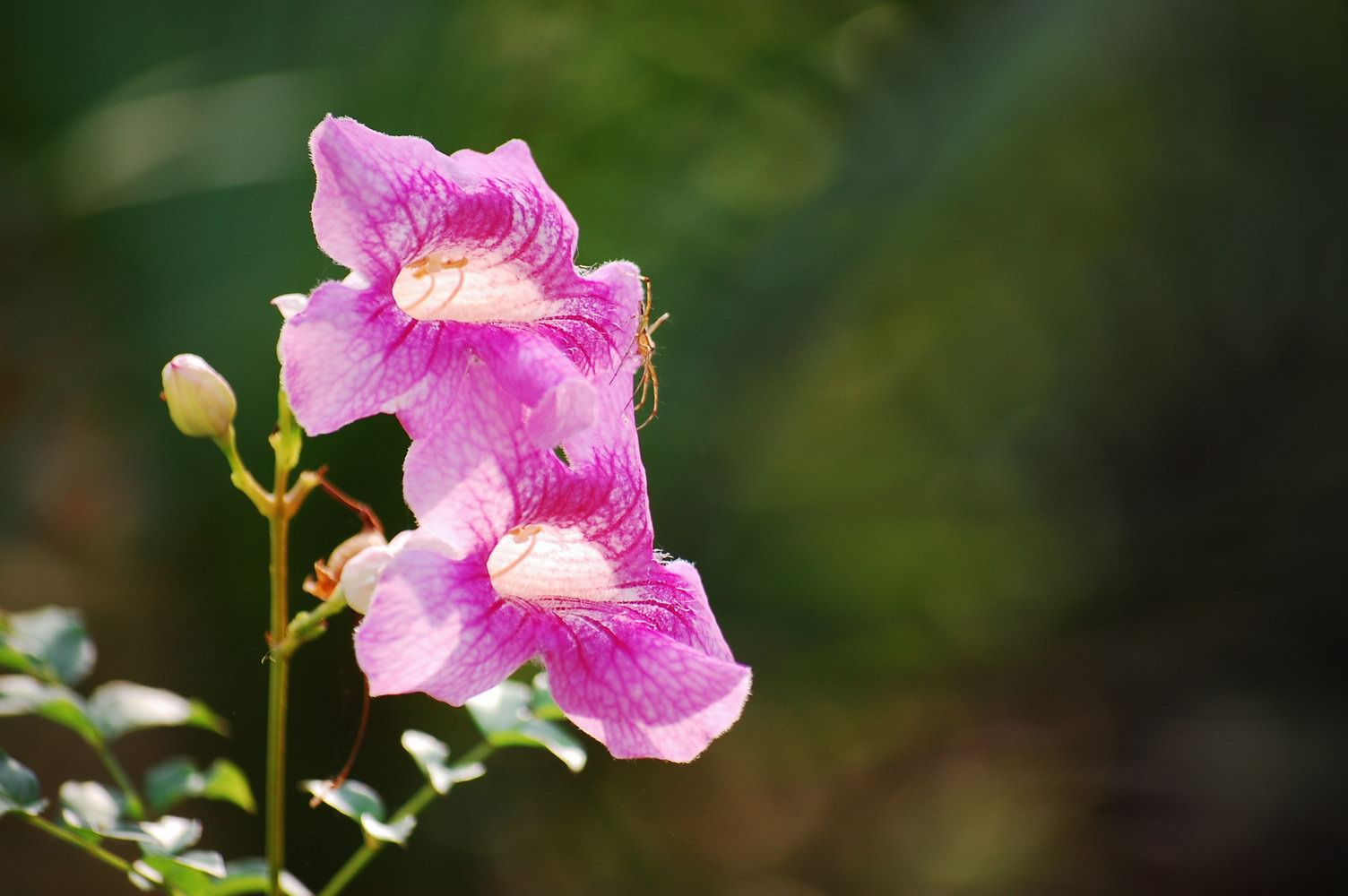
Incarvillea sinensis. This flower is known as Gul-e-Taqaar (ګلِ ټقار) in Pashto. It is believed to grow in high-altitude mountainous regions, particularly in the mountainous areas of Bajaur, Pukhtunkhwa. Further research is needed to establish its precise botanical classification, geographical distribution, and habitat requirements.
