= C18H16O4 =

The molecular formula C_{18}H_{16}O_{4} may refer to:

- Truxillic acid, several crystalline stereoisomeric cyclic dicarboxylic acids
- Truxinic acid, several stereoisomeric cyclic dicarboxylic acids with the formula
- Dalosirvat
