= Benjamin Peter Gloxin =

German physician and botanical writer

Benjamin Peter Gloxin (1765–1794) was a German physician and botanical writer who lived in Colmar. He is commemorated by the Brazilian genus Gloxinia and Sinningia speciosa, which is commonly called Gloxinia in the horticulture trade. In 1791, he was elected to the American Philosophical Society.

== Works ==
Observationes Botanicae 1785, Argentorati, Strasbourg.

He was honoured in 2005, when botanists (H.E.Moore) Roalson & Boggan named a monotypic genus of a flowering plant from Columba after Gloxin. Gloxinella and its one species, Gloxinella lindeniana.
