= Peperomia velutina =

Scientific classification
- Kingdom: Plantae
- Clade: Embryophytes
- Clade: Tracheophytes
- Clade: Spermatophytes
- Clade: Angiosperms
- Clade: Magnoliids
- Order: Piperales
- Family: Piperaceae
- Genus: Peperomia
- Species: P. velutina

Binomial name
- Peperomia velutina Linden & André

Species of flowering plant

Peperomia velutina is a species of flowering plant in the family Piperaceae, native to Colombia and Ecuador. It has gained the Royal Horticultural Society's Award of Garden Merit as a terrarium or greenhouse ornamental.

== Subtaxa ==
The following varieties are accepted:

- Peperomia velutina var. lanceolata C.DC. – Colombia
- Peperomia velutina var. velutina – Ecuador
