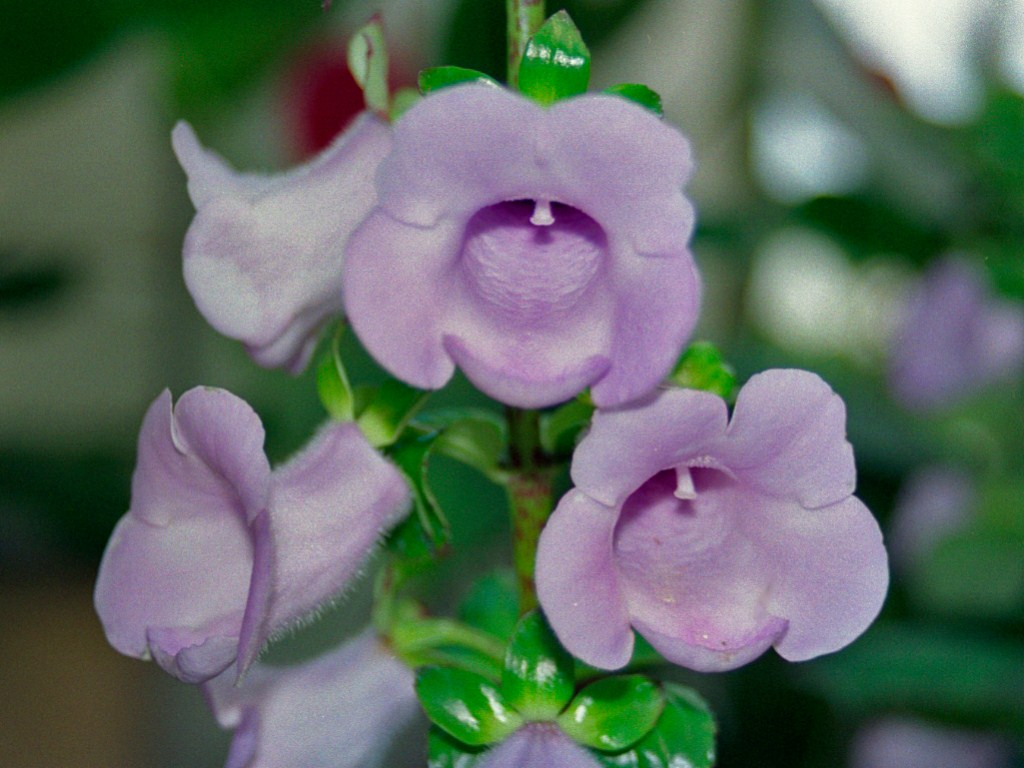
- Flowers of Gloxinia perennis

Scientific classification
- Kingdom: Plantae
- Clade: Tracheophytes
- Clade: Angiosperms
- Clade: Eudicots
- Clade: Asterids
- Order: Lamiales
- Family: Gesneriaceae
- Genus: Gloxinia
- Species: G. perennis

Binomial name
- Gloxinia perennis (L.) Fritsch, 1894

Synonyms
- Escheria gloxiniaeflora Regel; Eucolum crassifolium Salisb.; Gloxinia bicolor Poepp. ex Hanst.; Gloxinia heterophylla Poepp.; Gloxinia maculata L'Hér.; Gloxinia pallidiflora Hook.; Gloxinia suaveolens Decne.; Gloxinia trichantha Miq.; Gloxinia trichotoma Moench; Martynia perennis L.; Salisia gloxiniiflora Regel; Salisia maculata (L'Hér.) Regel; Salisia pallidiflora (Hook.) Regel; Salisia suaveolens (Decne.) Regel

= Gloxinia perennis =

Species of flowering plant

Gloxinia perennis is a species of tropical rhizomatous herbaceous flowering plant belonging to the family Gesneriaceae. It is sometimes known as "Canterbury bells" (not to be confused with members of the genus Campanula, which go by the same name).

== Etymology ==
The genus name commemorate Benjamin Peter Gloxin (1765-1795), a German physician and botanical writer. The species epithet perennis, meaning "perennial," was meant to distinguish it from the annual Martynia annua, as the species was first placed in the genus Martynia.

== Description ==
Gloxinia perennis has a raceme-like flowering stem. The flowers are showy, bell-shaped, nodding, pale purple or violet-lavender, mint-scented, about 4 cm long. The stem is erect, glabrous and reaches a height of about 60–120 cm. The leaves are opposite, glabrous and veined. The flowering period extended from mid Summer until early Fall. Fruits are ovoid to elliptical capsules, containing numerous minute seeds. This plant has scaly underground rhizomes.

== Distribution ==
This species has a wide range in Central and South America, from Costa Rica up to Colombia, Brazil and Peru. It is primarily found in the Andes of South America, while it has probably escaped from cultivation in Central America and the West Indies. Its exact original range is unknown.

== Habitat ==
Gloxinia perennis prefers shady and humid places and grows in forests, on rocks and river banks.
