= Vriesea guttata =

Scientific classification
- Kingdom: Plantae
- Clade: Tracheophytes
- Clade: Angiosperms
- Clade: Monocots
- Clade: Commelinids
- Order: Poales
- Family: Bromeliaceae
- Genus: Vriesea
- Species: V. guttata

Binomial name
- Vriesea guttata Linden & André

Synonyms
- Tillandsia guttata (Linden & André) Baker; Vriesea guttata var. eguttata Reitz; Vriesea guttata var. striata Reitz

Species of plant

Vriesea guttata is a species of flowering plant in the Bromeliaceae family. It is endemic to Brazil.

== Cultivars ==
- Vriesea 'Cherry Bow'
- Vriesea 'Cupid's Bow'
- Vriesea 'Donneaina'
- Vriesea 'Golden Plaits'
- Vriesea 'Inspektor Perring'
- Vriesea 'Karamea Granada'
- Vriesea 'Lav (Lavender)'
- Vriesea 'Petersiana'
- Vriesea 'Regent'
- Vriesea 'Sanderiana'
- Vriesea 'Wingding'
