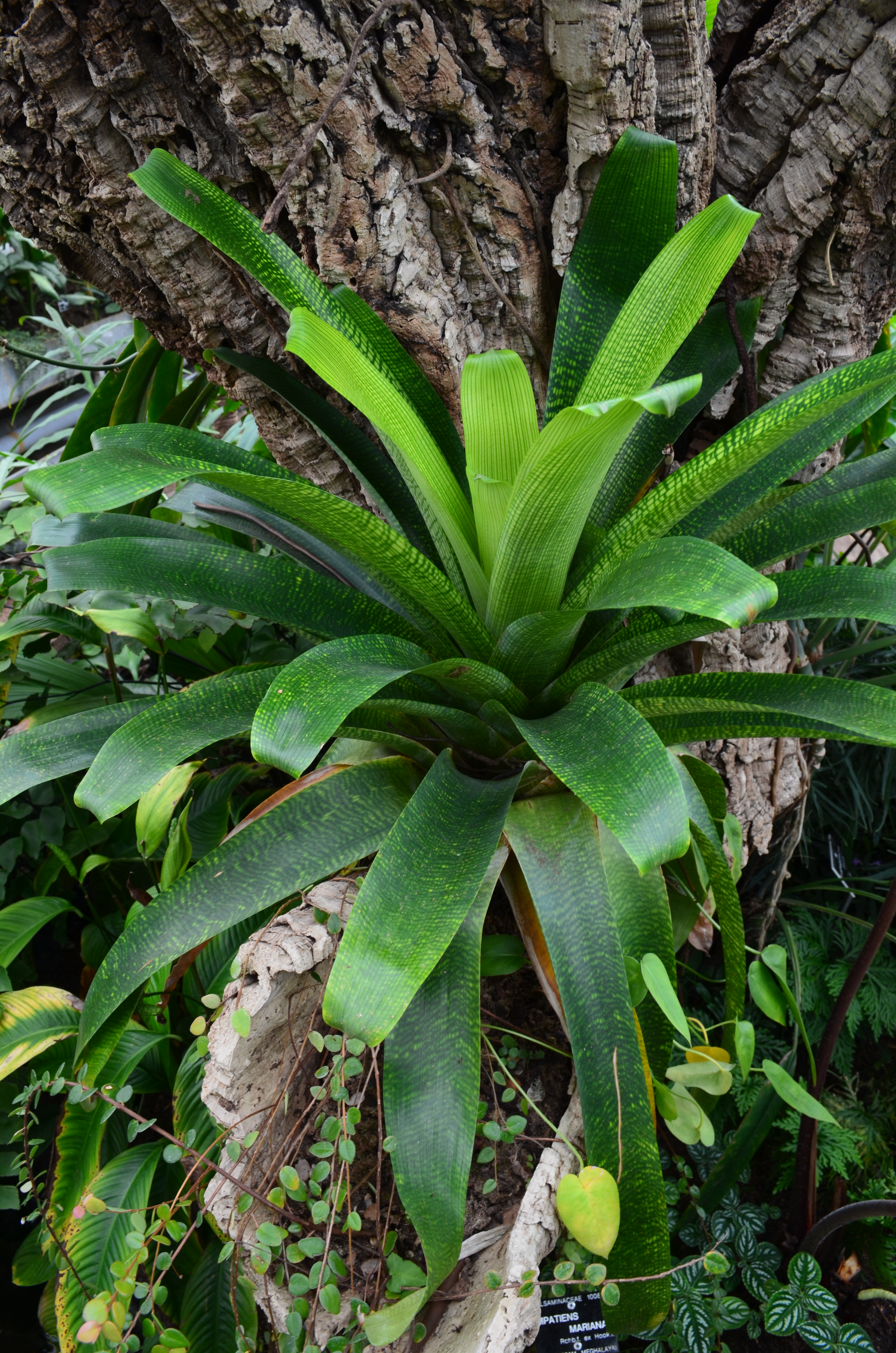

Scientific classification
- Kingdom: Plantae
- Clade: Tracheophytes
- Clade: Angiosperms
- Clade: Monocots
- Clade: Commelinids
- Order: Poales
- Family: Bromeliaceae
- Genus: Vriesea
- Species: V. fenestralis

Binomial name
- Vriesea fenestralis Linden & André

Synonyms
- Tillandsia fenestralis (Linden & André) Hook.f. Vriesea hamata L.B.Sm.

= Vriesea fenestralis =

Species of plant

Vriesea fenestralis is a species of flowering plant in the Bromeliaceae family. It is endemic to Brazil.

== Cultivars ==
- Vriesea 'Burgundy Bubbles'
- Vriesea 'Caramel Fudge'
- Vriesea 'El Supremo'
- Vriesea 'Elfi Natascha'
- Vriesea 'Emerald Meadows'
- Vriesea 'Fenestralo-Fulgida'
- Vriesea 'Fenestralo-Rex'
- Vriesea 'Frost Bite'
- Vriesea 'Ginoti'
- Vriesea 'Kakadu'
- Vriesea 'Magnisiana'
- Vriesea 'Magnusiana'
- Vriesea 'Mandy'
- Vriesea 'Mortfontanensis'
- Vriesea 'Natascha'
- Vriesea 'Red Ladder'
- Vriesea 'Sassie Sue'
- Vriesea 'Sphinx'
- Vriesea 'You Beaut'
