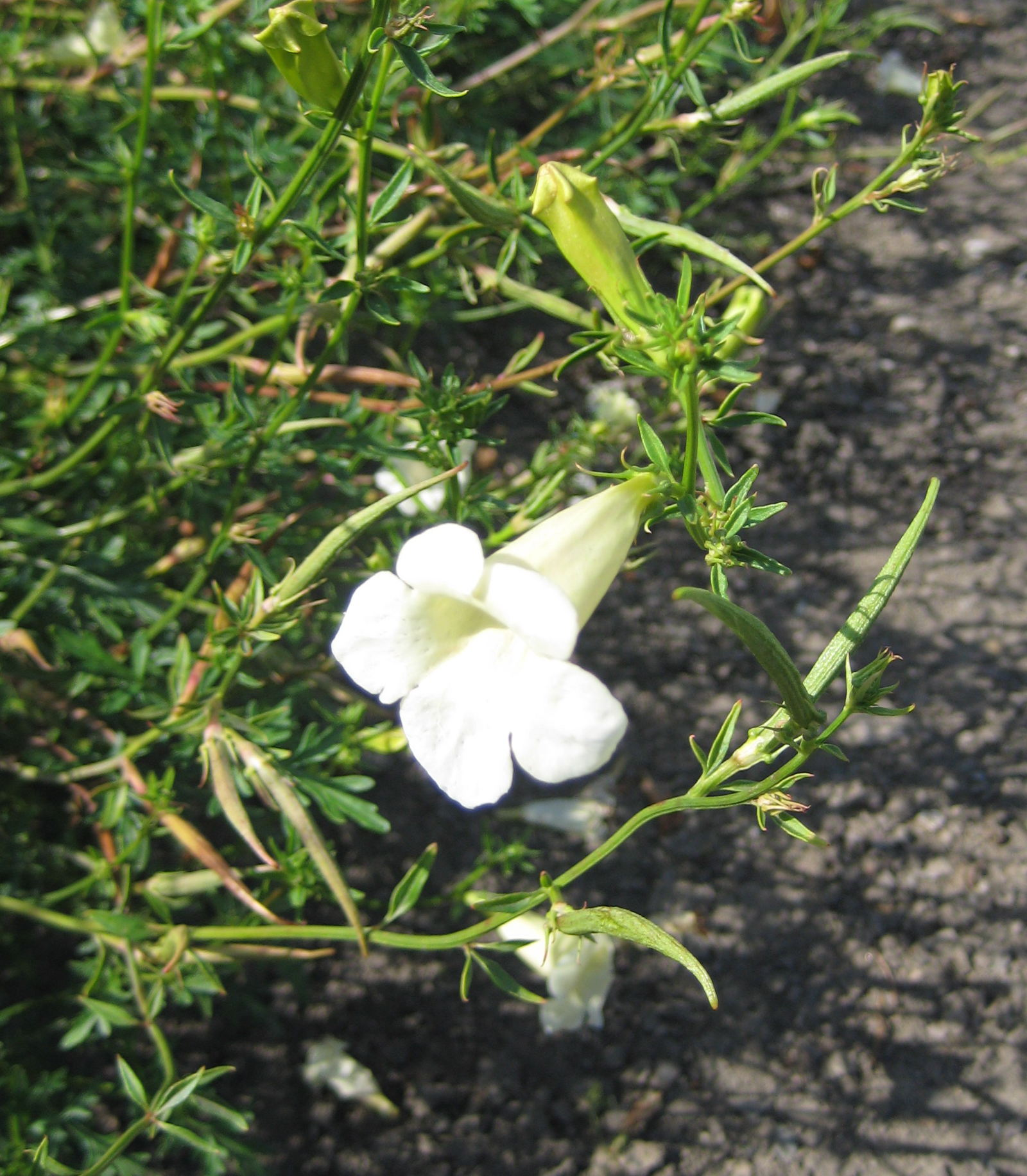

Scientific classification
- Kingdom: Plantae
- Clade: Embryophytes
- Clade: Tracheophytes
- Clade: Angiosperms
- Clade: Eudicots
- Clade: Asterids
- Order: Lamiales
- Family: Bignoniaceae
- Genus: Incarvillea
- Species: I. sinensis

Binomial name
- Incarvillea sinensis Lam.

= Incarvillea sinensis =

Species of flowering plant

Incarvillea sinensis is a plant species in the genus Incarvillea.

== Description ==
This species is native to Asia and grows to 2 feet tall at maturity. It flowers with rose-like pink flowers. The genus of this plant, Incarvillea is named after the French Jesuit missionary and botanist Pierre Nicholas Le Chéron d'Incarville.

== Uses ==
The plant has been used in traditional Chinese medicine as an analgesic and as a treatment for rheumatism. Incarvillateine isolated from Incarvillea sinensis has demonstrated significant analgesic activity when compared to the opiate alkaloid morphine.
