= Incarvillea semiretschenskia =

Conservation status
- Endangered (IUCN 2.3)

Scientific classification
- Kingdom: Plantae
- Clade: Embryophytes
- Clade: Tracheophytes
- Clade: Spermatophytes
- Clade: Angiosperms
- Clade: Eudicots
- Clade: Asterids
- Order: Lamiales
- Family: Bignoniaceae
- Genus: Incarvillea
- Subgenus: Incarvillea subg. Niedzwedzkia
- Species: I. semiretschenskia

Binomial name
- Incarvillea semiretschenskia (B.Fedtsch.) Grierson

Synonyms
- Niedzwedzkia semiretschenskia Fedtsch.

Genus of flowering plants

Incarvillea semiretschenskia is a rare perennial flower endemic to dry, rocky hillsides in Kazakhstan, placed on the IUCN Red List in 1997. It was first described as Niedzwedzkia semiretschenskia, the only species in the genus Niedzwedzkia. It has also been placed as the only species in Incarvillea subgenus Niedzwedzkia.

== Description ==
The plant has numerous wiry upright stems growing to a height of 45 cm from a sub-shrub base. The leaves are deeply incised with linear lobes. The orange-pink tubular flowers are 6 cm long by 4 cm across. The fruits are 5 cm long and feature six very wavy wings. Ploidy 2n = 22.

== Taxonomy ==
The species was first described by Boris Fedchenko in 1915 as Niedzwedzkia semiretschenskia, the only species in the genus Niedzwedzkia, named for the Russian botanist Vladislav Niedzwiecki. In 1931, Grierson transferred it to Incarvillea. A molecular phylogenetic study in 2005 found that Incarvillea semiretschenskia was basal to the rest of the genus Incarvillea, giving support to the placement in a separate subgenus, Incarvillea subgenus Niedzwedzkia. Unlike other species of the genus, it has winged capsules and septifragal dehiscence.

== Cultivation ==
The plant demands well drained dry soil in a warm position exposed to full sun; it is hardy to -15 °C.

=== Accessions ===
- Tashkent Botanical Garden.

Institut of Botany and Phytointroduction, Almaty
