= Incarvillateine =

Names
- Preferred IUPAC name Bis[(4R,4aS,6R,7S,7aR)-2,4,7-trimethyloctahydro-1H-cyclopenta[c]pyridin-6-yl] (1R,2R,3S,4S)-2,4-bis(4-hydroxy-3-methoxyphenyl)cyclobutane-1,3-dicarboxylate

Identifiers
| CAS Number | 129748-10-3 |
| 3D model (JSmol) | Interactive image |
| ChEMBL | ChEMBL505819 |
| ChemSpider | 24712075 |
| PubChem CID | 9875096 |
- InChI: InChI=1S/C42H58N2O8/c1-21-17-43(5)19-29-23(3)33(15-27(21)29)51-41(47)39-37(25-9-11-31(45)35(13-25)49-7)40(38(39)26-10-12-32(46)36(14-26)50-8)42(48)52-34-16-28-22(2)18-44(6)20-30(28)24(34)4/h9-14,21-24,27-30,33-34,37-40,45-46H,15-20H2,1-8H3/t21-,22-,23-,24-,27-,28-,29-,30-,33+,34+,37-,38-,39-,40-/m0/s1 Key: VQKTZIKAARDZIA-FYBVMHBNSA-N
- SMILES: C[C@@H]1[C@H]2[C@H]([C@@H]([C@@H](C2)OC(=O)[C@H]3[C@@H]([C@@H]([C@H]3c4cc(c(cc4)O)OC)C(=O)O[C@H]5[C@H]([C@H]6[C@@H](C5)[C@H](CN(C6)C)C)C)c7cc(c(cc7)O)OC)C)CN(C1)C

Properties
| Chemical formula | C_{42}H_{58}N_{2}O_{8} |
| Molar mass | 718.932 g·mol^{−1} |
- Except where otherwise noted, data are given for materials in their standard state (at 25 °C [77 °F], 100 kPa). Infobox references

Incarvillateine is a complex monoterpene alkaloid that is a derivative of α-truxillic acid. It can be isolated from the plant genus Incarvillea.

== Biological activity ==
=== Opioidergic ===
Incarvillateine isolated from Incarvillea sinensis has demonstrated significant analgesic activity when compared to the opiate alkaloid morphine.

Incarvillateine's pain-killing effect was partially blocked by administration of naloxone, norbinaltorphimine and beta-funaltrexamine, which are receptor antagonists with varying selectivity for mu and kappa opioid receptors. Naltrindole, a delta opioid receptor antagonist, did not counteract the analgesic activity of incarvillateine.

These findings indicate that incarvillateine may possess opioidergic receptor activity, but it is worthy to note that some studies indicate that naloxone was ineffective at countering incarvillateine's analgesic activity.

=== Adenosinergic ===
Incarvillateine's antinociceptive effect was blocked by the administration of adenosine receptor antagonists such as theophylline. This suggests that incarvillateine's main mechanism of action is mediated through the adenosine receptor.
