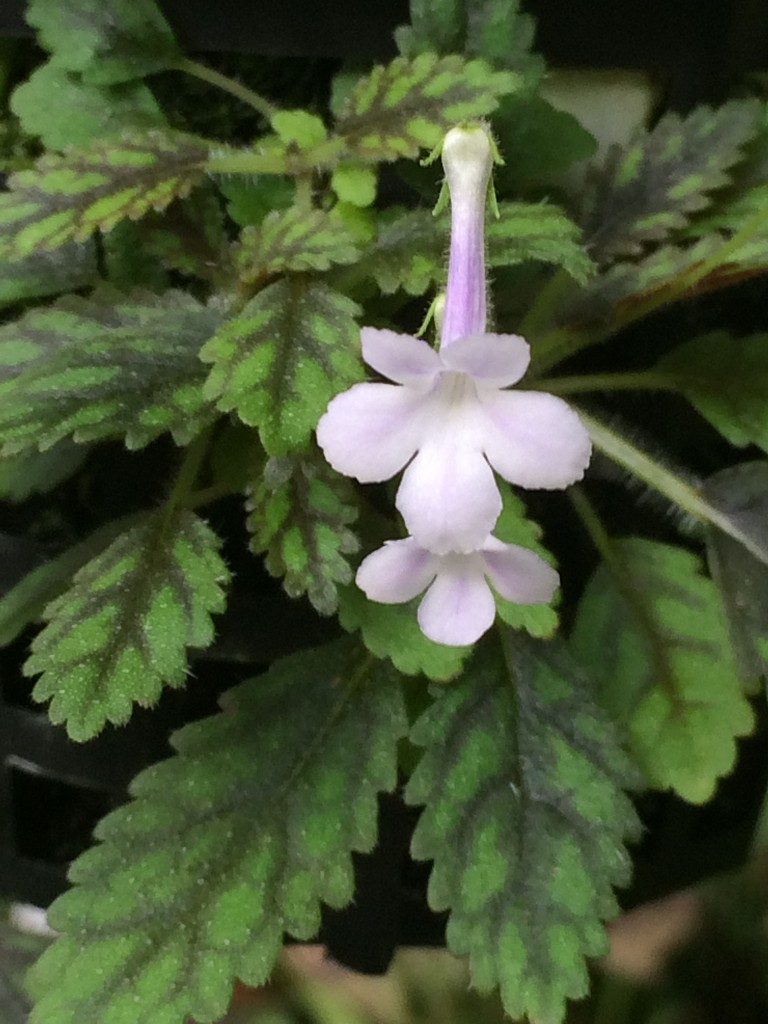

Scientific classification
- Kingdom: Plantae
- Clade: Tracheophytes
- Clade: Angiosperms
- Clade: Eudicots
- Clade: Asterids
- Order: Lamiales
- Family: Gesneriaceae
- Genus: Sinningia
- Species: S. muscicola

Binomial name
- Sinningia muscicola Chautems, T.Lopes & M.Peixoto

= Sinningia muscicola =

Species of flowering plant

Sinningia muscicola, formerly referred to as Sinningia sp. "Rio das Pedras", is a small tuberous species within the genus Sinningia and part of the flowering plant family Gesneriaceae.

The plants produce small, bright lavender flowers and have oval serrated leaves with dark green colouration around the veins.

Cultural requirements are similar to the related African violets, except that S. muscicola generally requires a more humid environment.
