= Sinningia araneosa =

Scientific classification
- Kingdom: Plantae
- Clade: Tracheophytes
- Clade: Angiosperms
- Clade: Eudicots
- Clade: Asterids
- Order: Lamiales
- Family: Gesneriaceae
- Genus: Sinningia
- Species: S. araneosa

Binomial name
- Sinningia araneosa Chautems (1997)

Synonyms
- Corytholoma pusillum Fritsch (1900); Rechsteineria pusilla Fritsch (1913)

Species of flowering plant

Sinningia araneosa is a flowering plant in the family Gesneriaceae. It is a tuberous geophyte endemic to southeastern Brazil, where it grows in the states of Minas Gerais and São Paulo.
