= Truxillic acid =

Names
- IUPAC name 7,8′-Cyclo-8,7′-neolignane-9,9′-dioic acid
- Systematic IUPAC name 2,4-Diphenylcyclobutane-1,3-dicarboxylic acid

Identifiers
CAS Number	4462-95-7
3D model (JSmol)	Interactive image
ChEMBL	ChEMBL1098368
ChemSpider	70589
ECHA InfoCard	100.022.478
EC Number	224-724-3
PubChem CID	78213
UNII	821BB4R21V
CompTox Dashboard (EPA)	DTXSID20196252
- InChI: InChI=1S/C18H16O4/c19-17(20)15-13(11-7-3-1-4-8-11)16(18(21)22)14(15)12-9-5-2-6-10-12/h1-10,13-16H,(H,19,20)(H,21,22) Key: QWFRRFLKWRIKSZ-UHFFFAOYSA-N
- SMILES: OC(C1C(C2=CC=CC=C2)C(C(O)=O)C1C3=CC=CC=C3)=O

Properties
Chemical formula	C_{18}H_{16}O_{4}
Molar mass	296.322 g·mol^{−1}

Hazards
- GHS labelling
Pictograms	(GHS06: Toxic)
Signal word	Danger
Hazard statements	H301, H315, H319, H335
Precautionary statements	P261, P264, P264+P265, P270, P271, P280, P301+P316, P302+P352, P304+P340, P305+P351+P338, P319, P321, P330, P332+P317, P337+P317, P362+P364, P403+P233, P405, P501
- Except where otherwise noted, data are given for materials in their standard state (at 25 °C [77 °F], 100 kPa). Infobox references

Truxillic acids are any of several crystalline stereoisomeric cyclic dicarboxylic acids with the formula (C_{6}H_{5}C_{2}H_{2}(CO_{2}H)_{2}. They are colorless solids. These compounds are obtained by the [2 + 2] photocycloadditions of cinnamic acid where the two trans alkenes react head-to-tail. The isolated stereoisomers are called truxillic acids. The preparation of truxillic acids provided an early example of organic photochemistry.

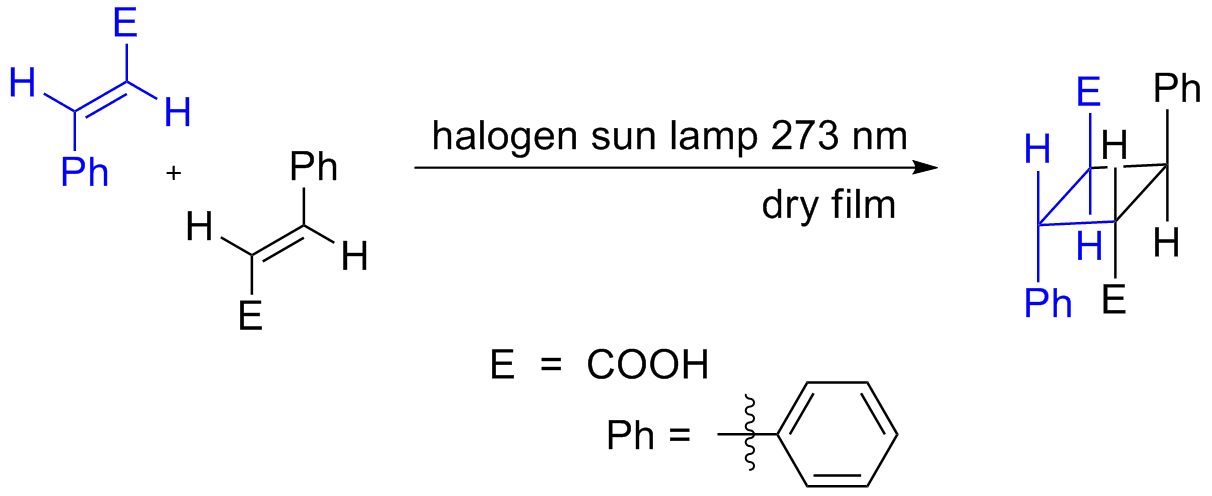
Cinnamic Acid CycloAddition

== Occurrence and reactions ==
These compounds are found in a variety of plants, for example in coca. Incarvillateine, an alkaloid from the plant Incarvillea sinensis, is a derivative of α-truxillic acid.

Upon heating, truxillic acids undergo cracking to give cinnamic acid.

== Isomers ==
Truxillic acid can exist in five stereoisomers.

Truxillic acid isomers
Isomer	a	b	c	d	e	f
α-truxillic acid (cocaic acid)	COOH	H	H	C_{6}H_{5}	H	COOH
γ-truxillic acid	COOH	H	H	C_{6}H_{5}	COOH	H
ε-truxillic acid	H	COOH	C_{6}H_{5}	H	H	COOH
peri-truxillic acid	COOH	H	C_{6}H_{5}	H	COOH	H
epi-truxillic acid	COOH	H	C_{6}H_{5}	H	H	COOH

Below are the five stereoisomers of truxillic acid, called alpha, gamma, epsilon, peri, and epi. These are shown both in a 2D skeletal diagram with stereocenters indicated and a 3D rendering of the structural geometry of the isomers themselves.

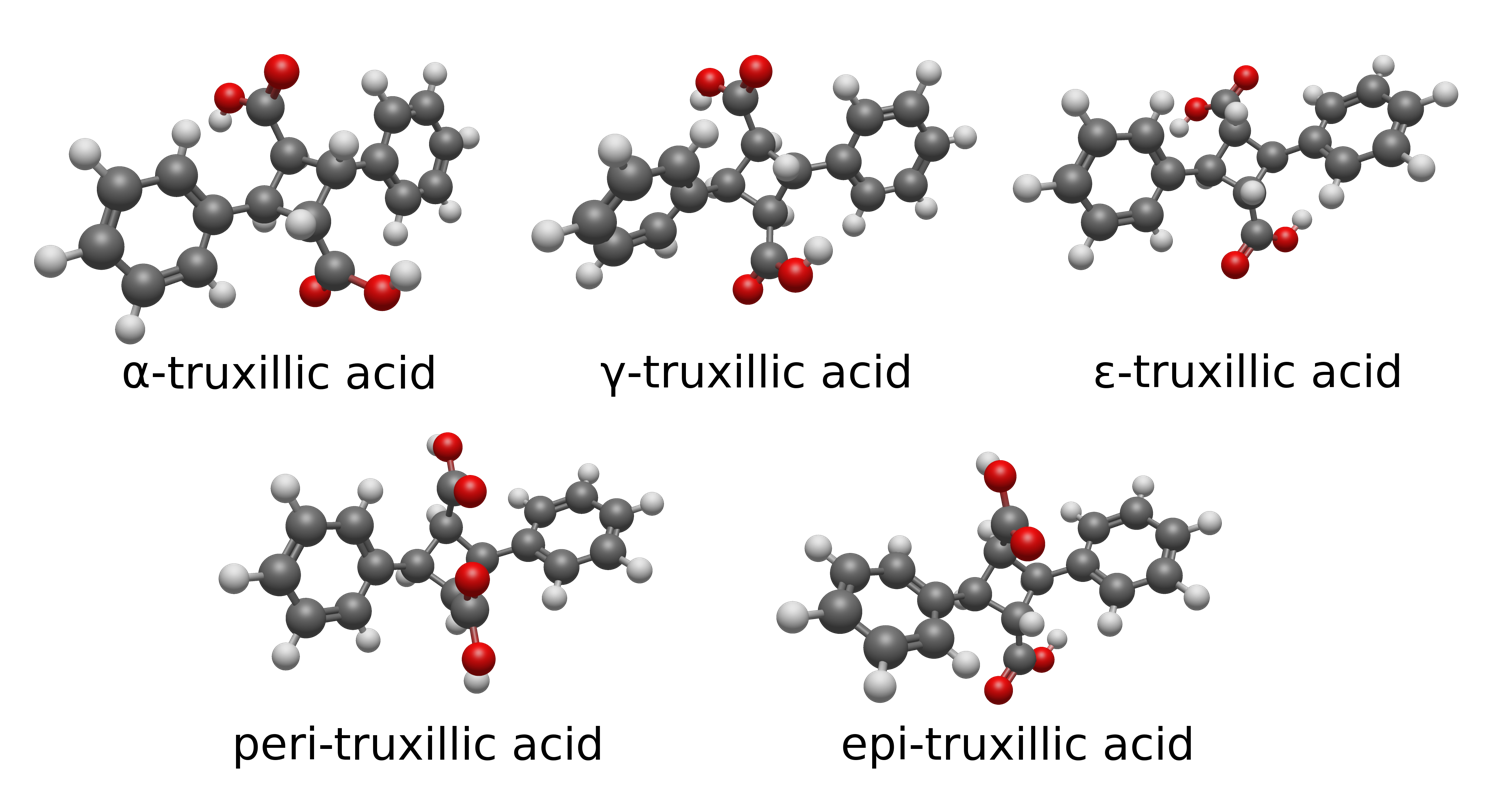

== See also ==
- Truxinic acids are isomers of the truxillic acids with phenyl groups on adjacent methyne centers.
