= Sinningia canastrensis =

Scientific classification
- Kingdom: Plantae
- Clade: Tracheophytes
- Clade: Angiosperms
- Clade: Eudicots
- Clade: Asterids
- Order: Lamiales
- Family: Gesneriaceae
- Genus: Sinningia
- Species: S. canastrensis

Binomial name
- Sinningia canastrensis Chautems et al., 2010

Species of flowering plant

Sinningia canastrensis is a tuberous member of the flowering plant family Gesneriaceae. It is found in Brazil.
