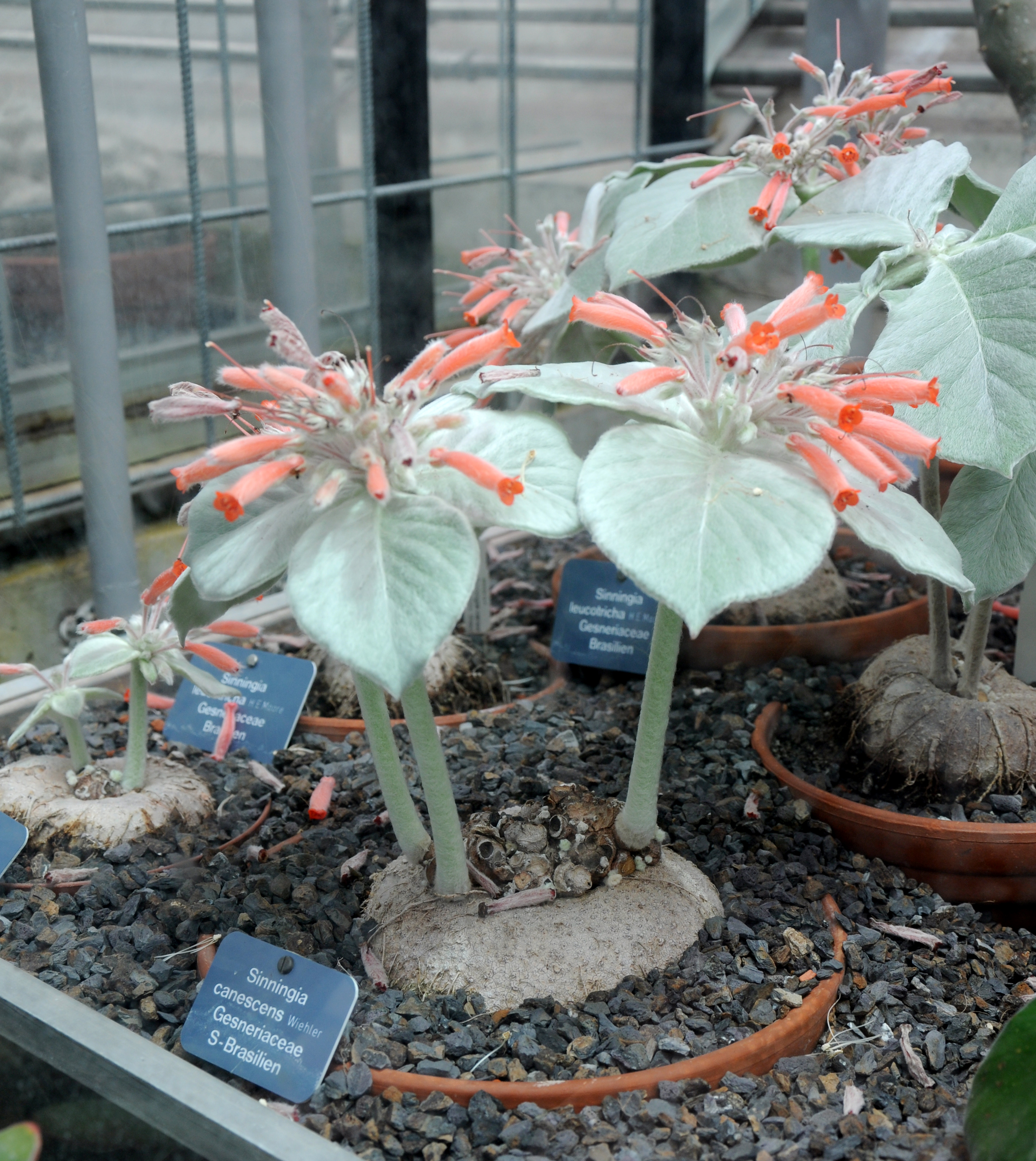
- In bloom

Scientific classification
- Kingdom: Plantae
- Clade: Embryophytes
- Clade: Tracheophytes
- Clade: Spermatophytes
- Clade: Angiosperms
- Clade: Eudicots
- Clade: Asterids
- Order: Lamiales
- Family: Gesneriaceae
- Genus: Sinningia
- Species: S. canescens

Binomial name
- Sinningia canescens (Mart.) Wiehler

Synonyms
- List: Corytholoma canescens (Mart.) Fritsch; Rechsteineria canescens Kuntze; Rechsteineria canescens var. macrophylla Hoehne; Rechsteineria canescens var. obovata Hoehne

= Sinningia canescens =

Species of flowering plant

Sinningia canescens, called the Brazilian edelweiss, is a species of flowering plant in the genus Sinningia, native to southeastern and southern Brazil. A tuberous perennial reaching 30 cm (12 in), it has gained the Royal Horticultural Society's Award of Garden Merit as a hothouse ornamental.
