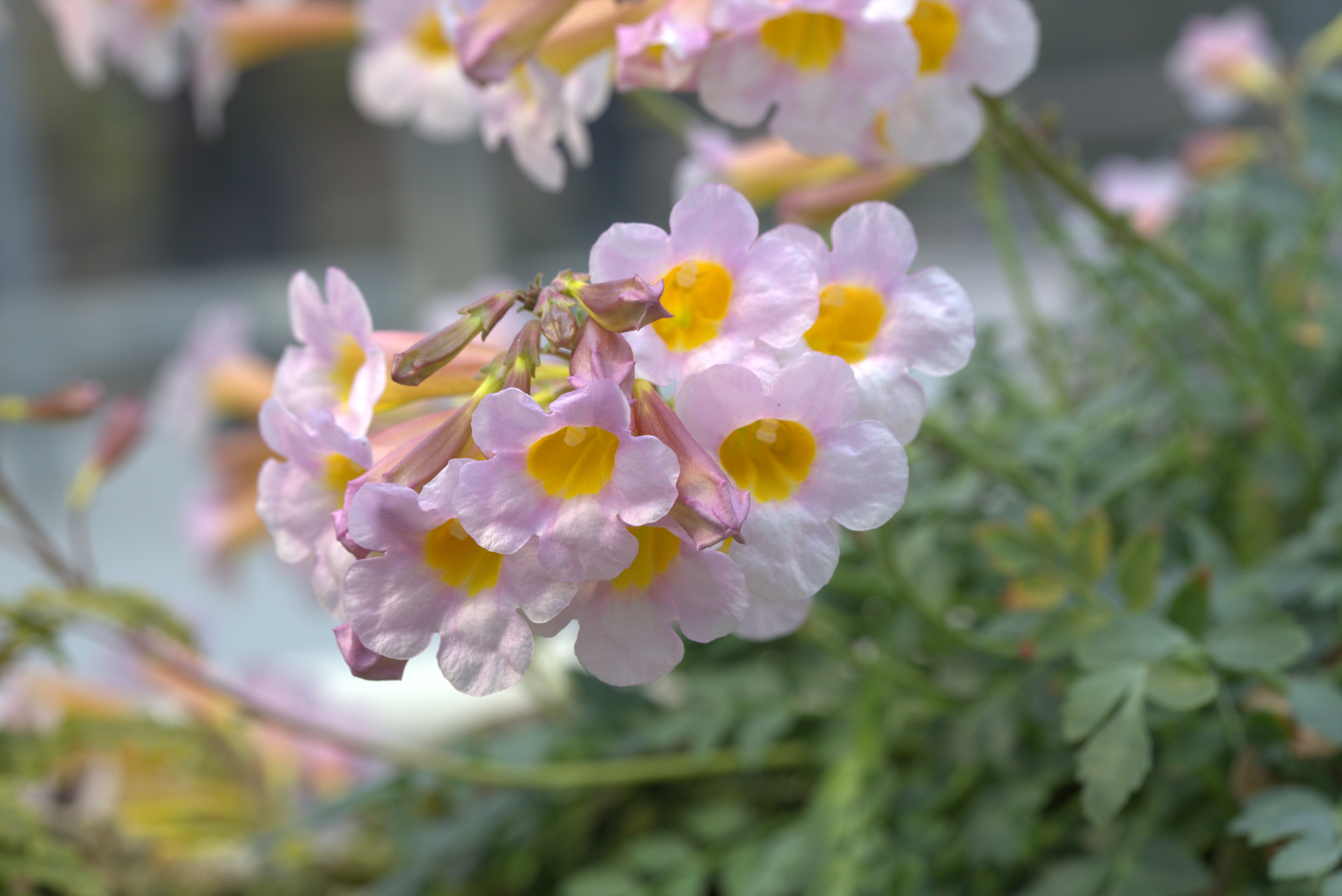

Scientific classification
- Kingdom: Plantae
- Clade: Embryophytes
- Clade: Tracheophytes
- Clade: Angiosperms
- Clade: Eudicots
- Clade: Asterids
- Order: Lamiales
- Family: Bignoniaceae
- Genus: Incarvillea
- Species: I. emodi

Binomial name
- Incarvillea emodi (Royle ex Lindl.) Chatterjee

Synonyms
- Amphicome emodi Royle ex Lindl.

= Incarvillea emodi =

Species of plant

Incarvillea emodi, also known as the Himalayan trumpet flower, is a plant natively found in Western Himalayas in the lower forests found in temperate and subtropical moist broadleaf forests.

== Description ==
The stem is around 50 cm tall with 6 to 8 pinkish purple flowers that are yellowish orange from the inside with rounded petals. The leaves are clustered at the base.

== Distribution ==
This species is found in the Himalayan regions of Pakistan, India and western Nepal as well as in eastern Afghanistan mainly in rock crevices. They live mainly between 600 and 2500 m above sea level.
