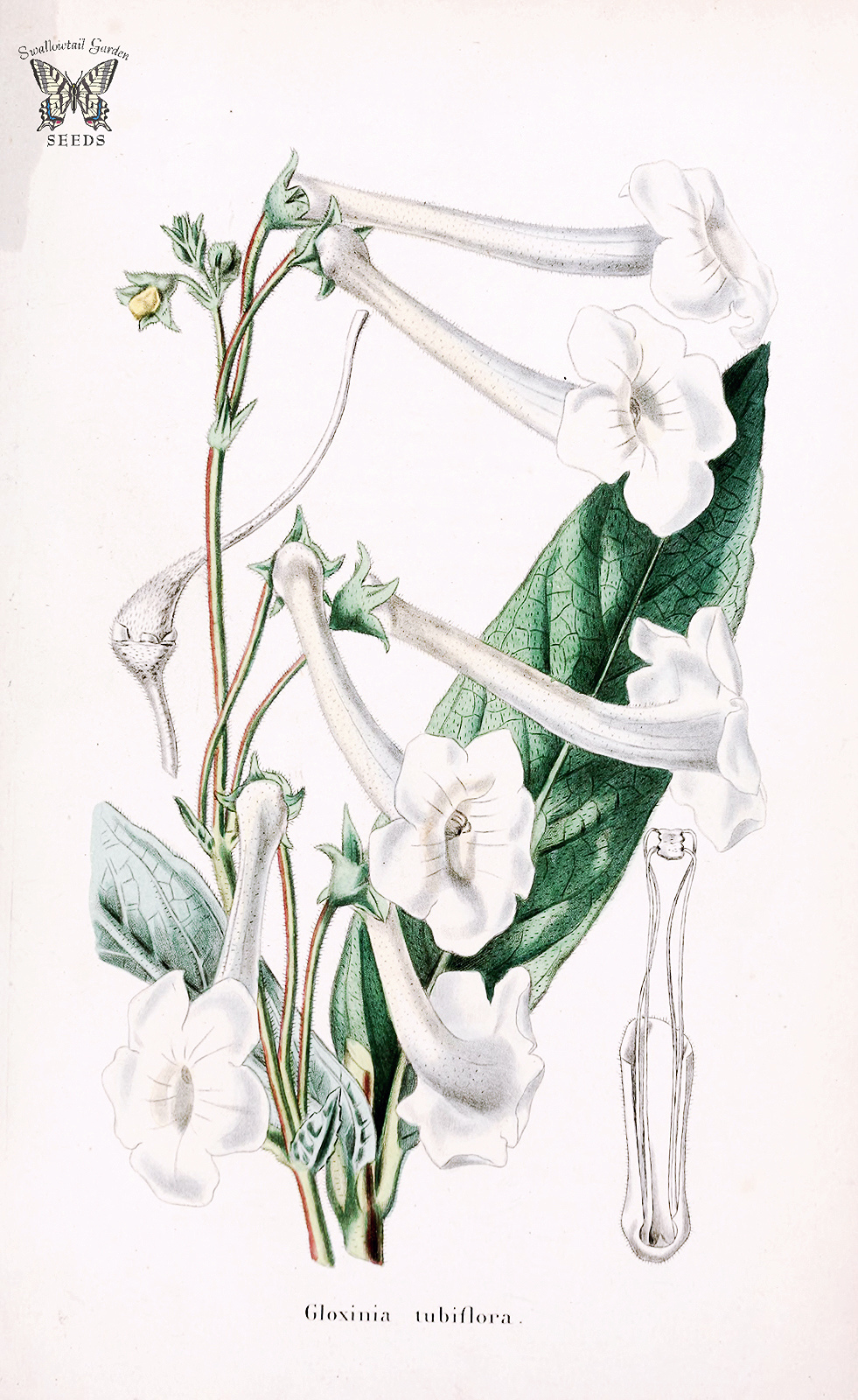

Scientific classification
- Kingdom: Plantae
- Clade: Tracheophytes
- Clade: Angiosperms
- Clade: Eudicots
- Clade: Asterids
- Order: Lamiales
- Family: Gesneriaceae
- Genus: Sinningia
- Species: S. tubiflora

Binomial name
- Sinningia tubiflora (Hook.) Fritsch

= Sinningia tubiflora =

Species of plant

Sinningia tubiflora, the trumpet-flowered sinningia, is a species of flowering plant in the family Gesneriaceae, native to Argentina, Paraguay and Uruguay in South America.

Growing to 30 cm (12 in) tall and broad, this tuberous, mound-forming herbaceous perennial has silver-green leaves. The reddish stems appear in summer. Up to 60 cm (24 in), they bear narrowly cylindrical white flowers, flared at the tips. The flowers may be 7 cm (2.8 in) long, and are slightly scented.

This plant is grown as an ornamental, for a sheltered spot (minimum temperature −5 °C (23 °F)) in sun or partial shade. It prefers a neutral or acid soil.

== Synonyms ==
Plants of the World Online lists six synonyms:

- Achimenes tubiflora (Hook.) Britton
- Dolichodeira tubiflora (Hook.) Hanst.
- Gesneria tubiflora Endl.
- Gesneria tubiflora Griseb.
- Gloxinia tubiflora Hook.
- Houttea tubiflora Heynh.
