= Vladislav E. Niedzwiecki =

Russian naturalist

Niedzwiecki in Turkestan

Vladislav E. Niedzwiecki (also spelled Niedzwetsky and Niedzwetzky) (1855–1918) was a Russian lawyer and amateur naturalist of Polish descent.

Born in Mogilev Province, Niedzwiecki graduated from the University of Kazan and settled in (one source states 'exiled to') Vernoe (now Almaty, Kazakhstan) in 1884, initially working as a lawyer before becoming the Acting Secretary of the Statistics Committee, at Semirechensk. A keen amateur naturalist, he sent many specimens of flora and fauna to research bodies in Moscow and St Petersburg, and in 1901 became Custodian and Trustee of the Semerichye Vernoe Museum. He also sent seeds to Georg Dieck at the Zöschen Arboretum, Germany, notably of the red-fleshed apple, Malus niedzwetzkyana and the Siberian Elm Ulmus pumila.

Niedzwiecki died in 1918, rumoured to have been shot in the aftermath of the Russian Revolution.

== Eponymy ==
Niedzwiecki is commemorated by the apple Malus niedzwetzkyana, and also by the perennial flower Niedzwedzkia semiretschenskia.
