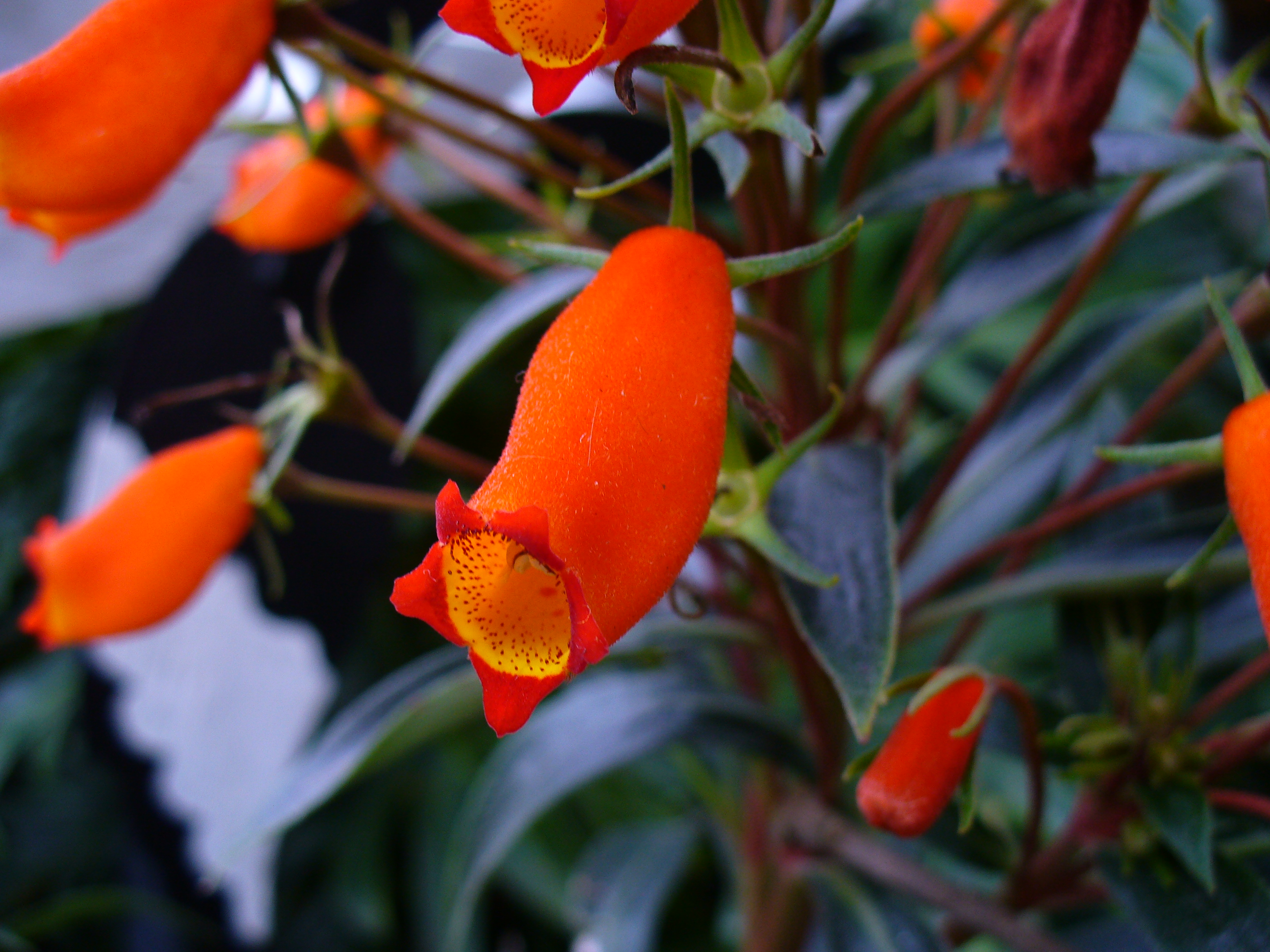
- Seemannia sylvatica

Scientific classification
- Kingdom: Plantae
- Clade: Tracheophytes
- Clade: Angiosperms
- Clade: Eudicots
- Clade: Asterids
- Order: Lamiales
- Family: Gesneriaceae
- Genus: Seemannia; Regel (1855), nom. cons.

Species
- See text

Synonyms
- Fritschiantha Kuntze (1898)

= Seemannia =

Genus of flowering plants

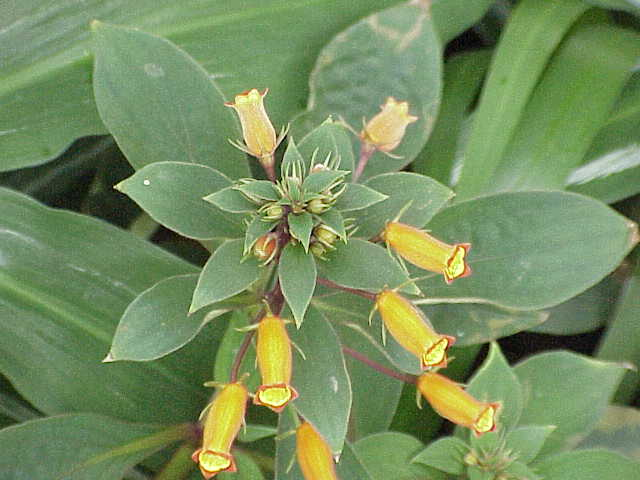
Seemannia sylvatica, yellow-flowered form

Seemannia is a New World genus in the flowering plant family Gesneriaceae. There are four species in the genus, primarily found in the Andean regions of South America. The name honors the German botanist Berthold Carl Seemann.

== Taxonomic history ==
Seemannia was created in 1855 by Regel for the species Seemannia ternifolia (now considered a synonym of S. sylvatica). In 1976 Seemannia was synonymized under the genus Gloxinia by gesneriad specialist Hans Wiehler but has more recently been revived following phylogenetic and morphological research on relationships of Gloxinia and related genera, which suggested that Wiehler's generic concept of Gloxinia was overly broad and polyphyletic. Although now recognized as a separate genus, Seemannia is closely related to Gloxinia and hybrids between the two genera are fertile although the two genera are very distinct morphologically.

Although all of the species occur in the Andes, Seemannia purpurascens is unusual in having a disjunct distribution, with populations in northern South America (Guyana, French Guiana, and northern Brazil) widely separated from Andean populations in southern Peru and Bolivia.

== Species ==
Four species are accepted.

- Seemannia gymnostoma (Griseb.) Toursark. – southern Peru, Bolivia, northern Argentina
- Seemannia nematanthodes (Kuntze) K.Schum. – Bolivia, northern Argentina
- Seemannia purpurascens Rusby – southern Peru, Bolivia, Guyana, French Guiana, northern Brazil
- Seemannia sylvatica (Kunth) Hanst. – Peru, Bolivia, northern Argentina, Paraguay, southern Brazil
