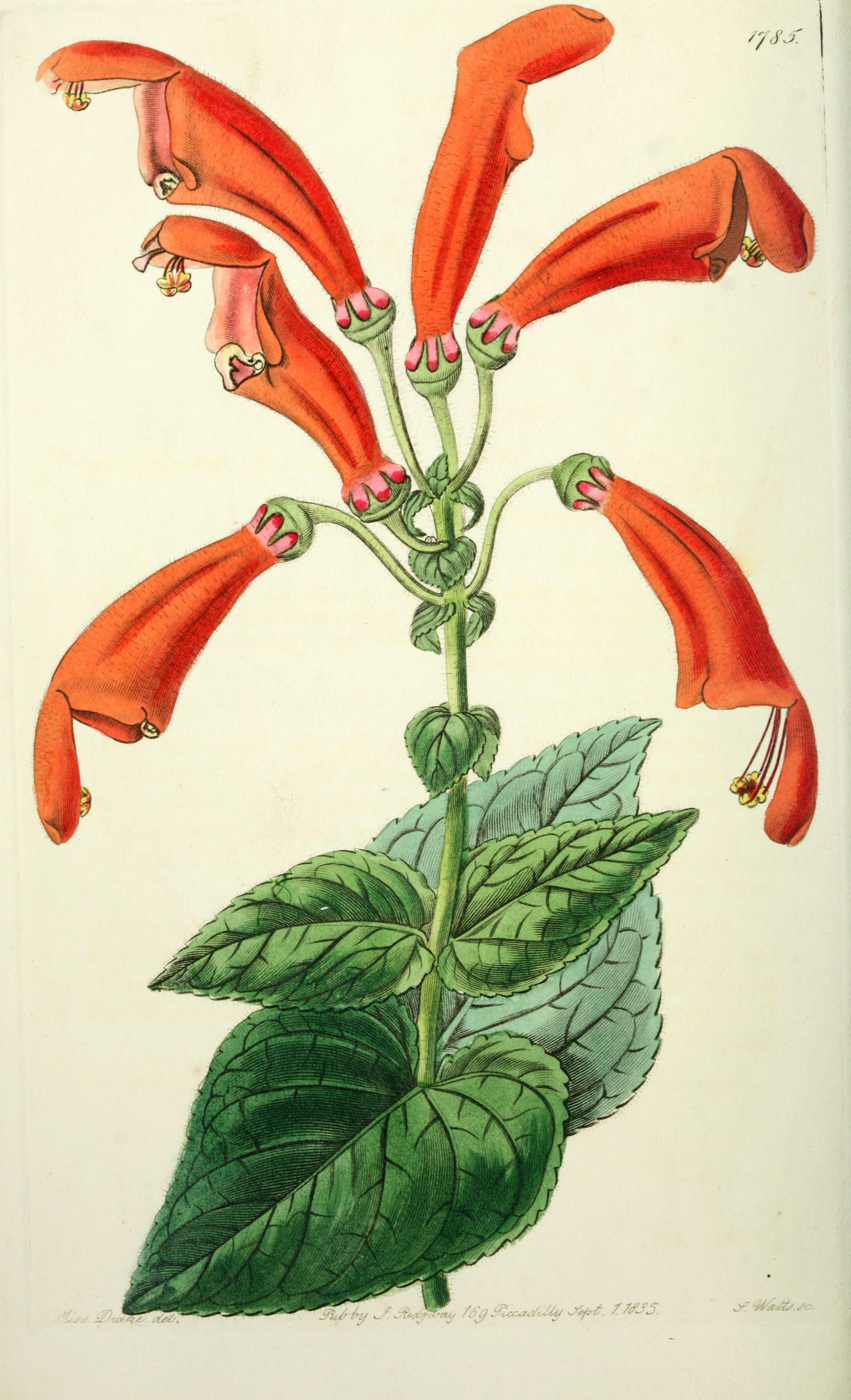

Scientific classification
- Kingdom: Plantae
- Clade: Embryophytes
- Clade: Tracheophytes
- Clade: Angiosperms
- Clade: Eudicots
- Clade: Asterids
- Order: Lamiales
- Family: Gesneriaceae
- Genus: Sinningia
- Species: S. bulbosa

Binomial name
- Sinningia bulbosa (Ker Gawl.) Wiehler (1978)

Synonyms
- Synonymy: Coptocheile macrorrhiza Hoffmanns. (1842); Corytholoma bulbosum (Ker Gawl.) Voss (1894); Dircaea bulbosa (Ker Gawl.) Decne. (1848); Dircaea bulbosa subvar. alba Planch. (1856); Dircaea fascialis (Hook.) Decne. (1848); Dircaea suttonii (Booth ex Lindl.) Decne. (1848); Dircaea vauthieri (DC.) Decne. (1848); Gesneria affinis Hanst. (1864); Gesneria bulbosa Ker Gawl. (1819) (basionym); Gesneria bulbosa var. dentata (Hornsch.) Klotzsch (1842); Gesneria bulbosa var. faucialis (Lindl.) Klotzsch (1842); Gesneria bulbosa var. lateritia Hook. (1846); Gesneria bulbosa var. macrorhiza (Dumort.) Klotzsch (1842); Gesneria bulbosa var. splendens Klotzsch (1842); Gesneria bulbosa var. suttonii (Booth ex Lindl.) Klotzsch (1842); Gesneria cynocephala Drapiez (1836); Gesneria dentata Hornsch. (1834); Gesneria fascialis Hook. (1838); Gesneria faucialis Lindl. (1835); Gesneria lobulata Hanst. (1864); Gesneria macrorhiza Dumort. (1836); Gesneria suttonii Booth ex Lindl. (1834); Gesneria vauthieri DC. (1839); Megapleilis tuberosa Raf. (1837); Rechsteineria bulbosa Kuntze (1891); Rechsteineria dentata Kuntze (1891); Rechsteineria faucialis Kuntze (1891); Rechsteineria macrorhiza Kuntze (1891); Rechsteineria suttonii Kuntze (1891); Rechsteineria vauthieri Kuntze (1891); Sinningia macrorhiza (Dumort.) Wiehler (1975)

= Sinningia bulbosa =

Species of flowering plant

Sinningia bulbosa is a species of flowering plant belonging to the family Gesneriaceae. It is a tuberous geophyte native to southeastern Brazil.

== Description ==
A very brief description published in 1842 describes the plant as resembling the genus Gesneria, with the flower having an elongated upper lip and an obliquely truncated lower lip comprising three small divisions, the middle smallest, the lateral ones slightly more prominent. The anthers are joined to an eight-lobed disc.

== Taxonomy ==
The species was first described as Gesneria bulbosa in 1819. In 1978 it was placed in genus Sinningia.

The species is known by many synonyms. Among them are Coptocheile macrorhiza, described in 1842 by Karl Nägel as the sole species of genus Coptocheile, who attributed the name to Johann Centurius Hoffmannsegg in a 31 page appendix (Nachtrag) to Verzeichniss der Pflanzenkulturen in den Grafl. Hoffmannseggischen Garten zu Dresden und Rammenau for 1841, also published in 1842. Coptocheile was placed in the family Gesneriaceae. In the APG IV system, the genus is treated as incertae sedis, with the remark that it may belong in Gesneriaceae but "may belong elsewhere in Lamiales". Neither the genus name nor the species appear in a 2020 key to the genera of the family Gesneriaceae, nor in a 2020 index to the names of New World members of the family Gesneriaceae. Plants of the World Online treats Coptocheile macrorhiza as a synonym of Sinningia bulbosa.
