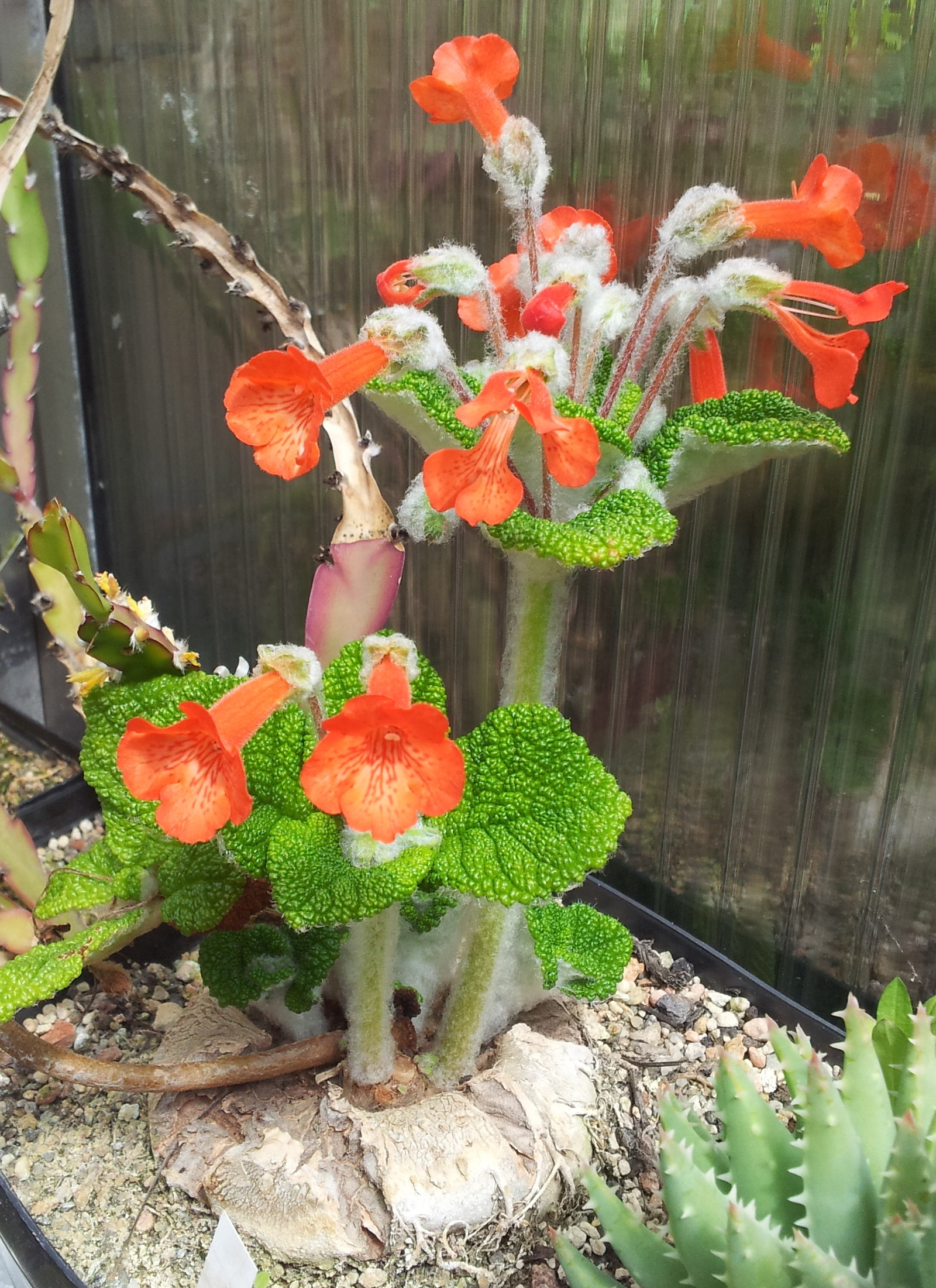
- Showing tuber and growth habit

Scientific classification
- Kingdom: Plantae
- Clade: Tracheophytes
- Clade: Angiosperms
- Clade: Eudicots
- Clade: Asterids
- Order: Lamiales
- Family: Gesneriaceae
- Genus: Sinningia
- Species: S. bullata

Binomial name
- Sinningia bullata Chautems et al., 2010

= Sinningia bullata =

Species of flowering plant

Sinningia bullata is a tuberous member of the flowering plant family Gesneriaceae. It produces small orange-red flowers and is found in Brazil. It is named for its bullate leaves, and also produces a woolly backing to its leaves.

== Hybrids ==
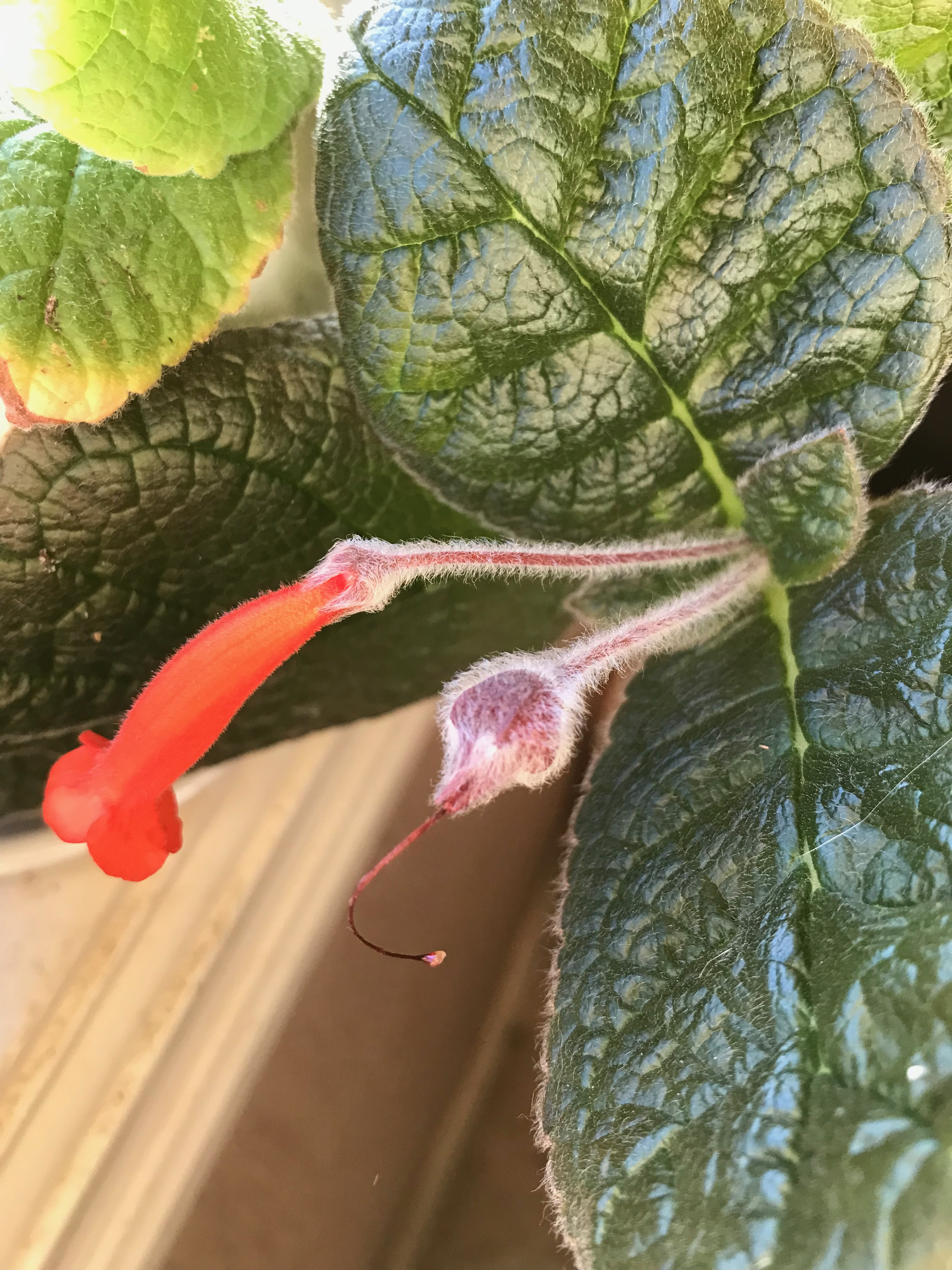
Sinningia bullata x S. leucotricha, flower and young fruit
