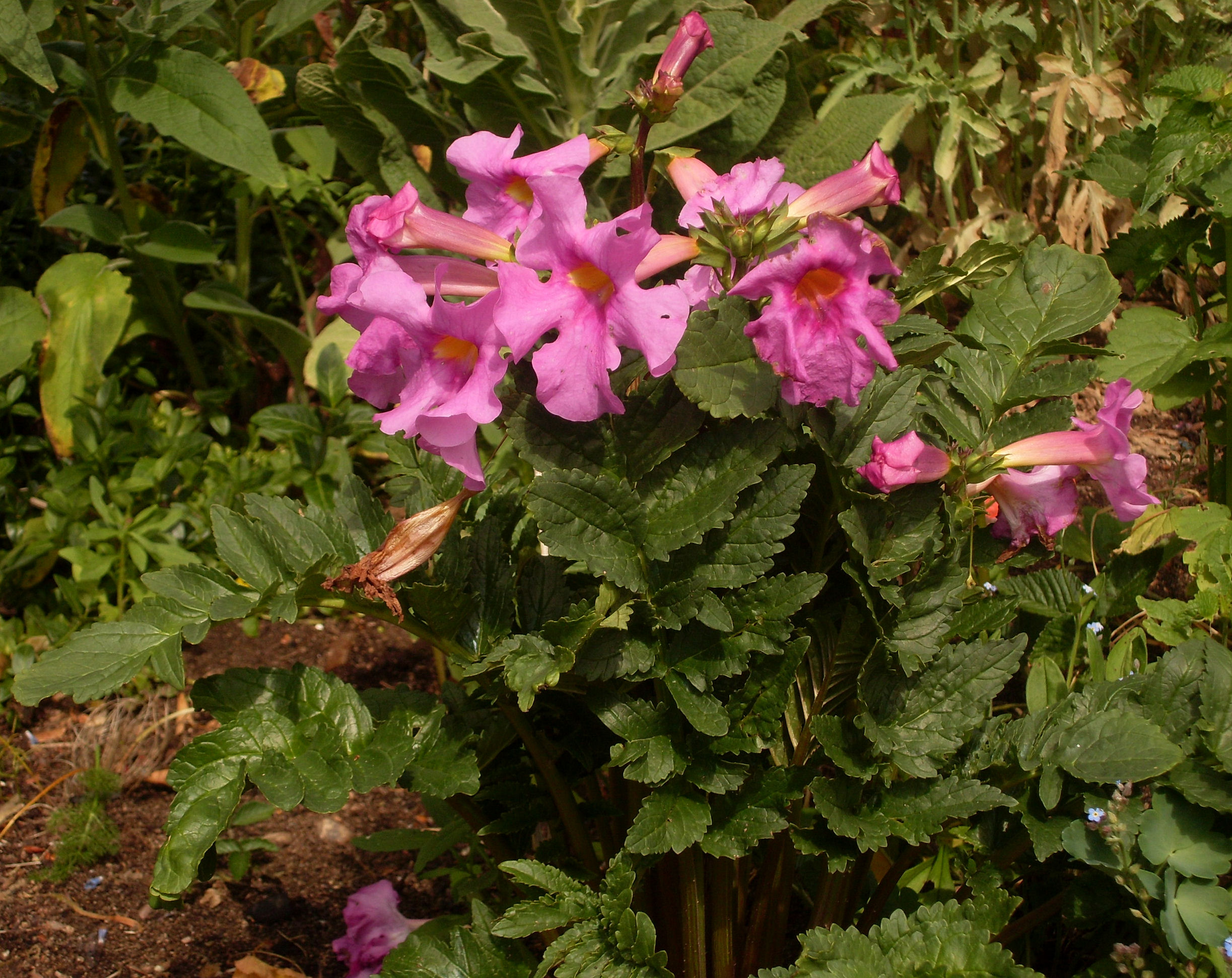
- In southern Sweden in June
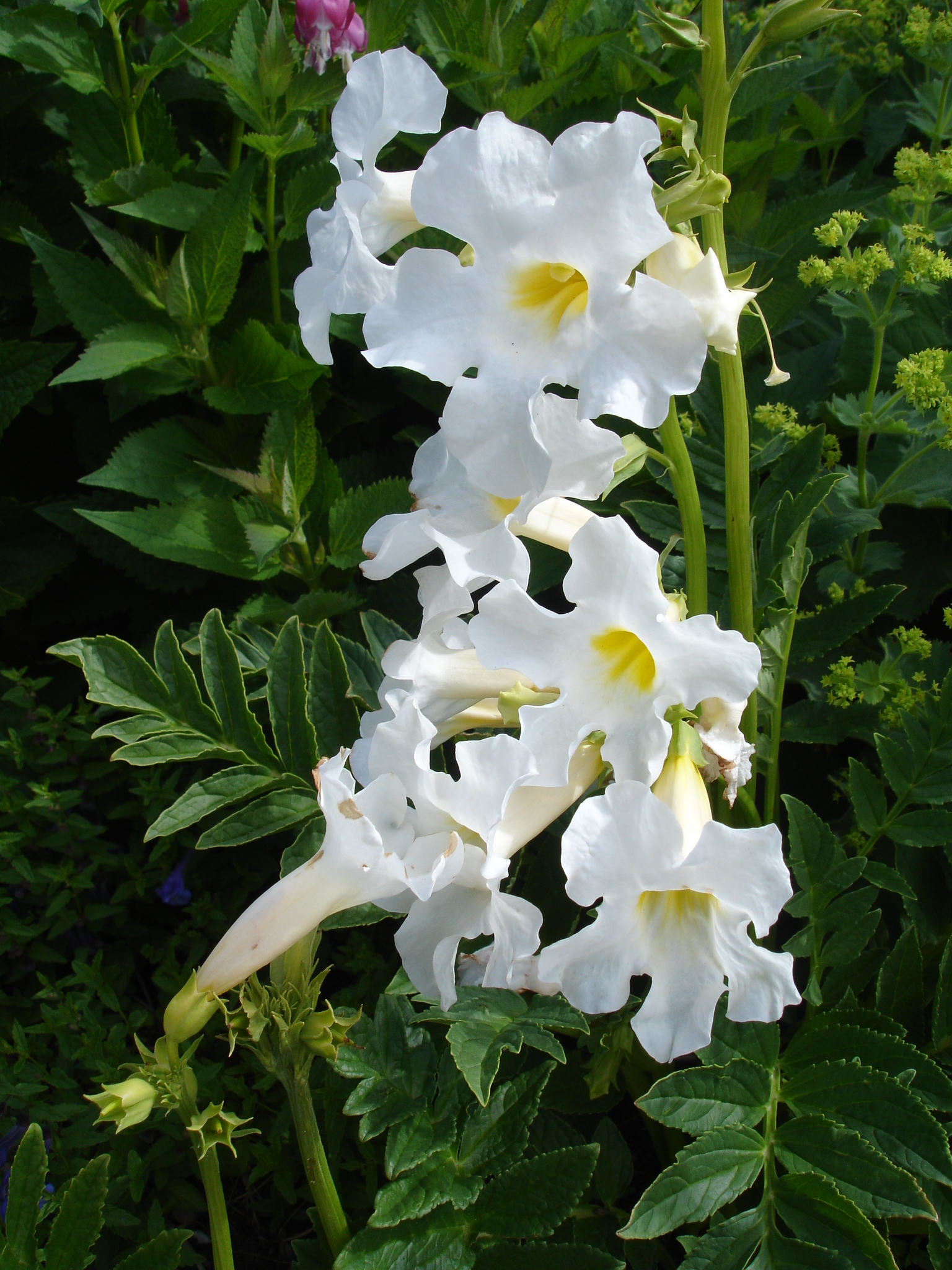
- 'Snowtop' cultivar

Scientific classification
- Kingdom: Plantae
- Clade: Tracheophytes
- Clade: Angiosperms
- Clade: Eudicots
- Clade: Asterids
- Order: Lamiales
- Family: Bignoniaceae
- Genus: Incarvillea
- Species: I. delavayi

Binomial name
- Incarvillea delavayi Bureau & Franch.

= Incarvillea delavayi =

Species of flowering plant

Incarvillea delavayi, the so‑called hardy gloxinia or flowering fern, is a species of flowering plant in the family Bignoniaceae, native to western Sichuan and northwest Yunnan provinces of China. The true Gloxinia are members of the Gesneriaceae, while true ferns are flowerless plants which reproduce through spores.

A slug‑prone perennial with fern‑like leaves, it is hardy in USDA zones 5b through 7, and is recommended for borders and rock gardens in part shade to full sun. The original species and a number of cultivars are commercially available, including 'Bees Pink' and 'Snowtop'.

== Description ==
This herbaceous perennial reaches a height of 40 to 60 cm (16 to 24 inches) and spreads to a similar width. It forms thickened underground storage structures that function as energy reserves, resembling the knobby tubers of dahlias. These tuberous roots enable the plant to withstand periods of dormancy and regenerate with vigor each growing season.

The foliage consists of deep green, finely divided leaves arranged in a pinnate pattern. Each leaf can grow up to 45 cm (18 inches) long, giving the plant a lush, textured appearance. These leaves emerge from an elongated flower stalk that may extend to 60 cm (24 inches) in height. Due to its gracefully dissected foliage, the plant is sometimes referred to as a flowering fern, although it is not related to true ferns.

=== Flowers ===
The plant produces trumpet-shaped flowers up to 8 cm (3.2 inches) wide, blooming in white or pink with a yellow center. Flowering takes place from June to July.
