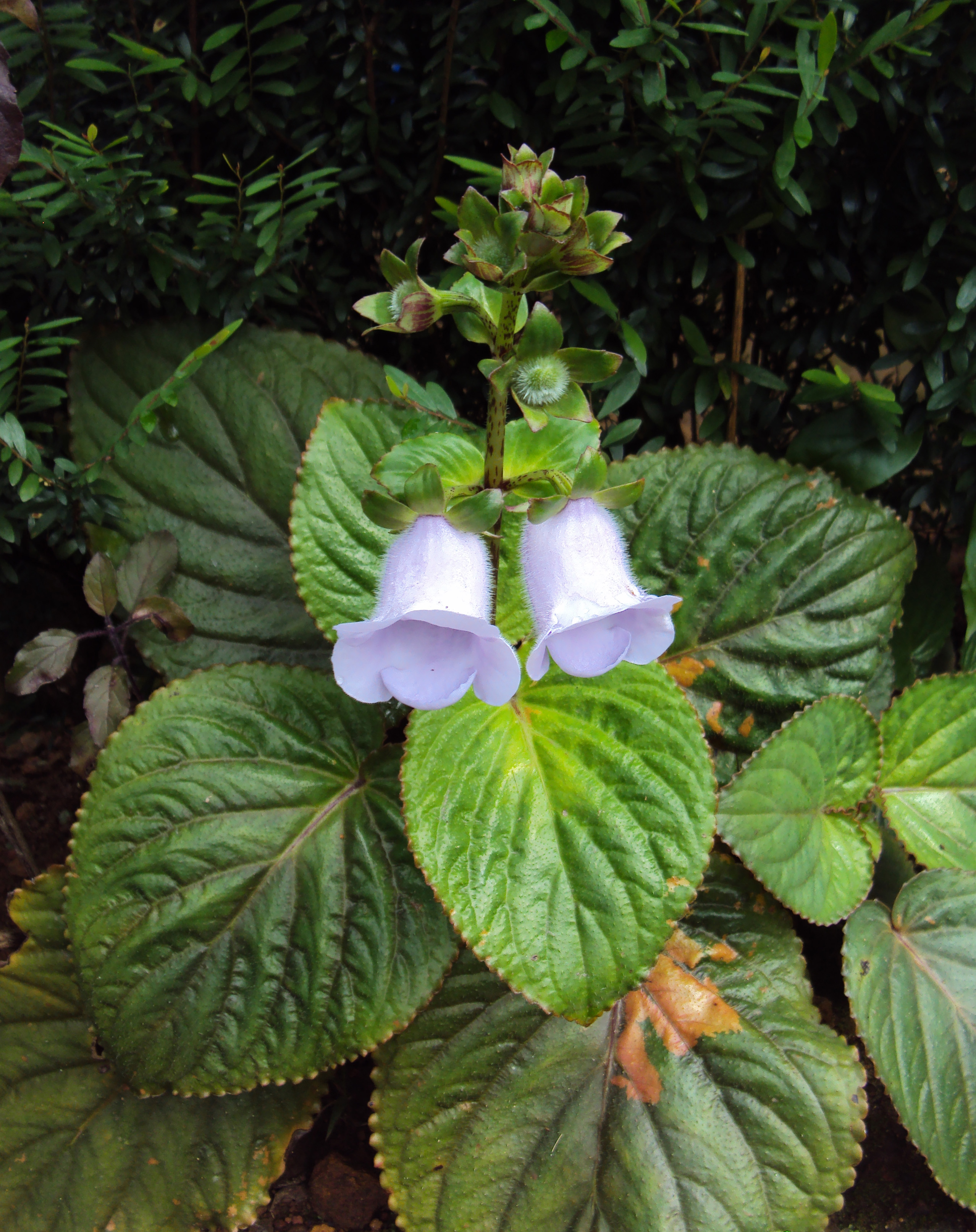
- Gloxinia perennis

Scientific classification
- Kingdom: Plantae
- Clade: Embryophytes
- Clade: Tracheophytes
- Clade: Angiosperms
- Clade: Eudicots
- Clade: Asterids
- Order: Lamiales
- Family: Gesneriaceae
- Genus: Gloxinia; L'Hér. (1789)

Species
- 5; see text

Synonyms
- Anodiscus Benth. (1876); Escheria Regel (1849); Eucolum Salisb. (1796); Fiebrigia Fritsch (1913); Koellikeria Regel (1848); Salisia Regel (1849)

= Gloxinia (genus) =

Genus of flowering plants

Gloxinia is a genus containing three species of tropical rhizomatous herbs in the flowering plant family Gesneriaceae. The species are primarily found in the Andes of South America, but Gloxinia perennis is also found in Central America and the West Indies, where it has probably escaped from cultivation.

Gloxinia perennis is the original (type) species of the genus, and for much of its history the genus consisted of only G. perennis and a very small number of other species. The classification of Gloxinia later changed to reflect the 1976 classification of Hans Wiehler, who took a broader view of the genus. A recent analysis of Gloxinia and related genera based on molecular and morphological work has determined that Wiehler's circumscription of the genus was unnatural, both phylogenetically and morphologically. The analyses demonstrated that the genera Anodiscus and Koellikeria, each with a single species, were more closely related to Gloxinia perennis than were any of the other species included in Gloxinia by Wiehler, several of which proved to be more closely related to other genera (particularly Diastema, Monopyle, and Phinaea). As a result of this work, most former Gloxinia species have been transferred to other genera while Koellikeria erinoides and Anodiscus xanthophyllus have been transferred into a much more narrowly defined Gloxinia consisting of only three species, all of them characterized by having a raceme-like flowering stem.

Former Gloxinia species have been transferred to a large number of other genera, including the existing genera Monopyle and Sinningia, the resurrected genera Mandirola and Seemannia, and the new genera Gloxinella, Gloxiniopsis, Nomopyle, and Sphaerorrhiza.

Gloxinia perennis forms fertile hybrids with species of Seemannia, which was the primary reason for uniting the two genera in the past.

Sinningia speciosa, a popular houseplant, was originally described and introduced into cultivation as Gloxinia speciosa and is still sometimes referred to as "gloxinia" or "florist's gloxinia", although this name is now inaccurate and technically incorrect. Similarly, "hardy gloxinia" is Incarvillea delavayi, a member of the Bignoniaceae.

== Species ==
Five species are accepted.

Image	Scientific name	Description	Distribution
	Gloxinia alternifolia A.O.Araujo & Chautems	A perennial or rhizomatous geophyte.	West-central Brazil (Mato Grosso do Sul)
	Gloxinia erinoides (DC.) Roalson & Boggan	The plant is a small herb with tiny white and maroon flowers. This diminutive plant is notable for having tiny but distinctly coconut-scented flowers and is occasionally cultivated as a houseplant.	Nicaragua to northwestern Argentina
	Gloxinia major (Fritsch) C.A.Zanotti & Lizarazu	A perennial or rhizomatous geophyte.	Southern Bolivia
	Gloxinia perennis (L.) Druce	The plant is a herb with large nodding, purple, mint-scented flowers. It is sometimes known as "Canterbury bells" (not to be confused with members of the genus Campanula, which go by the same name). It is cultivated in tropical regions and its original range is unknown.	Wide range in Central and South America
	Gloxinia xanthophylla (Poepp.) Roalson & Boggan	The plant is a shrubby herb with small white flowers and is rarely encountered in cultivation. Unlike the other two species, it lacks scaly rhizomes.	Ecuador and Peru

Selected excluded species

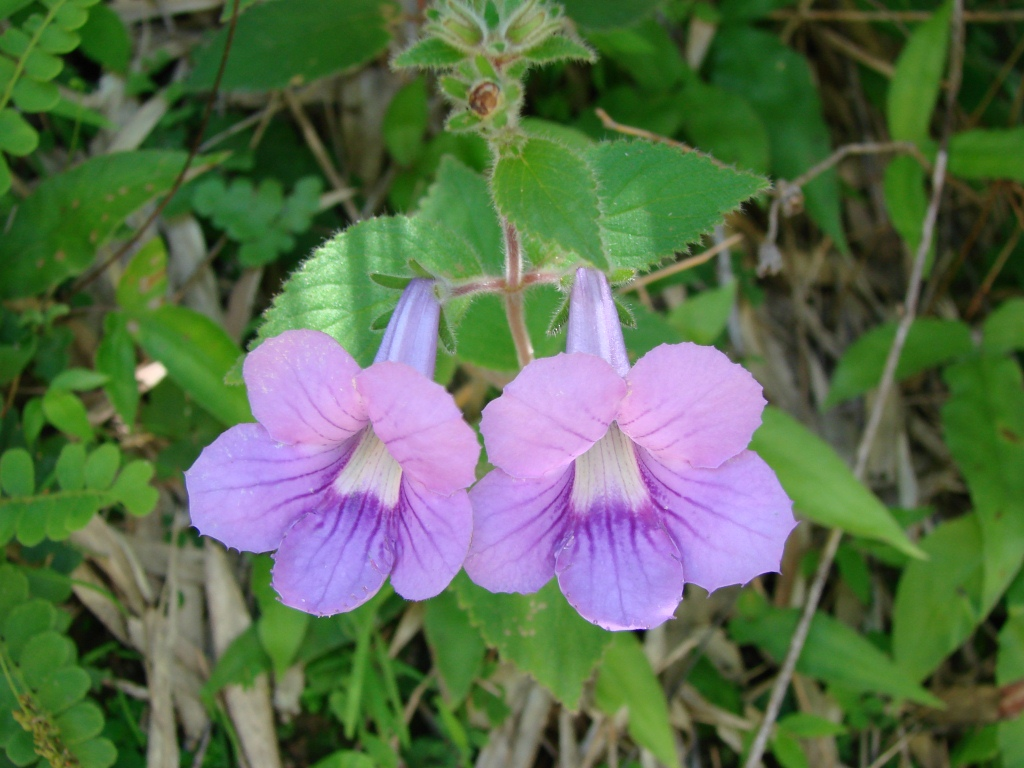
Flowers of Mandirola multiflora

- Gloxinia burchellii = Sphaerorrhiza burchellii
- Gloxinia dodsonii = Nomopyle dodsonii
- Gloxinia gymnostoma = Seemannia gymnostoma
- Gloxinia hirsuta = Sinningia hirsuta
- Gloxinia ichthyostoma = Mandirola ichthyostoma
- Gloxinia lindeniana = Gloxinella lindeniana
- Gloxinia nematanthodes = Seemannia nematanthodes
- Gloxinia planalta = Mandirola multiflora
- Gloxinia purpurascens = Seemannia purpurascens
- Gloxinia racemosa = Gloxiniopsis racemosa
- Gloxinia reflexa = Monopyle reflexa
- Gloxinia rupestris = Mandirola rupestris
- Gloxinia sarmentiana = Sphaerorrhiza sarmentiana
- Gloxinia speciosa = Sinningia speciosa
- Gloxinia sylvatica = Seemannia sylvatica
