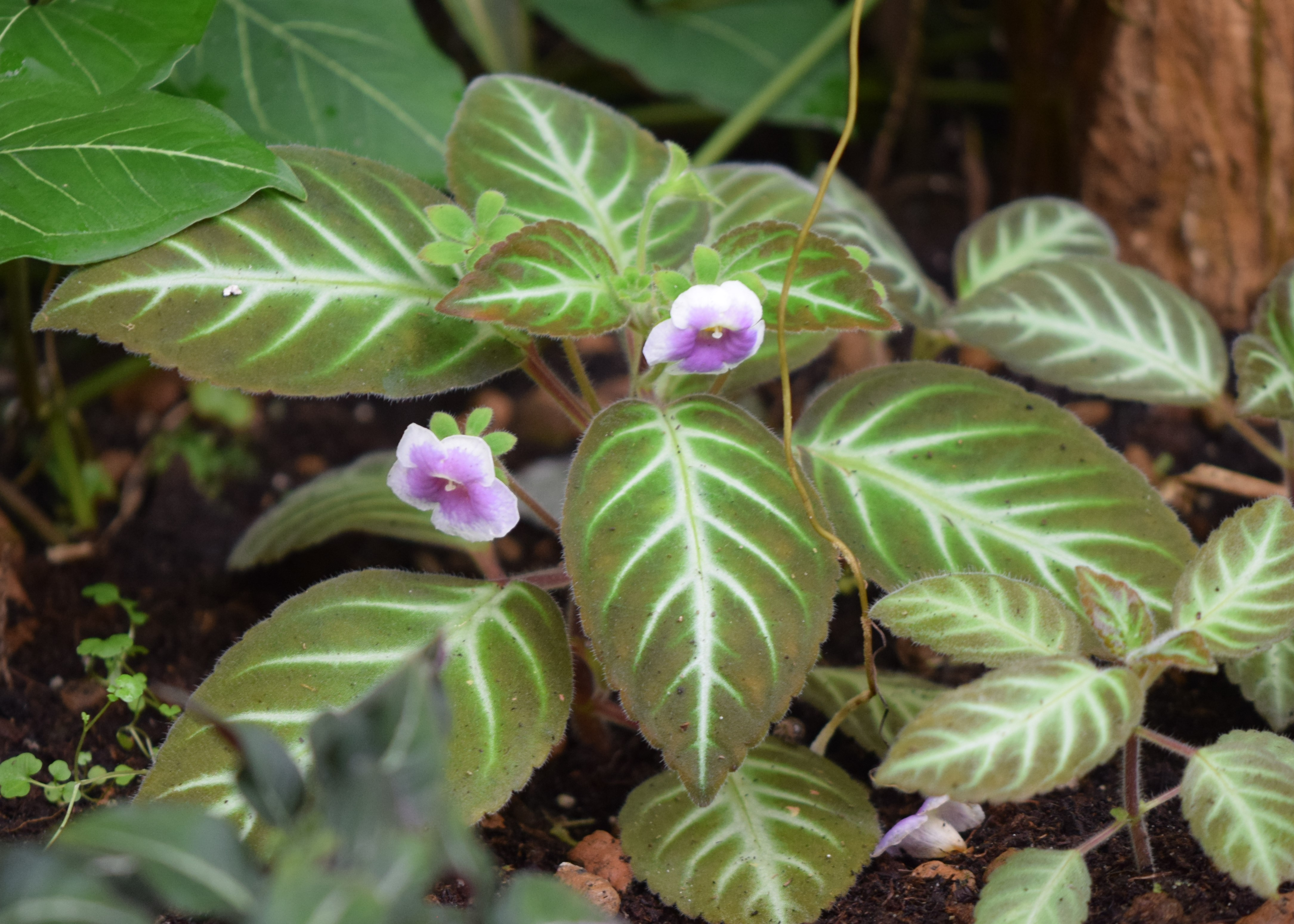
- Gloxinella lindeniana, the sole member of the genus

Scientific classification
- Kingdom: Plantae
- Clade: Tracheophytes
- Clade: Angiosperms
- Clade: Eudicots
- Clade: Asterids
- Order: Lamiales
- Family: Gesneriaceae
- Genus: Gloxinella (H.E.Moore) Roalson & Boggan (2005)
- Species: G. lindeniana

Binomial name
- Gloxinella lindeniana (Regel) Roalson & Boggan (2005)

Synonyms
- Gloxinia lindeniana (Regel) Fritsch (1913); Gloxinia tydaeoides Hanst. ex Regel (1868); Isoloma lindenianum (Regel) N.E.Br. (1882); Isoloma lindenianum G.Nicholson (1885); Kohleria lindeniana (Regel) H.E.Moore (1954); Tydaea lindeniana Regel (1868); Tydaea lindenii André (1873), orth. var.

= Gloxinella =

Genus of plants

Gloxinella is a monotypic genus of flowering plants belonging to the family Gesneriaceae. It only contains one species, Gloxinella lindeniana (Regel) Roalson & Boggan

It is native to Colombia.

The genus name is in honour of Benjamin Peter Gloxin (1765–1794), a German physician and botanical writer. The specific Latin epithet of lindeniana refers to the Luxemburg born botanist Jean Jules Linden (1817-1898).

It was first described and published in Selbyana Vol.25 on page 227 in 2005.
