= Pierre Nicolas d'Incarville =

French Jesuit, missionary and botanist

Pierre Nicolas Le Chéron d'Incarville (21 August 1706 – 12 June 1757) was a French Jesuit and amateur botanist. He was a missionary to China and was the first person to introduce several important plants to the West. During his stay, he was also actively involved in publishing scholarly material on China.

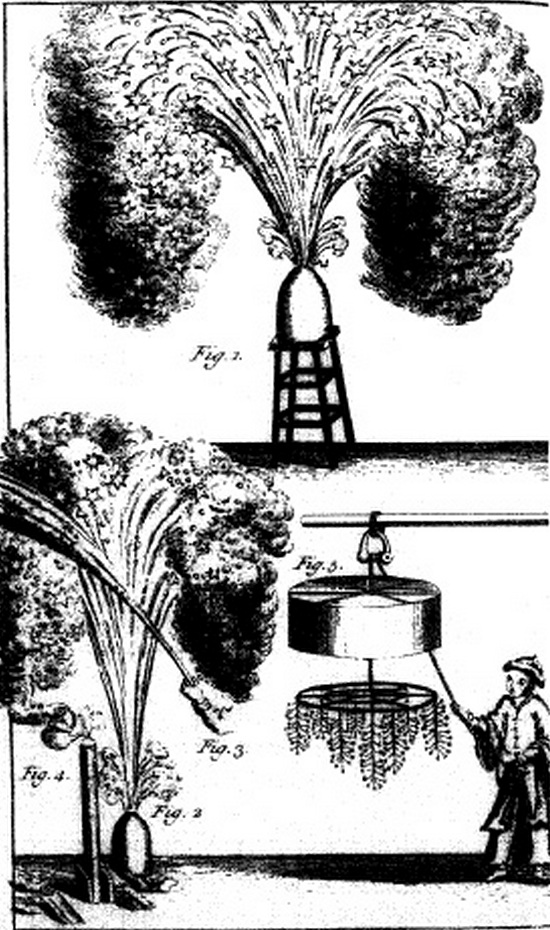
An 18th-century illustration of Chinese fireworks from an English abstract of an account of China by Pierre Nicolas d'Incarville.

== Biography ==
D'Incarville was born in Louviers (although some sources cite Rouen). He entered the Jesuit order in 1727 and taught in Quebec between 1730 and 1739 before being sent on a mission to China in 1740.

He was a pupil of Bernard de Jussieu, whom he called "mon maître en botanique" (my teacher in botanics).

In China he was tasked with converting the Qianlong Emperor of China, but the emperor showed little interest and denied d'Incarville access to the imperial gardens. However, when the emperor was shown some sensitive plants (Mimosa pudica) that d'Incarville had grown, he was so amused that he allowed the Jesuit into the gardens. D'Incarville was on excellent terms with the emperor, and he continued to introduce many other European plants to him during his time in China.

D'Incarville described and sent back seeds of several plants then unknown in Europe as a correspondent of the Jardin des Plantes. He was not a professional botanist, but was nonetheless well educated in the field and was made a correspondent of Claude Joseph Geoffroy at the Académie des Sciences in Paris after refusing to become a foreign associate of the Royal Society. Plants he introduced to the Western world include the tree of heaven (Ailanthus altissima), the pagoda tree (Styphnolobium japonicum), Koelreuteria paniculata and Toona sinensis. He was also the first European to describe the kiwifruit.

D'Incarville died in Beijing in June 1757. Antoine-Laurent de Jussieu named the bignoniaceae genus Incarvillea after him.

== Bibliography ==
- d'Incarville, Father (1753). "A Letter from Father d'Incarville, of the Society of Jesus, at Peking in China, to the late Cromwell Mortimer, M.D. R. S. Secr". Philosophical Transactions of the Royal Society of London. 48 (1): 253–260.

In addition to his correspondence work, he wrote several works that were published in Europe. These covered topics such as the ailanthus silkmoth, Chinese varnishing and fireworks, as well as a French-Chinese dictionary. He also published a copy of a 16th-century botanical illustration work (the Yuzhi bencao pinhui jingyao).

== Sources ==
- Bretschneider, E. (1880). "Early European researches into the flora of China". Journal of the North-China Branch of the Royal Asiatic Society. (pp. 120–124 are about "Father Petrus d'Incarville").
- —— (1898). History of European Botanical Discoveries in China. London: Sampson Low, Marston and Company Ltd.
- Hu, Shiu-ying (March 1979). "Ailanthus altissima" (PDF). Arnoldia. 39 (2): 29–50. Archived from the original (PDF) on 2022-03-28.
- Klingaman, Gerald (July 23, 2004). "Mimosa". Plant of the Week. University of Arkansas Division of Agriculture. Archived from the original on September 12, 2007.
- de Morembert, H. Tribout (1994). "Incarville (Pierre Nicolas Le Chéron d')". In M. Prévost; Roman d'Amat; J.P. Lobies; H. Tribout de Morembert (eds.). Dictionnaire de Biographie française (in French). Vol. XVIII: Humann—Lacombe. Paris: Letouzey et Ané. p. 162. ISBN 2-7063-0177-5.
