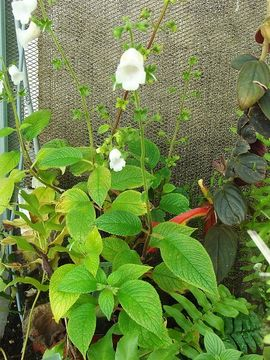
- Gloxiniopsis racemosa, the sole member of the genus

Scientific classification
- Kingdom: Plantae
- Clade: Tracheophytes
- Clade: Angiosperms
- Clade: Eudicots
- Clade: Asterids
- Order: Lamiales
- Family: Gesneriaceae
- Genus: Gloxiniopsis; Roalson & Boggan (2005)
- Species: G. racemosa

Binomial name
- Gloxiniopsis racemosa (Benth.) Roalson & Boggan (2005)

Synonyms
- Gloxinia racemosa (Benth.) Wiehler (1976); Monopyle racemosa Benth. (1876)

= Gloxiniopsis =

Genus of plants

Gloxiniopsis is a genus of flowering plants belonging to the family Gesneriaceae.

Its native range is Colombia.

Species:

- Gloxiniopsis racemosa (Benth.) Roalson & Boggan
