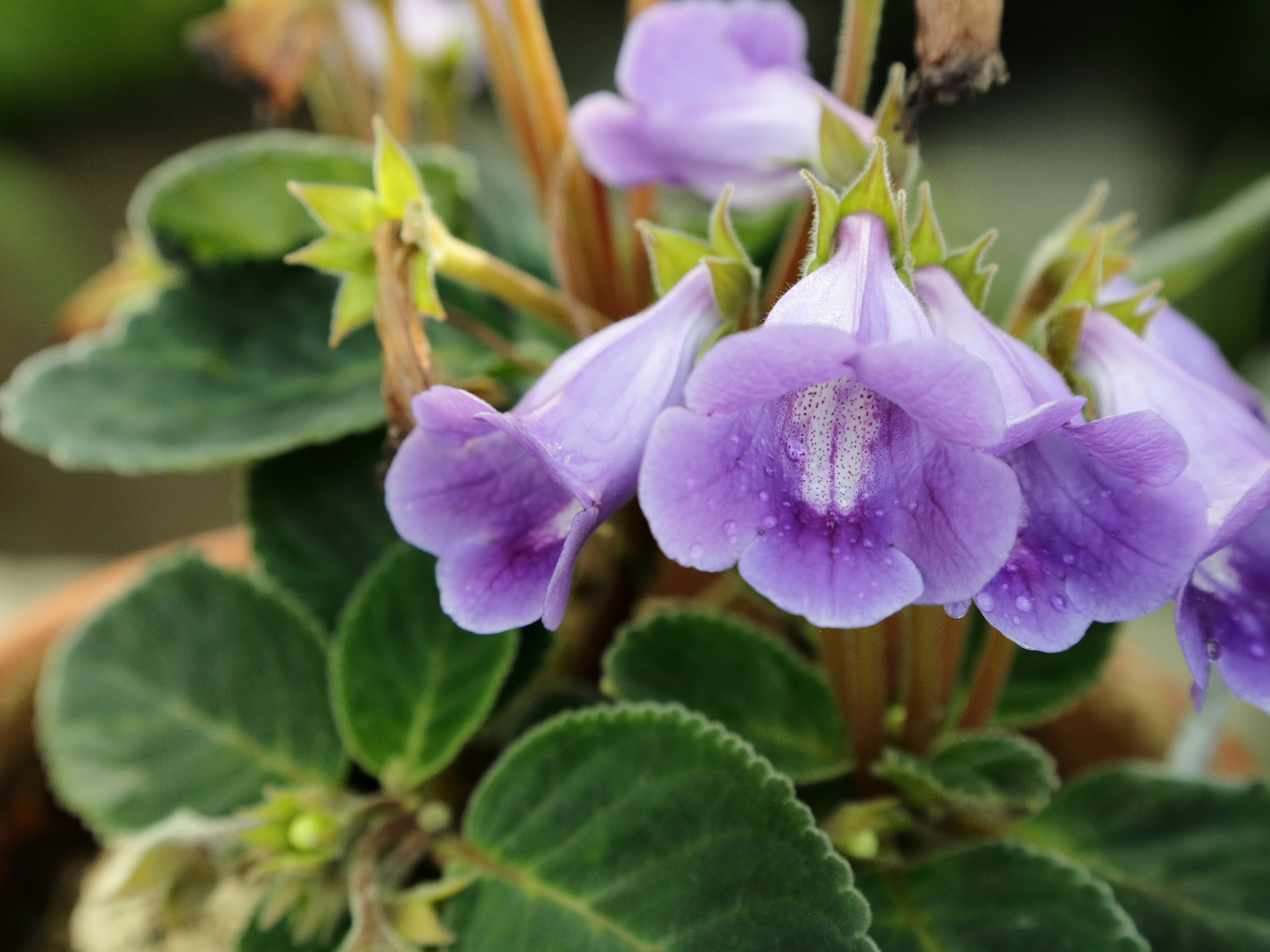
- A variety of Sinningia speciosa

Scientific classification
- Kingdom: Plantae
- Clade: Tracheophytes
- Clade: Angiosperms
- Clade: Eudicots
- Clade: Asterids
- Order: Lamiales
- Family: Gesneriaceae
- Genus: Sinningia; Nees (1825), nom. cons. prop.

Species
- 81; see text

Synonyms
- Alagophylla Raf. (1837); Almana Raf. (1838); Biglandularia Seem. (1868); Coptocheile Hoffmanns. (1842); Corytholoma (Benth.) Decne. (1848); Dircaea Decne. (1848); Dolichodeira Hanst. (1855); Fimbrolina Raf. (1838); Lietzia Regel (1880); Ligeria Decne. (1848); Megapleilis Raf. (1837); Orthanthe Lem. (1856); Rechsteineria Regel (1848), nom. cons.; Rosanowia Regel (1872); Stenogastra Hanst. (1854); Styrosinia Raf. (1837); Tapeinotes DC. (1839), nom. superfl.; Tapina Mart. (1829); Tulisma Raf. (1837); Wildungenia Wender. (1831)

= Sinningia =

Genus of flowering plants

Sinningia /sɪˈnɪndʒiə/ is a genus of flowering plants in the family Gesneriaceae. It is named after Wilhelm Sinning (1792–1874), a gardener of the Botanische Gärten der Friedrich-Wilhelms-Universität Bonn. There are about 65 species of tuberous herbaceous perennials, all occurring in Central and South America, with the greatest concentration of species occurring in southern Brazil.

The best-known species, Sinningia speciosa, was originally introduced in cultivation as Gloxinia speciosa and is still commonly known to gardeners and in the horticultural trade as "gloxinia", although this is now considered incorrect. The true genus Gloxinia is distinguished by having scaly rhizomes rather than tubers.

Sinningia species often grow on rocks or cliffs and most are pollinated by hummingbirds or bees but Sinningia brasiliensis is bat-pollinated, and Sinningia tubiflora, with large, powerfully fragrant tubular white flowers, is apparently pollinated by sphinx moths. Most of the species have large, brightly colored flowers. Because of this, numerous species and numerous hybrids and cultivars are grown as houseplants. Some species with particularly large tubers are cultivated by cactus and succulent enthusiasts as caudiciforms. One such example is Sinningia leucotricha, often listed under the older name Rechsteineria leucotricha and dubbed "Brazilian edelweiss" for its covering of silvery, silky hairs. Other species with large tubers are Sinningia iarae, Sinningia lineata, and Sinningia macropoda. The Brazilian genera Paliavana and Vanhouttea, consisting of shrubby plants without tubers, are closely related to Sinningia and recent morphological and molecular analyses (Boggan 1991, Perret et al. 2003) suggest that these genera are, in fact, nontuberous Sinningia species. All three genera were included in tribe Gloxinieae in the classification system of Hans Wiehler but are now recognized in their own tribe, Sinningieae.

Numerous genera, including Corytholoma, Rechsteineria and Lietzia, have been synonymized under Sinningia.

== Garden uses and cultivation ==
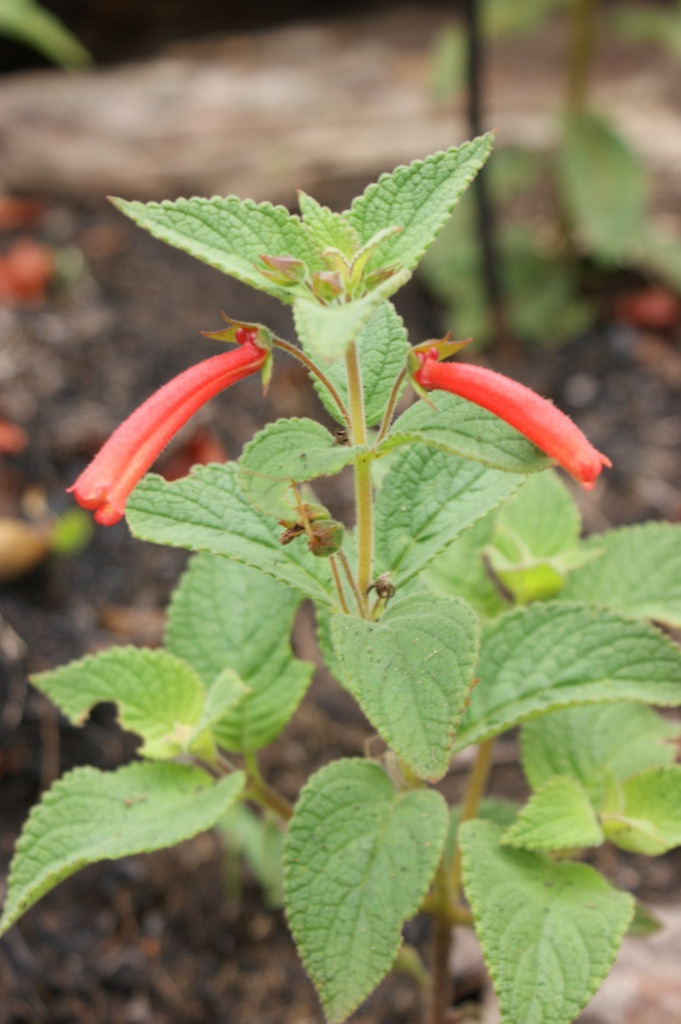
Sinningia incarnata

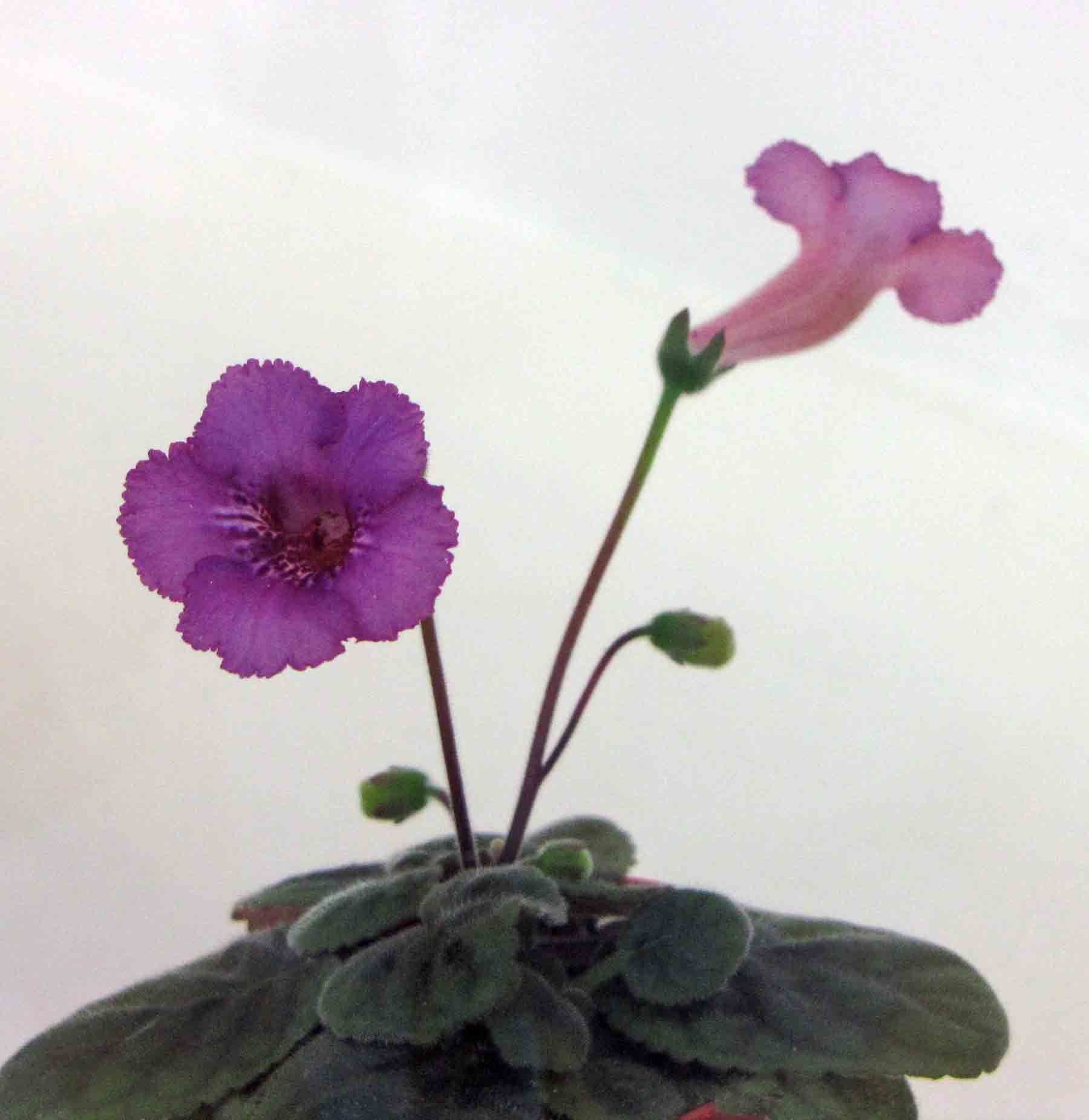
A miniature Sinningia hybrid

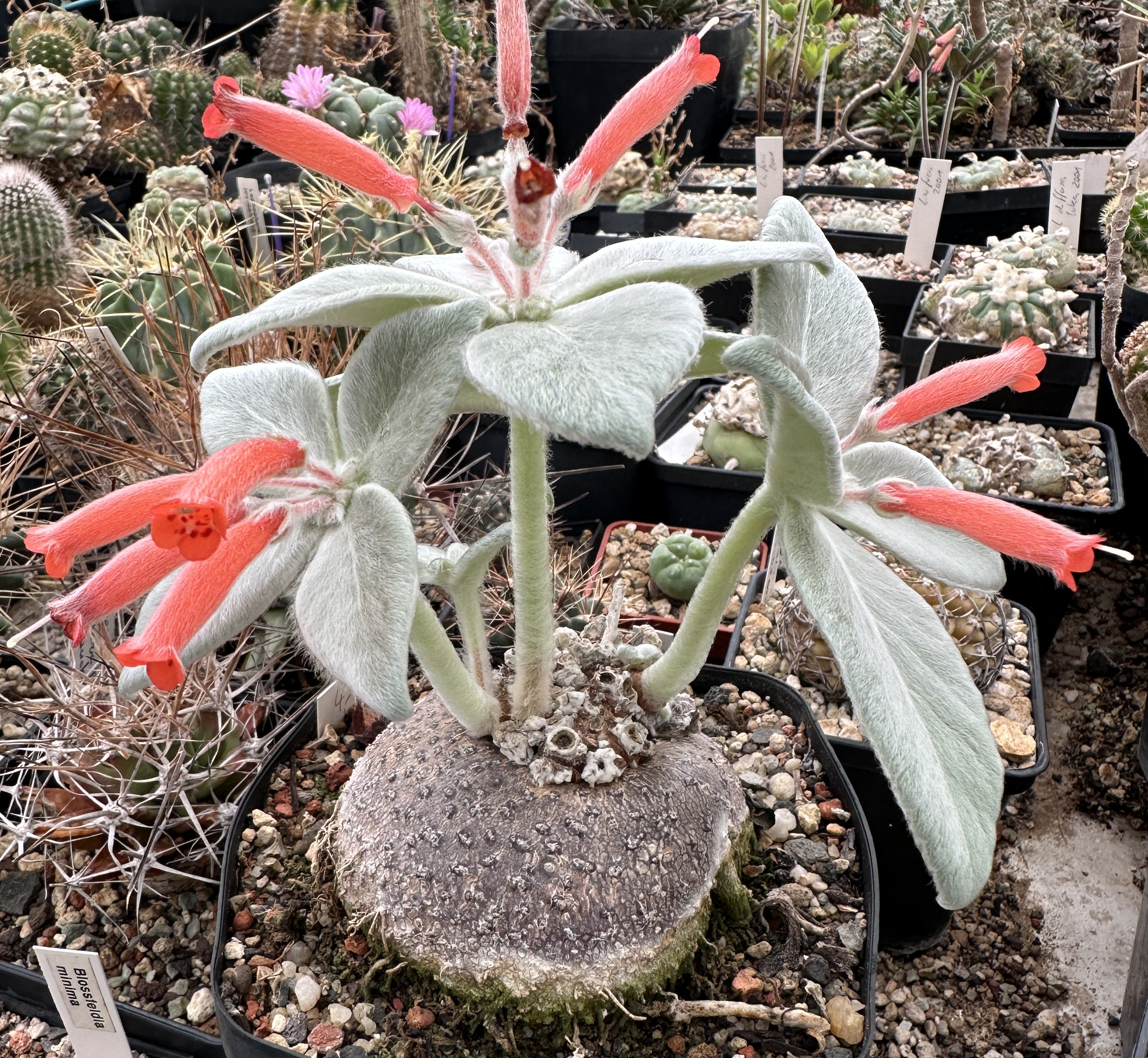
Sinningia leucotricha cultivated to highlight the large tuber

Sinningias are attractive greenhouse plants and houseplants that appeal strongly to gardeners who like to specialize in particular plant groups. The chief environmental needs are warmth, high humidity, suitable soil and good light with shade from strong sun. The soil should be well drained. It should contain a liberal proportion of organic matter, such as leaf mold or peat moss, and enough coarse sand or perlite to ensure good porosity.

The hybrid cultivars 'Empress Purple Spotted' and 'Empress Red' have gained the Royal Horticultural Society's Award of Garden Merit.

== Species ==
81 species are accepted.

- Sinningia aggregata (Ker Gawl.) Wiehler
- Sinningia aghensis Chautems
- Sinningia allagophylla (Mart.) Wiehler
- Sinningia amambayensis Chautems
- Sinningia araneosa Chautems
- Sinningia barbata (Nees & Mart.) G. Nicholson
- Sinningia bragae Chautems, M.Peixoto & Rossini
- Sinningia brasiliensis (Regel & E. Schmidt) Wiehler
- Sinningia bulbosa (Ker Gawl.) Wiehler
- Sinningia bullata Chautems & M.Peixoto
- Sinningia calcaria (Dusén ex Malme) Chautems
- Sinningia canastrensis Chautems
- Sinningia canescens (Mart.) Wiehler
- Sinningia carangolensis Chautems
- Sinningia cardinalis (Lehm.) H.E.Moore
- Sinningia carolinae (Wawra) Benth. & Hook. f. ex Siebert & Voss
- Sinningia cochlearis (Hook.) Chautems
- Sinningia concinna (Hook. f.) G. Nicholson
- Sinningia conspicua (Seem.) Focke
- Sinningia cooperi (J. Paxton) Wiehler
- Sinningia curtiflora (Malme) Chautems
- Sinningia defoliata (Malme) Chautems
- Sinningia douglasii (Lindl.) Chautems
- Sinningia elatior (Kunth) Chautems
- Sinningia eumorpha H.E. Moore
- Sinningia flammea Chautems & Rossini
- Sinningia ganevii Chautems & Mat.Perret
- Sinningia gerdtiana Chautems
- Sinningia gesnerifolia (Hanst.) Clayberg
- Sinningia gigantifolia Chautems
- Sinningia glazioviana (Fritsch) Chautems
- Sinningia globulosa Chautems & M.Peixoto
- Sinningia guttata Lindl.
- Sinningia harleyi Chautems
- Sinningia hatschbachii Chautems
- Sinningia helioana Chautems & Rossini
- Sinningia helleri Nees
- Sinningia hirsuta (Lindl.) G.Nicholson
- Sinningia hoehnei Chautems, A.P.Fontana & Rossini
- Sinningia iarae Chautems
- Sinningia incarnata (Aubl.) D.L.Denham
- Sinningia insularis (Hoehne) Chautems
- Sinningia kautskyi Chautems
- Sinningia lateritia (Lindl.) Chautems
- Sinningia leopoldii (Scheidw. ex Planch.) Chautems
- Sinningia leucotricha (Hoehne) H.E.Moore
- Sinningia lindleyi Schauer
- Sinningia lineata (Hjelmq.) Chautems
- Sinningia lutea Buzatto & R.B.Singer
- Sinningia macrophylla (Nees & Mart.) Benth. & Hook.f. ex Fritsch
- Sinningia macropoda (Sprague) H.E.Moore
- Sinningia macrostachya (Lindl.) Chautems
- Sinningia magnifica (Otto & A. Dietr.) Wiehler
- Sinningia mauroana Chautems
- Sinningia micans (Fritsch) Chautems
- Sinningia minima A.O.Araujo & Chautems
- Sinningia muscicola Chautems, T.Lopes & M.Peixoto
- Sinningia nivalis Chautems
- Sinningia nordestina Chautems, Baracho & J.A.Siqueira Filho
- Sinningia piresiana (Hoehne) Chautems
- Sinningia polyantha (DC.) Wiehler
- Sinningia punctata Ysabeau
- Sinningia pusilla (Mart.) Baill.
- Sinningia ramboi G.E.Ferreira, Waechter & Chautems
- Sinningia reitzii (Hoehne) L.E. Skog
- Sinningia richii Clayberg
- Sinningia rupicola (Mart.) Wiehler
- Sinningia sceptrum (Mart.) Wiehler
- Sinningia schiffneri Fritsch
- Sinningia schomburgkiana (Kunth & C.D.Bouché) Chautems
- Sinningia sellovii (Mart.) Wiehler
- Sinningia speciosa (Lodd.) Hiern
- Sinningia stapelioides Chautems & M.Peixoto
- Sinningia striata (Fritsch) Chautems
- Sinningia sulcata (Rusby) Wiehler
- Sinningia sulphurea Chautems & D.B.O.S.Cardoso
- Sinningia tuberosa (Mart.) H.E.Moore
- Sinningia tubiflora (Hook.) Fritsch
- Sinningia valsuganensis Chautems
- Sinningia velutina Lindl.
- Sinningia villosa Lindl.
- Sinningia warmingii (Hiern) Chautems
