= Truxinic acid =

Names
- IUPAC name 7,7′-Cyclolignane-9,9′-dioic acid
- Systematic IUPAC name 3,4-Diphenylcyclobutane-1,2-dicarboxylic acid

Identifiers
CAS Number	528-35-8; β: 528-34-7
3D model (JSmol)	Interactive image; μ: Interactive image
ChemSpider	233812; β: 8119639; μ: 103883278
PubChem CID	266036
CompTox Dashboard (EPA)	DTXSID60963283
- InChI: InChI=1S/C18H16O4/c19-17(20)15-13(11-7-3-1-4-8-11)14(16(15)18(21)22)12-9-5-2-6-10-12/h1-10,13-16H,(H,19,20)(H,21,22) Key: QVNDSQQNODQYJM-UHFFFAOYSA-N; μ: InChI=1S/C18H16O4/c19-17(20)15-13(11-7-3-1-4-8-11)14(16(15)18(21)22)12-9-5-2-6-10-12/h1-10,13-16H,(H,19,20)(H,21,22)/t13-,14-,15-,16-/m0/s1 Key: QVNDSQQNODQYJM-VGWMRTNUSA-N
- SMILES: c1ccc(cc1)C2C(C(C2C(=O)O)C(=O)O)c3ccccc3; μ: O=C(O)[C@@H]1[C@@H](C(=O)O)[C@@H](c2ccccc2)[C@@H]1c1ccccc1

Properties
Chemical formula	C_{18}H_{16}O_{4}
Molar mass	296.322 g·mol^{−1}
- Except where otherwise noted, data are given for materials in their standard state (at 25 °C [77 °F], 100 kPa). Infobox references

Truxinic acids are any of several stereoisomeric cyclic dicarboxylic acids with the formula (C_{6}H_{5})_{2}C_{4}H_{4}(COOH)_{2}, found in various plants. They are obtained by a photochemical cycloaddition from cinnamic acid, where the two trans alkenes react head-to-head.

== Isomers ==
Ten stereoisomers are possible. Of these, the ω and β isomers are meso compounds, while the others form pairs of enantiomers.

Truxinic acid isomers
Isomer	a	b	c	d	e	f
ω-truxinic acid	C_{6}H_{5}	H	COOH	H	COOH	H
β-truxinic acid	C_{6}H_{5}	H	H	COOH	H	COOH
neo-truxinic acid	C_{6}H_{5}	H	COOH	H	H	COOH
ζ-truxinic acid	H	C_{6}H_{5}	COOH	H	COOH	H
μ-truxinic acid	H	C_{6}H_{5}	H	COOH	COOH	H
δ-truxinic acid	H	C_{6}H_{5}	COOH	H	H	COOH

== See also ==
- Truxillic acids, which are isomers of the truxinic acids
