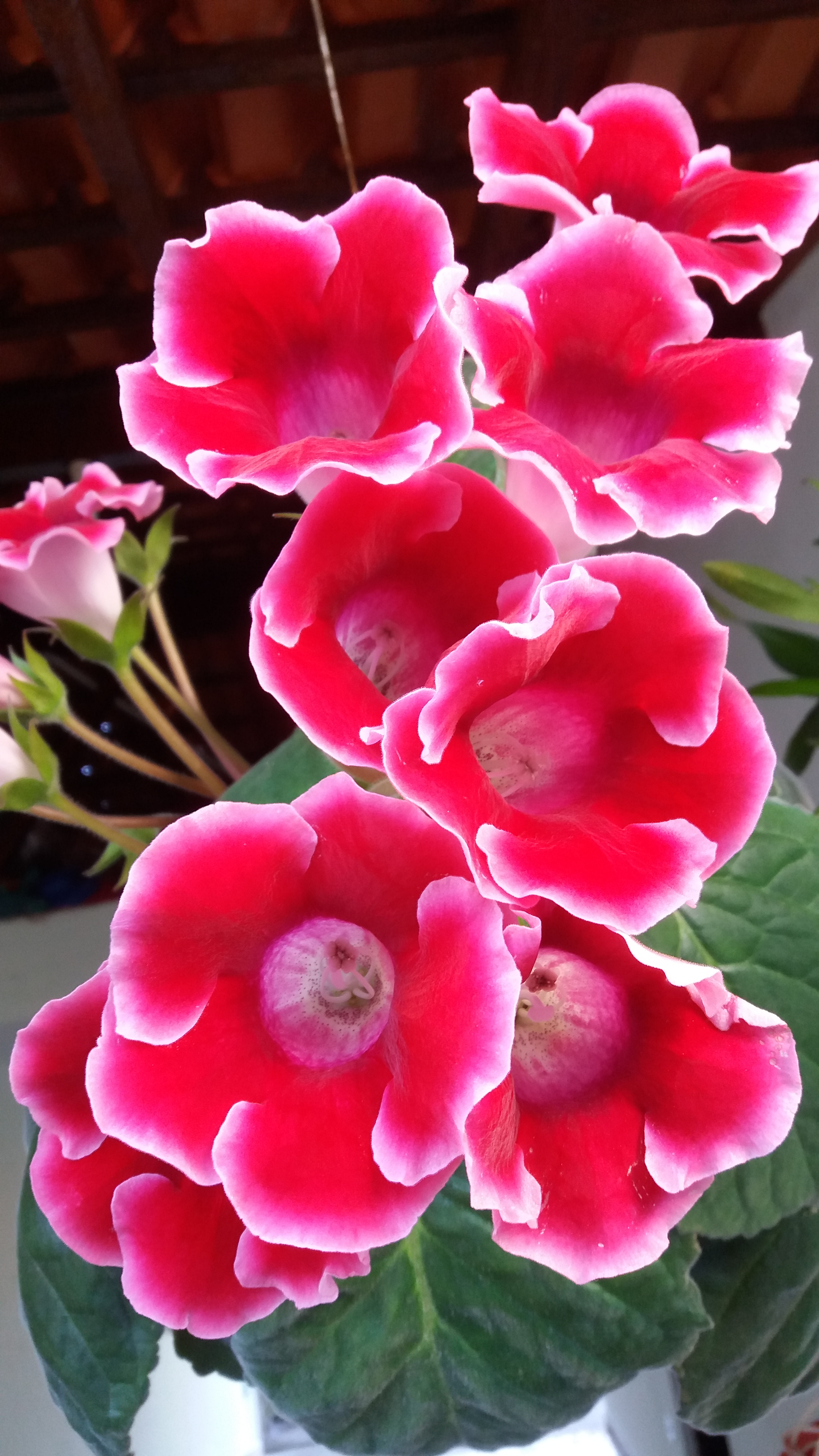
- A Sinningia speciosa cultivar

Scientific classification
- Kingdom: Plantae
- Clade: Tracheophytes
- Clade: Angiosperms
- Clade: Eudicots
- Clade: Asterids
- Order: Lamiales
- Family: Gesneriaceae
- Genus: Sinningia
- Species: S. speciosa

Binomial name
- Sinningia speciosa Baill.

Synonyms
- Gloxinia caulescens Lindl.; Gloxinia discolor Kunze; Gloxinia diversiflora May; Gloxinia fyfiana Lem.; Gloxinia immaculata Mart. ex Hanst.; Gloxinia maxima Paxton; Gloxinia menziesiana Young ex Otto & A.Dietr.; Gloxinia merkii E.Otto; Gloxinia passinghamii Paxton; Gloxinia rubra Paxton; Gloxinia speciosa Lodd.; Gloxinia teuchleri Lem.; Ligeria caulescens (Lindl.) Decne.; Ligeria menziesiana (Young ex Otto & Dietr.) Hanst.; Ligeria speciosa (Lodd.) Decne.; Sinningia menziesiana (Young ex Otto & Dietr.) G. Nicholson

= Sinningia speciosa =

Species of flowering plant

Sinningia speciosa, sometimes known in the horticultural trade as gloxinia, is a tuberous member of the flowering plant native to Brazil within the family Gesneriaceae. Originally included in the genus Gloxinia in 1817, it was reclassified to Sinningia. Showy S. speciosa hybrids are still sometimes referred to simply as "gloxinia", although this name is now technically incorrect.

The name florist's gloxinia is now sometimes used to distinguish it from the rhizomatous species now included in the genus Gloxinia. Another common name is Brazilian gloxinia. The plants produce large, velvety, brightly colored flowers and are popular houseplants.

== Cultivation ==
Although generally grown indoors, it is hardy in USDA hardiness zones 10-12. Cultural requirements are similar to those of African violets except that S. speciosa generally requires more light and often has a dormant period, when the tuber should be kept cool and dry until it resprouts.
