= Jean Jules Linden =

Belgian botanist

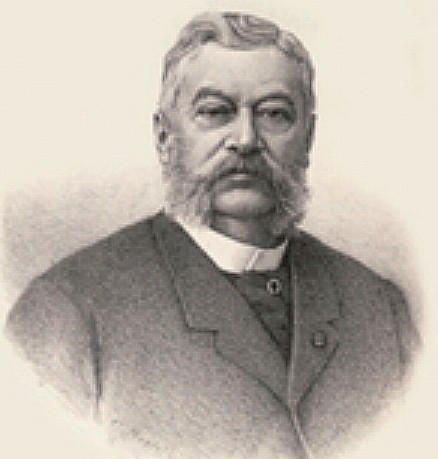
Jean Jules Linden

Jean Jules Linden (12 February 1817, in Luxembourg – 12 January 1898, in Brussels) was a Belgian botanist, explorer, horticulturist and businessman. He specialised in orchids, which he wrote a number of books about.

== Life and work ==
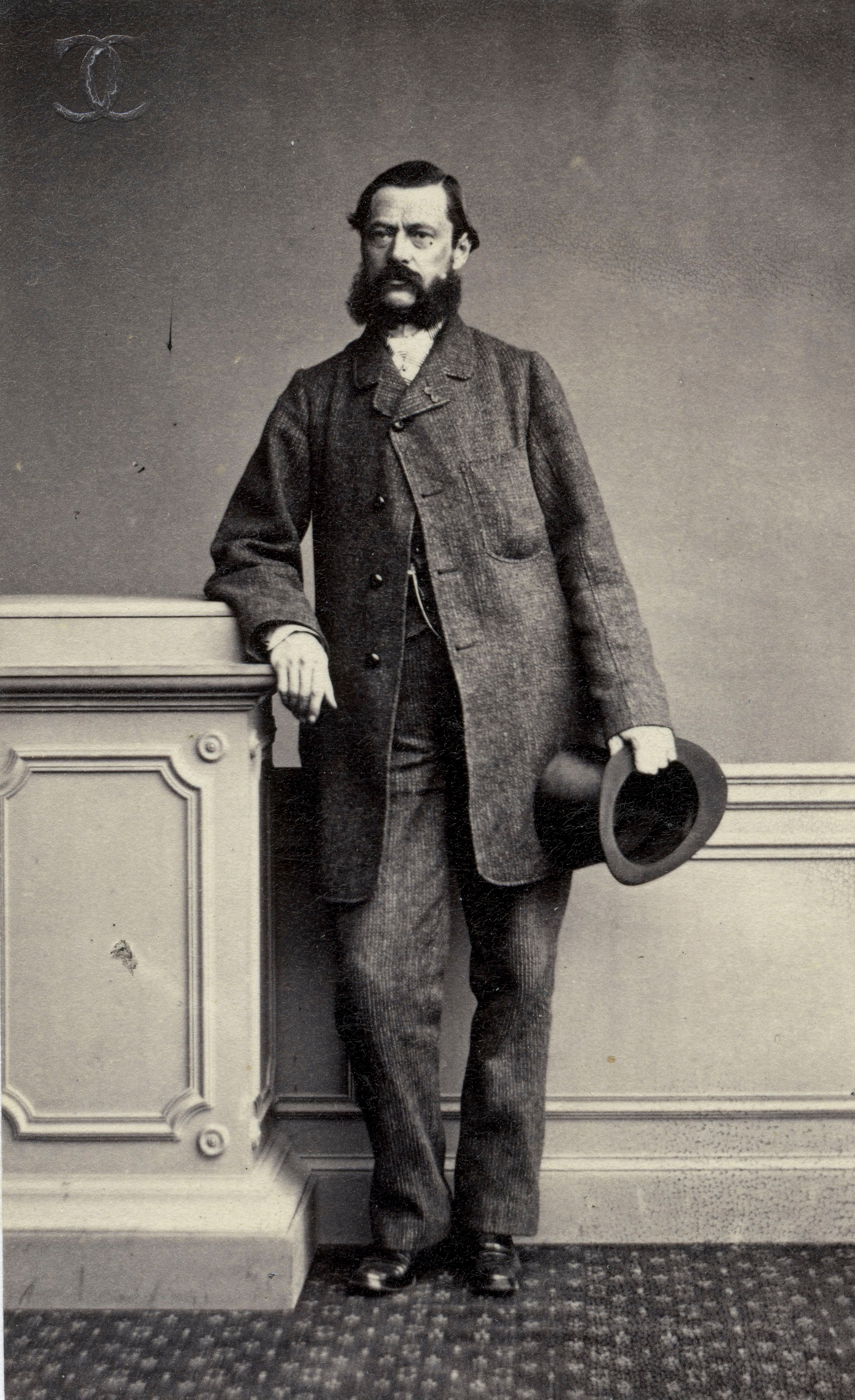
c. 1865

Jean Linden studied at the Athénée Royal in Luxembourg until 1834 and went on to the faculty of science at the Free University of Brussels. In 1835, Jean Linden put forward his name when the Belgian government invited applications from academic circles for an exploration of Latin America. As a result, Jean Linden, Nicolas Funck (1816–1896), and Auguste Ghiesbreght (1810–1893) left Antwerp on 25 September 1835 for Rio de Janeiro and arrived in Brazil on 27 December. They remained in Brazil, collecting plants and animals, returning to Belgium in March 1837. As a result of this trip, Linden's lifelong preoccupation with orchids was born.

Six months later, in September 1837, the same trio left Le Havre and reached Havana in December. The team explored Cuba and Mexico, collecting live animals and plants, until 1840. Linden suffered an acute attack of yellow fever near Laguna de Términos.

He went on several expeditions and made a detailed study of orchid growth conditions in their natural habitat. His findings revolutionised the cultivation of orchids under European conditions. Before his research, orchids were being kept at temperatures far greater than their needs, resulting in a high mortality rate. Following Linden's lead, British botanist John Lindley also made detailed observations of the habitats where he collected plants.

In Brussels, Linden was briefly the director of the Brussels zoological and botanical garden. He gradually concentrated on orchid culture, using three types of conservatory with temperatures ranging from cool to warm. Under these conditions his orchids thrived. With this success, he created an orchid empire that, at its peak, had branches in Brussels, Ghent, and Paris, winning awards at exhibitions in London, Paris, and St. Petersburg. He published exceptional books on orchids and orchid-growing.

Linden married Anna Reuter in Luxembourg on 13 October 1845. His son Lucien eventually took over all his business interests and published books on orchids before and after Jean's death.

He is commemorated in Gloxinella lindeniana (Regel) Roalson & Boggan (part of the Gesneriaceae family), Iresine lindenii now a synonym of Iresine diffusa f. lindenii (Van Houtte) L.B.Sm. & Downs (Amaranthaceae), Phalaenopsis lindenii (Orchidaceae), and Polyrrhiza lindenii, also in the Orchidaceae family.

This botanist is denoted by the author abbreviation Linden when citing a botanical name.

== Sources ==
- National Botanic Garden of Belgium
- Jean Linden biography
