= N-Acylethanolamine =

Class of chemical compounds

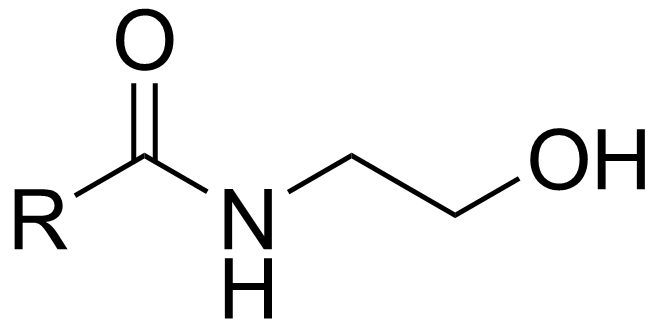
General chemical structure of N-acylethanolamines

An N-acylethanolamine (NAE) is a type of fatty acid amide where one of several types of acyl groups is linked to the nitrogen atom of ethanolamine, and highly metabolic formed by intake of essential fatty acids through diet by 20:4, n-6 and 22:6, n-3 fatty acids, and when the body is physically and psychologically active,. The endocannabinoid signaling system (ECS) is the major pathway by which NAEs exerts its physiological effects in animal cells with similarities in plants, and the metabolism of NAEs is an integral part of the ECS, a very ancient signaling system, being clearly present from the divergence of the protostomian/deuterostomian, and even further back in time, to the very beginning of bacteria, the oldest organisms on Earth known to express phosphatidylethanolamine, the precursor to endocannabinoids, in their cytoplasmic membranes. Fatty acid metabolites with affinity for CB receptors are produced by cyanobacteria, which diverged from eukaryotes at least 2000 Million years ago (MYA), by brown algae which diverged about 1500 MYA, by sponges, which diverged from eumetazoans about 930 MYA, and a lineages that predate the evolution of CB receptors, as CB1 – CB2 duplication event may have occurred prior to the lophotrochozoan-deuterostome divergence 590 MYA. Fatty acid amide hydrolase (FAAH) evolved relatively recently, either after the evolution of fish 400 MYA, or after the appearance of mammals 300 MYA, but after the appearance of vertebrates. Linking FAAH, vanilloid receptors (VR1) and anandamide (NAE 20:4) implies a coupling among the remaining older parts of the endocannabinoid system, monoglyceride lipase (MGL), CB receptors, that evolved prior to the metazoan–bilaterian divergence (ie, between extant Hydra and leech), but were secondarily lost in the Ecdysozoa, and 2-Arachidonoylglycerol (2-AG).

These amides conceptually can be formed from a fatty acid and ethanolamine with the release of a molecule of water, but the known biological synthesis uses a specific phospholipase D to cleave the phospholipid unit from N-acylphosphatidylethanolamines. Another route relies on the transesterification of acyl groups from phosphatidylcholine by an N-acyltransferase (NAT) activity. The suffixes -amine and -amide in these names each refer to the single nitrogen atom of ethanolamine that links the compound together: it is termed "amine" in ethanolamine because it is considered as a free terminal nitrogen in that subunit, while it is termed "amide" when it is considered in association with the adjacent carbonyl group of the acyl subunit. Names for these compounds may be encountered with either "amide" or "amine" varying by author.

N-acylethanolamines (NAEs) are broken down, or hydrolysed, by fatty acid amide hydrolase (FAAH) to ethanolamine (MEA) and their corresponding fatty acid, arachidonic acid. FAAH is activated during stress exposure circumstances, which also raises the neuronal excitability in the amygdala, a critical brain area that mediates anxiety, and the anxiolytic outcome of CB1 receptor activation. Inhibition of FAAH has been shown to increase the levels of NAEs in vivo and to produce desirable phenotypes, that produce analgesic, anxiolytic, neuroprotective, and anti-inflammatory effects, like in high-level performance athletes (i.e., elite athletes) that present an extraordinary interindividual variability of physical, but also mental traits, that greatly influence their sports accomplishments and their career longevity, by an FAAH genetic polymorphism that produce the SNP rs324420 (C385A allele), associated with a higher sensitivity of FAAH to proteolytic degradation and a shorter half-life, as compared to the C variant, as the A variant displays normal catalytic properties, but an enhanced sensitivity to degradation, leading to increased NAE and anandamide (AEA) signaling. Activation of the cannabinoid receptor CB1 or CB2 in different tissues, including skin, inhibit FAAH, and thereby increases endocannabinoid levels.

== Examples ==
Examples of N-acylethanolamines include:

- Anandamide (N-arachidonoylethanolamine; NAE) or arachidonoylethanolamine (AEA: C_{22}H_{37}NO_{2}; 20:4, ω-6) is the amide of arachidonic acid (C_{20}H_{32}O_{2}; 20:4, ω-6) and ethanolamine (MEA: C_{2}H_{7}NO). It is the ligand of both cannabinoid receptors and vanilloid receptor that attenuates pain sensation. Where binding to cannabinoid receptors is coupled to nitric oxide (NO) release in the central nervous system of invertebrates and in peripheral immune cells of both invertebrates and humans.
- N-Palmitoylethanolamine (PEA: C_{18}H_{37}NO_{2}; 16:0) is the amide of palmitic acid (C_{16}H_{32}O_{2}; 16:0) and ethanolamine. It is a ligand at CB2 receptors, and PPAR-α. It has anti-inflammatory activity and also attenuates pain sensation in mammals, whose levels are increased following neuroinflammatory or neuropathic conditions in both animals and humans, possibly to exert a local anti-inflammatory and analgesic action. NAE 16:0 has also been identified in plants including corn, and seeds of cotton, okra, tomato, castor bean, soya bean and peanuts, but its physiological functions remain unknown,
- N-alpha-Linoleoylethanolamide (ALEA: C_{20}H_{35}NO_{2}; 18:3, ω-3) or Anandamide (18:3, n-3), is a metabolic product of the omega-3 fat α-linoleic acid (ALA: C_{18}H_{30}O_{2}; 18:3, ω-3) and ethanolamine (MEA: C_{2}H_{7}NO).
- N-Oleoylethanolamine (OEA: C_{20}H_{39}NO_{2}; 18:1, ω-9) is the amide of oleic acid (C_{18}H_{34}O_{2}; 18:1) and ethanolamine. It has anorexic effects and enables fat breakdown by stimulating PPAR-alpha. In plants, NAE 18:1 is present abundantly in dry seeds and levels decline during seed imbibition, but its physiological functions are yet to be elucidated. In humans, plasma OEA levels are also found positively correlated with positive mood and emotions. OEA acting mostly at peroxisome proliferator‐activated receptor‐α (PPAR‐α) nuclear receptors and, to some extent, TRPV1 channels.
- N-Stearoylethanolamine (SEA: C_{20}H_{41}NO_{2}; 18:0) is the amide of stearic acid (C_{18}H_{36}O_{2}) and ethanolamine (MEA: C_{2}H_{7}NO). It has pro-apoptotic activity. It operates independently of the known cannabinoid and vanilloid receptors targeted by anandamide. It is an inhibitor of the sphingolipid signaling pathway, via specific ceramidase inhibition (ceramidase converts ceramide to sphingosine) and blocks the effects of TNF- and arachidonic acid on intracellular Ca^{2+} concentration.
- N-Linoleoyl ethanolamide (MEA: C_{20}H_{37}NO_{2}; 18:2, ω-6) or Anandamide (18:2, n-6) is the ethanolamide of linoleic acid (LA: C_{18}H_{32}O_{2}; 18:2, ω-6) and its metabolized incorporated ethanolamine (MEA: C_{2}H_{7}NO), is the first natural inhibitor of fatty acid amide hydrolase (FAAH) discovered, also derives from hydroperoxides of NAE 20:4 (AEA) or its linoleoyl analogues by lipoxygenase action.
- N-Docosahexaenoyl ethanolamine (DHEA: C_{24}H_{37}NO_{2}; 22:6, ω-3), or Anandamide (22:6, n-3) "synaptamide", is the non-oxidative produced amide of the mainly fish oil derived, docosahexaenoic acid (DHA: C_{22}H_{32}O_{2}; 22:6, ω-3), that is the most abundant polyunsaturated fatty acid (PUFA) in the brain and the retina, and ethanolamine (MEA: C_{2}H_{7}NO). It can act at CB1 and CB2 receptors, and have anti-proliferative effects on prostate cancer cell lines and promotes synaptogenesis, neurogenesis and neuritogenesis, and as an endogenous metabolite of DHA, it promotes brain development and function.
- N-Docosatetraenoylethanolamine (DEA: C_{24}H_{41}NO_{2}; 22:4,ω-6) act on the CB1 receptor, and possible CB2.
- N-Eicosapentaenoylethanolamide (EPEA: C_{22}H_{35}NO_{2}; 20:5, ω-3) or Anandamide (20:5, n-3). It is the amide of eicosapentaenoic acid (EPA: C_{20}H_{30}O_{2}; 20:5, n-3), that can act on CB1 and CB2 receptors in combination with PPAR-gamma to decrease LPS induced adipocyte IL-6 and MCP-1 levels.
- N-homo-gamma-linolenoylethanolamine, or Anandamide (20:3,n-6) (HGLEA: C_{22}H_{39}NO_{2}; 20:3,ω-6).

These bioactive lipid amides are generated by the membrane enzyme NAPE-PLD, and natural bile acids regulate this essential process. An in vivo active NAPE-PLD inhibitor called LEI-401 was found to be CNS-active and modulated NAE biosynthesis. It had similar effects as a cannabinoid CB1 receptor antagonist, which could be reversed by co-treatment with a FAAH inhibitor.

At least two pathways distinct from NAPE-PLD have been proposed as metabolic pathways for NAE 20:4 (AEA) formation. One pathway involves the double-O-deacylation of NAPEs by α,β-hydrolase (ABHD4) to form glycerophospho-N-acylethanolamines (GP-NAEs), followed by conversion of these intermediates to NAEs by glycerophosphodiesterase-1 (GDE1). Another pathway uses a phospholipase C (PLC) to produce phopho-N-arachidonoylethanolamine (pAEA) from NAPE, widely found in phospholipids, followed by conversion of pAEA into NAE 20:4 (AEA) by phosphatases such as PTPN22 and SHIP1.

The effects of NAE 20:4 (AEA) and another endocannabinoid 2-Arachidonoylglycerol (2-AG: C_{23}H_{38}O_{4}; 20:4, ω-6), with tissue levels of 2-AG usually several tens to several hundreds of times those of AEA, is found to be enhanced by "entourage compounds", NAEs that inhibit their hydrolysis via substrate competition, and thereby prolong their action. These compounds include N-palmitylethanolamide (PEA, NAE 16:0), N-oleoylethanolamide (SEA, NAE 18:0), and cis-9-octadecenoamide (OEA, oleamide, NAE 18:1).

All are members of the endocannabinoidome, a complex lipid signaling system composed of more than 100 of fatty acid-derived mediators and their receptors, its anabolic and catabolic enzymes of more than 50 proteins, which are deeply involved in the control of energy metabolism and its pathological deviations, as well as immunosuppression, and some NAE members, do not activate the CB1 and CB2 receptors efficiently, but instead activate other receptors (e.g. peroxisome proliferator-activated receptors (PPAR)-α/γ, G-protein coupled receptors (GPR) 55, 110, 118, 119, TRPV1 channels), known to counteract metabolic disorders in animal models, by gut bacterial families (e.g. Veillonellaceae, Peptostreptococcaceae and Akkermansiaceae) associated with variations in most NAEs and omega3-derived 2-monoacylglycerols (2‑MAGs), congeners of 2-AG, as gut microbiota communities and the host endocannabinoidome also seem to be interrelated in a mutual crosstalk controlling whole body metabolism, and onset and development of chronic intestinal inflammation.

NAE's are also involved in modulation of different physiological processes such as pain, stress, anxiety, appetite, cardiovascular function and inflammation. A study suggests the presence of an endogenous NAE tone control emotional behavior.

Raphael Mechoulam that described and named Anandamide in 1992. He said:

Look, I believe there are 8 billion people on this planet, and I believe there are 8 billion different personalities. One way of explaining it is, there are several hundred compounds, endocannabinoid-like compounds. They are like anandamide in their chemical structure, that are present in the brain, and it is quite possible that each one of us, has a different, slightly different level of these compounds. And it is quite possible that differences in the endocannabinoid system, endocannabinoid-like system, can have something to do with the different personalities, and that ratios of 10 of these to 10 of others and so on will cause that. in the YouTube video The Scientist, released in 2015.

Beyond vertebrates NAEs are also found to have signaling roles in more primitive organism, implicated as metabolic signals that coordinate nutrient status and lifespan determination in Caenorhabditis elegans, and detected in organisms as diverse as yeast (Saccharomyces cerevisiae), freshwater fish (Esox lucius and Cyprinus carpio), bivalve mollusc (Mytilus galloprovincialis), protists (Tetrahymena thermophila), slime mold (Dictyostelium discoideum), microbes such as bacteria, fungi, and viruses, are all organisms that appear to regulate their endogenous NAE levels via similar enzymatic machinery as mammalian vertebrates, show a widespread occurrence of NAEs, from single-celled organisms to humans, and a highly conserved role for this group of lipids in cell signaling. Studies in amphibians and birds show that endocannabinoid signaling may function as a behavioral switch, allowing redirection from less- to more-essential behaviors in response to emergent environmental changes, and provide evidence of cannabinoid modulation of aggression, emesis, feeding behavior, locomotor activity, reproductive behaviors, vocal learning, sensory perception and stress responses.

== NAE and the reproductive system ==
Several researchers have found, that NAE, and especially 20:4 anandamide (AEA: C_{22}H_{37}NO_{2}; 20:4, ω-6), is a part of the reproductive system, and play a fundamental role for a healthy and successful pregnancy.

A 2006 report from the Pediatrics Department at Vanderbilt University characterized NAE 20:4 (AEA) as "an emerging concept in female reproduction", because they found a "cannabinoid sensor" mechanism to influence several crucial steps during early pregnancy.

The Vanderbilt research team termed this "endocannabinoid signaling in preimplantation embryo development and activation", because one of the first things the fertilized embryo must do, is to attach itself to the lining of the uterus, and without becoming attached to the uterine wall, which forms the umbilical cord, there will be no pregnancy. NAE 20:4 (AEA) plays a key role, because, for the embryo to become attached to the lining of the uterus, a particular amount (temporary reduction by high Fatty acid amide hydrolase FAAH) of NAE 20:4 (AEA), present at the uterine lining (uterine epithelium), is necessary for the fertilized embryo can attach itself to the uterine wall, i.e. implantation. NAE 20:4 (AEA) uses the CB1 receptors, that are at high levels on the blastocyst (fertilized egg), to this attachment. So, the amount of NAE 20:4 (AEA) directs the outcome of the attachment to the uterine wall via CB1, and thereby, the outcome to pregnancy, by synchronizing trophoblast differentiation and uterine preparation to the receptive state.

However, low FAAH expression and high NAE 20:4 (AEA) levels at the interimplantation sites, prior to successful implantation, have been reported, and a later possible miscarriage, as AEA levels are inversely correlated with FAAH levels in peripheral blood mononuclear cells (PMNCs) and FAAH levels are found lower in women who consequently miscarry compared with those who progress beyond the first trimester. A consequence also found in women undergoing in vitro fertilization and embryo transfer, as low activity of FAAH in PMNCs and high plasma AEA levels after embryo transfer show failure to achieve a successful pregnancy. As well, high AEA level also inhibits BeWo trophoblast cell proliferation, in a dose-dependent manner, via the CB2 receptor, suggest that FAAH acts as a barrier to the AEA maternal-fetal transfer. So, high plasma AEA levels can be used as a marker of early pregnancy loss in patients with threatened miscarriage, as altered modulation of the ECS contribute to the spontaneous pregnancy loss.

This is in line with a study of 50 women, where NAE 20:4 (AEA) hydrolase activity was lower in the seven women who miscarried than in the 43 who did not (60.43 pmol/min per mg protein [SD 29.34] vs 169.60 pmol/min per mg protein [30.20], and another study showing that all 15 women in the low AEA hydrolase group had miscarriages, compared with one of the 105 women with high concentrations at or above the threshold of hydrolase.

An earlier 2004 research into the course of ectopic pregnancy, a result of embryo retention in the fallopian tube, found that decoupled cannabinoid receptor CB1, can cause retention of embryos in the mouse oviduct, and lead to pregnancy failure, as either silencing or amplification of NAE 20:4 (AEA) signaling via CB1 receptors causes oviductal retention or blastocyst incompetence for implantation. The report estimates that aberrant cannabinoid signaling impedes coordinated oviductal smooth muscle contraction and relaxation, which are crucial to normal oviductal embryo transport. This was also seen in wild-type mice treated with methanandamide (AM-356; C_{23}H_{39}NO_{2}, 20:4, n6), and thereby concluded, that a colocalization of CB1 in the oviduct muscularis implicate a basal endocannabinoid tone of NAE 20:4 (AEA) is needed for oviductal motility and for normal journey of embryos into the uterus.

Another 2004 study published in the American Journal of Obstetrics and Gynecology find NAE 20:4 (AEA) and the phytocannabinoid Δ^{9}-tetrahydrocannabinol (THC: C_{21}H_{30}O_{2}), that can mimic NAE 20:4 (AEA) by direct activation at CB1, as the CB1 carboxyl-terminus have critical structures important for CB1 activity and regulation in the receptor life cycle including activation, desensitization, and internalization, the CB2 receptors, and markedly lowering AEA content levels, enhance the function of glycine receptors (GlyRs), activate the nuclear receptor family, peroxisome proliferator-activated receptors (PPARs), able to switch from agonist to antagonist depending on firing rate, and to protect neonatal cardiac cells against hypoxia via CB2 receptor activation by induction of NO production, to exert a direct relaxant effect on human pregnant myometrium in vitro, with equal potency for both compounds, which was mediated through the CB1 receptor. This means that the middle layer of the uterine wall, where also CB2 reseptors are expressed, is modulated by NAE 20:4 (AEA) as well.

Likewise, there is also demonstrated CB1 expression in the first trimester placenta characterized by a spatial-temporal modulation. But, at term, there is found lack of FAAH and high CB1 expression at placental villous tissue of non-laboring compared with laboring.

After birth, CB1 receptors appears to be critical for milk sucking by newborn, as it apparently activate oral-motor musculature, by 2-AG (C_{23}H_{38}O_{4}; 20:4 ω-6) in the breast milk, activation, as elevated levels of 2-AG modulate infant appetite and health, as well as NAE 20:4 (AEA) act as a neuroprotectant, also by providing retrograde signaling in the developing postnatal brain, with observations suggest that children may be less prone to psychoactive side effects of Δ^{9}-tetrahydrocannabinol (THC: C_{21}H_{30}O_{2}) or endocannabinoids than adults, as very low density of CB1, and neonatal cardiac cells express CB2, but not CB1 receptors, suggest a promising future for cannabinoids in pediatric medicine for conditions including non-organic failure-to-thrive and cystic fibrosis.

== Mood ==
As the euphoric feeling described after running, called the "runners high" is, at least in part, due to increased circulating endocannabinoids (eCBs), and these lipid signaling molecules are involved in reward, appetite, mood, memory and neuroprotection, an analysis of endocannabinoid concentrations and moods after singing, dancing, exercise and reading in healthy volunteers, showed that singing increased plasma levels of anandamide (AEA) by 42%, palmitoylethanolamine (PEA) by 53% and oleoylethanolamine (OEA) by 34%, and improved positive mood and emotions. Dancing did not affect eCB levels but decreased negative mood and emotions. Cycling increased OEA levels by 26% and reading increased OEA levels by 28%. All the ethanolamines were positively correlated with heart rate. As so, the plasma OEA levels were positively correlated with positive mood and emotions, and AEA levels were seen positively correlated with satiation.

However in posttraumatic stress disorder (PTSD), circulating NAE 20:4 (AEA) are found associated with overall mood states and exercise-induced improvements in women with and without PTSD, as AEA significantly increased following aerobic exercise for both groups, whereas the circulation of the endocannabinoid 2-AG only increased in women without PTSD, thereby AEA was associated with lower depressive mood, confusion, and total mood disturbance within the PTSD group and consistent with the discovery of a greater eCB tone, and particularly AEA, following pharmacological and/or non-pharmacological manipulations that may be beneficial for improving psychological outcomes, as mood and cognition among PTSD and possibly other psychiatric populations.

NAE and endocannabinoids is an integral component of stress recovery, both centrally and peripherally, through regulation of the HPA axis, and reduction in circulating NAE 20:4 (AEA) content in major depression, and exposure to stress, is found to increase inflammatory markers by down-regulating the circulating content of the endogenous anti-inflammatory molecules, through their activation of PPAR-α, palmitoylethanolamine (PEA: C_{18}H_{37}NO_{2}; 16:0) and Oleoylethanolamine (OEA: C_{20}H_{39}NO_{2}; 18:1, ω-9), as NAE catabolism is accelerated by stress and by the same FAAH catabolic pathway.

Administration of CB_{1} receptor antagonists to humans has been found to increase indices of depression and anxiety. Accordingly, the deficit in circulating endocannabinoids and activation of CB1, documented in individuals with major depression, may contribute to the emotional sequelae associated with this disease. And it is therefore speculated, that this reduction in circulating endocannabinoid and NAE content in depression may be associated with the increased rates of inflammation, cardiovascular disease and autoimmune dysfunction seen in this disease. And in other stress-associated psychiatric disorders, like posttraumatic stress disorder (PTSD) and borderline personality disorder (BPD), characterized by intense and rapidly changing mood states as well as chronic feelings of emptiness, impulsivity, fear of abandonment, unstable relationships, and unstable self-image, showing significantly and cronically reduced content of the NAE 20:4 (AEA) that attenuate depressive and anxious symptoms, by elevated fatty acid amide hydrolase (FAAH) in the amygdala-prefrontal cortex (PFC), that subserves emotion regulation and used to measures of hostility and aggression, provide preliminary evidence of elevated FAAH binding in PFC in any psychiatric condition, may be of great therapeutic interest to psychiatry. And consistent with the model that lower endocannabinoid tone could perturb PFC circuitry that regulates emotion and aggression, and the feeling of loneliness, as social contact increases, whereas isolation decreases, the production of the endogenous marijuanna-like neurotransmitter, NAE 20:4 (AEA) in nucleus accumbens (NAc), where activation of CB1 are necessary and sufficient to express the rewarding properties of social interactions, i.e. social contact reward.

And possible why cannabinoids are seen highly used in the prison population, and among those who have been imprisoned, and is clearly involved in daily life in prison, where detainees in some prisons estimated the current use of cannabis/hashish to be as high as 80%, and staff estimate 50%, described analgesic, calming, self-help to go through the prison experience, relieve stress, facilitate sleep, prevent violence, and a social peacemaker, where the introduction of a more restrictive regulation induced fear of violence, increased trafficking and a shift to other drug use. As seen in the Danish prisons that reflect a 'treatment guarantee' embedded in a policy of zero tolerance and intensified disciplinary sanctions, launched by the Danish Government (Regeringen, 2003) and inspired by US drug policy called The Fight against Drugs, with introduction of better fence systems, more sniffer-dogs, and cell and body search of inmates, with an increasingly repressive response to drugs, including zero tolerance and harsher punishment like isolation, that reflects the same chain of destruction as the steps seen to the Holocaust, to make clients drug free and preparing them for a life without crime.

Released to a daily life environment, where the highest scores for quality of life is observed among habitual cannabis users, followed by occasional users, whereas both non-users and dysfunctional users present less favorable score, and non-users reported more depression or anxiety symptoms and a lower quality of life, than occasional and habitual users, found in a Brazilian cross-sectional study involving more than 7400 adults (6620 recreational cannabis users and 785 non-users), even illegal. And other findings imply that a causal link between marijuana use and violence is primarily due to its illegality, and thus would not exist in an environment in which marijuana use, at least medicinally (MML), as a first choice in any situation, is legalized, to correct the injustices of cannabis prohibition, as the legalization of cannabis for adult use is found being increasingly embraced in several countries and local entities, coursed by the economic and human suffering of cannabis prohibition, which have fallen most heavily upon disadvantaged minority populations, and for countries, in which cannabis consumption before constituted a traditional habit, also in religion, and practiced for hundreds or thousands of years, without being subject to any social opprobrium, as no correlation between Marijuana use and criminal behavior are found, correlates with a reduction in homicide and assault rates, after introduction of state MML. Followed by an almost 5% estimated reduction in the total suicide rate, for the period 1990 through 2007, with an 11% percent reduction for 20- through 29-year-old males, and a 9% reduction in the suicide rate of 30- through 39-year-old males. And the secondary mortality attributing to herbal cannabis is found extremely rare, and usually associated with misadventures with law enforcement, and the prison experience and of solitary confinements.

== Longevity ==
A study of 42 eighty years old (octogenarians) humans living in the east-central mountain area of Sardinia, a High-Longevity Zone (HLZ) in Italy, have found, that the endocannabinoidome related circulating NAEs and familiar fatty acids are associated with a longer human life or longevity, as increased conjugated linoleic acid (CLA: C_{18}H_{32}O_{2}; 18:2, n-6) and heptadecanoic acid (C_{17}H_{34}O_{2}; 17:0), elevated palmitoleic acid (POA; C_{16}H_{30}O_{2}; 16:1, n-7), a conjugate acid of a palmitoleate (C_{16}H_{29}O_{2}; 16:1, n-7), where n-7 fatty acids are precursors for the production of omega-4 fatty acids like palmitolinoleic acid (16:2), and a significantly increased level of NAE 22:6 (DHEA: C_{24}H_{37}NO_{2}; 22:6, n-3), the metabolite of DHA (C_{22}H_{32}O_{2}; 22:6, n-3), and the two endocannabinoids NAE 20:4 (AEA: C_{22}H_{37}NO_{2}; 20:4, ω-6) and 2-arachidonoyl-glycerol (2-AG: C_{23}H_{38}O_{4}; 20:4, n-6), as well of increased NAE 18:1 (OEA: C_{20}H_{39}NO_{2}; 18:1, ω-9), the amide of palmitic acid (C_{16}H_{32}O_{2}; 16:0) and ethanolamine (MEA: C_{2}H_{7}NO), and increase of 2-linoleoyl-glycerol (2-LG; C_{21}H_{38}O_{4}; 18:2, n-6), derived from linoleic acid (LA: C_{18}H_{32}O_{2}; 18:2, n-6), can indicate a metabolic pattern potentially protective from adverse chronic conditions, and show a suitable physiological metabolic pattern, that may counteract the adverse stimuli leading to age-related disorders such as neurodegenerative and metabolic diseases.

It is found that 3T3-L1 adipocytes convert eicosapentaenoic acid (EPA: C_{20}H_{30}O_{2}; 20:5, ω-3) to NAE 20:5 (EPEA: C_{22}H_{35}NO_{2}; 20:5, ω-3) or Anandamide (20:5, n-3) and docosahexaenoic acid (DHA: C_{22}H_{32}O_{2}; 22:6, ω-3) to NAE 22:6 (DHEA: C_{24}H_{37}NO_{2}; 22:6, ω-3), or Anandamide (22:6, n-3). This conversion to EPEA and DHEA decrease IL-6 and MCP-1 levels, and the combined incubations with PPAR-gamma and CB2 antagonists, suggest a role of these receptors in mediating the reduction of IL-6 by DHEA. These results are in line with the hypothesis, that in addition to other pathways, this formation of NAEs may contribute to the biological activity of n-3 PUFAs, and different targets, including the endocannabinoid system, may be involved in the immune-modulating activity of fish-oil derived NAEs.

== The importance of a low ratio of omega-6 to omega-3 essential fatty acids ==
Studies have found that humans evolved on a diet with a ratio of omega-6 (n-6) to omega-3 (n-3) essential fatty acids (EFA) of about 1:1, whereas in today's Western diets the ratio is 15/1–16.7/1, or even more. The excessive amounts of n-6 polyunsaturated fatty acids (PUFA) and a very high n-6/n-3 ratio, promote the pathogenesis of many diseases, including cardiovascular disease, cancer, and inflammatory and autoimmune diseases, whereas a low n-6/n-3 ratio exert suppressive effects. However, it is found impotent, that this low ratio, should change a bit, depending on disease, as the ratio of 2.5/1 reduce rectal cell proliferation in patients with colorectal cancer, and 2–3/1 suppress inflammation in patients with rheumatoid arthritis, 4/1 is optimum for prevention of cardiovascular disease, showing a 70% decrease in total mortality, and 5/1 have a beneficial effect on patients with asthma, whereas 10/1 have adverse consequences, indicate, that the optimal 'low ratio', may vary with the specific disease.

The World Health Organization (WHO) estimate hemp, a culture CO_{2} negative, - a crop that is capable in the carbon cycle of removing more CO_{2} from the ambient than it emits, where production of biomass produce between 8 and 12 tons of CO_{2}, but seize between 10 and 15 tons per hectare, with the possibility to sequester up to 22 tons of CO_{2} from the increased dry matter of the stem, where 80% of atmospheric carbon is sequestered and stored, by a nitrogen fertilization between 0 and 120 kg per hectare, with roots that by various physicians and herbalists in the latter part of the 17th century, was recommended to treat fever, inflammation, gout, arthritis, and joint pain, as well as skin burns and hard tumors, beside more, as well as to have modest antimicrobial activity against Cryptococcus neoformans by ergost-5-en-3-ol, and potent antimicrobial activity against Escherichia coli by p-coumaroyltyramine, as having what is considered to be an optimal 3:1 balance of omega 6 to omega 3 essential fatty acids, and where hempseed oil, of which 80% are polyunsaturated fatty acids, of which 60% are omega-6 linoleic acid (LA: C_{18}H_{32}O_{2}), the precursor of NAE 20:4 (AEA) and other NAEs, and 20% are omega-3 alpha-linolenic acid (ALA: C_{18}H_{30}O_{2}), the precursor of NAE 18:3 (ALEA: C_{20}H_{35}NO_{2}; 18:3, ω-3) or Anandamide (18:3, n-3), is the only one that is in perfect balance according to what the human body needs – 3:1, and a pound (454 gram) of hemp seed, of which 43% are protein, can provide all the protein, essential fatty acids, and dietary fiber necessary for human survival for two weeks, or 33 gram a day.

And their absence has been found responsible for the development of a wide range of diseases such as metabolic disorders, cardiovascular disorders, inflammatory processes, viral infections, certain types of cancer and autoimmune disorders, as well as skin disorders, as cutaneous cannabinoid ("c[ut]annabinoid") signaling is deeply involved in the maintenance of skin homeostasis, barrier formation and regeneration, and its dysregulation is implicated to contribute to several diseases and disorders, e.g., atopic dermatitis, psoriasis, scleroderma, acne, hair growth and pigmentation disorders, keratin diseases, various tumors, and itch, as the endocannabinoids (eCBs; e.g., NAE 20:4; AEA), the eCB-responsive receptors (e.g., CB_{1}, CB_{2}), as well as the complex enzyme and transporter apparatus involved in the metabolism of the ligands, show to be expressed in several tissues, including the skin, where 18 prostanoids, 12 hydroxy-fatty acids, 9 endocannabinoids and N-acyl ethanolamides (NAEs), and 21 non-hydroxylated ceramides and sphingoid bases, of which several demonstrating significantly different expression in the tissues assayed, demonstrate the diversity of lipid mediators involved in maintaining tissue homeostasis in resting skin and hint at their contribution to signaling, cross-support, and functions of different skin compartments.

The NAE substitutes, the phytocannabinoids from the flowers and fruits, like the psychoactive compound Δ^{9}-tetrahydrocannabinol (THC: C_{21}H_{30}O_{2}) and the nonpsychotropic compounds cannabidiol (CBD: C_{21}H_{30}O_{2}), and leaves (THCA/CBDA: C_{22}H_{30}O_{4}), from the plant, are also potent PPARγ agonist with neuroprotective activity, and found to modulate inflammatory responses by regulating the production of cytokines from keratinocytes in several experimental models of skin inflammation, by CB_{2} and TRPV1 activation, where CBD dose-dependently elevates the levels of NAE 20:4 (AEA) and inhibits poly-(I:C)-induced release of MCP-2, interleukin-6 (IL-6), IL-8, and tumor necrosis factor-α, in allergic contact dermatitis (ACD), through the endocannabinoid system (ECS), and where FAAH–deficient mice, which have increased levels of NAE 20:4, displayed reduced allergic responses in the skin, as the activation of CB1 or CB2 increases endocannabinoid levels by inhibiting fatty acid amide hydrolase (FAAH) or adenylyl cyclase, and activation of CB1 is tightly associated with the generation of cellular ceramides.

Beside the CB1 receptors being triggers of the generation of ceramides that mediate neuronal cell fate, the skin CB1 receptor aktivation also increases ceramides, with long-chain fatty acids (FAs) (C22–C24), which mainly account for the formation of the epidermal barrier, through activation of ceramide synthase, CerS 2 and CerS 3, thereby resulting in the enhancement of epidermal permeability barrier function in IL-4 inflamed skin.

Synthesis of LC-PUFAs in humans and many other eukaryotes starts with:

* Linoleic acid (LA: C_{18}H_{32}O_{2}; 18:2-n6) → Δ6-desaturation (removing two hydrogen atoms, creating a double bond and a bend in the fatty acid) → γ-linolenic acid (GLA: C_{18}H_{30}O_{2}; 18:3-n6) → Δ6-specific elongase (introducing two carbons and four hydrogens) → Dihomo-gamma-linolenic acid DGLA: C_{20}H_{34}O_{2}; 20:3-n6) → Δ5-desaturase → arachidonic acid (AA: C_{20}H_{32}O_{2}; 20:4-n6) → also endocannabinoids.

* α-Linolenic acid (ALA: C_{18}H_{30}O_{2}; 18:3-n3) → Δ6-desaturation → stearidonic acid (SDA: C_{18}H_{28}O_{2}; 18:4-n3) and/or → Δ6-specific elongase → eicosatetraenoic acid (ETA: C_{20}H_{32}O_{2}; 20:4-n3) → Δ5-desaturase → eicosapentaenoic acid (EPA: C_{20}H_{30}O_{2}; 20:5-n3) → elongation and Δ6-desaturation (FADS2) → docosahexaenoic acid (DHA: C_{22}H_{32}O_{2}; 22:6-n3) → + ethanolamine (MEA: C_{2}H_{7}NO) → N-Docosahexaenoyl ethanolamine (DHEA: C_{24}H_{37}NO_{2}; 22:6, ω-3), or Anandamide (22:6, n-3) "synaptamide", is the non-oxidative produced amide, NAE 22:6.

By a Δ17-desaturase, gamma-Linolenic acid (GLA: C_{18}H_{30}O_{2}; 18:3-n6) can be further converted to stearidonic acid (SDA: C_{18}H_{28}O_{2}; 18:4-n3), dihomo-gamma-linolenic acid (DHGLA/DGLA: C_{20}H_{34}O_{2}; 20:3-n6) to eicosatetraenoic acid (ETA: C_{20}H_{32}O_{2}; 20:4-n3; omega-3 Arachidonic acid) and arachidonic acid (AA: C_{20}H_{32}O_{2}; 20:4-n6) to eicosapentaenoic acid (EPA: C_{20}H_{30}O_{2}; 20:5-n3), respectively.

- Fatty acids with at least 20 carbons (C_{20}) and three double bonds (20:3) bind to CB1 receptors.
- Arachidonic acid (AA) is also the catalyst to the formation of the two main endocannabinoids, Anandamide (AEA) and 2-Arachidonoylglycerol (2-AG).

* Anandamide (AEA: C_{22}H_{37}NO_{2}; 20:4,n-6) is an N-acylethanolamine resulting from the formal condensation of the carboxy group of arachidonic acid (AA: C_{20}H_{32}O_{2}; 20:4-n6) with the amino group of ethanolamine (C_{2}H_{7}NO), bind preferably to CB1 receptors.

* 2-Arachidonoylglycerol (2-AG: C_{23}H_{38}O_{4}; 20:4-n6) is an endogenous agonist of the cannabinoid receptors (CB1 and CB2), and the physiological ligand for the cannabinoid CB2 receptor. It is an ester formed from omega-6-arachidonic acid (AA: C_{20}H_{32}O_{2}; 20:4-n6) and glycerol (C_{3}H_{8}O_{3}), and tissue levels of 2-AG is usually several tens to several hundreds of times those of AEA.

The N-acylethanolamine synthesis pathway is one of the non-oxidative pathways in which the mainly fish oil derived n−3 long-chain polyunsaturated fatty acids (n−3 LCPUFA, C_{18} to C_{22}), ω-3 fatty acids docosahexaenoic acid (DHA: C_{22}H_{32}O_{2}; 22:6, n-3) and eicosapentaenoic acid (EPA: C_{20}H_{30}O_{2}; 20:5, n-3) are converted to NAE 22:6 docosahexaenoyl ethanolamide (DHEA: C_{24}H_{37}NO_{2}; 22:6, ω-3) and NAE 20:5 eicosapentaenoyl ethanolamide (EPEA: C_{22}H_{35}NO_{2}; 20:5, ω-3), or Anandamid (20:5, n-3), by incorporated ethanolamine (MEA: C_{2}H_{7}NO), respectively. On common diseases including cancers, this conversion show beneficial synergistic effect, when administered with the NAE-fatty acid familiar cannabinoids, like delta(9)-tetrahydrocannabinol (THC: C_{21}H_{30}O_{2}), – a metabolite of delta9-tetrahydrocannabinolic acid (THCA: C_{22}H_{30}O_{4}), a diterpenoid, with a carboxyl group (–COOH) at one end, like 11-Nor-9-carboxy-THC (THC-COOH: C_{21}H_{28}O_{4}), the secondary metabolite of THC, which is formed in the body after cannabis is consumed, that has a role as an anti-inflammatory and a neuroprotective agent, – and a non-narcotic analgesic, a hallucinogen, a cannabinoid receptor agonist and an epitope. As Cannabis sativa and their derivatives act in the organism by mimicking endogenous substances, the endocannabinoids, that activate specific cannabinoid receptors, is why cannabinoids are found to be selective antitumour compounds, that can kill tumour cells, by growth arrest or apoptosis, without affecting their non-transformed counterparts, is probably because, cannabinoid receptors regulate cell-survival and cell-death pathways differently in tumour and non-tumour cells.

== Metabolic production of NAEs ==
Diets in mammals, containing 20:4,n−6 and 22:6,n−3, are found to increase several biologically active NAEs in brain homogenates as metabolic products, like 20:4,n−6 NAE (4-fold), 20:5,n−3 NAE (5-fold), and 22:5,n−3 and 22:6,n−3 NAE (9- to 10-fold). The increase in all of the metabolic NAEs is regarded biologically important, because NAEs having fatty acids with at least 20 carbons and three double bonds bind to CB1 receptors, and endogenously released NAE 20:4 and 2-arachidonylglycerol (2-AG: C_{23}H_{38}O_{4}; 20:4,n-6), the ester metabolic formed from omega-6-arachidonic acid (AA: C_{20}H_{32}O_{2}; 20:4, n-6) and glycerol (C_{3}H_{8}O_{3}), are also found to activate CB2 receptors in addition, where 2-AG is the physiological ligand.

The hydrolysis of NAE to free fatty acid (FFA) and ethanolamine (MEA) in animals, is catalyzed by fatty acid amide hydrolase (FAAH) or by a N-acylethanolamine-hydrolyzing acid amidase (NAAA), and the polyunsaturated NAEs such as NAE 18:2, NAE 18:3, or NAE 20:4 can also be oxygenated via lipoxygenase (LOX) or cyclooxygenase (COX), to produce ethanolamide oxylipins, like prostaglandin ethanolamides (prostamide) by COX-2, with various potential bioactivities that may have enhanced affinity with cannabinoid receptors in comparison to their respective non-oxygenated NAEs, as well as to oxygenated eicosanoid ethanolamides, prostaglandins, and leukotrienes, all believed to be important signaling compounds.

The major COX-2 derived prostanoid product from NAE 20:4 (AEA) are prostaglandin E2 (PGE_{2}) ethanolamide (PGE_{2}-EA; prostamide E2) and PGD_{2} ethanolamide (PGD_{2}-EA; prostamide D2), might have many important functions, as PGE_{2} and PGD_{2} are pro-inflammatory mediators responsible for the induction of inflammation, PGE_{2}-EA and PGD_{2}-EA are contrary both growth inhibitory and can induce apoptosis, as well as that NAE 20:4 (AEA) and/or its prostamide metabolites in the renal medulla, may represent medullipin and function as a regulator of body fluid and the mean arterial pressure (MAP).

Fatty acid amide hydrolase (FAAH) is the main degrading enzyme of NAE 20:4 (AEA) and NAE 18:1 (OEA), which have opposite effects on food intake and energy balance. AEA, an endogenous ligand of CB1 cannabinoid receptors, enhances food intake and energy storage, whereas OEA binds to peroxisome proliferator-activated receptors-α to reduce food intake and promoting lipolysis, thereby FAAH deficiency promotes energy storage and enhances the motivation for food, through the enhancement of AEA levels rather than promoting the anorexic effects of OEA. Tetrahydrocannabinol (THC: C_{21}H_{30}O_{2}) is found to lower production of NAE 20:4 (AEA) and 2-AG, that is synthesized in an on-demand manner when needed for activation, by a biphasic response after THC injection reaching maximal values at 30 min., where AEA increased slightly from 0.58 ± 0.21 ng/ml at baseline to 0.64 ± 0.24 ng/ml, and 2-AG from 7,60 ± 4,30 ng/ml to 9,50 ± 5,90 ng/ml, and after reaching maximal concentrations, EC plasma levels decreased markedly to a nadir of 300 min after THC administration to 0.32 ± 0.15 ng/ml for AEA, and 5,50 ± 3,01 ng/ml for 2-AG, and returned to near baseline levels until 48 hours after the experiment, in 25 healthy volunteers who received a large intravenous dose of THC (0.10 mg/kg).

Insulin medication and intraoperative doses of insulin is also found, but not recognized by companies producing and selling medication to general public also as a slimming formula like Wegovy, to get its anorectic effect by the involvement of FAAH activity, which, beside of other NAE's, degrade NAE 20:4 (AEA), suggest that insulin may play a key role in the obesity-linked dysregulation of the adipose ECS at the gene level. And is possible why the European Medicines Agency (EMA) in 2023 are investigating several reports from European countries about suicidal thoughts and thoughts of self-harm in patients, who have been treated with Novo Nordisk's popular medicines for obesity and diabetes. An outcome also seen in the CB1 receptor blocker rimonabant, an anorectic antiobesity drug that was first approved in Europe in 2006 but was withdrawn worldwide in 2008 due to serious psychiatric side effects, and happening at the same time as EMA, has raised a safety alert for Wegovy, that also applies to the companies diabetes medication Ozempic, based on a study that suggests that the active substance in the two preparations, can increase the risk of thyroid cancer in patients with type 2 diabetes.

FAAH expression, that metabolizes NAE 20:4 (AEA) involved in the regulation of emotional reactivity, into ethanolamine and arachidonic acid, is found significantly increased in depressive-like phenotypes, where knockout or pharmacological inhibition of FAAH effectively reduces depressive-like behavior, with a dose-dependent effect, that elicits anxiolytic and antidepressant-like effects, like the NAE 20:4 (AEA) substitutes ∆^{9}-THC and other cannabinoids that may contribute to the overall mood-elevating properties of cannabis, and differences in FAAH expression in depressive-like phenotypes were largely localized to animal prefrontal cortex (PFC), hippocampus and striatum, containing high densities of CB1 receptors. As well as FAAH levels in amygdala and PFC are elevated in borderline personality disorder, which relates to the hostility and aggression, are consistent with the model, that lower endocannabinoid tone perturb PFC circuitry that regulates emotion and aggression, provide preliminary evidence of elevated PFC FAAH binding in any psychiatric condition.

A FAAH 385A mutant alleles have been found to have a direct effect on elevated plasma levels of NAE 20:4 (AEA) and related NAEs in humans, and biomarkers that may indicate risk for severe obesity that suggest novel ECS obesity treatment strategies, as leptin increases the FAAH activity and reduces NAE 20:4 (AEA) signaling, particularly within the hypothalamus, to promote a suppression of food intake, a mechanism that is lost in diet-induced obesity and modulated by a human genetic variant (C385A) of the FAAH gene. The cannabinoid type 1 receptors (CB1) and their endogenous ligands, the endocannabinoids, present in peripheral organs, such as liver, white adipose tissue, muscle, and pancreas, where it regulate lipid and glucose homeostasis, and dysregulation of it, has been associated with the development of obesity, characterized by chronic mild inflammation, and its sequelae, such as dyslipidemia and diabetes, are involved in modulating food intake and the motivation to consume palatable food.

NAE 20:4 related THC treatment have shown to increase culture protein content and reduced methyl-(3)H-thymidine incorporation, and cells treated with THC underwent adipogenesis shown by the expression of PPARγ and had increased lipid accumulation. Basal and IP-stimulated lipolyses were also inhibited by THC, and the effects on methyl-(3)H-thymidine incorporation and lipolysis seem to be mediated through CB1- and CB2-dependent pathways. THC did also decrease NAPE-PLD, the enzyme that catalyzes and converts ordinary lipids into chemical signals like NAE 20:4 (AEA) and NAE 18:1 (OEA), in preadipocytes and increased adiponectin and TGFβ transcription in adipocytes, results that show the ECS interferes with adipocyte biology and may contribute to adipose tissue (AT) remodeling. And this stimulation of adiponectin production and inhibition of lipolysis from THC may be in favor of improved insulin sensitivity under cannabinoid influence.

A full agonist at the CB_{1} receptor is found able to up-regulate PPARy, and increased (+50%) glucose uptake, the translocation of glucose transporter 4, and intracellular calcium in fat cells, that indicate a role for the local endocannabinoids in the regulation of glucose metabolism in human adipocytes and suggest a role in channelling excess energy fuels to adipose tissue in obese humans. This is consistent with the decreased prevalence of diabetes seen in marijuana users, and significantly reduced body mass index (BMI) and rates of obesity in Cannabis users, as endocannabinoids modulate pancreatic β-cells function, proliferation, and survival, as well as insulin production, secretion, and resistance, where animal and human research suggest that increased activity of the endocannabinoid system, may lead to insulin resistance, glucose intolerance and obesity.

Consistent with the associated reduced prevalence of non-alcoholic fatty liver disease (NAFLD) among cannabis users, that find significantly lower NAFLD prevalence compared to non-users, i.e. 15% lower in non-dependent users and 52% lower in dependent users, and dependent patients had 43% significantly lower prevalence of NAFLD compared to non-dependent patients. And also by using multivariable logistic regression, and after adjusting for potential confounders, patients with cannabis abuse (daily consumption) is found 55% less likely to have hepatocellular carcinoma (adjusted odds ratio, 0.45, 95% confidence interval, 0.42–0.49) compared with patients without cannabis abuse in the period 2002 – 2014.

In addition to metabolism by FAAH, COX-2 and LOXs, NAE 20:4 (AEA) can also undergo oxidation by several of human cytochrome P450 (CYPs) enzymes, resulting in various oxidized lipid species, some of which have biological relevance as CYP-derived epoxides, that can act as a potent agonist of CB2 receptors.

NAE 20:4 (AEA: C_{22}H_{37}NO_{2}) which is similar in structure to N-arachidonoyl glycine (Nagly: C_{22}H_{35}NO_{3} – a carboxylic acid COOH) are metabolically interconnected, as oxidation of the hydroxyl group of NAE 20:4 (AEA) leads to NAgly, preferring G-protein coupled receptor (GPR) 118, with a molecular structure, that are found of pharmacological interest, as region one confers a high degree of specificity of action, as polyunsaturated residues produce molecules with analgesic and anti-inflammatory action, of which saturated structures, are inactive. Region two is related to metabolic stability as NAgly is degraded by FAAH activity. And last, region 3, the amino acid residue, can have an effect on the analgesic and anti-inflammatory activities depending on steric factors and the chiral nature of the amino acid. Also the amino acid residue at 296 and the hydroxyl groups of THC, 11-hydroxy-THC (11-OH-THC: C_{21}H_{30}O_{3}) are critical for potentiation of glycine receptors (GlyRs) and for some of the cannabis-induced analgesic and therapeutic effects.

It is also found that long-chain fatty acid conjugates from the metabolic hydroxyl oxidation product of the phytocannabinoid, THC (C_{21}H_{30}O_{2}), 11-hydroxy-THC (11-OH-THC: C_{21}H_{30}O_{3}) are proposed to be a form in which THC may be stored within tissues. And the last cytochrome P450 oxidation product of THC afford the non-psychoactive and long-living 11-nor-9-carboxy-THC (THC-COOH: C_{21}H_{28}O_{4}) as main metabolite, that in some authors' opinion, are insufficiently characterized, as an acid metabolite seen as a final product in both cannabis-plants and mammals, with their main unanswered questions, "Could any of the pharmacological effects observed for THC be attributed to THCA (C_{22}H_{30}O_{4}) and/or THC-COOH, and could THC also be a potential pro-drug to another pharmacological entity?".

NSAIDs that inhibit COX2, may find its medical influence from the cannabinoid system, either by inhibiting the breakdown of NAE 20:4 (AEA) by FAAH (i.e. ibuprofen, indomethacin, flurbiprofen, ibu–am5), or by inhibiting a possible intracellular transporter of endocannabinoids (i.e. acetaminophen).

The phytocannabinoid THC is found to have twenty times the anti-inflammatory potency of aspirin and twice that of hydrocortisone, but in contrast to NSAIDs, it demonstrates no COX inhibition at physiological concentrations.

Another of the main phytocannabinoids, cannabidiol (CBD: C_{21}H_{30}O_{2}) is found to produce a significant increase in serum NAE 20:4 (AEA) levels, by inhibiting the intracellular degradation catalyzed by FAAH, suggest the inhibition of NAE 20:4 (AEA) deactivation may contribute to the antipsychotic effects of CBD, potentially representing a mechanism in the treatment of schizophrenia, with a markedly superior side-effect profile, compare to amisulpride, a potent antipsychotic. CBD were also seen to elevate serum levels of the non-cannabimimetic lipid mediators, NAE 16:0 (PEA) and NAE 18:1 (OEA), but amisulpride did not.

FAAH inhibitors are seen to both increase alcohol consumption (NAE 20:4; AEA) and prevent against oxidative stress caused by binge ethanol consumption, and as NAE 16:0 (PEA) and NAE 18:1 (OEA), through the endocannabinoidome-related peroxisome proliferator-activated receptor-α (Ppar-α) is involved in the actions of NAEs with no endocannabinoid activity, have been reported to exhibit neuroprotective effects, suggest a strengthening of the ECS may reflect a homeostatic mechanism to prevent the neurotoxic effects induced by alcohol with a relevant role of other non-cannabinoid congeners in the alcohol exposure, and the further activation in response to the negative affective state, like the anxiety, associated to alcohol withdrawal. Or poorer recall of verbal and nonverbal information, as well as reduced visuospatial skills related to alcohol hangover and withdrawal symptoms in youth, a relationship not seen in adolescents with similar levels of alcohol involvement if they are heavy users of marijuana.

The cannabinoid CB1 receptor play a critical role in mediating the adolescent behavior, because enhanced CB1 density and endocannabinoid (eCB) signaling occur transiently during the period from childhood to adolescence and reverse when adult and mature in normal phenotypes. Reports on enhanced adolescent CB1 signaling, suggest a pivotal role for the CB1 in an adolescent brain as an important molecular mediator of adolescent behavior, as adult CB1 mutant rats exhibit an adolescent-like phenotype with typical high risk seeking, impulsivity, and augmented drug and nondrug reward sensitivity, by an instinctive need or call for activation, and partial inhibition of CB1 activity normalized behavior and led to an adult phenotype, is why it is concluded that the activity state and functionality of the CB1 is critical for mediating adolescent behavior and further turn to an adult phenotype, by normal CB1 downscaling. This is also due to the cannabinoid system and its neurotransmitter NAE 20:4 (AEA), that highly participate in the modulation of human states and appropriate human emotional responses by activation of the CB1 receptor, also found in frontal neocortical areas, subserving higher cognitive and executive functions, and in the posterior cingulate, a region pivotal for consciousness and higher cognitive processing.

Acute administration of ethanol inhibits receptor-mediated release of NAE 20:4 (AEA), whereas chronic ethanol administration increases levels of AEA that participates in the neuroadaptations associated with chronic ethanol exposure, as the inhibition of AEA release by acute ethanol administration, not derive from increased fatty acid ethanolamide degradation by FAAH.

However, alcohol (EtOH) is seen to increase levels of NAE 20:4 (AEA), and its precursor N‐arachidonoylphosphatidylethanolamine (N‐ArPE), a glycero-phospho-ethanolamine, significantly, that may be a mechanism for neuronal adaptation and serve as a compensatory mechanism to counteract a continuous presence of EtOH, that together with previous results indicate the involvement of the endocannabinoid system in mediating some of the pharmacological actions alleged of EtOH, also seen in red wine components, and in Humulus lupulus to preserve and flavor beer, widely cultivated for use by the brewing industry, through caryophyllene, a dietary cannabinoid, that is a selective full agonist at CB2 and also act through PPAR nuclear receptors (i.e. PPARα and PPARγ), with countless beneficial and non-psychoactive effects, that may constitute part of a common brain pathway mediating reinforcement of drugs of abuse including EtOH, by elevated CB1. The CB1 receptor binding is 20-30% lower in patients with alcohol dependence than in control subjects in all brain regions and is negatively correlated with years of alcohol abuse, and the CB1 receptor binding remain similarly reduced after 2–4 weeks of abstinence, suggests an involvement of CB1 receptors in alcohol dependence in humans.

Similar pathways of hydrolysis or oxidation of NAEs are also found in plant cells.

== NAE system in plants ==
N-acylethanolamines (NAEs), constitute a class of lipid compounds naturally present in both animal and plant membranes, as constituents of the membrane-bound phospholipid, N-Acylphosphatidylethanolamine (NAPE). NAPE is composed of a third fatty acid moiety linked to the amino head group of the commonly occurring membrane phospholipid, phosphatidylethanolamine.

A study in 2000 find, that higher plants use defense signaling, to combat cellular stressful situations (homeostasis), like in osmotic stress, where high levels of NAEs after a period of dehydration, are metabolized fast during the first few hours of imbibition, and in response to pathogen elicitors, that lead to signal transduction and membrane protection, in the same way as several mammalian cell types, coupled to endocannabinoid signaling, do, by releasing saturated and unsaturated long-chain NAEs, and saturated medium-chain NAEs, that can act as lipid mediators to modulate ion flux and activate defense gene expression.

The levels of NAEs increases 10- to 50-fold in tobacco (Nicotiana tabacum) leaves treated with fungal elicitors, as a protection against it, by producing the N-myristoylethanolamine (Myristamide-MEA: C_{16}H_{33}NO_{2}; NAE 14:0), that specific binds to a protein in tobacco membranes with biochemical properties appropriate for the physiological responses, and it do not show identical binding properties to NAE-binding proteins in intact tobacco microsomes, compared to non-intact microsomes. In addition to this, antagonists of mammalian CB receptors was seen to block both of the biological activities previously attributed to NAE 14:0, this endogenous NAE that is accumulated in tobacco cell suspensions and leaves after pathogen elicitor perception, is why it is proposed, that plants possess an NAE-signaling pathway with functional similarities to the "endocannabinoid" pathway of animal systems, and this pathway, in part, participates in xylanase elicitor perception in the tobacco plant, as well as in the Arabidopsis and Medicago truncatula plant tissues.

== Medical values ==
N-acylethanolamines (NAEs), with its cell-protective and stress-combating action-response of organisms, also produced in neurons, together with N-acyl-phosphatidylethanolamine (NAPE), in response to the high intracellular Ca^{2+} concentrations that occur in injured neurons, have shown promise as therapeutic potential in treating bacterial, fungal, and viral infections, as NAEs also exhibit anti-inflammatory, antibacterial, and antiviral properties, which have considerable application potential.

In pediatric medicine for conditions including "non-organic failure-to-thrive" and cystic fibrosis. A dysfunction of the endocannabinoid system is researched for a possible determining factor for causing infertility in cystic fibrosis (CF), as the illness is associated with an imbalance of fatty acids, show that mild stimulation of the endocannabinoid system (CB1 and CB2) in infancy and adolescence, appears to normalize many reproductive processes and prevent infertility in CF males. The mild stimulated, were fully fertile, producing offspring comparable by the number of litters and the number of pups as the wild-type mice, and their counterparts, not treated, were shown completely infertile.

As NAE related Cannabis has an ancient tradition of usage as a medicine in obstetrics and gynecology, its extracts, may represent an efficacious and safe alternative for treatment of a wide range of conditions in women including dysmenorrhea, dysuria, hyperemesis gravidarum, and menopausal symptoms.

It has been found that social contact increases, whereas isolation decreases, the production of the endogenous marijuanna-like neurotransmitter, NAE 20:4 (AEA), in nucleus accumbens (NAc), which regulate motivated behavior, and this NAE 20:4 (AEA) production is via oxytocin, the neuropeptide reinforcing parental and social bonding. Activation of CB1 cannabinoid receptors in NAc, are necessary and sufficient to express the rewarding properties of social interactions, i.e. social contact reward. In addition, CB1 activation also suppresses release of serotonin, dopamine, acetylcholine and noradrenaline, which are mediating the characteristic cognitive and antidepressant effects. As well as norepinephrine release, as it is suggested that a major function of the ECS also lies in buffering the symphatico-adrenergic response to stress.

To use in expected global heating scenario, in a catastrophic "hothouse Earth," possible well beyond the control of humans, where "wet bulb temperatures," taken by a thermometer wrapped in a wet cloth, show temperatures of 35C or higher, and considered the limit to human survival and heighten humidity makes it harder for people to cool down via sweating, coursed by the pollution of the troposphere, that tight holds 99% of human made solid particle pollution, and keeps CO_{2} in it for more than 100 years, for citizens who can't afford an air-condition unit, to cool down and prevent heatstroke with an elevated core body temperature above 40 °C with neurologic dysfunctions, that can lead to a syndrome of multiple organ defect, and cell stress, as it is found, that the CB1 receptor activation, here by a phytocannabinoid Δ9-THC administration, induces profound hypothermia, that is rapid in onset, persistent for 3–4 hours, dose-dependent and is accompanied by a reduction in oxygen (O) consumption, which indicate reduced heat production, as opposed to increased heat loss.

* → THCA:COOH: C_{22}H_{30}O_{4} (heating/storage) → THC: C_{21}H_{30}O_{2} → THC-OH: C_{21}H_{30}O_{3} → THC:COOH: C_{21}H_{28}O_{4} → profound hypothermia, a lowering of body temperature, accompanied by a reduction in oxygen consumption.

In metabolism of THCA from fresh plant material used orally, is conversion to Delta9-THC not observed:

THCA:COOH: C_{22}H_{30}O_{4} → THC-OH: C_{21}H_{30}O_{3} → THC:COOH: C_{21}H_{28}O_{4}

To be protected where head injury is a possibility, as a positive THC screen is associated with significant decreased mortality in adult patients sustaining traumatic brain injury (TBI), as research work, by a 3-year retrospective review of registry data at a Level I center of patients sustaining TBI, find mortality in the THC(+) group (2.4% [2 patients]) significantly decreased compared with the THC(-) group (11.5% [42]) in 446 cases meeting all inclusion criteria. And further have shorter hospital length of stay (LOS) and shorter ventilator days, than THC(-) patients sustaining TBI. For severely injured trauma patients with Injury Severity Score ≥16, a THC(+) screen show significantly lower intensive care unit LOS and mortality (19.3% versus 25.0%) than THC(-) patients, shown by 4849 patients included at two large regional trauma centers between 2014 and 2018.

Since the fatty acid amide hydrolase (FAAH) has shown significant decrease in bhang users as compared to controls, and decrease in FAAH protein level is closely related to the duration of bhang use, and bhang–induced immunotoxicity could be attributed to decrease in FAAH protein, bhang might be a healthy drink/preparation to suppress an overactive immune response.

Fatty acid amide hydrolase (FAAH) inhibition has been found neuroprotective with therapeutic potential against neuropathological states including traumatic brain injury, Alzheimer's, Huntington's, and Parkinson's diseases, and stroke.

A molecular mechanism through which NAE 20:4 (AEA) plant competitive substitute THC cannabinoid molecules can affect the development of Alzheimer's disease, the leading cause of dementia, or its impact:

THC: C_{21}H_{30}O_{2} → THC-OH: C_{21}H_{30}O_{3} → THC:COOH: C_{21}H_{28}O_{4} → a significantly superior inhibitor of Amyloid beta (Aβ) aggregation and tau phosphorylation, compared to approved drugs prescribed for the treatment of Alzheimer's disease in 2008, through which these molecules directly can affect the development by activation of both CB1 and CB2 receptors, which inhibit the enzyme acetylcholinesterase (AChE), which further prevent AChE-induced amyloid β-peptide (Aβ) aggregation, as they also are able to bind to the anionic site of AChE, a region involved in and critical for amyloid formation, as well as by promoting the brain's intrinsic repair mechanisms, and promote neurogenesis, endocannabinoid signaling has demonstrated to modulate numerous concomitant pathological processes, including neuroinflammation, excitotoxicity, mitochondrial dysfunction, and oxidative stress. However other phytochemicals that are present in Cannabis sativa is found to interact with each other in a synergistic fashion, called the entourage effect, that seems to have greater therapeutic potential when administered together, rather than individually.

A synergistic outcome that also show different cannabinoids can be effective against harmful bacteria including those that are resistant to common antibiotics, like Methicillin-resistant Staphylococcus aureus (MRSA) causing various types of life-threatening infections, such as septic shock, endocarditis and severe pneumonia, coursed by the misuse of antibiotics, which is the leading cause of the emergence of antibiotic-resistant bacteria. They do so by inhibit the formation of biofilms and also eradicate pre-existing ones, was showcased in 1976, where it was discovered that THC and CBD can be used as bacteriostatic agents and are able to kill a panel of human pathogenic strains, and later a panel of cannabinoids are found able to do the same in different bacteria strains.

Different medication and intervention regimes, and lifestyle modifications, like diet, weight control, exercise, mindfulness as yoga and meditation, and the use of psychoactive substances, like alcohol, tobacco, coffee, and cannabis, beside general anaesthesia regimens (i.e. propofol, etomidate, sevoflurane, isoflurane, sufentanil), and Insulin medication and intraoperative doses of insulin, etc, do also modulate it, either by being a FAAH inhibitor, that blocks the breakdown of NAE 20:4 (AEA), and/or enhance or lowering its production, and/or by activate or inactivate the receptors connected, as arachidonic acid (C_{20}H_{32}O_{2}; 20:4, ω-6), the precursor of NAE 20:4 (AEA) and other eCBs, is present in every cell membrane of the body, and their on demand synthesis is regulated by electrical activity and calcium (Ca^{2+}) shifts.

== See also ==
- Fatty acid desaturase
- Retrograde signaling
- Endocannabinoid system
- Cannabis in pregnancy
- Evolutionary history of life
- Evolutionary history of plants
- Hemp seed oil
- Hemp seed protein
- COX-2 inhibitors
