= Endocannabinoid system =

Biological system of neurotransmitters

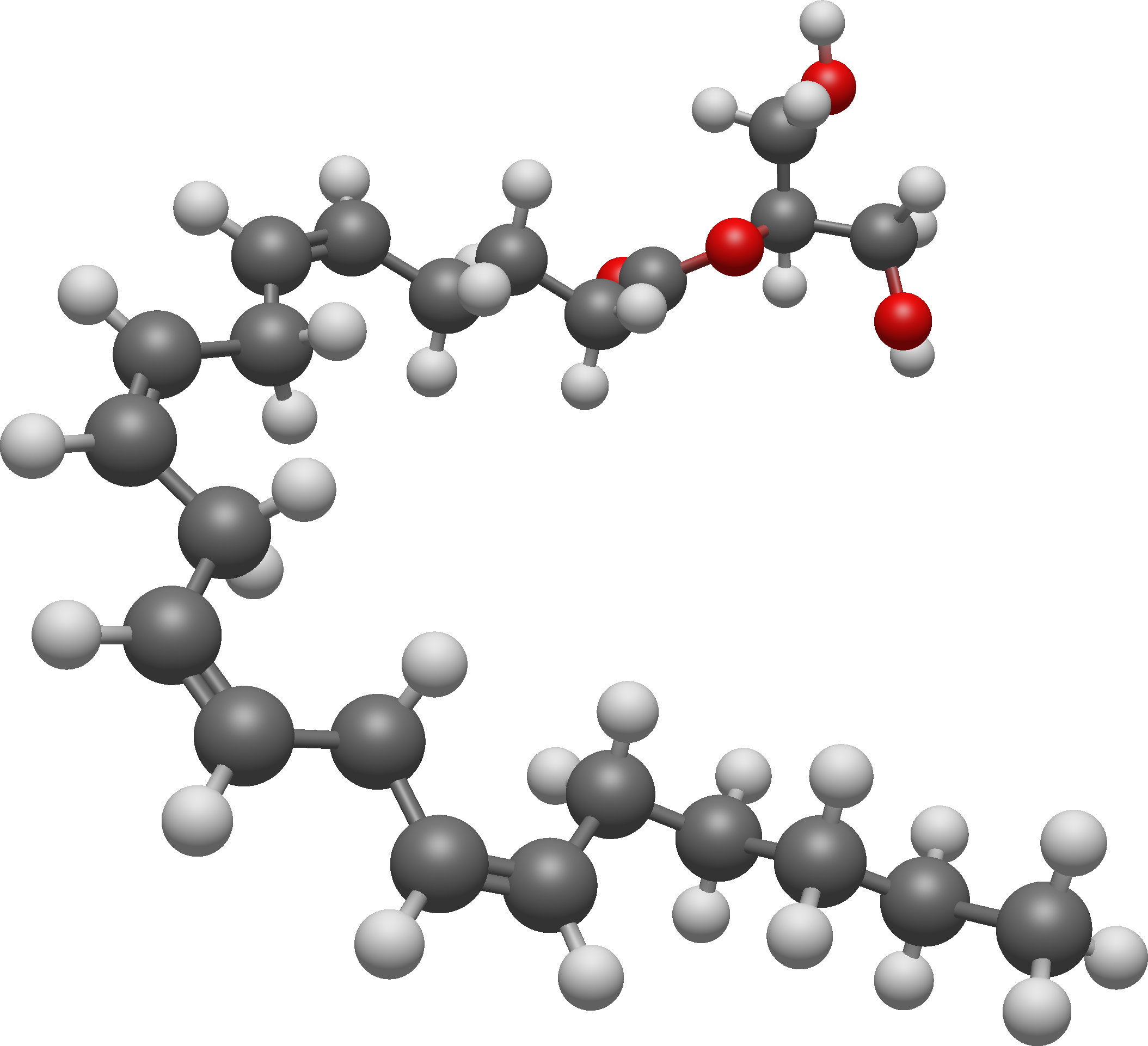
3D model of 2-Arachidonoylglycerol, an endocannabinoid

The endocannabinoid system (ECS) is a biological system composed of endocannabinoids, which are neurotransmitters that bind to cannabinoid receptors, and cannabinoid receptor proteins that are expressed throughout the central nervous system (including the brain) and peripheral nervous system. It is found in animals as simple as hydras, but absent in insects, who are hypothesized to have lost it due to a lack of arachidonic acid. The endocannabinoid system is still not fully understood, but may be involved in regulating physiological and cognitive processes, including fertility, pregnancy, pre- and postnatal development, various activity of immune system, appetite, pain-sensation, mood, and memory, and in mediating the pharmacological effects of cannabis. The ECS plays an important role in multiple aspects of neural functions, including the control of movement and motor coordination, learning and memory, emotion and motivation, addictive-like behavior and pain modulation, among others.

Two primary cannabinoid receptors have been identified: CB_{1}, first cloned (or isolated) in 1990; and CB_{2}, cloned in 1993. CB_{1} receptors are found predominantly in the brain and nervous system, as well as in peripheral organs and tissues, and are the main molecular target of the fatty-acid neurotransmitter anandamide, as well as the most known active component of cannabis, tetrahydrocannabinol (THC). Another endocannabinoid, 2-arachidonoylglycerol (2-AG), also interacts with both CB receptors. It is significantly more abundant in the mammalian brain than anandamide, exceeding it by two to three orders of magnitude.

The endocannabinoid system is sometimes called the endocannabinoidome or the expanded endocannabinoid system, as it includes a broader range of lipid mediators, receptors, and enzymes beyond CB_{1} and CB_{2}.

== Basic overview ==
The endocannabinoid system, broadly speaking, includes:

- Endocannabinoids, which are the physiological ligands, or connecting substances, for the cannabinoid receptors. The main endocannabinoids are anandamide (N-arachidonoylethanolamide) and 2-AG (2-arachidonoylglycerol), which are in the same class of chemical compounds, called N-acylethanolamines (NAEs). Endocannabinoids are all eicosanoids, another class of compound.
- The enzymes that synthesize (create) and degrade (break down) the endocannabinoids, including fatty acid amide hydrolase and monoacylglycerol lipase.
- The cannabinoid receptors CB_{1} and CB_{2}, two G protein-coupled receptors that are located in the central and peripheral nervous systems.

The neurons, neural pathways, and other cells where these molecules, enzymes, and one or both cannabinoid receptor types are all localized together collectively comprise the endocannabinoid system.

The endocannabinoid system has been studied using genetic and pharmacological methods. These studies have revealed that cannabinoids act as neuromodulators, or regulators of many neurons and neural signals, for a variety of processes, including motor learning, appetite, and pain sensation, among other cognitive and physical processes. The CB1 receptor in the endocannabinoid system shows significant overlap with the orexinergic projection system, a network of hypothalamic projections that regulate many of the same physical and cognitive functions. Moreover, CB1 is colocalized on orexin projection neurons in the lateral hypothalamus and many output structures of the orexin system, where the CB1 and orexin receptor 1 (OX1) receptors physically and functionally join to form the CB1–OX1 receptor heterodimer.

=== Expression of receptors ===
Cannabinoid binding sites exist throughout the central and peripheral nervous systems. The two most relevant receptors for cannabinoids are the CB_{1} and CB_{2} receptors, which are expressed predominantly in the brain and immune system respectively. Density of expression varies based on species and correlates with the efficacy that cannabinoids will have in modulating specific aspects of behavior related to the site of expression. For example, in rodents, the highest concentration of cannabinoid binding sites are in the basal ganglia and cerebellum, regions of the brain involved in the initiation and coordination of movement. In humans, cannabinoid receptors exist in much lower concentration in these regions, which helps explain why cannabinoids possess a greater efficacy in altering rodent motor movements than they do in humans.

A recent analysis of cannabinoid binding in CB_{1} and CB_{2} receptor knockout mice found cannabinoid responsiveness even when these receptors were not being expressed, indicating that an additional binding receptor may be present in the brain. Binding has been demonstrated by 2-arachidonoylglycerol (2-AG) on the TRPV1 receptor suggesting that this receptor may be a candidate for the established response.

In addition to CB1 and CB2, certain orphan receptors are known to bind endocannabinoids as well, including GPR18, GPR55 (a regulator of neuroimmune function), and GPR119. CB1 has also been noted to form a functional human receptor heterodimer in orexin neurons with OX1, the CB1–OX1 receptor, which mediates feeding behavior and certain physical processes such as cannabinoid-induced pressor responses which are known to occur through signaling in the rostral ventrolateral medulla.

=== Endocannabinoid synthesis, release, and degradation ===
During neurotransmission, the pre-synaptic neuron releases neurotransmitters into the synaptic cleft which bind to cognate receptors expressed on the post-synaptic neuron. Based upon the interaction between the transmitter and receptor, neurotransmitters may trigger a variety of effects in the post-synaptic cell, such as excitation, inhibition, or the initiation of second messenger cascades. Based on the cell, these effects may result in the on-site synthesis of endogenous cannabinoids anandamide or 2-AG by a process that is not entirely clear, but results from an elevation in intracellular calcium. Expression appears to be exclusive, so that both types of endocannabinoids are not co-synthesized. This exclusion is based on synthesis-specific channel activation: a recent study found that in the bed nucleus of the stria terminalis, calcium entry through voltage-sensitive calcium channels produced an L-type current resulting in 2-AG production, while activation of mGluR1/5 receptors triggered the synthesis of anandamide.

Evidence suggests that the depolarization-induced influx of calcium into the post-synaptic neuron causes the activation of an enzyme called transacylase. This enzyme is suggested to catalyze the first step of endocannabinoid biosynthesis by converting phosphatidylethanolamine, a membrane-resident phospholipid, into N-acyl-phosphatidylethanolamine (NAPE). Experiments have shown that phospholipase D cleaves NAPE to yield anandamide. This process is mediated by bile acids. In NAPE-phospholipase D (NAPEPLD)-knockout mice, cleavage of NAPE is reduced in low calcium concentrations, but not abolished, suggesting multiple, distinct pathways are involved in anandamide synthesis. The synthesis of 2-AG is less established and warrants further research.

Once released into the extracellular space by a putative endocannabinoid transporter, messengers are vulnerable to glial cell inactivation. Endocannabinoids are taken up by a transporter on the glial cell and degraded by fatty acid amide hydrolase (FAAH), which cleaves anandamide into arachidonic acid and ethanolamine or monoacylglycerol lipase (MAGL), and 2-AG into arachidonic acid and glycerol. While arachidonic acid is a substrate for leukotriene and prostaglandin synthesis, it is unclear whether this degradative byproduct has unique functions in the central nervous system. Emerging data in the field also points to FAAH being expressed in postsynaptic neurons complementary to presynaptic neurons expressing cannabinoid receptors, supporting the conclusion that it is major contributor to the clearance and inactivation of anandamide and 2-AG after endocannabinoid reuptake. A neuropharmacological study demonstrated that an inhibitor of FAAH (URB597) selectively increases anandamide levels in the brain of rodents and primates. Such approaches could lead to the development of new drugs with analgesic, anxiolytic-like and antidepressant-like effects, which are not accompanied by overt signs of abuse liability.

=== Binding and intracellular effects ===
Cannabinoid receptors are G-protein coupled receptors located on the pre-synaptic membrane. While there have been some papers that have linked concurrent stimulation of dopamine and CB_{1} receptors to an acute rise in cyclic adenosine monophosphate (cAMP) production, it is generally accepted that CB_{1} activation via cannabinoids causes a decrease in cAMP concentration by inhibition of adenylyl cyclase and a rise in the concentration of mitogen-activated protein kinase (MAP kinase). The relative potency of different cannabinoids in inhibition of adenylyl cyclase correlates with their varying efficacy in behavioral assays. This inhibition of cAMP is followed by phosphorylation and subsequent activation of not only a suite of MAP kinases (p38/p42/p44), but also the PI3/PKB and MEK/ERK pathway. Results from rat hippocampal gene chip data after acute administration of tetrahydrocannabinol (THC) showed an increase in the expression of transcripts encoding myelin basic protein, endoplasmic proteins, cytochrome oxidase, and two cell adhesion molecules: NCAM, and SC1; decreases in expression were seen in both calmodulin and ribosomal RNAs. In addition, CB1 activation has been demonstrated to increase the activity of transcription factors like c-Fos and Krox-24.

=== Binding and neuronal excitability ===
The molecular mechanisms of the endocannabinoid system are primarily concerned with certain voltage-gated and ligand-gated channels, which can be directly affected by cannabinoids. More specifically, cannabinoids reduce calcium influx by blocking the activity of certain calcium channels, called voltage-dependent N-, P/Q- and L-type calcium channels. This reduction in activity means that depolarization of affected cells is less likely to occur, and thus neural signalling is reduced. In addition to acting on calcium channels, activation of Gi/o and Gs, the two most commonly coupled G-proteins to cannabinoid receptors, has been shown to modulate potassium channel activity. Recent studies have found that CB_{1} activation specifically facilitates potassium ion flux through GIRKs, a family of potassium channels. Immunohistochemistry experiments demonstrated that CB_{1} is co-localized with GIRK and Kv1.4 potassium channels, suggesting that these two may interact in physiological contexts.

In the central nervous system, CB_{1} receptors influence neuronal excitability, reducing the incoming synaptic input. This mechanism, known as presynaptic inhibition, occurs when a postsynaptic neuron releases endocannabinoids in retrograde transmission, which then bind to cannabinoid receptors on the presynaptic terminal. CB_{1} receptors then reduce the amount of neurotransmitter released, so that subsequent excitation in the presynaptic neuron results in diminished effects on the postsynaptic neuron. It is likely that presynaptic inhibition uses many of the same ion channel mechanisms listed above, although recent evidence has shown that CB_{1} receptors can also regulate neurotransmitter release by a non-ion channel mechanism, i.e., through Gi/o-mediated inhibition of adenylyl cyclase and protein kinase A. Direct effects of CB_{1} receptors on membrane excitability have been reported, and strongly impact the firing of cortical neurons. A series of behavioral experiments demonstrated that NMDAR, an ionotropic glutamate receptor, and the metabotropic glutamate receptors (mGluRs) work in concert with CB_{1} to induce analgesia in mice, although the mechanism underlying this effect is unclear.

== Potential functions ==
=== Memory ===
Mice treated with THC show suppression of long-term potentiation in the hippocampus, a process that is essential for the formation and storage of long-term memory. These results may concur with anecdotal evidence suggesting that smoking cannabis impairs short-term memory. Consistent with this finding, mice without the CB_{1} receptor show enhanced memory and long-term potentiation indicating that the endocannabinoid system may play a pivotal role in the extinction of old memories. One study found that the high-dose treatment of rats with the synthetic cannabinoid HU-210 over several weeks resulted in stimulation of neural growth in the rats' hippocampus region, a part of the limbic system playing a part in the formation of declarative and spatial memories, but did not investigate the effects on short-term or long-term memory. Taken together, these findings suggest that the effects of endocannabinoids on the various brain networks involved in learning and memory may vary.

==== Role in hippocampal neurogenesis ====
In the adult brain, the endocannabinoid system facilitates the neurogenesis of hippocampal granule cells. In the subgranular zone of the dentate gyrus, multipotent neural progenitors (NP) give rise to daughter cells that, over the course of several weeks, mature into granule cells whose axons project to and synapse onto dendrites on the CA3 region. NPs in the hippocampus have been shown to possess fatty acid amide hydrolase (FAAH) and express CB_{1} and utilize 2-AG. Intriguingly, CB_{1} activation by endogenous or exogenous cannabinoids promote NP proliferation and differentiation; this activation is absent in CB_{1} knockouts and abolished in the presence of antagonist.

==== Induction of synaptic depression ====
Endocannabinoids are known to influence synaptic plasticity, and are in particular thought to mediate long-term depression (LTD), which refers to neuronal firing, not psychological depression. Short-term depression (STD) has also been described (see the next paragraph). First reported in the striatum, this system is known to function in several other brain structures such as the nucleus accumbens, amygdala, hippocampus, cerebral cortex, cerebellum, ventral tegmental area (VTA), brain stem, and superior colliculus. Typically, these retrograde transmitters are released by the postsynaptic neuron and induce synaptic depression by activating the presynaptic CB1 receptors.

It has further been suggested that different endocannabinoids, i.e., 2-AG and anandamide, might mediate different forms of synaptic depression through different mechanisms. The study conducted with the bed nucleus of the stria terminalis found that the endurance of the depressant effects was mediated by two different signaling pathways based on the type of receptor activated. 2-AG was found to act on presynaptic CB_{1} receptors to mediate retrograde STD following activation of L-type calcium channels, while anandamide was synthesized after mGluR5 activation and triggered autocrine signalling onto postsynaptic TRPV1 receptors that induced LTD. These findings provide the brain a direct mechanism to selectively inhibit neuronal excitability over variable time scales. By selectively internalizing different receptors, the brain may limit the production of specific endocannabinoids to favor a time scale in accordance with its needs.

=== Appetite ===
Evidence for the role of the endocannabinoid system in food-seeking behavior comes from a variety of cannabinoid studies. Emerging data suggests that THC acts via CB_{1} receptors in the hypothalamic nuclei to directly increase appetite. It is thought that hypothalamic neurons tonically produce endocannabinoids that work to tightly regulate hunger. The amount of endocannabinoids produced is inversely correlated with the amount of leptin in the blood. For example, mice without leptin not only become massively obese but express abnormally high levels of hypothalamic endocannabinoids as a compensatory mechanism. Similarly, when these mice were treated with an endocannabinoid inverse agonists, such as rimonabant, food intake was reduced. When the CB_{1} receptor is knocked out in mice, these animals tend to be leaner and less hungry than wild-type mice. A related study examined the effect of THC on the hedonic (pleasure) value of food and found enhanced dopamine release in the nucleus accumbens and increased pleasure-related behavior after administration of a sucrose solution. A related study found that endocannabinoids affect taste perception in taste cells. In taste cells, endocannabinoids were shown to selectively enhance the strength of neural signaling for sweet tastes, whereas leptin decreased the strength of this same response. While there is need for more research, these results suggest that cannabinoid activity in the hypothalamus and nucleus accumbens is related to appetitive, food-seeking behavior.

=== Energy balance and metabolism ===
The endocannabinoid system has been shown to have a homeostatic role by controlling several metabolic functions, such as energy storage and nutrient transport. It acts on peripheral tissues such as adipocytes, hepatocytes, the gastrointestinal tract, the skeletal muscles and the endocrine pancreas. It has also been implied in modulating insulin sensitivity. Through all of this, the endocannabinoid system may play a role in clinical conditions, such as obesity, diabetes, and atherosclerosis, which may also give it a cardiovascular role.

=== Stress response ===
While the secretion of glucocorticoids in response to stressful stimuli is an adaptive response necessary for an organism to respond appropriately to a stressor, persistent secretion may be harmful. The endocannabinoid system has been implicated in the habituation of the hypothalamic-pituitary-adrenal axis (HPA axis) to repeated exposure to restraint stress. Studies have demonstrated differential synthesis of anandamide and 2-AG during tonic stress. A decrease of anandamide was found along the axis that contributed to basal hypersecretion of corticosterone; in contrast, an increase of 2-AG was found in the amygdala after repeated stress, which was negatively correlated to magnitude of the corticosterone response. All effects were abolished by the CB_{1} antagonist AM251, supporting the conclusion that these effects were cannabinoid-receptor dependent. These findings show that anandamide and 2-AG divergently regulate the HPA axis response to stress: while habituation of the stress-induced HPA axis via 2-AG prevents excessive secretion of glucocorticoids to non-threatening stimuli, the increase of basal corticosterone secretion resulting from decreased anandamide allows for a facilitated response of the HPA axis to novel stimuli.

==== Exploration, social behavior, and anxiety ====
These contrasting effects reveal the importance of the endocannabinoid system in regulating anxiety-dependent behavior. Results suggest that glutamatergic cannabinoid receptors are not only responsible for mediating aggression, but produce an anxiolytic-like function by inhibiting excessive arousal: excessive excitation produces anxiety that limited the mice from exploring both animate and inanimate objects. In contrast, GABAergic neurons appear to control an anxiogenic-like function by limiting inhibitory transmitter release. Taken together, these two sets of neurons appear to help regulate the organism's overall sense of arousal during novel situations.

=== Immune system ===
In laboratory experiments, activation of cannabinoid receptors had an effect on the activation of GTPases in macrophages, neutrophils, and bone marrow cells. These receptors have also been implicated in the migration of B cells into the marginal zone and the regulation of IgM levels.

=== Female reproduction ===
The developing embryo expresses cannabinoid receptors early in development that are responsive to anandamide secreted in the uterus. This signaling is important in regulating the timing of embryonic implantation and uterine receptivity. In mice, it has been shown that anandamide modulates the probability of implantation to the uterine wall. For example, in humans, the likelihood of miscarriage increases if uterine anandamide levels are too high or low. These results suggest that intake of exogenous cannabinoids (e.g., cannabis) can decrease the likelihood for pregnancy for women with high anandamide levels, and alternatively, it can increase the likelihood for pregnancy in women whose anandamide levels were too low.

=== Autonomic nervous system ===
Peripheral expression of cannabinoid receptors led researchers to investigate the role of cannabinoids in the autonomic nervous system. Research found that the CB_{1} receptor is expressed presynaptically by motor neurons that innervate visceral organs. Cannabinoid-mediated inhibition of electric potentials results in a reduction in noradrenaline release from sympathetic nervous system nerves. Other studies have found similar effects in endocannabinoid regulation of intestinal motility, including the innervation of smooth muscles associated with the digestive, urinary, and reproductive systems.

=== Analgesia ===
At the spinal cord, cannabinoids suppress noxious-stimulus-evoked responses of neurons in the dorsal horn, possibly by modulating descending noradrenaline input from the brainstem. As many of these fibers are primarily GABAergic, cannabinoid stimulation in the spinal column results in disinhibition that should increase noradrenaline release and attenuation of noxious-stimuli-processing in the periphery and dorsal root ganglion.

The endocannabinoid most researched in pain is palmitoylethanolamide. Palmitoylethanolamide is a fatty amine related to anandamide, but saturated and although initially it was thought that palmitoylethanolamide would bind to the CB1 and the CB2 receptor, later it was found that the most important receptors are the PPAR-alpha receptor, the TRPV receptor and the GPR55 receptor. Palmitoylethanolamide has been evaluated for its analgesic actions in a great variety of pain indications and found to be safe and effective.

Modulation of the endocannabinoid system by metabolism to N-arachidinoyl-phenolamine (AM404), an endogenous cannabinoid neurotransmitter, has been discovered to be one mechanism for analgesia by acetaminophen (paracetamol).

Endocannabinoids are involved in placebo induced analgesia responses.

=== Thermoregulation ===
Anandamide and N-arachidonoyl dopamine (NADA) have been shown to act on temperature-sensing TRPV1 channels, which are involved in thermoregulation. TRPV1 is activated by the exogenous ligand capsaicin, the active component of chili peppers, which is structurally similar to endocannabinoids. NADA activates the TRPV1 channel with an EC_{50} of approximately of 50 nM. The high potency makes it the putative endogenous TRPV1 agonist. Anandamide has also been found to activate TRPV1 on sensory neuron terminals, and subsequently cause vasodilation. TRPV1 may also be activated by methanandamide and arachidonyl-2'-chloroethylamide (ACEA).

=== Sleep ===
Increased endocannabinoid signaling within the central nervous system promotes sleep-inducing effects. Intercerebroventricular administration of anandamide in rats has been shown to decrease wakefulness and increase slow-wave sleep and REM sleep. Administration of anandamide into the basal forebrain of rats has also been shown to increase levels of adenosine, which plays a role in promoting sleep and suppressing arousal. REM sleep deprivation in rats has been demonstrated to increase CB1 receptor expression in the central nervous system. Furthermore, anandamide levels possess a circadian rhythm in the rat, with levels being higher in the light phase of the day, which is when rats are usually asleep or less active, since they are nocturnal.

=== Physical exercise ===
The endocannabinoid system is also involved in mediating some of the physiological and cognitive effects of voluntary physical exercise in humans and other animals, such as contributing to exercise-induced euphoria as well as modulating locomotor activity and motivational salience for rewards. In humans, the plasma concentration of certain endocannabinoids (i.e., anandamide) have been found to rise during physical activity; since endocannabinoids can effectively penetrate the blood–brain barrier, it has been suggested that anandamide, along with other euphoriant neurochemicals, contributes to the development of exercise-induced euphoria in humans, a state colloquially referred to as a runner's high.

== Cannabinoids in plants ==
The endocannabinoid system is by molecular phylogenetic distribution of apparently ancient lipids in the plant kingdom, indicative of biosynthetic plasticity and potential physiological roles of endocannabinoid-like lipids in plants, and detection of arachidonic acid (AA) indicates chemotaxonomic connections between monophyletic groups with common ancestor dates to around 500 million years ago (Cambrian). The phylogenetic distribution of these lipids may be a consequence of interactions/adaptations to the surrounding conditions such as chemical plant-pollinator interactions, communication and defense mechanisms. The two novel EC-like molecules derived from the eicosatetraenoic acid juniperonic acid, an omega-3 structural isomer of AA, namely juniperoyl ethanolamide and 2-juniperoyl glycerol (1/2-AG) in gymnosperms, lycophytes and few monilophytes, show AA is an evolutionarily conserved signalling molecule that acts in plants in response to stress similar to that in animal systems. The endocannabinoid Docosatetraenoylethanolamide has been found in Tropaeolum tuberosum (mashua) and Leonotis leonurus (lion's tail). Maca contains several N-benzylamides referred to as "macamides" that are structurally related to endocannabinoids such as the N-Benzyl analog of oleamide. Echinacea contains alkylamides structurally related to endocannabinoids.

== Cannabinoids in Cyanobacterium ==
Serinolamide A is a cannabinoid structurally related to endocannabinoids found in cyanobacteria such as Lyngbya majuscula and other species in the Oscillatoria family.

== Endocannabinoid articles ==
- Anandamide
- 2-Arachidonoylglycerol
- 2-Arachidonyl glyceryl ether
- Oleamide
- Oleoylethanolamide
- Virodhamine
- Docosatetraenoylethanolamide
- Stearoylethanolamide
- N-Arachidonylglycine
- Arachidonoyl serotonin
- N-Arachidonoyl dopamine
- N-Acylethanolamine

== See also ==
- Endocannabinoid enhancer
- Endocannabinoid reuptake inhibitor
- Cannabinol
- Cannabinoid receptor antagonist
- Jasmonate
- Peroxisome proliferator-activated receptor
- TRPV
