= N-acetylphosphatidylethanolamine-hydrolysing phospholipase D =

Enzyme involved in biosynthesis of anandamide

Identifiers
- EC no.: 3.1.4.54

Databases
- IntEnz: IntEnz view
- BRENDA: BRENDA entry
- ExPASy: NiceZyme view
- KEGG: KEGG entry
- MetaCyc: metabolic pathway
- PRIAM: profile
- PDB structures: RCSB PDB PDBe PDBsum
Search
- PMC: articles
- PubMed: articles
- NCBI: proteins

N-acetylphosphatidylethanolamine-hydrolysing phospholipase D (EC 3.1.4.54, NAPE-PLD, anandamide-generating phospholipase D, N-acyl phosphatidylethanolamine phospholipase D, NAPE-hydrolyzing phospholipase D) is an enzyme with systematic name N-acetylphosphatidylethanolamine phosphatidohydrolase. It catalyses the following chemical reaction

N-acylphosphatidylethanolamine + H_{2}O $\rightleftharpoons$ N-acylethanolamine + a 1,2-diacylglycerol 3-phosphate

This enzyme is involved in the biosynthesis of anandamide.

== See also ==
- Endocannabinoid System
- N-acyl phosphatidylethanolamine
