= Linoleic acid =

18-Carbon polyunsaturated fatty acid

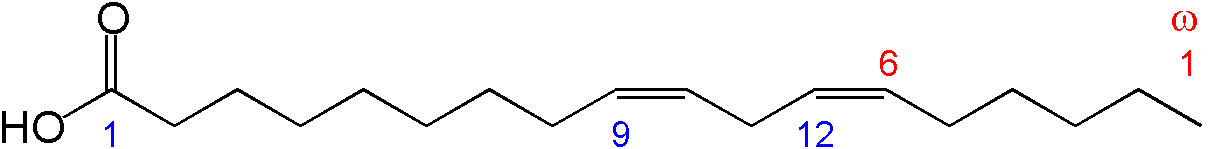

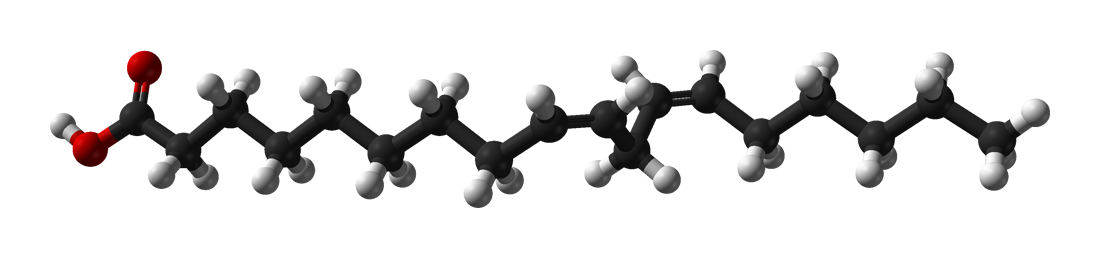

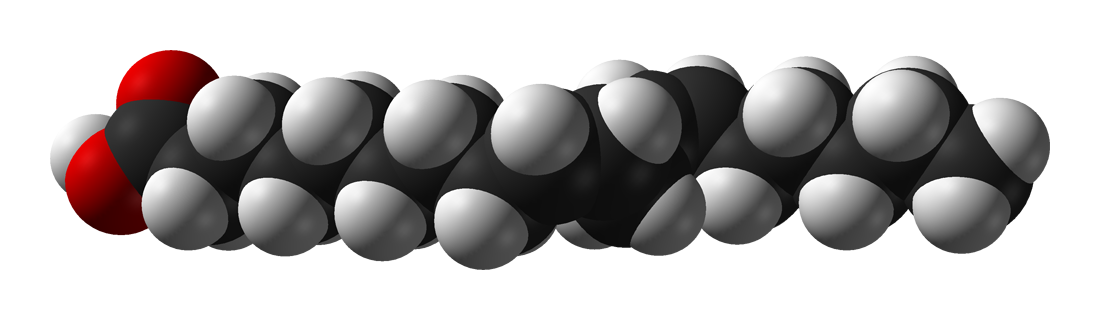

Names
- Preferred IUPAC name (9Z,12Z)-Octadeca-9,12-dienoic acid
- Other names cis,cis-9,12-Octadecadienoic acid C18:2 (Lipid numbers)

Identifiers
CAS Number	60-33-3
3D model (JSmol)	Interactive image
Beilstein Reference	1727101
ChEBI	CHEBI:17351
ChEMBL	ChEMBL267476
ChemSpider	4444105
DrugBank	DB14104
ECHA InfoCard	100.000.428
EC Number	200-470-9
Gmelin Reference	57557
IUPHAR/BPS	1052
KEGG	C01595
PubChem CID	5280450
UNII	9KJL21T0QJ
CompTox Dashboard (EPA)	DTXSID2025505
- InChI: InChI=1S/C18H32O2/c1-2-3-4-5-6-7-8-9-10-11-12-13-14-15-16-17-18(19)20/h6-7,9-10H,2-5,8,11-17H2,1H3,(H,19,20)/b7-6-,10-9- Key: OYHQOLUKZRVURQ-HZJYTTRNSA-N; InChI=1/C18H32O2/c1-2-3-4-5-6-7-8-9-10-11-12-13-14-15-16-17-18(19)20/h6-7,9-10H,2-5,8,11-17H2,1H3,(H,19,20)/b7-6-,10-9- Key: OYHQOLUKZRVURQ-HZJYTTRNBX
- SMILES: CCCCC/C=C\C/C=C\CCCCCCCC(=O)O

Properties
Chemical formula	C_{18}H_{32}O_{2}
Molar mass	280.452 g·mol^{−1}
Appearance	Colorless oil
Density	0.9 g/cm^{3}
Melting point	−12 °C (10 °F) −6.9 °C (19.6 °F) −5 °C (23 °F)
Boiling point	229 °C (444 °F) at 16 mmHg; 230 °C (446 °F) at 21 mbar 230 °C (446 °F) at 16 mmHg
Solubility in water	0.139 mg/L
Vapor pressure	16 Torr at 229 °C
Acidity (pK_{a})	4.77 at 25°C

Hazards
NFPA 704 (fire diamond)	2 1 0
Flash point	112 °C (234 °F)
- Except where otherwise noted, data are given for materials in their standard state (at 25 °C [77 °F], 100 kPa). verify (what is ?) Infobox references

Linoleic acid (LA) is an organic compound with the formula CH_{3}(CH_{2})_{4}CH=CHCH_{2}CH=CH(CH_{2})_{7}COOH. Both alkene groups (−CH=CH−) are cis. It is a fatty acid sometimes denoted 18:2 (n−6) or 18:2 cis-9,12. A linoleate is a salt or ester of this acid.

Linoleic acid is a polyunsaturated, omega−6 fatty acid. It is a colorless liquid that is virtually insoluble in water but soluble in many organic solvents. It typically occurs in nature as a triglyceride (ester of glycerin) rather than as a free fatty acid. It is one of two essential fatty acids for humans, who must obtain it through their diet, and the most essential, because the body uses it as a base to make the others. Linoleic acid intake is associated with lowering the risk of cardiovascular disease.

The word "linoleic" derives from Latin linum 'flax' and oleum 'oil', reflecting the fact that it was first isolated from linseed oil.

== History ==
In 1844, F. Sacc, working at the laboratory of Justus von Liebig, isolated linoleic acid from linseed oil. In 1886, K. Peters determined the existence of two double bonds. Its essential role in human diet was discovered by G. O. Burr and others in 1930. Its chemical structure was determined by T. P. Hilditch and others in 1939, and it was synthesized by R. A. Raphael and F. Sondheimer in 1950.

== In physiology ==
The consumption of linoleic acid is vital to proper health, as it is an essential fatty acid.

=== Metabolism and eicosanoids ===
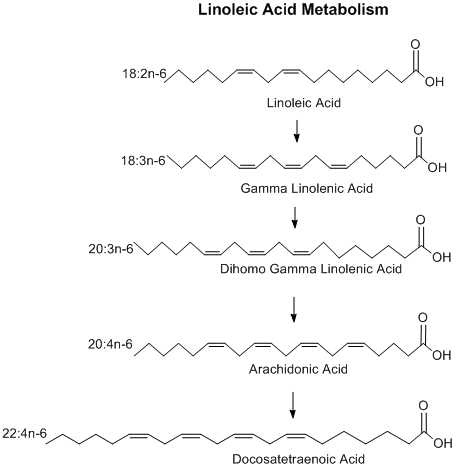

Linoleic acid (LA: C_{18}H_{32}O_{2}; 18:2,n−6) is a precursor to arachidonic acid (AA: C_{20}H_{32}O_{2}; 20:4,n−6) with elongation and unsaturation. AA is the precursor to some prostaglandins, leukotrienes (LTA, LTB, LTC), thromboxane (TXA) and the N-acylethanolamine (NAE) arachidonoylethanolamine (AEA: C_{22}H_{37}NO_{2}; 20:4,n−6), and other endocannabinoids and eicosanoids.

The metabolism of LA to AA begins with the conversion of LA into gamma-linolenic acid (GLA), effected by Δ6 desaturase. GLA is converted to dihomo-γ-linolenic acid (DGLA), the immediate precursor to AA.

LA is also converted by various lipoxygenases, cyclooxygenases, cytochrome P450 enzymes (the CYP monooxygenases), and non-enzymatic autoxidation mechanisms to mono-hydroxyl products viz., 13-Hydroxyoctadecadienoic acid, and 9-Hydroxyoctadecadienoic acid; these two hydroxy metabolites are enzymatically oxidized to their keto metabolites, 13-oxo-octadecadienoic acid and 9-oxo-octadecdienoic acid. Certain cytochrome P450 enzymes, the CYP epoxygenases, catalyze oxidation of LA to epoxide products viz., its 12,13-epoxide, vernolic acid, and its 9,10-epoxide, coronaric acid. These linoleic acid products are implicated in human physiology and pathology.

Hydroperoxides derived from the metabolism of anandamide (AEA: C_{22}H_{37}NO_{2}; 20:4,n−6), or its linoleoyl analogues, are by a lipoxygenase action found to be competitive inhibitors of brain and immune cell FAAH, the enzyme that breaks down AEA and other endocannabinoids, and the compound linoleoyl-ethanol-amide (C_{20}H_{37}NO_{2}; 18:2,n−6), an N-acylethanolamine, - the ethanolamide of linoleic acid (LA: C_{18}H_{32}O_{2}; 18:2,n−6) and its metabolized incorporated ethanolamine (MEA: C_{2}H_{7}NO), is the first natural inhibitor of FAAH, discovered.

== Uses and reactions ==
Linoleic acid is a component of quick-drying oils, which are useful in oil paints and varnishes. These applications exploit the lability of the doubly allylic C−H groups (−CH=CH−CH_{2}−CH=CH−) toward oxygen in air (autoxidation). Addition of oxygen leads to crosslinking and formation of a stable film.

Reduction of the carboxylic acid group of linoleic acid yields linoleyl alcohol.

Linoleic acid is a surfactant with a critical micelle concentration of 1.5×10^{−4} M at pH 7.5.

Linoleic acid has become increasingly popular in the beauty products industry because of its beneficial properties on the skin. Research points to linoleic acid's anti-inflammatory, acne reductive, skin-lightening and moisture retentive properties when applied topically on the skin.

Linoleic acid is also used in some bar of soap products.

== Dietary sources ==
It is abundant in safflower, and corn oil, and comprises over half their composition by weight. It is present in medium quantities in soybean oils, sesame, and almonds.

Name	% LA^{†}	ref.
Salicornia oil	75%	
Poppyseed oil	74%	
Safflower oil	72–78%	
Grape seed oil	70%	
Evening Primrose oil	65–80%	
Cardoon oil	60%	
Wheat germ oil	56%	
Hemp oil	54.3%	
Cottonseed oil	54%	
Corn oil	51.9%	
Prickly Pear seed oil	50–78%	
Walnut oil	50–72%	
Melon seed oil	50–70%	
Soybean oil	50.9%	
Sesame oil	45%	
Pumpkin seed oil	42–59%	
Rice bran oil	39%	
Argan oil	37%	
Pistachio oil	32.7%	
Peach oil	29%	
Almonds	24%	
Sunflower oil	20.5%	
Peanut oil	19.6%	
Chicken fat	18–23%	
Canola oil	17.8%	
Egg yolk	16%	
Linseed oil (flax), cold pressed	14.2%	
Lard	10%	
Palm oil	10%	
Olive oil	8.4%	
Tallow	3%	
Cocoa butter	3%	
Macadamia oil	2%	
Butter	2%	
Coconut oil	2%	
	^{†}average value, except the items where a range is given	

=== Other occurrences ===
Cockroaches release oleic and linoleic acid upon death, which discourages other roaches from entering the area. This is similar to the mechanism found in ants and bees, which release oleic acid upon death.

== Related compounds ==
While polyunsaturated fatty acids are unusual in plant cuticles, a diunsaturated dicarboxylic acid has been reported as a component of the surface waxes or polyesters of some plant species. Thus, octadeca-c6,c9-diene-1,18-dioate, a derivative of linoleic acid, is present in Arabidopsis and Brassica napus cuticle. Taxoleic acid is isomeric to linoleic acid.

== Health effects ==
Consumption of linoleic acid is associated with lowering the risk of cardiovascular disease, type-2 diabetes, peripheral artery disease and premature death. There is high-quality evidence that increased intake of linoleic acid decreases total blood cholesterol and low-density lipoprotein. Higher in vivo circulating and tissue levels of linoleic acid are associated with a lower risk of major cardiovascular events. Clinical trials have found that increased linoleic acid intake does not increase markers of inflammation or oxidative stress. Linoleic acid intake is associated with a lower risk of breast and prostate cancer.

The American Heart Association advises people to replace saturated fat with linoleic acid to reduce CVD risk.

== See also ==
- Conjugated linoleic acid
- Essential fatty acid interactions
- Essential nutrients
- Fulgidic acid
- Laballenic acid
- Linolein
