= ETNK1 =

Protein-coding gene in humans

Identifiers
- Aliases: ETNK1, EKI, EKI 1, EKI1, Nbla10396, ethanolamine kinase 1
- External IDs: OMIM: 609858; MGI: 1922570; GeneCards: ETNK1
Enzyme activity
EC #	BRENDA	ExPASy	KEGG	MetaCyc
2.7.1.82	↗	↗	↗	↗

Gene location (Human)
Chr.	Chromosome 12 (human)
Band	12p12.1	Start	22,625,075 bp
Band	12p12.1	End	22,690,665 bp

Gene location (Mouse)
Chr.	Chromosome 6 (mouse)
Band	6 G3|6 75.41 cM	Start	143,112,947 bp
Band	6 G3|6 75.41 cM	End	143,178,033 bp
RNA expression pattern
Bgee	Human / Mouse (ortholog); Top expressed in: jejunal mucosa; mucosa of transverse colon; bronchial epithelial cell; retinal pigment epithelium; mucosa of ileum; mucosa of paranasal sinus; germinal epithelium; mucosa of sigmoid colon; tibia; caput epididymis / Top expressed in: ventral tegmental area; dorsomedial hypothalamic nucleus; habenula; dorsal tegmental nucleus; lateral hypothalamus; lacrimal gland; median eminence; ventromedial nucleus; medial vestibular nucleus; arcuate nucleus; More reference expression data
BioGPS	n/a
Gene ontology
Molecular function	kinase activity; transferase activity; nucleotide binding; protein binding; ATP binding; ethanolamine kinase activity
Cellular component	plasma membrane; membrane; nucleoplasm; cytoplasm; cytosol
Biological process	phosphatidylethanolamine biosynthetic process; phosphorylation; lipid metabolism; phospholipid biosynthetic process
Sources:Amigo / QuickGO
Orthologs
Databases	NCBI: entry; OMA: entry
Species	Human	Mouse
Entrez	55500	75320
Ensembl	ENSG00000139163	ENSMUSG00000030275
UniProt	Q9HBU6	Q9D4V0
RefSeq (mRNA)	NM_001039481; NM_018638	NM_029250
RefSeq (protein)	NP_001034570; NP_061108	NP_083526
Location (UCSC)	Chr 12: 22.63 – 22.69 Mb	Chr 6: 143.11 – 143.18 Mb
PubMed search
- Wikidata
View/Edit Human	View/Edit Mouse

Ethanolamine kinase 1 is a protein that in humans is encoded by the ETNK1 gene. Ethanolamine kinase 1 is a cytosolic enzyme that catalyzes the first committed step in phosphatidylethanolamine synthesis. It is associated with Heyn-Sproul-Jackson syndrome.
