= N-acyl phosphatidylethanolamine-specific phospholipase D =

Type of enzyme

NAPEPLD
Available structures
PDB	Ortholog search: PDBe RCSB
PDB	List of PDB id codes 4QN9

Identifiers
- Aliases: NAPEPLD, FMP30, NAPE-PLD, N-acyl phosphatidylethanolamine phospholipase D, C7orf18
- External IDs: OMIM: 612334; MGI: 2140885; HomoloGene: 7094; GeneCards: NAPEPLD; OMA:NAPEPLD - orthologs

Gene location (Human)
Chr.	Chromosome 7 (human)
Band	7q22.1	Start	103,099,776 bp
Band	7q22.1	End	103,149,560 bp

Gene location (Mouse)
Chr.	Chromosome 5 (mouse)
Band	5|5 A3	Start	21,867,899 bp
Band	5|5 A3	End	21,906,394 bp
RNA expression pattern
Bgee	Human / Mouse (ortholog); Top expressed in: corpus callosum; ventricular zone; superior frontal gyrus; duodenum; primary visual cortex; Brodmann area 9; prefrontal cortex; rectum; cerebellar cortex; cerebellar hemisphere / Top expressed in: ascending aorta; dentate gyrus of hippocampal formation granule cell; ventricular zone; spermatocyte; adrenal gland; lumbar subsegment of spinal cord; lens; muscle of thigh; spermatid; epithelium of lens; More reference expression data
BioGPS	n/a
Gene ontology
Molecular function	zinc ion binding; phospholipase activity; hydrolase activity; metal ion binding; N-acylphosphatidylethanolamine-specific phospholipase D activity; N-acetylphosphatidylethanolamine-hydrolysing phospholipase activity; identical protein binding
Cellular component	photoreceptor outer segment membrane; extracellular exosome; membrane; membrane-bounded organelle; cytosol; Golgi membrane; nucleus; nuclear envelope; nucleoplasm; endosome; early endosome; Golgi apparatus; early endosome membrane
Biological process	lipid catabolic process; retinoid metabolic process; lipid metabolism; phospholipid catabolic process; ageing; negative regulation of eating behavior; phospholipid metabolic process; response to isolation stress; N-acylethanolamine metabolic process; temperature homeostasis; host-mediated regulation of intestinal microbiota composition; positive regulation of inflammatory response; N-acylphosphatidylethanolamine metabolic process; positive regulation of brown fat cell differentiation
Sources:Amigo / QuickGO
Orthologs
Species	Human	Mouse
Entrez	222236	242864
Ensembl	ENSG00000161048; ENSG00000275723	ENSMUSG00000044968
UniProt	Q6IQ20	Q8BH82
RefSeq (mRNA)	NM_001122838; NM_198990	NM_178728; NM_001359963; NM_001359964; NM_001359965
RefSeq (protein)	NP_001116310; NP_945341	NP_848843; NP_001346892; NP_001346893; NP_001346894
Location (UCSC)	Chr 7: 103.1 – 103.15 Mb	Chr 5: 21.87 – 21.91 Mb
PubMed search
- Wikidata
View/Edit Human	View/Edit Mouse

N-acyl phosphatidylethanolamine phospholipase D

Identifiers
- Symbol: NAPEPLD
- NCBI gene: 222236
- HGNC: 21683
- OMIM: 612334
- PDB: 4QN9
- RefSeq: NM_001122838
- UniProt: Q6IQ20

Other data
- EC number: 3.1.4.54
- Locus: Chr. 7 q22.1
Search for
- Structures: Swiss-model
- Domains: InterPro

N-acyl phosphatidylethanolamine phospholipase D (NAPE-PLD) is an enzyme that catalyzes the release of N-acylethanolamine (NAE) from N-acyl-phosphatidylethanolamine (NAPE). This is a major part of the process that converts ordinary lipids into chemical signals like anandamide and oleoylethanolamine. In humans, the NAPE-PLD protein is encoded by the NAPEPLD gene.

== Discovery ==
NAPE-PLD is an enzyme activity - a phospholipase, acting on phospholipids found in the cell membrane. It is not homology but the chemical outcome of its activity that classes it as phospholipase D. The enzymatic activity was discovered and characterized in a series of experiments culminating in the 2004 publication of a biochemical purification scheme from which peptide sequencing could be accomplished. Researchers homogenized (finely ground) hearts from 150 rats and subjected the resulting crude lysate to sucrose sedimentation at 105,000 x g to separate the cell membranes from the remainder of the cell. The integral membrane proteins were then solubilized using octyl glucoside and subjected to four column chromatography steps (HiTrap SP HP cation-exchange column, HiTrap Q anion-exchange column, HiTrap Blue affinity column, Bio-Gel HTP hydroxyapatite column). Each of these separates the different types of membrane proteins into different sample containers when the proteins are eluted from the column over time, and by measuring the activity of samples in each container it was possible to track which ones received the active enzyme. Measurement of the enzyme activity was done by thin layer chromatography of a radioactive substrate sensitive to the NAPE-PLD enzymatic activity: Cleavage of the substrate affected where it appeared on the plate when the radiation was detected on a bioimaging analyzer.

The result of this extensive procedure was still not a pure protein, but it produced a limited number of bands by SDS-PAGE, and one band of 46 kilodaltons was found to correlate in intensity with the enzymatic activity. This band was cut from the gel and digested with trypsin, and peptides from it were separated from one another by reverse phase high performance liquid chromatography. The resulting fragments were then microsequenced by an automated Edman degradation. Three corresponded to vimentin, an intermediate filament protein of 56 kDa believed to be a contaminant, and the other two matched the cDNA clone subsequently identified as NAPE-PLD.

Once this clue had been obtained, the identification could be confirmed by a less onerous procedure: Overexpression of the putative NAPE-PLD cDNA in COS-7 cells yielded a strong NAPE-PLD enzymatic activity, whose characteristics were shown to be similar to those of the original heart extract.

== Characteristics ==
The NAPEPLD cDNA sequence predicts 396 amino acid sequences in both mice and rats, which are 89% and 90% identical to that of humans. NAPE-PLD was found to have no homology to the known phospholipase D genes, but can be classed by homology to fall into the zinc metallohydrolase family of the beta-lactamase fold. In particular, the highly conserved motif HX(E/H)XD(C/R/S/H)X_{50–70}HX_{15–30}(C/S/D)X_{30–70}H was observed, which is, in general, associated with zinc binding and hydrolysis reaction in this class of proteins, leading the authors to propose that activity should be correlated with zinc content.

When recombinant NAPE-PLD was tested in COS cells in vitro it had similar activity toward several radiolabeled substrates: N-palmitoylphosphatidylethanolamine, N-arachidonoylphosphatidylethanolamine, N-oleoylphosphatidylethanolamine, and N-stearoylphosphatidylethanolamine all reacted with a K_{m} between 2–4 micromolar and a V_{max} between 73 and 101 nanomole per milligram per minute as calculated by Lineweaver–Burk plot. (These generate N-palmitoylethanolamine, anandamide, N-oleoylethanolamine, and N-stearoylethanolamine, respectively) The enzyme also reacted N-palmitoyl-lyso-phosphatidylethanolamine and N-arachidonoyl-lyso-phosphatidylethanolamine with similar K_{m} but at one-third to one-fourth the V_{max}. These activities are consistent with the observation that many tissues produce a range of N-acylethanolamines.

However, NAPE-PLD had no ability to produce detectable phosphatidic acid from phosphatidylcholine or phosphatidylethanolamine as is catalyzed by other phospholipase D enzymes. It also lacks the transphosphatidylation activity of phospholipase D that allows the creation of phosphatidyl alcohols rather than phosphatidic acid in the presence of ethanol or butanol.

== Pathway ==
This enzyme acts as the second step of a biochemical pathway initiated by the creation of N-acylphosphatidylethanolamine, by means of the transfer of an acyl group from the sn-1 position of glycerophospholipid onto the amino group of phosphatidylethanolamine. While NAPE-PLD contributes to the biosynthesis of several NAEs in the mammalian central nervous system, it is not clear if this enzyme is not responsible for the formation of the endocannabinoid anandamide, since NAPE-PLD knockout mice have been reported to have wild-type levels or very reduced levels of anandamide.

The N-acylethanolamines released by this enzyme become potential substrates for fatty acid amide hydrolase (FAAH), which hydrolyzes the free fatty acids from ethanolamine. Defects in this enzyme can cause NAPE-PLD products such as anandamide to build up to levels 15-fold higher than normally observed.

== Structure ==
This membrane enzyme forms homodimers, partly separated by an internal ~9-Å-wide channel. The metallo beta-lactamase protein fold is adapted to associate with membrane phospholipids. A hydrophobic cavity provides an entry way for the substrate NAPE into the active site, where a binuclear zinc center catalyzes its hydrolysis. Bile acids bind with high affinity to selective pockets in this cavity, enhancing dimer assembly and enabling catalysis. NAPE-PLD facilitates crosstalk between bile acid signals and lipid amide signals.

== Pharmacology ==
Thiazide and thiazide-like diuretics are among the most efficacious and used drugs for the treatment of hypertension, edema, and major cardiovascular outcomes. Despite more than six decades of clinical use, the mechanism of action by which these drugs cure hypertension after long-term use had remained mysterious. Recently, Garau Gianpiero and co-authors reported that the membrane enzyme NAPE-PLD is a renal and extrarenal target of hydrochlorothiazide, chlortalidone and indapamide, shedding light on their mechanism of action in the treatment of hypertension and cardiovascular diseases. As revealed by the crystal structures of NAPE-PLD in complex with hydrochlorothiazide and pyridoxal phosphate (PLP), thiazide molecules bind within the 9 Angostrom-wide internal channel of NAPE-PLD in a manner competitive with the cofactor PLP. In the presence of bile acids, the association of NAPE-PLD with membranes creates membrane pores as dynamic conductive pathways through which the charged PLP can diffuse through cell membranes and membranes of subcellular compartments (e.g., mitochondria and peroxisome). The fact that thiazide medications promote beneficial effects that involve directly a main protein of the endocannabinoid system, NAPE-PLD, reveals not only a novel target for cardiovascular disease, but a way to modulate efficaciously the endocannabinoid system in therapy. These results can be useful in the management of vascular risk factors,as well as associated leukoencephalopathy and demyelinating disease.
