= Cannabis in pregnancy =

Effects of cannabis consumption during pregnancy

Cannabis consumption in pregnancy is an important public health issue. Research has found possible or likely associations between cannabis use and a risk of adverse outcomes in respect of cognitive development, mental health, physical health, and lactation.

Cannabis is the most commonly used controlled substance among pregnant women. It increases risk of fertility problems in both men and women, fetal development problems, and negative birth outcomes. The American College of Obstetricians and Gynecologists recommends that women avoid use of cannabis while trying to get pregnant, during pregnancy, and while breastfeeding.

== Endocannabinoid system ==
The endocannabinoid system (ECS) has wide-ranging effects on the central and peripheral nervous systems and is deeply involved in the control of reproduction in both sexes. Endocannabinoid CB1 and CB2 receptors are primarily found in the brain and immune system, but are also present in the anterior pituitary gland and the oviduct and uterus of the female reproductive tract as well as other parts of the body. The activity of CB1 and CB2 receptors are related to problems in fertilization and implantation.

The activation of cannabinoid receptors in sperm cells can impair sperm function, production and quality. Balanced endocannabinoid signaling is essential for normal spermatogenisis, while disruption of the ECS can decrease gamete quality and change the epigenesis of germ cells. Cannabis use is linked to fertility problems in both males and females.

Most studies through 2013 linking development of the fetus and cannabis show effects of consumption during the gestational period, but abnormalities in the endocannabinoid system during the phase of placental development are also linked with problems in pregnancy. According to Sun and Dey (2012), endocannabinoid signaling plays a role in "female reproductive events, including preimplantation embryo development, oviductal embryo transport, embryo implantation, placentation, and parturition".

Recent data indicates that endometrial expression of cannabinoid receptors in marijuana smoking mothers is higher than non-smokers. Keimpema and colleagues (2011) said, "Prenatal cannabis exposure can lead to growth defects during formation of the nervous system"; "[c]annabis impacts the formation and functions of neuronal circuitries by targeting cannabinoid receptors". A report prepared for the Australian National Council on Drugs concluded cannabis and other cannabinoids are contraindicated in pregnancy as they may interact with the endocannabinoid system.

== Effects ==
As of 2023 the rising use of cannabis during pregnancy, and the rise in cannabis potency, has become an important public health issue. Research has found associations between cannabis use and the risk of adverse outcomes related to physical health, cognitive development, mental health, and lactation. Cannabis, tobacco, and vaping all contribute to indoor air pollution and the negative effects of pollution on reproduction. In addition, tetrahydrocannabinol (THC), a psychoactive component in cannabis, is absorbed into the bloodstream where spreads rapidly throughout the body. It can cross the placenta and be expressed in breast milk.

With respect to reproduction, cannabis use has been found to negatively affect male and female fertility, reproductive hormones, menstrual cycles, and semen quality. Male cannabis use is also associated with erectile dysfunction and testicular atrophy. Female cannabis use is also associated with abnormal embryo implantation, disrupted fetal development, and adverse birth outcomes including preterm birth, small-for-gestational-age infants, and long-term health effects.

=== Mental and cognitive ===
Cannabis use during pregnancy is associated with adverse effects on the mental health and cognitive performance of offspring. Cannabis use by pregnant mothers is linked to impaired brain maturation in their children. Prenatal exposure to cannabinoids affects the architecture of the brain the and migration and differentiation of neurons.

THC exposure during the prenatal developmental phase has been linked to increased risk for cognitive impairment and psychiatric conditions including psychosis, depression, anxiety, and sleep disorders. The male offspring of THC users are more susceptible to psychotic illness.

=== Epigenetics ===
Epigenetics can be described as biological processes that change gene expression without changing the actual nucleotide DNA sequence. This usually occurs as a result of chemical modifications, which can include activity of the endocannabinoid signalling system. It is possible for such changes to be transmitted to offspring via gametes, resulting in multi-generational epigenetic inheritance. There is evidence to suggest that THC exposure can not only cause changes in reproduction, but also pass these on generationally.

== Medical use in pregnancy ==
The American College of Obstetricians and Gynecologists recommends that women avoid use of cannabis while trying to get pregnant, during pregnancy, and while breastfeeding.

It is a common misconception that cannabis use in pregnancy is low risk; a 2015 study found that 70% of women in the United States assume that using cannabis 1-2 times a week while pregnant is safe. Women widely report a belief that cannabis is safer than prescription drugs because it is natural and report using it in to treat conditions including pain, anxiety, bipolar disorder, and insomnia.

Hyperemesis gravidarum (HG) is a condition characterized by severe nausea and vomiting, malnutrition, and weight loss during pregnancy, and occurs to 1-2% of pregnant women globally. Women experiencing hyperemesis, as well as normal nausea and vomiting during pregnancy, have anecdotally reported varying degrees of symptomatic relief after using cannabis. However, this is currently not considered a safe or standard application of medical marijuana due to potential harms.

== See also ==
- Drugs in pregnancy
- N-acylethanolamine (NAE)
