= Oleoylethanolamide =

Names
- Preferred IUPAC name (9Z)-N-(2-Hydroxyethyl)octadec-9-enamide

Identifiers
CAS Number	111-58-0
3D model (JSmol)	Interactive image
ChEBI	CHEBI:77362
ChemSpider	4446574
ECHA InfoCard	100.003.532
IUPHAR/BPS	2661
PubChem CID	5283454
UNII	1HI5J9N8E6
CompTox Dashboard (EPA)	DTXSID1044516
- InChI: InChI=1S/C20H39NO2/c1-2-3-4-5-6-7-8-9-10-11-12-13-14-15-16-17-20(23)21-18-19-22/h9-10,22H,2-8,11-19H2,1H3,(H,21,23)/b10-9- Key: BOWVQLFMWHZBEF-KTKRTIGZSA-N; InChI=1/C20H39NO2/c1-2-3-4-5-6-7-8-9-10-11-12-13-14-15-16-17-20(23)21-18-19-22/h9-10,22H,2-8,11-19H2,1H3,(H,21,23)/b10-9- Key: BOWVQLFMWHZBEF-KTKRTIGZBW
- SMILES: CCCCCCCC\C=C/CCCCCCCC(=O)NCCO

Properties
Chemical formula	C_{20}H_{39}NO_{2}
Molar mass	325.537 g·mol^{−1}
Appearance	White solid
Melting point	59–60 °C (138–140 °F; 332–333 K)
Solubility in ethanol and DMSO	Soluble
- Except where otherwise noted, data are given for materials in their standard state (at 25 °C [77 °F], 100 kPa). verify (what is ?) Infobox references

Oleoylethanolamide (OEA) is an endogenous peroxisome proliferator-activated receptor alpha (PPAR-α) agonist. It is a naturally occurring ethanolamide lipid that regulates feeding and body weight in vertebrates ranging from mice to pythons.

OEA is a shorter, monounsaturated analogue of the endocannabinoid anandamide, but unlike anandamide it acts independently of the cannabinoid pathway, regulating PPAR-α activity to stimulate lipolysis.

OEA is produced by the small intestine following feeding in two steps. First an N-acyl transferase (NAT) activity joins the free amino terminus of phosphatidylethanolamine (PE) to the oleoyl group (one variety of acyl group) derived from sn-1-oleoyl-phosphatidylcholine, which contains the fatty acid oleic acid at the sn-1 position. This produces an N-acylphosphatidylethanolamine, which is then split (hydrolyzed) by N-acyl phosphatidylethanolamine-specific phospholipase D (NAPE-PLD) into phosphatidic acid and OEA. The biosynthesis of OEA and other bioactive lipid amides is modulated by bile acids.

OEA has been demonstrated to bind to the novel cannabinoid receptor GPR119. OEA has been suggested to be the receptor's endogenous ligand.

OEA has been hypothesized to play a key role in the inhibition of food seeking behavior and in the lipolysis of brown bears "ursus arctos" during the hibernation season together with the alteration of the endocannabinoid system required for the metabolic changes for hibernation.

OEA has been reported to lengthen the life span of the roundworm Caenorhabditis elegans through interactions with lysomal molecules.

OEA is mainly known by its anorexigenic effects. However, it has also neuroprotective properties. In this sense, recent research has demonstrated that OEA reduces neuronal death in a murine model of aggressive neurodegeneration. Such neuroprotective effect is triggered by a stabilization of microtubule dynamics and by the modulation of neuroinflammation
