= Serinolamide A =

Chemical compound

Identifiers
- IUPAC name: (R,E)-N-(1-Hydroxy-3-methoxypropan-2-yl)-N-methyloctadec-4-enamide
- CAS Number: 1342300-14-4
- PubChem CID: 56597771
- ChemSpider: 27025743
- UNII: 7AX37Z58VV
- CompTox Dashboard (EPA): DTXSID701045276

Chemical and physical data
- Formula: C_{23}H_{45}NO_{3}
- Molar mass: 383.617 g·mol^{−1}
- 3D model (JSmol): Interactive image
- SMILES: O=C(N(C)[C@H](CO)COC)CC/C=C/CCCCCCCCCCCCC
- InChI: InChI=1S/C23H45NO3/c1-4-5-6-7-8-9-10-11-12-13-14-15-16-17-18-19-23(26)24(2)22(20-25)21-27-3/h16-17,22,25H,4-15,18-21H2,1-3H3/b17-16+/t22-/m1/s1; Key:CJAVPRNATZCNLN-NBRGKURFSA-N

Serinolamide A is a naturally occurring eicosanoid derivative related to anandamide, which has been isolated from the marine cyanobacteria Lyngbya majuscula and related species in the Oscillatoria family.

Testing established that serinolamide A is an active cannabinoid agonist with moderate potency, having a K_{i} of 1300 nM at CB_{1} and fivefold selectivity over the related CB_{2} receptor.

== See also ==
- Methanandamide
- O-1812
- Perrottetinene
