= Phosphatidylserine decarboxylase =

PISD

Identifiers
- Aliases: PISD, DJ858B16, PSD, PSDC, PSSC, dJ858B16.2, phosphatidylserine decarboxylase, LIBF
- External IDs: OMIM: 612770; MGI: 2445114; GeneCards: PISD
Enzyme activity
EC #	BRENDA	ExPASy	KEGG	MetaCyc
4.1.1.65	↗	↗	↗	↗

Gene location (Human)
Chr.	Chromosome 22 (human)
Band	22q12.2	Start	31,618,491 bp
Band	22q12.2	End	31,662,221 bp

Gene location (Mouse)
Chr.	Chromosome 5 (mouse)
Band	5|5 B1	Start	32,893,645 bp
Band	5|5 B1	End	32,942,990 bp
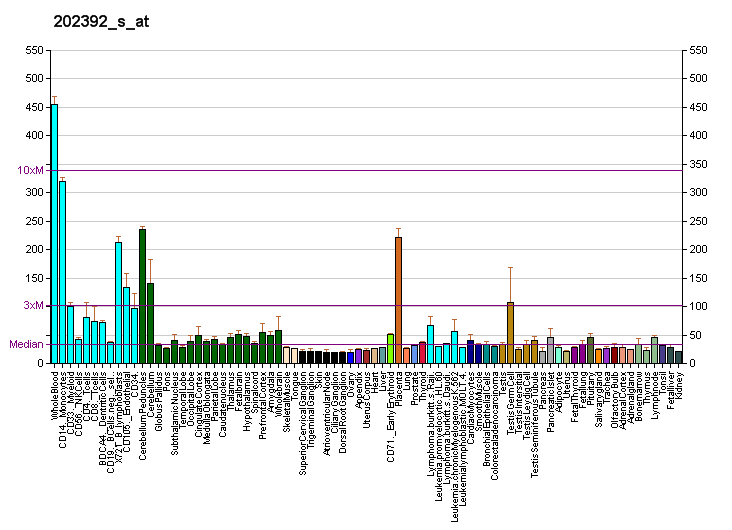
RNA expression pattern
Bgee	Human / Mouse (ortholog); Top expressed in: cerebellar hemisphere; right hemisphere of cerebellum; paraflocculus of cerebellum; cerebellar vermis; granulocyte; blood; monocyte; right frontal lobe; spleen; pituitary gland / Top expressed in: hypothalamus; proximal tubule; granulocyte; colon; right kidney; mesencephalon; duodenum; neural tube; jejunum; spermatocyte; More reference expression data
BioGPS	More reference expression data
Gene ontology
Molecular function	carboxy-lyase activity; lyase activity; phosphatidylserine decarboxylase activity
Cellular component	integral component of membrane; mitochondrial inner membrane; membrane; mitochondrion; nucleus; integral component of mitochondrial inner membrane
Biological process	lipid metabolism; phospholipid biosynthetic process; phosphatidylethanolamine biosynthetic process; protein autoprocessing
Sources:Amigo / QuickGO
Orthologs
Databases	NCBI: entry; OMA: entry
Species	Human	Mouse
Entrez	23761	320951
Ensembl	ENSG00000241878	ENSMUSG00000023452
UniProt	Q9UG56	Q8BSF4
RefSeq (mRNA)	NM_014338; NM_001326411; NM_001326412; NM_001326413; NM_001326414 NM_001326415; NM_001326416; NM_001326417; NM_001326418; NM_001326419; NM_001326420; NM_001326421; NM_178022	NM_177298; NM_001347332
RefSeq (protein)	NP_001313340; NP_001313341; NP_001313342; NP_001313343; NP_001313344 NP_001313345; NP_001313346; NP_001313347; NP_001313348; NP_001313349; NP_001313350; NP_055153; NP_821141	NP_001334261; NP_796272
Location (UCSC)	Chr 22: 31.62 – 31.66 Mb	Chr 5: 32.89 – 32.94 Mb
PubMed search
- Wikidata
View/Edit Human	View/Edit Mouse

phosphatidylserine decarboxylase

Identifiers
- EC no.: 4.1.1.65
- CAS no.: 9054-78-8

Databases
- BRENDA: enzyme data
- ExPASy: NiceZyme view
- KEGG: enzyme entry
- MetaCyc: metabolic pathway
- Rhea: reactions
- PDB structures: RCSB PDB PDBe PDBsum
- Gene Ontology: AmiGO / QuickGO
Search
- PMC: articles
- PubMed: articles
- NCBI: proteins

Phosphatidylserine decarboxylase

Identifiers
- Symbol: PSD
- Pfam: PF02666
- InterPro: IPR003817
- Membranome: 595
Available protein structures:
- PDB: IPR003817 PF02666 (ECOD; PDBsum)
- AlphaFold: IPR003817; PF02666

Phosphatidylserine decarboxylase is an enzyme that in humans is encoded by the PISD gene.

== Function ==
Phosphatidylserine decarboxylase (EC 4.1.1.65) catalyzes the chemical reaction

phosphatidyl-L-serine $\rightleftharpoons$ phosphatidylethanolamine + CO_{2}

This enzyme belongs to the family of lyases, specifically the carboxy-lyases, which cleave carbon-carbon bonds. The systematic name of this enzyme class is phosphatidyl-L-serine carboxy-lyase (phosphatidylethanolamine-forming). Other names in common use include PS decarboxylase, and phosphatidyl-L-serine carboxy-lyase. This enzyme participates in glycine, serine and threonine metabolism, and glycerophospholipid metabolism. It has two cofactors: pyridoxal phosphate, and Pyruvate.
