= NAPE-PLD =

NAPE-PLD may refer to:

- N-acyl-phosphatidylethanolamine-hydrolysing phospholipase D
- N-acyl phosphatidylethanolamine-specific phospholipase D, an enzyme
- N-acetylphosphatidylethanolamine-hydrolysing phospholipase D, an enzyme
