= Serine-phosphoethanolamine synthase =

Class of enzymes

Identifiers
- EC no.: 2.7.8.4
- CAS no.: 9023-23-8

Databases
- IntEnz: IntEnz view
- BRENDA: BRENDA entry
- ExPASy: NiceZyme view
- KEGG: KEGG entry
- MetaCyc: metabolic pathway
- PRIAM: profile
- PDB structures: RCSB PDB PDBe PDBsum
- Gene Ontology: AmiGO / QuickGO
Search
- PMC: articles
- PubMed: articles
- NCBI: proteins

Serine-phosphoethanolamine synthase (EC 2.7.8.4) is an enzyme that catalyzes the chemical reaction

CDP-ethanolamine
+
L-serine
cytidine monophosphate
+
L-serine phosphoethanolamine

The enzyme isolated from chicken combines cytidine diphosphate ethanolamine (CDP-ethanolamine) and L-serine to give cytidine monophosphate and L-serine phosphoethanolamine.

This enzyme is a transferases, specifically one transferring non-standard substituted phosphate groups. The systematic name of this enzyme class is CDP-ethanolamine:L-serine ethanolamine phosphotransferase. Other names in common use include serine ethanolamine phosphate synthetase, serine ethanolamine phosphodiester synthase, serine ethanolaminephosphotransferase, serine-phosphinico-ethanolamine synthase, and serinephosphoethanolamine synthase.
