= Medullipin =

Hormone

Medullipin is a hormone created by the interstitial cells of renal papilla, which is converted to medullipin II in the liver. This, in turn, results in vasodilation and decreased blood pressure.

There are two kinds of medullipin, known as medullipin 1 and medullipin 2.

The structure of this substance remains unknown, but its existence has been strongly inferred from multiple experiments in animals, wherein a rise in renal perfusion causes blood pressure to fall. This hypotensive response depends on an intact renal medulla and is not altered by renal denervation or the inhibition of the renin–angiotensin system (RAS) or autonomic nervous function
