= N-Acylphosphatidylethanolamine =

Type of hormones

N-Acylphosphatidylethanolamines (NAPEs) are hormones released by the small intestine into the bloodstream when it processes fat. NAPEs travel to the hypothalamus in the brain and suppress appetite. This mechanism could be relevant for treating obesity.

== Endocannabinoid precursor ==
N-Acylphosphatidylethanolamines are also an important intermediaries in the biosynthesis of endocannabinoids.

NAPEs are formed from phosphatidylethanolamines, a group of cell membrane phospholipids characteristic of nervous tissue. After being cleaved by phospholipases, NAPEs can be transformed into N-acylethanolamines, including the endocannabinoid anandamide. While NAPE-PLD is the enzyme responsible for catalyzing said release of N-acylethanolamine (NAE) from N-acyl-phosphatidylethanolamine (NAPE), this specific subtype of phospholipase D is not exclusively responsible for the formation of anandamide.

The crystal structure of human N-acyl phosphatidylethanolamine-specific phospholipase D (NAPE-PLD) reveals how this membrane enzyme generates anandamide and other bioactive lipid amides from membrane NAPEs. A hydrophobic cavity in NAPE-PLD provides an entryway for the substrate NAPE into the active site, where a binuclear zinc center orchestrates its hydrolysis. Unexpectedly, the structure unveils bile acids bind the membrane enzyme, enhancing dimer assembly and enabling catalysis. These findings suggest NAPE-PLD might orchestrate a direct crosstalk between bile acids and lipid amide signals.

== See also ==
- Ghrelin
- Leptin
