= Stearoylethanolamide =

Chemical compound

Names
- IUPAC name N-(2-Hydroxyethyl)octadecanamide

Identifiers
| CAS Number | 111-57-9 |
| 3D model (JSmol) | Interactive image |
| ChemSpider | 25958 |
| ECHA InfoCard | 100.003.531 |
| IUPHAR/BPS | 3621 |
| PubChem CID | 27902 |
| UNII | 03XV449Q24 |
| CompTox Dashboard (EPA) | DTXSID9042178 |
- InChI: InChI=1S/C20H41NO2/c1-2-3-4-5-6-7-8-9-10-11-12-13-14-15-16-17-20(23)21-18-19-22/h22H,2-19H2,1H3,(H,21,23) Key: OTGQIQQTPXJQRG-UHFFFAOYSA-N
- SMILES: CCCCCCCCCCCCCCCCCC(=O)NCCO

Properties
| Chemical formula | C_{20}H_{41}NO_{2} |
| Molar mass | 327.553 g·mol^{−1} |
- Except where otherwise noted, data are given for materials in their standard state (at 25 °C [77 °F], 100 kPa). Infobox references

Stearoylethanolamide (SEA) is an endocannabinoid neurotransmitter.

Stearoylethanolamide (C_{20}H_{41}NO_{2}; 18:0), also called N-(octadecanoyl)ethanolamine, is an endogenously formed N-acylethanolamine (NAE) and the ethanolamide of octadecanoic acid (C_{18}H_{36}O_{2}; 18:0) and ethanolamine (MEA: C_{2}H_{7}NO), and functionally related to an octadecanoic acid. SEA is produced by the phospholipase D hydrolysis of membrane phospholipids.

Within the class of NAEs, SEA is among anandamide, a major endocannibonoid that binds to CB1 and CB2, found in the brain and immune system, respectively. SEA, however, does not display any signs of binding to CB1/CB2 receptors, yet still has cannabimimetic activity.

Levels of SEA correlate with changes in pain intensity, indicating this SEA change, reflect the pain reduction effects of IPRP.

== Role in Neuroprotection ==
Neuroinflammation is triggered by a variety of neurodegenerative disorders and inflammatory conditions like infections, traumatic brain injury, and stress. Systemic inflammation can significantly alter blood–brain barrier (BBB) permeability via allowing infiltration by immune cells and causing structural damage to the glycocalyx.

SEA acts as a protective agent against this; it can result in a slower onset and also contribute to faster resolution of damage. One way in which SEA can do so is through lowering glutamate levels in the prefrontal cortex, which increases when inflamed. A high flow of glutamate results in greater recruitment of microglia to neurons, furthering the inflammatory response. With SEA, this cycle is interrupted and thus the initial neuroinflammatory state is dampened by keeping glutamate levels low. Another mechanism by which SEA acts a neuroprotective agent is through increasing 2-AG levels in the brain, which allows for smoother inflammatory response resolution.

== Role in Chronic Pain ==
Chronic pain is defined as persistent or recurring pain lasting longer than three months, going past the typical healing period of injury. NAEs, like SEA, play a role in remediating this inflammation, evidenced through their elevated levels during periods of pain.

A proposed mechanism of SEA function is as an agonist of the peroxisome proliferator-activated receptor gamma (PPARγ), competing against the antagonist GW9662 and agonist LY-171883, and overall contributing anti-inflammatory activity. SEA also has been shown to inhibit NF-κB activity, via blocking its translocation into the nuclei of macrophages by Lipopolysaccharide, and thereby suppressing pro-inflammatory cytokine production.
