= Linoleyl alcohol =

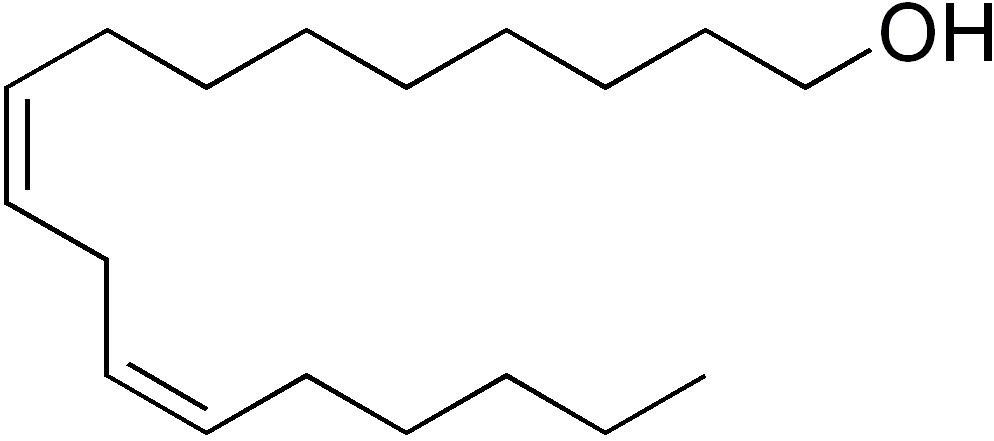

Names
- Preferred IUPAC name (9Z,12Z)-Octadeca-9,12-dien-1-ol

Identifiers
CAS Number	506-43-4
3D model (JSmol)	Interactive image
ChEBI	CHEBI:73534
ChemSpider	4517641
ECHA InfoCard	100.007.308
EC Number	208-038-1
PubChem CID	5365682
UNII	P4OX1289YW
CompTox Dashboard (EPA)	DTXSID50881240
- InChI: InChI=1S/C18H34O/c1-2-3-4-5-6-7-8-9-10-11-12-13-14-15-16-17-18-19/h6-7,9-10,19H,2-5,8,11-18H2,1H3/b7-6-,10-9- Key: JXNPEDYJTDQORS-HZJYTTRNSA-N
- SMILES: CCCCC/C=C\C/C=C\CCCCCCCCO

Properties
Chemical formula	C_{18}H_{34}O
Molar mass	266.469 g·mol^{−1}
Appearance	colorless oil
Density	0.8612 g/cm^{3}
Boiling point	153-4 0.4 kPa
- Except where otherwise noted, data are given for materials in their standard state (at 25 °C [77 °F], 100 kPa). verify (what is ?) Infobox references

Linoleyl alcohol is a fatty alcohol. A colorless oil, it is produced by the reduction of the carboxylic acid group in linoleic acid.
