= Methanandamide =

Names
- Preferred IUPAC name (5Z,8Z,11Z,14Z)-N-[(2R)-1-Hydroxypropan-2-yl]icosa-5,8,11,14-tetraenamide
- Other names AM-356; Arachidonyl-1'-hydroxy-2'-propylamide

Identifiers
CAS Number	157182-49-5
3D model (JSmol)	Interactive image
ChEMBL	ChEMBL120526
ChemSpider	4881984
IUPHAR/BPS	2506
PubChem CID	6321351
UNII	F4U8EF3PBH
- InChI: InChI=1S/C23H39NO2/c1-3-4-5-6-7-8-9-10-11-12-13-14-15-16-17-18-19-20-23(26)24-22(2)21-25/h7-8,10-11,13-14,16-17,22,25H,3-6,9,12,15,18-21H2,1-2H3,(H,24,26)/b8-7-,11-10-,14-13-,17-16-/t22-/m1/s1 Key: SQKRUBZPTNJQEM-FQPARAGTSA-N; InChI=1S/C23H39NO2/c1-3-4-5-6-7-8-9-10-11-12-13-14-15-16-17-18-19-20-23(26)24-22(2)21-25/h7-8,10-11,13-14,16-17,22,25H,3-6,9,12,15,18-21H2,1-2H3,(H,24,26)/b8-7-,11-10-,14-13-,17-16-/t22-/m1/s1 Key: SQKRUBZPTNJQEM-FQPARAGTBH
- SMILES: O=C(N[C@H](C)CO)CCC\C=C/C\C=C/C\C=C/C\C=C/CCCCC

Properties
Chemical formula	C_{23}H_{39}NO_{2}
Molar mass	361.570 g·mol^{−1}
- Except where otherwise noted, data are given for materials in their standard state (at 25 °C [77 °F], 100 kPa). verify (what is ?) Infobox references

Methanandamide (AM-356) is a synthetically created stable chiral analog of anandamide with improved metabolic stability. Its effects have been observed to act on the cannabinoid receptors (specifically on CB_{1} receptors, which are part of the central nervous system) found in different organisms such as mammals, fish, and certain invertebrates (e.g. Hydra).
