= Phosphatidylethanolamine =

Group of chemical compounds

Biosynthesis of various phospholipids (including phosphatidylethanolamine) in bacteria

Phosphatidylethanolamine (PE) is a class of phospholipids found in biological membranes. They are synthesized by the addition of cytidine diphosphate-ethanolamine to diglycerides, releasing cytidine monophosphate. S-Adenosyl methionine can subsequently methylate the amine of phosphatidylethanolamines to yield phosphatidylcholines.

== Function ==
The major membrane lipids: phosphatidylcholine (PtdCho); phosphatidylethanolamine (PtdEtn); phosphatidylinositol (PtdIns); phosphatidylserine (PtdSer).

=== In cells ===
Phosphatidylethanolamines are found in all living cells, composing 25% of all phospholipids. In human physiology, they are found particularly in nervous tissue such as the white matter of brain, nerves, neural tissue, and in spinal cord, where they make up 45% of all phospholipids.

Phosphatidylethanolamines play a role in membrane fusion and in disassembly of the contractile ring during cytokinesis in cell division. Additionally, it is thought that phosphatidylethanolamine regulates membrane curvature. Phosphatidylethanolamine is an important precursor, substrate, or donor in several biological pathways.

As a polar head group, phosphatidylethanolamine creates a more viscous lipid membrane compared to phosphatidylcholine. For example, the melting temperature of dioleoylphosphatidylethanolamine is -16 °C while the melting temperature of dioleoylphosphatidylcholine is -20 °C. If the lipids had two palmitoyl chains, phosphatidylethanolamine would melt at 63 °C while phosphatidylcholine would melt already at 41 °C. Lower melting temperatures correspond, in a simplistic view, to more fluid membranes.

=== In humans ===
In humans, metabolism of phosphatidylethanolamine is thought to be important in the heart. When blood flow to the heart is restricted, the asymmetrical distribution of phosphatidylethanolamine between membrane leaflets is disrupted, and as a result the membrane is disrupted. Additionally, phosphatidylethanolamine plays a role in the secretion of lipoproteins in the liver. This is because vesicles for secretion of very low-density lipoproteins coming off of the Golgi apparatus have a significantly higher phosphatidylethanolamine concentration when compared to other vesicles containing very low-density lipoproteins. Phosphatidylethanolamine has also shown to be able to propagate infectious prions without the assistance of any proteins or nucleic acids, which is a unique characteristic of it. Phosphatidylethanolamine is also thought to play a role in blood clotting, as it works with phosphatidylserine to increase the rate of thrombin formation by promoting binding to factor V and factor X, two proteins which catalyze the formation of thrombin from prothrombin. The synthesis of endocannabinoid anandamide is performed from the phosphatidylethanolamine by the successive action of two enzymes, N-acetyltransferase and phospholipase-D.

=== In bacteria ===
Where phosphatidylcholine is the principal phospholipid in animals, phosphatidylethanolamine is the principal one in bacteria. One of the primary roles for phosphatidylethanolamine in bacterial membranes is to spread out the negative charge caused by anionic membrane phospholipids. In the bacterium E. coli, phosphatidylethanolamine play a role in supporting lactose permeases active transport of lactose into the cell, and may play a role in other transport systems as well. Phosphatidylethanolamine plays a role in the assembly of lactose permease and other membrane proteins. It acts as a 'chaperone' to help the membrane proteins correctly fold their tertiary structures so that they can function properly. When phosphatidylethanolamine is not present, the transport proteins have incorrect tertiary structures and do not function correctly.

Phosphatidylethanolamine also enables bacterial multidrug transporters to function properly and allows the formation of intermediates that are needed for the transporters to properly open and close.

== Structure ==
Ethanolamine

As a lecithin, phosphatidylethanolamine consists of a combination of glycerol esterified with two fatty acids and phosphoric acid. Whereas the phosphate group is combined with choline in phosphatidylcholine, it is combined with ethanolamine in phosphatidylethanolamine. The two fatty acids may be identical or different, and are usually found in positions 1,2 (less commonly in positions 1,3).

== Synthesis ==
The phosphatidylserine decarboxylation pathway and the cytidine diphosphate-ethanolamine pathways are used to synthesize phosphatidylethanolamine. Phosphatidylserine decarboxylase is the enzyme that is used to decarboxylate phosphatidylserine in the first pathway. The phosphatidylserine decarboxylation pathway is the main source of synthesis for phosphatidylethanolamine in the membranes of the mitochondria. Phosphatidylethanolamine produced in the mitochondrial membrane is also transported throughout the cell to other membranes for use. In a process that mirrors phosphatidylcholine synthesis, phosphatidylethanolamine is also made via the cytidine diphosphate-ethanolamine pathway, using ethanolamine as the substrate. Through several steps taking place in both the cytosol and endoplasmic reticulum, the synthesis pathway yields the end product of phosphatidylethanolamine. Phosphatidylethanolamine is also found abundantly in soy or egg lecithin and is produced commercially using chromatographic separation.

=== Regulation ===
Synthesis of phosphatidylethanolamine through the phosphatidylserine decarboxylation pathway occurs rapidly in the inner mitochondrial membrane. However, phosphatidylserine is made in the endoplasmic reticulum. Because of this, the transport of phosphatidylserine from the endoplasmic reticulum to the mitochondrial membrane and then to the inner mitochondrial membrane limits the rate of synthesis via this pathway. The mechanism for this transport is currently unknown but may play a role in the regulation of the rate of synthesis in this pathway.

== Presence in food, health issues ==
Phosphatidylethanolamines in food break down to form phosphatidylethanolamine-linked Amadori products as a part of the Maillard reaction. These products accelerate membrane lipid peroxidation, causing oxidative stress to cells that come in contact with them. Oxidative stress is known to cause food deterioration and several diseases. Significant levels of Amadori-phosphatidylethanolamine products have been found in a wide variety of foods such as chocolate, soybean milk, infant formula, and other processed foods. The levels of Amadori-phosphatidylethanolamine products are higher in foods with high lipid and sugar concentrations that have high temperatures in processing. Additional studies have found that Amadori-phosphatidylethanolamine may play a role in vascular disease, act as the mechanism by which diabetes can increase the incidence of cancer, and potentially play a role in other diseases as well. Amadori-phosphatidylethanolamine has a higher plasma concentration in diabetes patients than healthy people, indicating it may play a role in the development of the disease or be a product of the disease.

== See also ==
- N-Acylphosphatidylethanolamine
- Phosphatidyl ethanolamine methyltransferase
