= Endocannabinoid reuptake inhibitor =

Class of drugs

Endocannabinoid reuptake inhibitors (eCBRIs), also called cannabinoid reuptake inhibitors (CBRIs), are drugs which limit the reabsorption of endocannabinoid neurotransmitters by the releasing neuron.

== Pharmacology ==
The method of transport of endocannabinoids through the cell membrane and cytoplasm to their respective degradation enzymes has been rigorously debated for nearly two decades, and a putative endocannabinoid membrane transporter was proposed. However, as lipophilic molecules endocannabinoids readily pass through the cell lipid bilayer without assistance and would more likely need a chaperone through the cytoplasm to the endoplasmic reticulum where the enzyme FAAH is located. More recently fatty acid-binding proteins (FABPs) and heat shock proteins (Hsp70s) have been described and verified as such chaperones, and their inhibitors have been synthesized. The inhibition of endocannabinoid reuptake raises the amount of those neurotransmitters available in the synaptic cleft and therefore increases neurotransmission. Following the increase of neurotransmission in the endocannabinoid system is the stimulation of its functions which, in humans, include: suppression of pain perception (analgesia), increased appetite, mood elevation and inhibition of short-term memory.

== Examples of eCBRIs ==
- AM404 – active metabolite of paracetamol (acetaminophen)
- AM1172
- Guineensine
- LY-2183240
- O-2093
- OMDM-2
- RX-055
- SYT-510
- UCM-707
- VDM-11
- WOBE437

== See also ==
- Endocannabinoid enhancer
- Endocannabinoid system
- Reuptake inhibitor
- Cannabinoid receptor antagonist
- Endocannabinoid transporters
- FAAH inhibitor
- MAGL inhibitor
