= CBI =

CBI may refer to:

== Organisations ==
=== Banks ===
- Central Bank of Iceland
- Central Bank of India
- Central Bank of Iran
- Central Bank of Iraq
- Central Bank of Ireland

=== Law enforcement ===
- California Bureau of Investigation, a state police force in USA
- Central Bureau of Investigation, a federal agency of India
- Colorado Bureau of Investigation, a state police force

=== Other organisations ===
- Center for the Promotion of Imports (Dutch: Centrum tot Bevordering van de Import uit ontwikkelingslanden, CBI), an agency of the Netherlands Ministry of Foreign Affairs
- Charles Babbage Institute, a research center at the University of Minnesota
- Chicago Bridge & Iron Company, a large engineering and construction company
- Commonwealth Builders, Inc., forerunner established in 1934 of the Washington Commonwealth Federation
- Confederation of British Industry, an organisation promoting United Kingdom businesses

== Places and installations ==
- Cardiff Bus Interchange, is a bus interchange next to Cardiff Central railway station
- Center for Biomedical Imaging, a research facility of Boston University Medical Center
- Central Bukidnon Institute, a secondary school in the Philippines
- China Burma India Theater, a theater of World War II
- Community Boating, Inc, a non-profit community boating center on the Charles River in Boston, Massachusetts
- Cosmic Background Imager, a radio telescope in the Chilean Andes

== Radio ==
- CBI (AM), radio station broadcast in Sydney, Nova Scotia, Canada
- CBI-FM, radio station broadcast in Sydney, Nova Scotia, Canada

== Other ==
- Caribbean Basin Initiative, a United States economic recovery program
- CBI (film series), an Indian film series about the Central Bureau of Investigation
- Central bank independence, monetary theory
- Citizenship by investment, a type of immigrant investor program
- College Basketball Invitational, an American college basketball tournament
- College Bowl, Inc., owner of College Bowl, an American televised quiz tournament
- Computer-based interlocking, a type of railway signal interlocking
- Content-based instruction, a method of teaching a second-language teaching.
- Continuous bladder irrigation

== See also ==
- CB1 (disambiguation)
- CBL (disambiguation)
- CBIS (disambiguation)
