= Endocannabinoid enhancer =

Type of cannabinoidergic drug

An endocannabinoid enhancer (eCBE) is a type of cannabinoidergic drug that enhances the activity of the endocannabinoid system by increasing extracellular concentrations of endocannabinoids. Examples of different types of eCBEs include fatty acid amide hydrolase (FAAH) inhibitors, monoacylglycerol lipase (MAGL) inhibitors, and endocannabinoid transporter (eCBT) inhibitors (or "endocannabinoid reuptake inhibitors" ("eCBRIs")). An example of an actual eCBE is AM404, the active metabolite of the analgesic paracetamol (acetaminophen; Tylenol) and a dual FAAH inhibitor and eCBRI.

== See also ==
- Cannabinoid receptor
- Synthetic cannabinoid
- Cannabinoid receptor antagonist
