= Docosatetraenoylethanolamide =

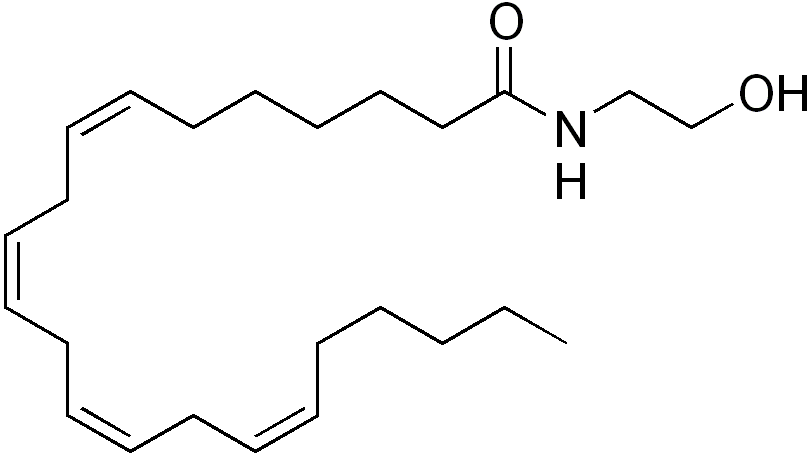

Names
- Preferred IUPAC name (7Z,10Z,13Z,16Z)-N-(2-Hydroxyethyl)docosa-7,10,13,16-tetraenamide
- Other names DEA

Identifiers
CAS Number	150314-35-5
3D model (JSmol)	Interactive image
ChEMBL	ChEMBL321585
ChemSpider	4445444
IUPHAR/BPS	5445
PubChem CID	5282273
CompTox Dashboard (EPA)	DTXSID501028460
- InChI: InChI=1S/C24H41NO2/c1-2-3-4-5-6-7-8-9-10-11-12-13-14-15-16-17-18-19-20-21-24(27)25-22-23-26/h6-7,9-10,12-13,15-16,26H,2-5,8,11,14,17-23H2,1H3,(H,25,27)/b7-6-,10-9-,13-12-,16-15- Key: FMVHVRYFQIXOAF-DOFZRALJSA-N
- SMILES: CCCCC/C=C\C/C=C\C/C=C\C/C=C\CCCCCC(=O)NCCO

Properties
Chemical formula	C_{24}H_{41}NO_{2}
Molar mass	375.59 g/mol
- Except where otherwise noted, data are given for materials in their standard state (at 25 °C [77 °F], 100 kPa). verify (what is ?) Infobox references

Docosatetraenoylethanolamide (DEA) (Adrenoyl-ethanolamide) (Adrenoyl-EA) is an endogenous ethanolamide that has been shown to act on the cannabinoid (CB_{1}) receptor. DEA is similar in structure to anandamide (AEA, a recognized endogenous ligand for the CB_{1} receptor), containing docosatetraenoic acid in place of arachidonic acid. While DEA has been shown to bind to the CB_{1} receptor with similar potency and efficacy as AEA, its role as a cannabinergic neurotransmitter is not well understood.

Docosatetraenoylethanolamide (DEA) has been found in Tropaeolum tuberosum (Mashua) and Leonotis leonurus (Wild Dagga / Lion's Tail).
