= Ethanolamide =

Class of chemical compounds

Chemical structure of the ethanolamide anandamide

Ethanolamides are chemical compounds which are amides formed from carboxylic acids and ethanolamine. Some ethanolamides are naturally occurring, such as anandamide, palmitoylethanolamide and prostamides, which play physiological roles as lipid neurotransmitters and autacoids.

The crystal structure of the membrane enzyme NAPE-PLD has revealed how these endogenous ethanolamides are generated from cell membranes, and that bile acids play a role in their production.

Ethanolamides can be prepared synthetically by heating esters with ethanolamine.

== See also ==
- Diethanolamide
- Docosatetraenoylethanolamide
- Oleoylethanolamide
