= Prostamide =

Prostamide E_{2}, the first prostamide to be discovered

Prostamides are a class of physiologically active, lipid-like substances chemically related to prostaglandins. They occur naturally in humans and other animals. The first prostamide, called prostamide E_{2}, was discovered in 1997.

== Biochemistry ==
Anandamide, the precursor of prostamides

Prostamides are synthesized in the body from anandamide, which is the ethanolamide of arachidonic acid (ARA). This pathway is parallel to the synthesis of prostaglandins from ARA itself. The enzymes involved are at least partly the same as those responsible for prostaglandin synthesis.

It is thought that prostamides act via a specific receptor (or several receptors) which is distinct from the prostaglandin receptors. No such receptor has been identified as of 2015.

== Nomenclature ==
The names of prostamides are derived from the corresponding prostaglandin. For example, prostamide E_{2} is the ethanolamide of prostaglandin E_{2} (dinoprostone).

== Clinical significance ==
The anti-glaucoma drug bimatoprost is a derivative of prostamide F_{2α}, and is thought to have the same mechanism of action.

Importantly, prostaglandin F2α ethanolamide inhibits preadipocyte differentiation and increases their proliferation. This mechanism maintains a reserve of adipocyte progenitor cells. This might allow for healthier development of fat tissue, which is through hyperplasia that outbalances morbid hypertrophy and ectopic fat deposition. Hyperplasia allows for storing excess energy triglycerides in more and smaller fat cells, instead of continually increasing the size of fat cells that leads to inflammation, ectopic fat deposits and fat tissue hypoxia. These findings have been behind the foundation of the Fat Four Ps Hypothesis, namely, Preadipocyte Pool Preservation by prostaglandin F2α ethanolamide. This mechanism could be tightly balanced as it can be controlled through the feedback control loop that involves this anti-adipogenic metabolite and its pro-adipogenic precursor anandamide (AEA). This has further suggested prostaglandin F2α ethanolamide synthetic pharmaceutical analog Bimatoprost as a promising therapy for obesity.
