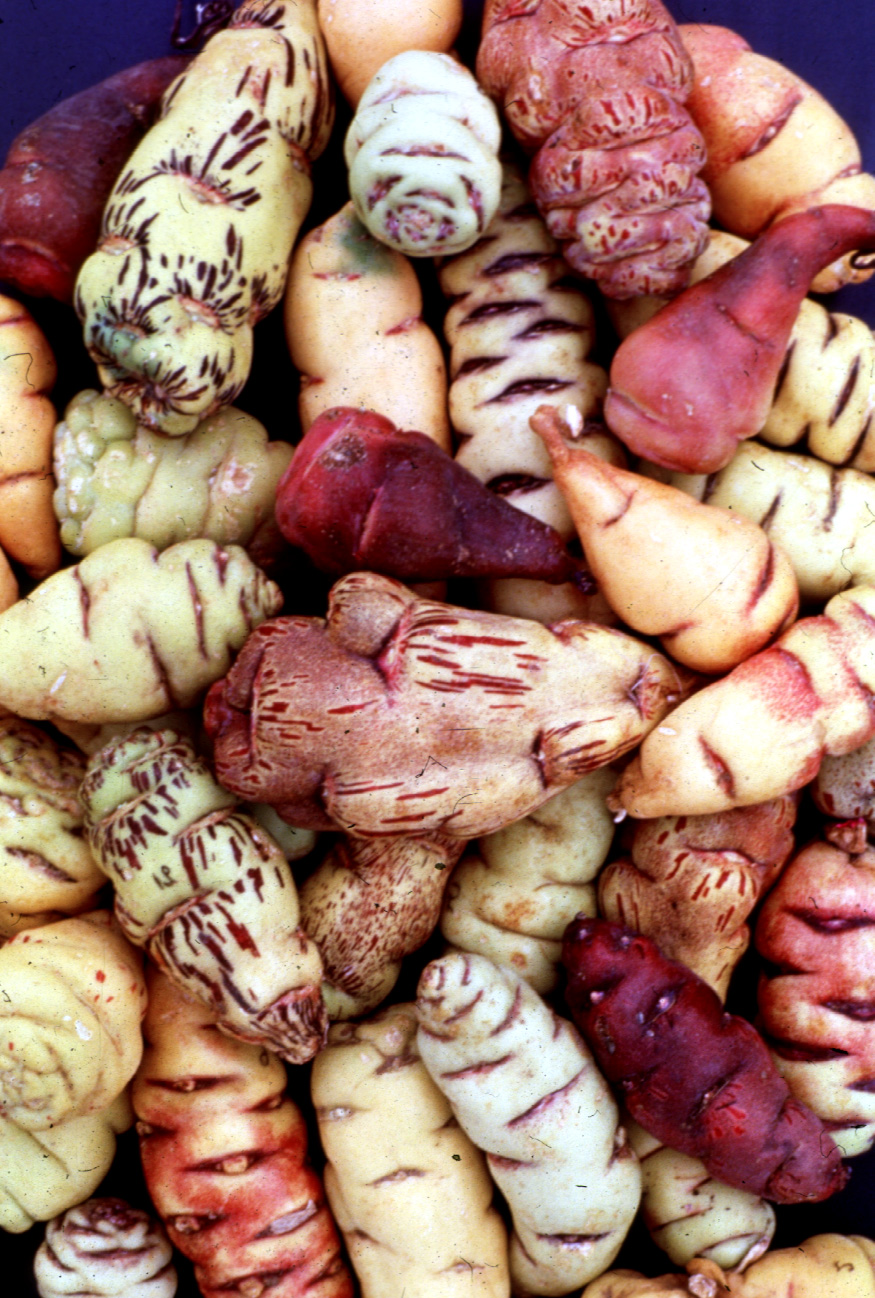
- Various mashua tubers of different shapes and pigmentations

Scientific classification
- Kingdom: Plantae
- Clade: Tracheophytes
- Clade: Angiosperms
- Clade: Eudicots
- Clade: Rosids
- Order: Brassicales
- Family: Tropaeolaceae
- Genus: Tropaeolum
- Species: T. tuberosum

Binomial name
- Tropaeolum tuberosum Ruíz & Pav.

Synonyms
- Chymocarpus tuberosus (Ruiz & Pav.) Heynh.; Trophaeum tuberosum (Ruiz & Pav.) Kuntze

= Tropaeolum tuberosum =

Mashua

Species of flowering plant

Tropaeolum tuberosum (mashua, see below for other names) is a species of flowering plant in the family Tropaeolaceae, grown in the Andes, particularly in Peru and Bolivia, and to a lesser extent in Ecuador as well as in some areas of Colombia, for its edible tubers, which are eaten cooked or roasted as a vegetable. It is a minor food source, especially for native Amerindian populations. Mashua is a herbaceous perennial climber growing to 2–4 m (7–13 ft) in height. It is related to garden nasturtiums, and is occasionally cultivated as an ornamental for its brightly coloured tubular flowers. The leaves are peltate, roundly five-lobed with a petiole that twines weakly but is not truly a tendril. The root is tuberous.

== Alternative names ==
This plant is commonly called mashua in Peru and Ecuador, but other names include:

- mashwa (Ecuador and Peru)
- maswallo
- mazuko
- mascho (Peru)
- añu (in Peru and Bolivia)
- isaño
- cubio (in Colombia)
- oca (in Colombia)
- tuberous nasturtium

In Boyacá, Colombia, it is also named nabo.

== Agronomy ==
The plant thrives even in marginal soils and competes well with weeds. It is well-adapted to high-altitude subsistence agriculture and gives high yields; 30 tonnes per hectare are yielded at 3000 meters, but up to 70 tons per hectare have been produced under research conditions. Its extraordinary resistance to insects, nematode and bacterial pests is attributed to high levels of isothiocyanates. Although mashua is fully domesticated, it can persist in wild vegetation because of its aggressive growth and robustness. In Colombia, it is planted as a companion crop to repel pests in potato fields. Mashua’s high natural resistance to pests has made it a good crop for its potential in pest management. Glucosinolates contained in the plant have been shown to harm aphid herbivory. Spraying a crop with a mixture containing glucosinolates sourced from mashua can lead to up to 97% of aphid mortality. Molecules extracted from mashua can be part of a viable, effective, and eco-friendly alternative to synthetic pesticides. Traits like these raise the potential for mashua to be used in agroecology.

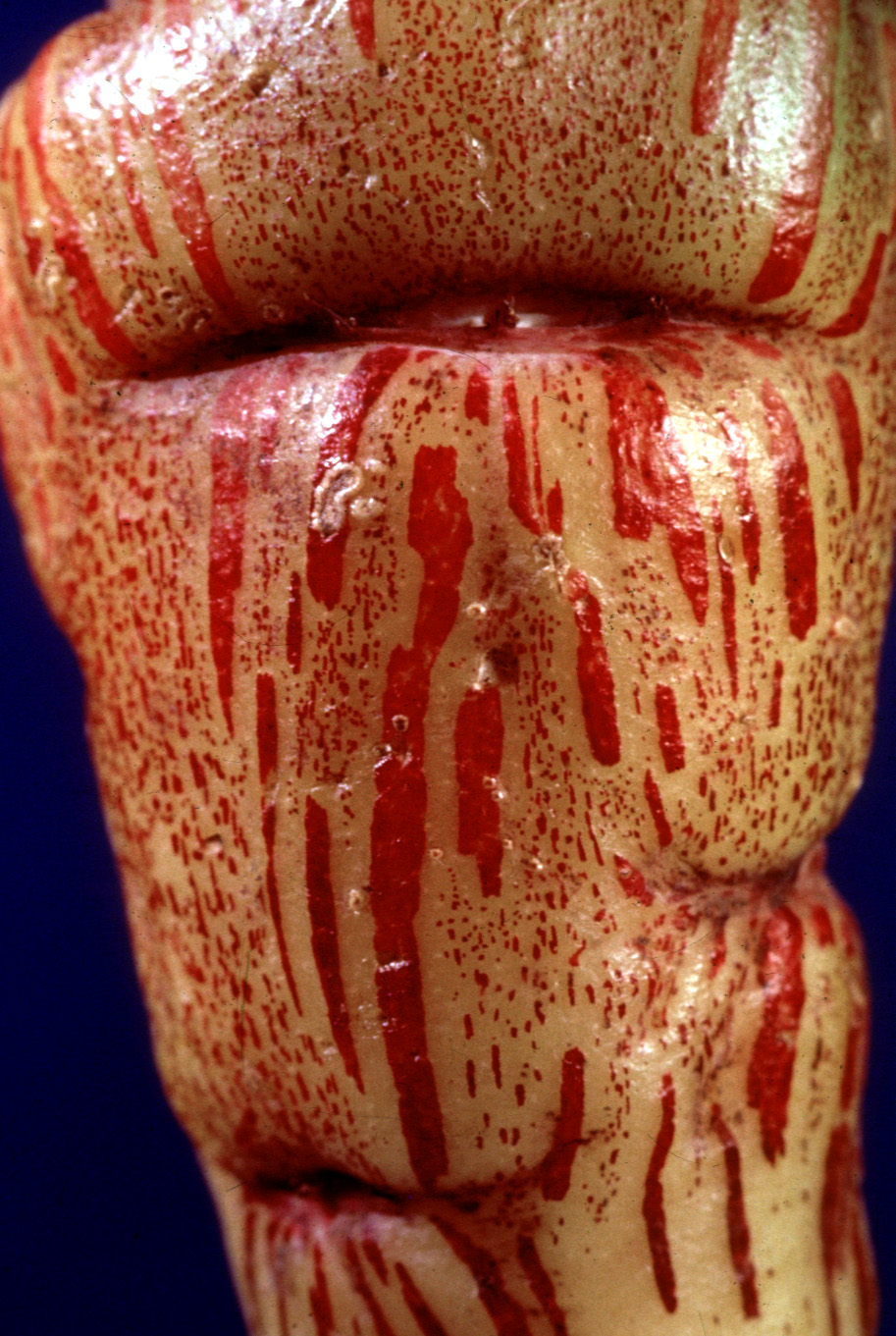
Popular Peruvian cultivar Yawar Waqay, meaning "weeping blood"

== Culinary use ==
Raw mashua tuber is bitter due to glucosinolates, but the bitterness diminishes after cooking, freezing, or pounding. The tubers comprise as much as 75 percent of the mature plants by dry weight.

Popularization of mashua may be limited by its intense flavor and reputation as an anaphrodisiac. Father Bernabé Cobo records that in the 16th century, the Inca used to give enormous amounts of mashua to their troops so that they would forget their wives. However, mashua tubers roasted in traditional earthen field ovens, built at harvest, are considered a delicacy. Also, the raw tubers can be shredded thinly and added to salads to confer a spicy flavor and crunchy texture.

== Cultivation as an ornamental ==
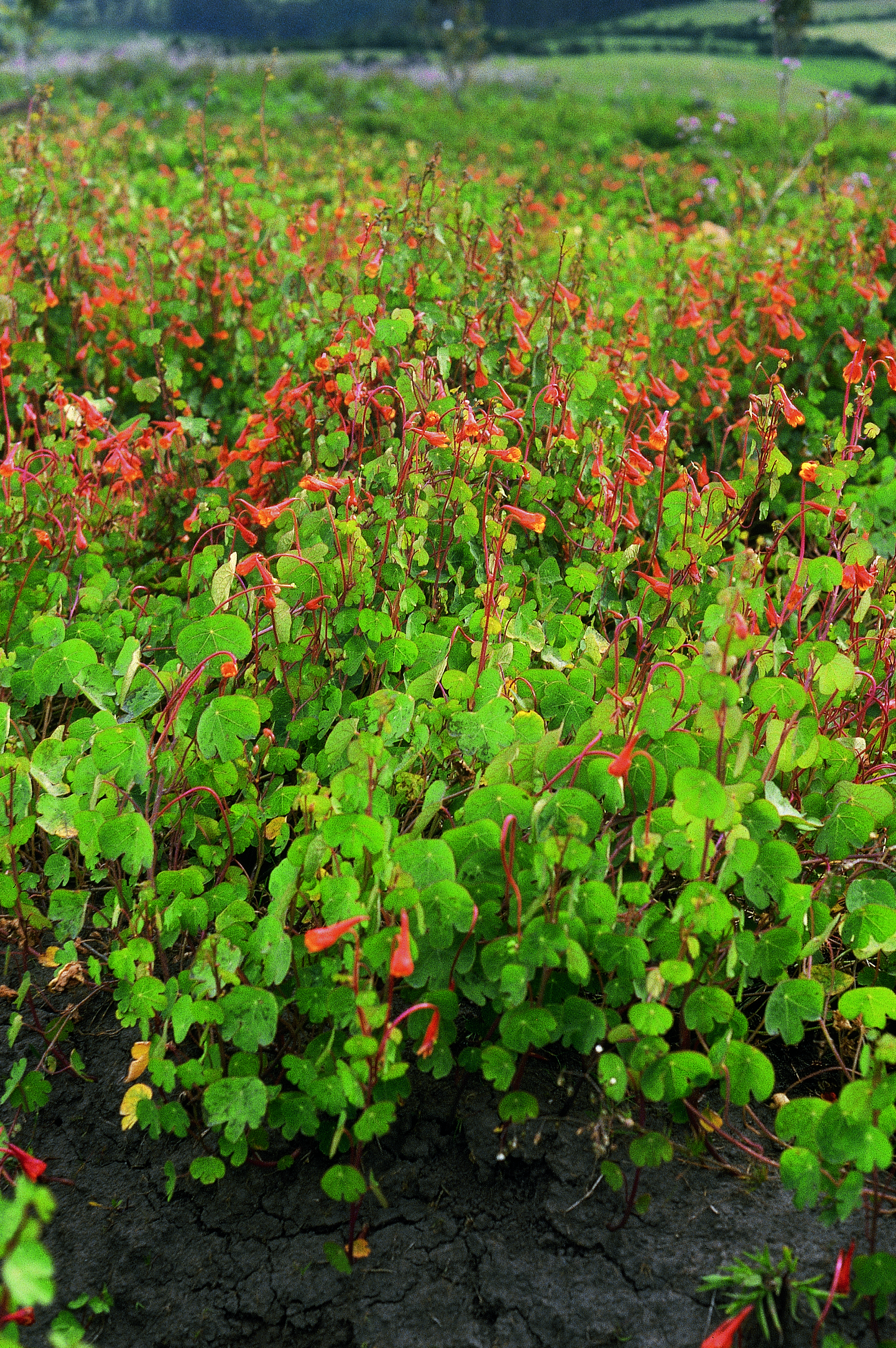
Flowering mashua plants near Quito, Ecuador, 1990

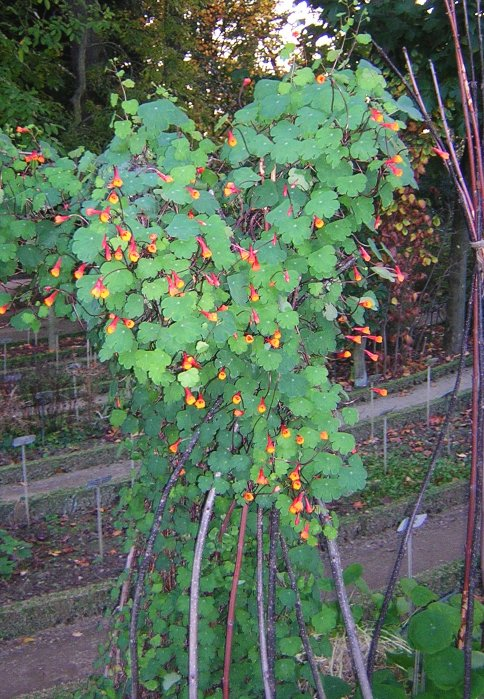
Cultivated

In its native range, mashua is mainly cultivated for its edible tubers. Still, it has ornamental value in the temperate zone because of its trailing habit and showy, bi-colored tubular flowers, which appear in summer and autumn. The sepals are orange-red, while the petals are bright yellow. In areas prone to frost, some protection is required in winter. The cultivar T. tuberosum var. lineamaculatum 'Ken Aslet' has gained the Royal Horticultural Society's Award of Garden Merit.

== Medicinal properties ==
Mashua has putative anaphrodisiac effects. It has been recorded by the Spanish chronicler Cobo that mashua was fed to their armies by the Inca Emperors, "that they should forget their wives". Studies of male rats fed on mashua tubers have shown a 45% drop in testosterone levels due to the presence of isothiocyanates. Mashua contains docosatetraenoylethanolamide, a cannabinoid structurally similar to anandamide that also acts on the cannabinoid (CB_{1}) receptor among other structurally related compounds such as N–oleoyldopamine. Topical mashua in a 1% gel formulation has proven to increase the healing activities of open wounds in mice populations. Further studies are necessary to determine potential wound healing success for human application.

== Nutrition ==
=== Macronutrients ===
==== Proteins ====
Mashua is a food item known for its exceptional nutritional properties. The protein content of the dry weight was reported to be about 6.9–15.7%. It has a remarkable protein profile with a considerable abundance of essential amino acids in an ideal ratio, providing a high biological value. The essential amino acids leucine, isoleucine, and valine are branched-chain amino acids (BCAA), which are essential in muscle metabolism. The amount of free amino acids ranges from 2.763 to 6.826 mg/g dry matter. Variations occur depending on the region of cultivation and the specific mashua genotype.

==== Fats ====
The fat content of the dry weight of mashua is between 0.1–0.4%. The investigation of the fatty acid composition of mashua flour by Ramallo (2004) showed a significant content of polyunsaturated fatty acids of 70.8%. The most abundant fatty acids are linoleic acid (48.7%), α-linolenic acid (22.13%), palmitic acid (21.2%) and oleic acid (3.96%). Ideally, the omega-6 to omega-3 fatty acid ratio should be between 1 and 4. For mashua the ratio between linoleic acid (omega-6) and the α-linolenic acid (omega-3) is 2.2 and therefore in the optimum range.

==== Carbohydrates ====
Mashua is considered a good source of carbohydrates. The carbohydrate content of the dry weight of mashua is between 69.7–79.5%, depending on factors like growing conditions and variety of mashua species. It primarily comprises starch, which manifests in the form of grains. These starch grains comprise 27% amylose and 73% amylopectin, contributing to the overall carbohydrate profile. Approximately 85% of the starch content is readily digestible, while 15% remains indigestible within the gastrointestinal tract.

==== Fibers ====
The tubers of the mashua are a good source of dietary fiber. Mashua tubers contain approximately 5 to 7 g of fiber per 100 g of dry matter, depending on factors like growing conditions and the variety of mashua species. Dietary fiber content is supposed to have beneficial health effects and help relieve functional constipation, a common gastrointestinal problem in children.

=== Micronutrients ===
==== Vitamins ====
Mashua contains substantial levels of vitamin C, as well as β-carotene, which can be converted into vitamin A. The levels of vitamin C in mashua are influenced by both the geographical area where it is grown and its genetic profile. A study conducted by Coloma et al. in 2022 found that the vitamin C levels in yellow mashua tubers range from 0.53 to 1.54 mg/g dry matter. The tubers that display both yellow and purple hues demonstrate a considerably higher vitamin C concentration, with a range of 0.9 to 3.36 mg/g dry matter. In comparison, potatoes, a more commonly known tuber, have a lower vitamin C content, with a range of 0.27 to 0.87 mg/g dry matter. This indicates that mashua can contain approximately two to four times more vitamin C than potatoes.

Like vitamin C, the levels of β-carotene in tubers also fluctuate according to the cultivation location and the plant's genotype. For yellow tubers, β-carotene content ranges from 18.10 to 715.95 μg/g dry matter. The concentration spans from 6.91 to 336.33 μg/g dry matter in tubers with a yellow-purple hue. Conversely, purple tubers exhibit a β-carotene content significantly lower, varying from 1.21 to 4.46 μg/g dry matter.

==== Minerals ====
An important aspect of mashua’s appeal lies in its rich mineral composition, which, as the vitamin content, also varies according to the cultivation site and genotype.

Mineral content in different mashua tuber varieties
Mineral (mg/100 g DM)	Yellow Tubers	Yellow-Purple Tubers	Purple Tubers
Calcium	35.61 - 51.34	34.78 - 46.89	35.66 - 53.32
Phosphorus	142.47 - 179.31	114.56 - 139.90	146.95 - 191.55
Iron	7.51 - 7.81	7.02 - 7.66	7.57 - 7.69
Potassium	1723.42 - 2021.14	1742.54 - 1789.77	1767.26 - 1875.61
Zinc (ppm)	4.15 - 11.63	4.53 - 11.99	4.11 - 9.94

The table delineates the mineral content corresponding to each genotype. Regarding calcium content, mashua exhibits a lower concentration than potatoes, with the latter containing approximately 13,100 mg/100 g dry matter. In contrast, the phosphorus content of mashua is considerably higher than that of potatoes, which have a mere 0.23 mg/100 g dry matter. While potatoes present a significant amount of potassium at 500 mg/100 g dry matter, which surpasses the levels found in purple mashua tubers, they still hold merely a third of the potassium content when contrasted with yellow and yellow-purple mashua varieties. In addition to carotenoids, it also contains phenolic compounds such as gallic acid, anthocyanins and flavonoids.

== See also ==
- Oca
- New World crops
- Ulluco
- Yacon
