= C22H33NO3 =

The molecular formula C_{22}H_{33}NO_{3} (molar mass: 359.510 g/mol) may refer to:

- Cyclomethycaine
- WOBE437
