= CBIS =

CBIS may stand for:

- Central Bureau of Investigation and Statistics, former civilian intelligence agency of the Republic of China (1912-1949).
- The Chinese Biological Investigators Society: a non-profit professional organization of life sciences and education.
- Columbia Books & Information Services: an American company that serves as a publisher of reference works, online databases, and mailing lists.
- Caleb British International School, an international school in Lekki, Lagos State, Nigeria

== See also ==
- CBI (disambiguation) for the singular of CBIs
