= C27H39NO2 =

The molecular formula C_{27}H_{39}NO_{2} (molar mass: 409.60 g/mol, exact mass: 409.2981 u) may refer to:

- VDM-11
- Veratramine
