= SYT =

SYT may refer to:

- Synaptotagmin, a family of membrane-trafficking proteins that are characterized by an N-terminal transmembrane region
- SYT, the Bangladesh Railway station code for Sylhet railway station, Bangladesh
- SYT, the China Railway telegraph code for Shenyang railway station, Liaoning, China
- SYT, the IATA airport code for Saint-Yan Airport, France
- SYT, the National Rail station code for Somerleyton railway station, East Suffolk, England
- SYT, alias for SS18, a member of the human SWI/SNF chromatin remodelling complex

== See also ==
- SYT-510
