= Anaphrodisiac =

Substance that quells or blunts the libido

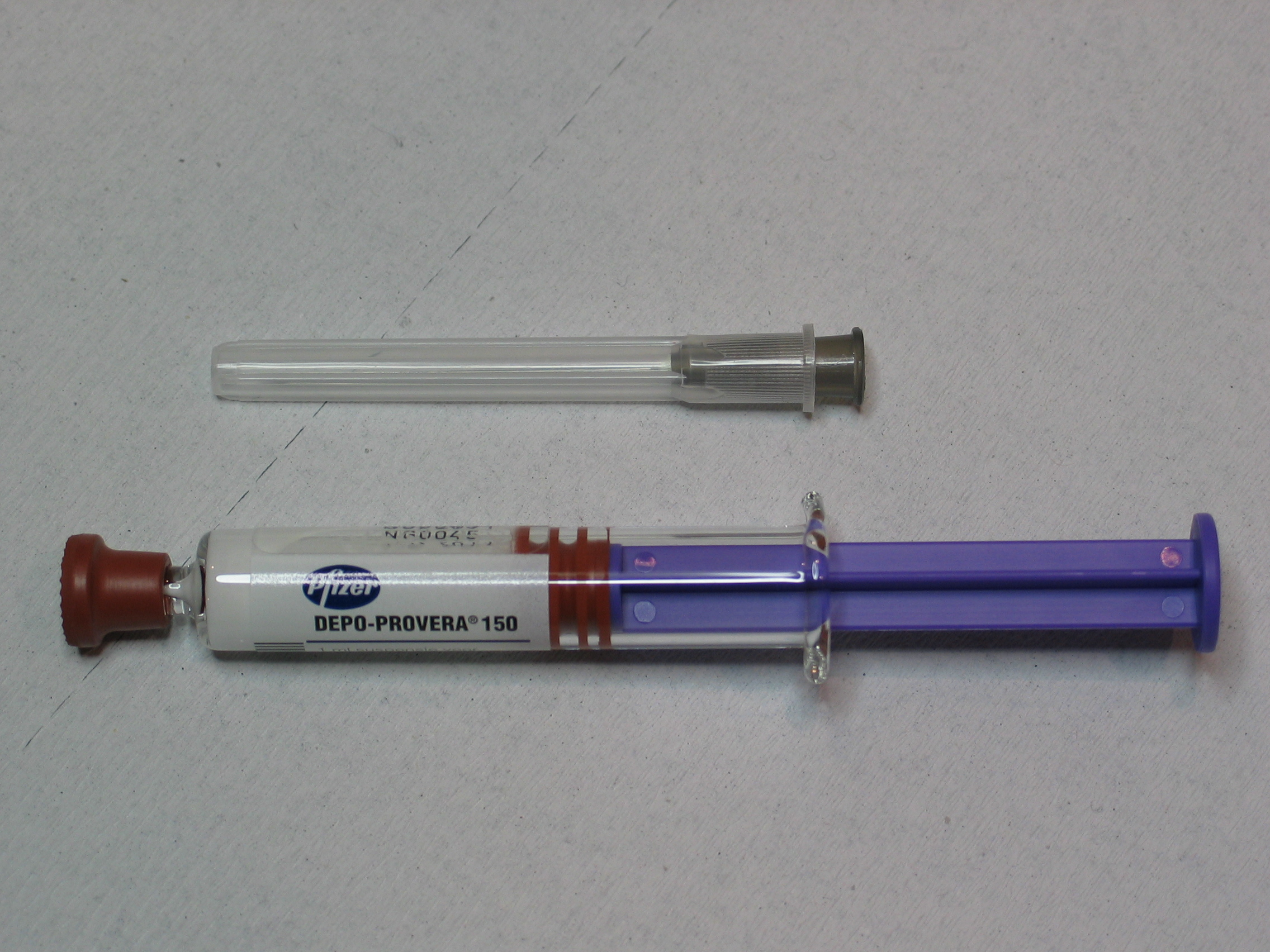
Depo-Provera is usually used for birth control, but it can also be used on men to reduce libido

An anaphrodisiac (also antaphrodisiac or antiaphrodisiac) is a substance that quells or blunts the libido. It is the opposite of an aphrodisiac, something that enhances sexual appetite. The word anaphrodisiac comes from the Greek privative prefix ἀν-, denoting negation, and aphrodisiac, from the Greek goddess of love, Aphrodite. Some people use anaphrodisiacs in order to curb a very high libido or due to hypersexuality. However anaphrodisiacs are also used by those with an average libido, at times due to having incessant schedules.

== Available anaphrodisiacs classes of substances ==
Some common anaphrodisiacs are ethanol (alcohol) and tobacco, but this is typically an unintended consequence and not often the main reason for use. While alcohol is used socially because it initially reduces mental inhibitions, studies have shown that over time alcohol physically decreases arousal and makes achieving climax more difficult. For this reason, alcohol is considered an anaphrodisiac.

== History ==
Herbal anaphrodisiacs have been employed by various religious sects and orders throughout history. Barrister Sir Edward Marshall Hall theorised that murderer Hawley Harvey Crippen was using hyoscine on his wife as an anaphrodisiac but accidentally gave her an overdose and then panicked when she died. Various forms of anaphrodisiacs have been tried to cure hypersexuality in both humans and non-human animals. In both medieval history and modern times, anaphrodisiacs have been used as a tool intended to reduce the sex drive of sex offenders.

== Scientific study ==
Studies have evaluated the effect of herbal anaphrodisiacs on men and women. These include studies on the effect of substances on both hormone levels and behaviour.

The mechanism of the active component of some plant-based anaphrodisiacs may be the inhibition of enzymes that catalyze the conversion of sex-hormone precursors into androstenedione, which promotes the reduction of sexual urges. Studies have demonstrated that some of these products inhibit 17β-hydroxysteroid dehydrogenase and 17,20-lyase, which catalyzes the conversion of 17α-hydroxyprogesterone to androstenedione to testosterone.

In one study a group of men were given an anaphrodisiac and the effect on the metabolism of mineralocorticoids in these men was recorded. During the period of administration, the testosterone concentrations decreased and the serum 17α-hydroxyprogesterone concentrations increased. Testosterone levels fell by about 40% after administration and returned to normal after usage was discontinued. However, the actual effect of these medicines on sexual desire was not measured in the study.

The amino acid 5-HTP, or 5-hydroxytryptophan, has been anecdotally reported to be a mild anaphrodisiac, as has the serotonergic empathogen MDMA, popularly known as "ecstasy". However, systematic study of these chemicals is lacking, due to the off-patent nature of 5-HTP, and the legal control of MDMA. In addition, other serotonergic euphoriant drugs, like the psychedelic LSD, have been reportedly used to drastically increase sexual pleasure. MDMA in combination with a PDE5 inhibitor (trade names Viagra, Levitra, and Cialis) is termed "sextasy". This combination increases libido and performance simultaneously. A PDE5 inhibitor taken alone has no effect on sex drive, suggesting that serotonergic euphoriants like MDMA may actually increase libido while decreasing performance, similar to alcohol.

A 2003 study has found that glycyrrhizin, the compound in liquorice root, can lower levels of testosterone. The findings back up a previous study about the hormonal effects of liquorice (whose results could not be replicated in other studies in the past). The scientists came to the conclusion that the regular consumption of liquorice can lower libido in men. However, the study also showed that the level of testosterone normalizes after abstinence of liquorice within a few days and the effects completely disappear.

== List of putative anaphrodisiacs ==
- Chasteberry
- Common rue
- Mashua
- Boldo
- White lily
- Licorice

== See also ==
- Aphrodisiac
- Chemical castration

=== Categories ===
Category Drug classes defined by psychological effects not found
Drugs by psychological effects
Psychoactive drugs
