= AM404 =

Active metabolite of paracetamol

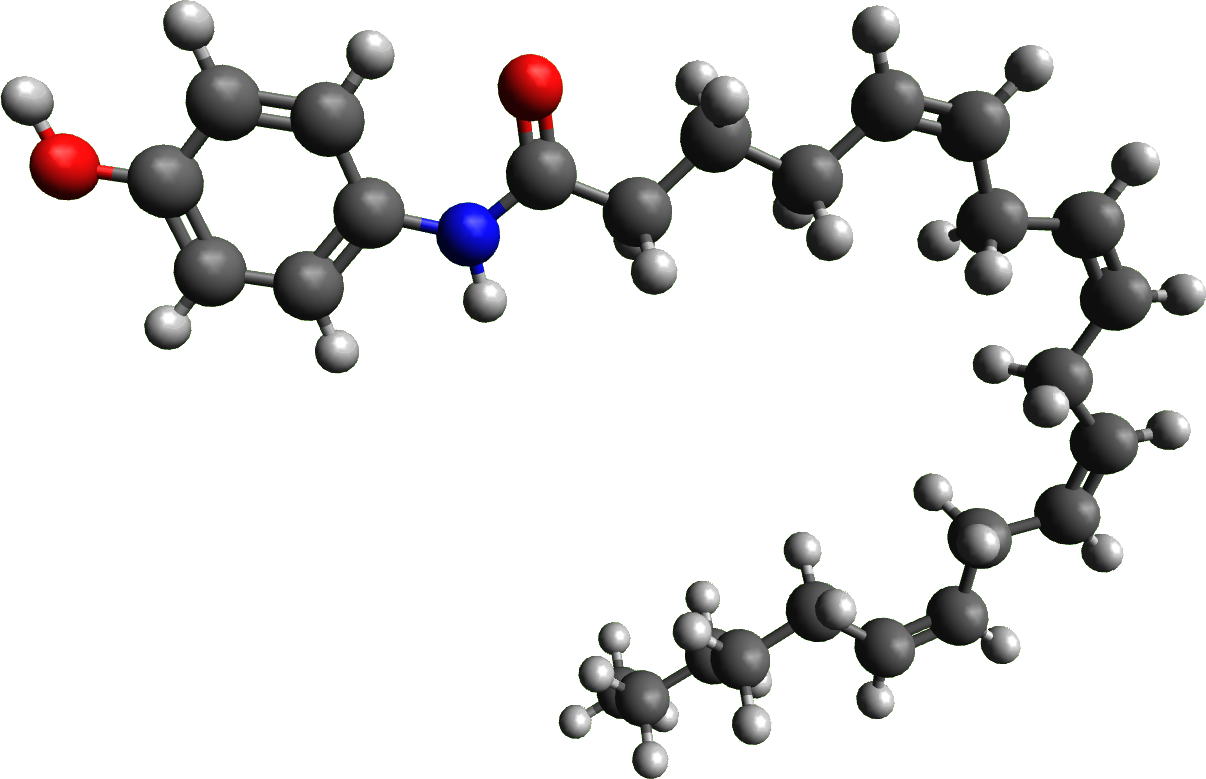

Identifiers
- IUPAC name: (5Z,8Z,11Z,14Z)- N-(4-Hydroxyphenyl)icosa- 5,8,11,14-tetraenamide
- CAS Number: 183718-77-6
- PubChem CID: 6604822
- ChemSpider: 5037081
- UNII: XVJ94H0U21
- ChEMBL: ChEMBL39878
- CompTox Dashboard (EPA): DTXSID60424985

Chemical and physical data
- Formula: C_{26}H_{37}NO_{2}
- Molar mass: 395.587 g·mol^{−1}
- 3D model (JSmol): Interactive image
- SMILES: O=C(Nc1ccc(O)cc1)CCC\C=C/C\C=C/C\C=C/C\C=C/CCCCC
- InChI: InChI=1S/C26H37NO2/c1-2-3-4-5-6-7-8-9-10-11-12-13-14-15-16-17-18-19-26(29)27-24-20-22-25(28)23-21-24/h6-7,9-10,12-13,15-16,20-23,28H,2-5,8,11,14,17-19H2,1H3,(H,27,29)/b7-6-,10-9-,13-12-,16-15-; Key:IJBZOOZRAXHERC-DOFZRALJSA-N

AM404, also known as N-arachidonoylphenolamine, is an active metabolite of paracetamol (acetaminophen), responsible for all or part of its analgesic action and anticonvulsant effects. Chemically, it is the amide formed from 4-aminophenol and arachidonic acid. AM404 is one of the AM cannabinoids discovered by Alexandros Makriyannis and his team.

== Pharmacokinetics ==
AM404 is found in the brains of animals and cerebrospinal fluid of humans taking paracetamol. It is produced from 4-aminophenol by the action of FAAH.

It is also generated in vitro from 4-aminophenol by peripheral sensory neurons.

== Pharmacodynamics ==
AM404 is a weak agonist of cannabinoid receptors CB_{1} and CB_{2}, an inhibitor of endocannabinoid transporter, a potent activator of TRPV1, and a very potent inhibitor of Na_{v}1.8 and 1.7. It weakly inhibits cyclooxygenases (COX). The endocannbinoid system, TRPV1, and COX are involved in pain and thermoregulatory pathways. Na_{v}1.8 and 1.7 are involved in peripheral pain perception.

=== CB_{1} and CB_{2} ===
AM404 is a weak agonist of cannabinoid receptors CB_{1} and CB_{2}.

=== Endocannabinoid concentration ===
It is established that AM404 increases concentrations of the endogenous cannabinoid anandamide within the synaptic cleft, contributing to its analgesic activity. This has been well characterised as involving endocannabinoid transporter inhibition, but the precise transporter responsible is yet to be determined.

AM404 was originally reported to be an endogenous cannabinoid reuptake inhibitor, preventing the transport of anandamide and other related compounds back from the synaptic cleft, much in the same way that common selective serotonin reuptake inhibitor (SSRI) antidepressants prevent the reuptake of serotonin. Earlier work on the mechanism of AM404 suggested that the inhibition of fatty acid amide hydrolase (FAAH) by AM404 was responsible for all of its attributed reuptake properties, since intracellular FAAH hydrolysis of anandamide changes the intra/extracellular anandamide equilibrium. However, this is not the case, as newer research on FAAH knockout mice has found that brain cells internalize anandamide through a selective transport mechanism which is independent of FAAH activity. It is this mechanism which is inhibited by AM404.

=== TRPV1 ===
AM404 is also a TRPV1 agonist and inhibitor of cyclooxygenase COX-1 and COX-2, thus attenuating prostaglandin synthesis.

The anticonvulsant action of AM404 is mediated through TRPV1, according to Suemaru et al. (2018), rebutting a previous explanation involving CB_{1} receptors.

=== Sodium channels ===
AM404 has also been reported to inhibit voltage-gated sodium channels in the peripheral nervous system, with much greater potency than its effects at previously proposed targets. Specifically, it inhibits Na_{v}1.8 and 1.7 channels at nanomolar concentrations in vitro. AM404 injected into the hind paw of rats increase the pain threshold for the treated paw, but not the untreated paw, confirming the peripheral nature of this effect. It also lowers pain responses in a few other in vivo models when injected directly into the affected area. Other tested metabolites of paracetamol do not block pain-sensing sodium channels in vitro.

== See also ==
- VDM-11 (2-methyl analogue)
