= WOBE437 =

Clinical data
- Other names: WOBE-437
- Drug class: Selective endocannabinoid reuptake inhibitor (SERI)
- ATC code: None

Identifiers
- IUPAC name: (2E,4E)-N-[2-(3,4-dimethoxyphenyl)ethyl]dodeca-2,4-dienamide
- CAS Number: 2108100-73-6
- PubChem CID: 137700154
- ChemSpider: 68003776

Chemical and physical data
- Formula: C_{22}H_{33}NO_{3}
- Molar mass: 359.510 g·mol^{−1}
- 3D model (JSmol): Interactive image
- SMILES: CCCCCCC/C=C/C=C/C(=O)NCCC1=CC(=C(C=C1)OC)OC
- InChI: InChI=1S/C22H33NO3/c1-4-5-6-7-8-9-10-11-12-13-22(24)23-17-16-19-14-15-20(25-2)21(18-19)26-3/h10-15,18H,4-9,16-17H2,1-3H3,(H,23,24)/b11-10+,13-12+; Key:LAHLFCSEHHJQRN-AQASXUMVSA-N

WOBE437 is a selective endocannabinoid reuptake inhibitor (SERI) which has been used in scientific research.

It is a highly potent and selective endocannabinoid reuptake inhibitor, with an IC_{50} of 10 nM in terms of this action. The drug produces anxiolytic-like, anti-inflammatory, analgesic, antiallodynic, and muscle relaxant effects in rodents. These effects are mediated by increased endocannabinoid levels, including of anandamide (AEA) and 2-arachidonylglycerol (2-AG), and are dependent on cannabinoid receptors, for instance the cannabinoid CB_{1} receptor. Conversely, WOBE437 did not produce catalepsy, affect locomotor activity, or produce the typical sedation of cannabinoid CB_{1} receptor agonists. The drug also showed effectiveness in an animal model of multiple sclerosis. Originally believed to be selective, off-target activities of WOBE437 have subsequently been identified and described.

WOBE437 is orally bioavailable in rodents.

Numerous analogues of WOBE437 have been explored in search of candidates with better drug-like properties, though a series of almost 80 compounds found none that were more potent than WOBE437 itself.

WOBE437 was first described in the scientific literature by 2013.

== See also ==
- Endocannabinoid reuptake inhibitor
- SYT-510
