= SYT-510 =

Endocannabinoid reuptake inhibitor under development for psychiatric disorders

Clinical data
- Other names: SYT510
- Routes of administration: Oral
- Drug class: Selective endocannabinoid reuptake inhibitor (SERI)

SYT-510 is a selective endocannabinoid reuptake inhibitor (SERI) which is under development for the treatment of psychiatric disorders, anxiety disorders, mood disorders, and traumatic stress disorders. It is currently being developed by a pharmaceutical company called Synendos Therapeutics.

SERIs have been shown to both mildly and selectively increase levels of endocannabinoids such as anandamide (AEA) and 2-arachidonoyl glycerol (2-AG) via inhibition of a newly identified biological target. In September 2025, Synendos reported the successful completion of Phase 1 clinical trials in healthy volunteers, paving the way for the start of Phase 2a clinical study in Generalized Anxiety Disorder (GAD).

== See also ==
- Endocannabinoid reuptake inhibitor
- WOBE437
