= VDM-11 =

Names
- Preferred IUPAC name (5Z,8Z,11Z,14Z)-N-(4-Hydroxy-2-methylphenyl)icosa-5,8,11,14-tetraenamide
- Other names N-(4-Hydroxy-2-methylphenyl)arachidonylamide

Identifiers
CAS Number	313998-81-1
3D model (JSmol)	Interactive image
ChemSpider	8063420
ECHA InfoCard	100.159.410
PubChem CID	9887748
UNII	SQF3UL3Q4C
CompTox Dashboard (EPA)	DTXSID60694025
- InChI: InChI=1S/C27H39NO2/c1-3-4-5-6-7-8-9-10-11-12-13-14-15-16-17-18-19-20-27(30)28-26-22-21-25(29)23-24(26)2/h7-8,10-11,13-14,16-17,21-23,29H,3-6,9,12,15,18-20H2,1-2H3,(H,28,30)/b8-7-,11-10-,14-13-,17-16- Key: WUZWFRWVRHLXHZ-ZKWNWVNESA-N; InChI=1/C27H39NO2/c1-3-4-5-6-7-8-9-10-11-12-13-14-15-16-17-18-19-20-27(30)28-26-22-21-25(29)23-24(26)2/h7-8,10-11,13-14,16-17,21-23,29H,3-6,9,12,15,18-20H2,1-2H3,(H,28,30)/b8-7-,11-10-,14-13-,17-16- Key: WUZWFRWVRHLXHZ-ZKWNWVNEBM
- SMILES: O=C(Nc1c(cc(O)cc1)C)CCC\C=C/C\C=C/C\C=C/C\C=C/CCCCC

Properties
Chemical formula	C_{27}H_{39}NO_{2}
Molar mass	409.614 g·mol^{−1}
Appearance	Gold colored oil
- Except where otherwise noted, data are given for materials in their standard state (at 25 °C [77 °F], 100 kPa). verify (what is ?) Infobox references

VDM-11 is a potent cannabinoid reuptake inhibitor. This is achieved by inhibiting the anandamide membrane transporter (AMT) which is responsible for reuptake of anandamide.

It is light-sensitive and must be stored within an inert gas such as argon, in a dark place and at an ideal temperature of -20 °C or lower. This tan-colored substance is rarely found outside of research laboratories.

VDM-11 is a weak CB1 agonist with a binding affinity of Ki > 5–10 μM.

== See also ==
- AM-404
