= Caleb British International School =

Private school in Lekki, Nigeria

Coordinates: 6.46017°N 3.66995°E

Caleb British International School (CBIS) is a co-educational Day/Boarding school in Abijo G.R.A Lekki, Lagos State, Nigeria. The school is an arm of Caleb Group of Schools, which has been in existence for over 30 years. CBIS, initially known as Caleb British Academy, offered a level programs to students looking to further their education abroad.

Caleb British International School offers Pre-School, Primary and Secondary Schools. It offers a rich British/Nigerian Curriculum. The school was founded by Prince Ola Adebogun. CBIS emphasises strong moral and Christian values.

Young Entrepreneurs' Club of Caleb British International School earned a $2,500 Ciena Solution Sustainability Award for their STEM Farm Project. American company Digital Promise organized the Award.
