= Guineesine =

Compound isolated from long pepper and black pepper

- Chemical structure of guineesine

Clinical data
- Other names: Guineensine; UNII-7DK8DMU9JX

Identifiers
- IUPAC name: (2E,4E,12E)-13-(1,3-benzodioxol-5-yl)-N-(2-methylpropyl)trideca-2,4,12-trienamide
- CAS Number: 55038-30-7
- PubChem CID: 6442405
- ChemSpider: 4946489
- UNII: 7DK8DMU9JX
- ChEBI: CHEBI:181825
- ChEMBL: ChEMBL404184
- CompTox Dashboard (EPA): DTXSID801336042

Chemical and physical data
- Formula: C_{24}H_{33}NO_{3}
- Molar mass: 383.532 g·mol^{−1}
- 3D model (JSmol): Interactive image
- SMILES: CC(C)CNC(=O)/C=C/C=C/CCCCCC/C=C/C1=CC2=C(C=C1)OCO2
- InChI: InChI=1S/C24H33NO3/c1-20(2)18-25-24(26)14-12-10-8-6-4-3-5-7-9-11-13-21-15-16-22-23(17-21)28-19-27-22/h8,10-17,20H,3-7,9,18-19H2,1-2H3,(H,25,26)/b10-8+,13-11+,14-12+; Key:FPMPOFBEYSSYDQ-AUVZEZIHSA-N

Guineesine (or guineensine) is a compound isolated from long pepper (Piper longum) and black pepper (Piper nigrum).

It was first isolated, studied and named from Piper guineense.

== Research ==
Guineensine inhibits the cellular reuptake of anandamide and 2-arachidonoylglycerol in a mouse model (EC_{50} = 290 nM). This causes an increase in the activity of the two neurotransmitters which are classified as endogenous cannabinoids.

Guineesine can dose-dependently produce cannabimimetic effects in a mouse model which are indicated by potent catatonic, analgesic, hypo-locomotive and hypo-thermic effects. In addition, the analgesic and catatonic effects were reversed by the cannabinoid receptor type 1 (CB_{1}) inverse agonist rimonabant.

Guineesine is also a monoamine oxidase inhibitor (MAOI) in vitro (IC_{50} = 139.2 μM).
