= CBL =

CBL may refer to:

== CBC Radio ==
- CBL-FM, a CBC Radio Two radio station in Toronto, Ontario
- CBLA-FM in Toronto had the call sign CBL for much of the period when it was on the AM band (1937–99)

== Sports leagues and associations ==
- Canadian Baseball League (2003) (defunct)
- Canadian Baseball League
- Canadian Basketball League
- Celebrity Badminton League, an India-based badminton league for celebrities
- China Baseball League, the pre-eminent men's baseball league in China
- Chinese Basketball League, former name of the National Basketball League, a men's semi-professional basketball minor league in China
- Citrus Belt League, a division II high school sports league in Southern California.
- Conference Basketball League, a former men's basketball minor league in New Zealand
- Continental Baseball League
- Continental Basketball League, a men's professional basketball minor league in the United States

== Institutions ==
- Carl Barks Library
- Catholic Benevolent Legion
- Central Bank of Liberia
- Central Bank of Libya
- Chesapeake Biological Laboratory
- Chester Beatty Library
- Conemaugh and Black Lick Railroad, a defunct railroad in Pennsylvania

== Science and engineering ==
- Cannabicyclol, a cannabinoid found in cannabis
- CBL (gene) found in mammals
- Calculator-Based Laboratory, a data-collection and logging system by Texas Instruments
- Common Based Linux
- CBL-Mariner, a free and open source cloud infrastructure operating system based on Linux and developed by Microsoft
- Composite Blocking List
- Computer-based learning
- CBL / Computer Bureau Limited, parent company of Datacom Group
- Convective Boundary Layer, the part of the atmosphere most directly affected by solar heating of the Earth's surface
- Croatian Biographical Lexicon

== Other uses ==
- CBL & Associates Properties
  - CBL, the ticker symbol for CBL & Associates Properties
- Cambuslang railway station, a UK railway station
- Carbon Based Lifeforms, a Swedish electronic music duo
- Cement bond log
- Cerebellum
- Challenge-based learning
- Choice-based lettings (see Public Housing#United Kingdom)
- Clare Boothe Luce
- Confidence-based learning
- Controlled buoyant lift, an underwater diver-rescue technique used in recreational scuba diving
- Cross-body lead, a dance move
- Cross-border leasing
