= Paracetamol =

Medication for pain and fever

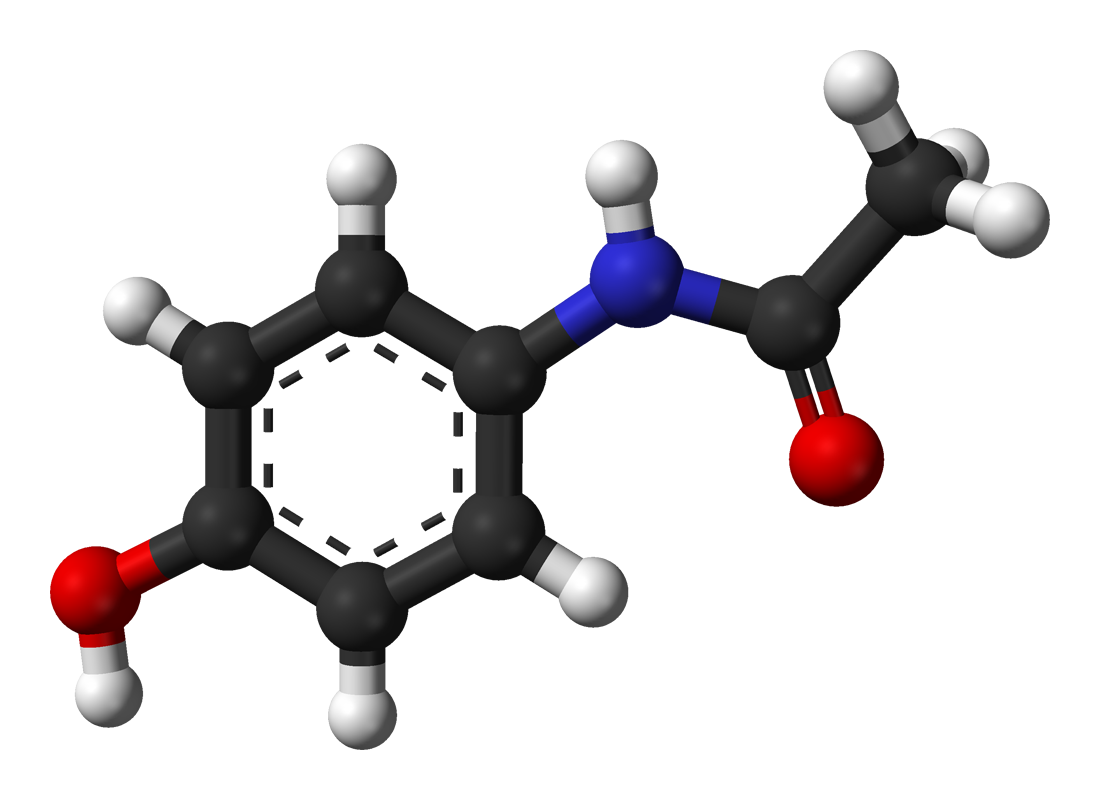

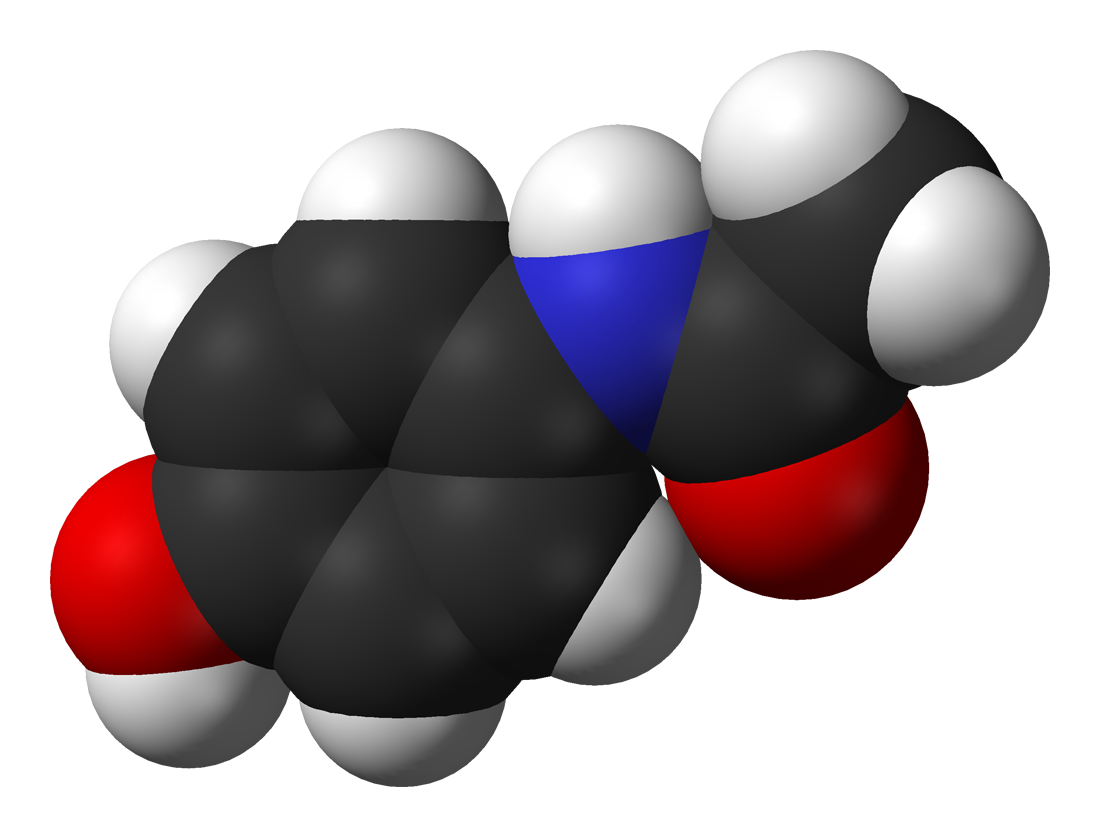

Clinical data
- Pronunciation: Paracetamol: /ˌpærəˈsiːtəmɒl/ also, /ˌpærəˈsɛtəmɒl/ Acetaminophen: /əˌsiːtəˈmɪnəfɪn/
- Trade names: Tylenol, Panadol, others
- Other names: N-acetyl-para-aminophenol (APAP), acetaminophen (USAN US)
- AHFS/Drugs.com: Monograph
- MedlinePlus: a681004
- License data: US DailyMed: Acetaminophen
- Pregnancy category: AU: A
- Routes of administration: By mouth, intravenous, rectal
- Drug class: Analgesic; antipyretic
- ATC code: N02BE01 (WHO) N02BE51 (WHO) N02BE71 (WHO)

Legal status
- Legal status: AU: S4 (Prescription only) OTC, and unscheduled; CA: OTC / Rx-only; UK: General sales list (GSL, OTC); US: OTC / Rx-only; CN: OTC

Pharmacokinetic data
- Bioavailability: 63–89%
- Protein binding: negligible to 10–25% in overdose
- Metabolism: Predominantly in the liver
- Metabolites: APAP gluc, APAP sulfate, APAP GSH, APAP cys, AM404, NAPQI
- Onset of action: Oral: 37 minutes Intravenous: 8 minutes
- Elimination half-life: 1.9–2.5 hours
- Excretion: Kidney

Identifiers
- IUPAC name: N-(4-hydroxyphenyl)acetamide
- CAS Number: 103-90-2
- PubChem CID: 1983; 103-90-2
- IUPHAR/BPS: 5239
- DrugBank: DB00316
- ChemSpider: 1906; 1906
- UNII: 362O9ITL9D
- KEGG: D00217
- ChEBI: CHEBI:46195
- ChEMBL: ChEMBL112
- PDB ligand: TYL (PDBe, RCSB PDB)
- CompTox Dashboard (EPA): DTXSID2020006
- ECHA InfoCard: 100.002.870

Chemical and physical data
- Formula: C_{8}H_{9}NO_{2}
- Molar mass: 151.165 g·mol^{−1}
- 3D model (JSmol): Interactive image
- Density: 1.293 g/cm^{3}
- Melting point: 169 °C (336 °F)
- Boiling point: 500 °C (932 °F) or higher
- Solubility in water: 7.21 g/kg (0 °C); 8.21 g/kg (5 °C); 9.44 g/kg (10 °C); 10.97 g/kg (15 °C); 12.78 g/kg (20 °C); ~14 mg/ml (20 °C)
- SMILES: CC(=O)Nc1ccc(O)cc1
- InChI: InChI=1S/C8H9NO2/c1-6(10)9-7-2-4-8(11)5-3-7/h2-5,11H,1H3,(H,9,10); Key:RZVAJINKPMORJF-UHFFFAOYSA-N

Paracetamol, (Note: Used by the World Health Organization (WHO), UK pronunciation /ˌpærəˈsiːtəmɒl/ PA-rə-SEE-tə-mol also, /ˌpærəˈsɛtəmɒl/PA-rə-SE-tə-mol) or acetaminophen, (Note: Commonly called "acetaminophen" in the United States, Canada, Japan, South Korea, Colombia and Venezuela) is an analgesic and antipyretic agent used to treat fever and mild to moderate pain. It is a widely available over-the-counter drug sold generically or under various brand names, including Tylenol and Panadol.

Paracetamol relieves pain in acute mild migraine and episodic tension headaches. At a standard dose, paracetamol slightly reduces fever, though it is inferior to ibuprofen in that respect: the benefits of its use for fever are unclear, particularly in the context of fever of viral origins. Paracetamol is effective for pain after wisdom tooth extraction, but it is less effective than ibuprofen. The combination of paracetamol and ibuprofen provides greater analgesic efficacy than either drug alone. The pain relief paracetamol provides in osteoarthritis is small and clinically insignificant. Evidence supporting its use in low back pain, cancer pain, and neuropathic pain is insufficient. Paracetamol is the first-line treatment for pain and fever in pregnancy; no causal association with neurodevelopmental disorders has been established, while untreated pain and fever can harm the mother and fetus.

At a recommended maximum daily dose for an adult of three to four grams, paracetamol is safe and effective in the short term when used as directed, with uncommon adverse effects similar to those of ibuprofen. It is often used in patients who cannot tolerate nonsteroidal anti-inflammatory drugs (NSAIDs) such as ibuprofen. Chronic consumption of paracetamol is in many cases not of benefit, and may result in abnormal liver function tests, and higher doses may lead to toxicity, including liver failure. Paracetamol poisoning is one of the leading causes of poisoning in high-income countries, and the foremost cause of acute liver failure in many countries.

Paracetamol was first made in 1878 by Harmon Northrop Morse or possibly in 1852 by Charles Frédéric Gerhardt. It is the most commonly used medication for pain and fever in both the United States and Europe. It is on the World Health Organization's List of Essential Medicines. Paracetamol is available as a generic medication, with brand names including Tylenol and Panadol, among others. In 2023, it was the 112th most commonly prescribed medication in the United States, with more than 5 million prescriptions.

== Medical uses ==
=== Fever ===
Paracetamol is used for reducing fever. However, there has been a lack of research on its antipyretic properties, particularly in adults, and thus its benefits are unclear. As a result, it has been described as over-prescribed for this application. In addition, low-quality clinical data indicates that when used for the common cold, paracetamol may relieve a stuffed or runny nose, but not other cold symptoms such as sore throat, malaise, sneezing, or cough.

For people in critical care, paracetamol decreases body temperature by only 0.2–0.3 °C more than control interventions and does not affect their mortality: It does not change the outcome in febrile patients with stroke. The results are contradictory for paracetamol use in sepsis: higher mortality, lower mortality, and no change in mortality were all reported. Paracetamol offered no benefit in the treatment of dengue fever and was accompanied by a higher rate of liver enzyme elevation, a sign of potential liver damage. Overall, there is no support for a routine administration of antipyretic drugs, including paracetamol, to hospitalized patients with fever and infection.

The efficacy of paracetamol in children with fever is unclear. Paracetamol should not be used solely to reduce body temperature; however, it may be considered for children with fever who appear distressed. It does not prevent febrile seizures. It appears that a 0.2 °C decrease of the body temperature in children after a standard dose of paracetamol is of questionable value, particularly in emergencies. Based on this, some physicians advocate using higher doses that may decrease the temperature by as much as 0.7 °C. Meta-analyses showed that paracetamol is less effective than ibuprofen in children (marginally less effective, according to another analysis), including children younger than 2 years old, with equivalent safety. Exacerbation of asthma occurs with similar frequency for both medications.

=== Pain ===
Paracetamol is used for the relief of mild to moderate pain such as in headaches, muscle aches, minor arthritis pain, and toothaches, as well as pain caused by cold, flu, sprains, and dysmenorrhea. It is recommended, in particular, for acute mild to moderate pain; evidence for its treatment of chronic pain is insufficient.

==== Musculoskeletal pain ====
The benefits of paracetamol in musculoskeletal conditions, such as osteoarthritis and backaches, are uncertain.

It appears to provide only small and not clinically important benefits in osteoarthritis. The guidelines of the American College of Rheumatology and Arthritis Foundation for the management of osteoarthritis note that the effect size in clinical trials of paracetamol has been very small, suggesting that for most individuals it is ineffective. The guideline conditionally recommends short-term and episodic use of paracetamol to those who do not tolerate nonsteroidal anti-inflammatory drugs. For people taking it regularly, monitoring for liver toxicity is required. The same recommendation was issued by the European League Against Rheumatism for hand osteoarthritis. Similarly, the ESCEO algorithm for the treatment of knee osteoarthritis recommends limiting the use of paracetamol to short-term rescue analgesia only.

Paracetamol is ineffective for acute low back pain. No randomized clinical trials evaluated its use for chronic or radicular back pain, and the evidence in favor of paracetamol is lacking.

==== Headaches ====
Paracetamol is effective for acute migraine: 39% of people experience pain relief within one hour compared with 20% in the control group. The aspirin/paracetamol/caffeine combination also "has strong evidence of effectiveness and can be used as a first-line treatment for migraine". Paracetamol on its own only slightly alleviates episodic tension headache in those who have them frequently. However, the aspirin/paracetamol/caffeine combination is superior to both paracetamol alone and placebo and offers meaningful relief of tension headache: two hours after administering the medication, 29% of those who took the combination were pain-free as compared with 21% on paracetamol and 18% on placebo. The German, Austrian, and Swiss headache societies and the German Society of Neurology recommend this combination as a "highlighted" one for self-medication of tension headache, with paracetamol/caffeine combination being a "remedy of first choice", and paracetamol a "remedy of second choice".

==== Dental and other post-surgical pain ====
Pain after a dental surgery provides a reliable model for the action of analgesics on other kinds of acute pain. For the relief of such pain, paracetamol is inferior to ibuprofen. Full therapeutic doses of nonsteroidal anti-inflammatory drugs (NSAIDs) ibuprofen, naproxen, or diclofenac are clearly more efficacious than the paracetamol/codeine combination which is frequently prescribed for dental pain. The combinations of paracetamol and NSAIDs ibuprofen or diclofenac are promising, possibly offering better pain control than either paracetamol or the NSAID alone. Additionally, the paracetamol/ibuprofen combination may be superior to paracetamol/codeine and ibuprofen/codeine combinations.

A meta-analysis of general post-surgical pain, which included dental and other surgery, showed the paracetamol/codeine combination to be more effective than paracetamol alone: it provided significant pain relief to as much as 53% of the participants, while the placebo helped only 7%.

==== Other pain ====
Paracetamol fails to relieve procedural pain in newborn babies. For perineal pain postpartum paracetamol appears to be less effective than nonsteroidal anti-inflammatory drugs (NSAIDs).

The studies to support or refute the use of paracetamol for cancer pain and neuropathic pain are lacking. There is limited evidence in favor of the use of the intravenous form of paracetamol for acute pain control in the emergency department. The combination of paracetamol with caffeine is superior to paracetamol alone for the treatment of acute pain.

=== Patent ductus arteriosus ===
Paracetamol helps ductal closure in patent ductus arteriosus. It is as effective for this purpose as ibuprofen or indomethacin, but results in less frequent gastrointestinal bleeding than ibuprofen. Its use for extremely low birth weight and gestational age infants, however, requires further study.

== Use in pregnancy and breastfeeding ==
=== Pregnancy ===
Paracetamol has long been established as a safe medication to treat short-term fever and significant pain in pregnant patients. Regulatory agencies, including the European Medicines Agency (EMA), the Medicines and Healthcare products Regulatory Agency (MHRA), the World Health Organization (WHO), and the U.S. Food and Drug Administration (FDA) recommend paracetamol as a first-line analgesic and antipyretic in pregnancy, with use limited to situations where necessary, at the lowest effective dose, and for the shortest duration.

Some observational studies have suggested a possible association between prenatal paracetamol use and neurodevelopmental disorders, including ADHD and autism. However, these studies are limited by confounding factors such as maternal fever and infection, and do not demonstrate causation. Large, well-controlled studies, including sibling-controlled analyses, find no causal link after adjusting for maternal conditions. In support of existing recommendations for its safe use during pregnancy, a 2026 review found that there were no clinically significant increases in the occurrence of autism, attention deficit hyperactivity disorder, or intellectual disability in the children of pregnant women who used paracetamol as directed. Untreated pain and fever can harm mother and fetus.

=== Breastfeeding ===
Paracetamol is excreted in breast milk at measurable concentrations (milk/plasma ratio approximately 1), but the amount ingested by the infant is much lower than paediatric therapeutic doses and rarely associated with clinical effects. Use during breastfeeding is considered compatible at recommended doses, with extra caution for preterm infants or infants with liver disease.

== Adverse effects ==
Gastrointestinal adverse effects such as nausea and abdominal pain are extremely uncommon, and their frequency is substantially lower than with ibuprofen use. Increase in risk-taking behavior is possible. According to the U.S. Food and Drug Administration (FDA), the drug may cause rare and possibly fatal skin reactions such as Stevens–Johnson syndrome and toxic epidermal necrolysis, Rechallenge tests and an analysis of American but not French pharmacovigilance databases indicated a risk of these reactions.

In clinical trials for osteoarthritis, the number of participants reporting adverse effects was similar for those on paracetamol and on placebo. However, the abnormal liver function tests (meaning there was some inflammation or damage to the liver) were almost four times more likely in those on paracetamol, although the clinical importance of this effect is uncertain. After 13 weeks of paracetamol therapy for knee pain, a drop in hemoglobin level indicating gastrointestinal bleeding was observed in 20% of participants, this rate being similar to the ibuprofen group.

Due to the absence of controlled studies, most of the information about the long-term safety of paracetamol comes from observational studies. These indicate a consistent pattern of increased mortality as well as cardiovascular (stroke, myocardial infarction), gastrointestinal (ulcers, bleeding) and renal adverse effects with increased dose of paracetamol. Use of paracetamol is associated with 1.9 times higher risk of peptic ulcer. Those who take it regularly at a higher dose (more than 2–3 g daily) are at much higher risk (3.6–3.7 times) of gastrointestinal bleeding and other bleeding events. Meta-analyses suggest that paracetamol may increase the risk of kidney impairment by 23% and kidney cancer by 28%. Paracetamol slightly but significantly increases blood pressure and heart rate. A review of available research has suggested that an increase in systolic blood pressure and increased risk of gastrointestinal bleeding associated with chronic paracetamol use shows a degree of dose dependence.

The association between paracetamol use and asthma in children has been a matter of controversy. However, the most recent research suggests that there is no association, and that the frequency of asthma exacerbations in children after paracetamol is the same as after another frequently used pain killer, ibuprofen.

In recommended doses, the side effects of paracetamol are mild to non-existent. In contrast to aspirin, it is not a blood thinner (and thus may be used in patients where bleeding is a concern), and it does not cause gastric irritation. Compared to Ibuprofen—which can have adverse effects that include diarrhea, vomiting, and abdominal pain—paracetamol is well tolerated with fewer side effects. Prolonged daily use may cause kidney or liver damage. Paracetamol is metabolized by the liver and is hepatotoxic; side effects may be more likely in chronic alcoholics or patients with liver damage.

=== Adverse effects specific to intravenous paracetamol ===
Intravenous paracetamol has consistently been shown to have hemodynamic effects, reducing systolic, diastolic, and mean arterial blood pressure. In a minority of cases, this side effect has been associated with cardiac arrest. Hypotension is hypothesized to occur due to the addition of mannitol in intravenous formulations of paracetamol, which is done to enhance solubility. Other side effects specific to IV paracetamol include pain at injection site.

== Overdose ==
Overdose of paracetamol is caused by taking more than the recommended maximum daily dose of paracetamol for healthy adults (three or four grams), and can cause potentially fatal liver damage. A single dose should not exceed 1000 mg, doses should be taken no sooner than four hours apart, and no more than four doses (4000 mg) in 24 hours. While a majority of adult overdoses are linked to suicide attempts, many cases are accidental, often due to the use of more than one paracetamol-containing product over an extended period.

Paracetamol is hepatotoxic and depletes the stock of the antioxidant glutathione in the liver as glutathione is consumed much faster than it can be replenished.

Paracetamol toxicity is one of the leading causes of poisoning in high-income countries, and the foremost cause of acute liver failure in many countries.

Overdoses are frequently related to high-dose recreational use of prescription opioids, as these opioids are most often combined with paracetamol. The overdose risk may be heightened by frequent consumption of alcohol.

Untreated paracetamol overdose results in a lengthy, painful illness. Signs and symptoms of paracetamol toxicity may initially be absent or non-specific symptoms. The first symptoms of overdose usually begin several hours after ingestion, with nausea, vomiting, sweating, and pain as acute liver failure starts. People who take overdoses of paracetamol do not fall asleep or lose consciousness, although most people who attempt suicide with paracetamol wrongly believe that they will be rendered unconscious by the drug.

Treatment is aimed at removing the paracetamol from the body and replenishing glutathione. Activated charcoal can be used to decrease absorption of paracetamol if the person comes to the hospital soon after the overdose. While the antidote, acetylcysteine (also called N-acetylcysteine or NAC), acts as a precursor for glutathione, helping the body regenerate enough to prevent or at least decrease the possible damage to the liver, a liver transplant is often required if damage to the liver becomes severe.

NAC is usually given following a treatment nomogram for patients with an acute overdose at a known time of ingestion. Patients with unknown time of ingestion, unreliable history, or repeat supratherapeutic ingestion are treated based on risk assessment. Toxicity of paracetamol is due to its quinone metabolite NAPQI and NAC also helps in neutralizing it. Kidney failure is also a possible side effect.

== Interactions ==
Prokinetic agents such as metoclopramide accelerate gastric emptying, shorten time (t_{max}) to paracetamol peak blood plasma concentration (C_{max}), and increase C_{max}. Medications slowing gastric emptying such as propantheline and morphine lengthen t_{max} and decrease C_{max}. The interaction with morphine may result in patients failing to achieve the therapeutic concentration of paracetamol; the clinical significance of interactions with metoclopramide and propantheline is unclear.

There have been suspicions that cytochrome inducers may enhance the toxic pathway of paracetamol metabolism to NAPQI (see Paracetamol#Pharmacokinetics). By and large, these suspicions have not been confirmed. Out of the inducers studied, the evidence of potentially increased liver toxicity in paracetamol overdose exists for phenobarbital, primidone, isoniazid, and possibly St John's wort. On the other hand, the anti-tuberculosis drug isoniazid cuts the formation of NAPQI by 70%.

Ranitidine increased paracetamol area under the curve (AUC) 1.6-fold. AUC increases are also observed with nizatidine and cisapride. The effect is explained by these drugs inhibiting glucuronidation of paracetamol.

Paracetamol raises plasma concentrations of ethinylestradiol by 22% by inhibiting its sulfation. Paracetamol increases INR during warfarin therapy and should be limited to no more than 2 g per week.

== Pharmacology ==
=== Pharmacodynamics ===
Paracetamol appears to exert its effects through two mechanisms: the inhibition of cyclooxygenase (COX) and actions of its metabolite N-arachidonoylphenolamine (AM404).

Supporting the first mechanism, pharmacologically and in its side effects, paracetamol is close to classical nonsteroidal anti-inflammatory drugs (NSAIDs) that act by inhibiting COX-1 and COX-2 enzymes and especially similar to selective COX-2 inhibitors, Paracetamol inhibits prostaglandin synthesis by reducing the active form of COX-1 and COX-2 enzymes. This occurs only when the concentration of arachidonic acid and peroxides is low; under these conditions, COX-2 is the predominant form of cyclooxygenase, which explains the apparent COX-2 selectivity of paracetamol. Under typical inflammation conditions, the concentration of peroxides is high, which counteracts the reducing anti-inflammatory effect of paracetamol, rendering it negligible; in situations where peroxide levels are low, such as for COX-2 in the CNS, this inhibition and its resulting anti-inflammatory effect remain high.

The second mechanism centers on the paracetamol metabolite AM404. This metabolite has been detected in the brains of animals and cerebrospinal fluid of humans taking paracetamol. It is formed in the brain from another paracetamol metabolite 4-aminophenol by action of fatty acid amide hydrolase. AM404 is a weak agonist of cannabinoid receptors CB1 and CB2, an inhibitor of endocannabinoid transporter, and a potent activator of TRPV1 receptor. This and other research indicate that the endocannabinoid system and TRPV1 may play an important role in the analgesic effect of paracetamol.

In 2018, Suemaru et al. found that, in mice, paracetamol exerts an anticonvulsant effect by activation of the TRPV1 receptors and a decrease in neuronal excitability by hyperpolarization of neurons. The exact mechanism of the anticonvulsant effect of paracetamol is not clear. According to Suemaru et al., acetaminophen and its active metabolite AM404 show a dose-dependent anticonvulsant activity against pentylenetetrazol-induced seizures in mice.

In 2025, Maatuf et al. reported that AM404 is also produced by peripheral sensory neurons in vitro and blocks the action of pain-sensing Na_{v}1.8 and 1.7 channels at nanomolar concentrations. AM404 injected into the hind paw of rats increases the pain threshold for the treated paw, but not the untreated paw, confirming the peripheral nature of this effect. It also lowers pain responses in a few other in vivo models when injected directly into the affected area. Other tested metabolites of paracetamol do not block pain-sensing sodium channels in vitro.

=== Pharmacokinetics ===
After being taken by mouth, paracetamol is rapidly absorbed from the small intestine, while absorption from the stomach is negligible. Thus, the rate of absorption depends on stomach emptying. Food slows the stomach's emptying and absorption, but the total amount absorbed stays the same. In the same subjects, the time to reach peak plasma concentration of paracetamol was 20 minutes in a fasting state, compared to 90 minutes in a fed state. Furthermore, a high-carbohydrate meal reduced the peak plasma concentration by approximately fourfold, an effect not observed with high-protein or high-fat meals.

Paracetamol's bioavailability is dose-dependent: it increases from 63% for 500 mg dose to 89% for 1000 mg dose. Its plasma terminal elimination half-life is 1.9–2.5 hours, and volume of distribution is roughly 50 L. Protein binding is negligible, except under the conditions of overdose, when it may reach 15–21%. The concentration in serum after a typical dose of paracetamol usually peaks below 30 μg/mL (200 μmol/L). After 4 hours, the concentration is usually less than 10 μg/mL (66 μmol/L).

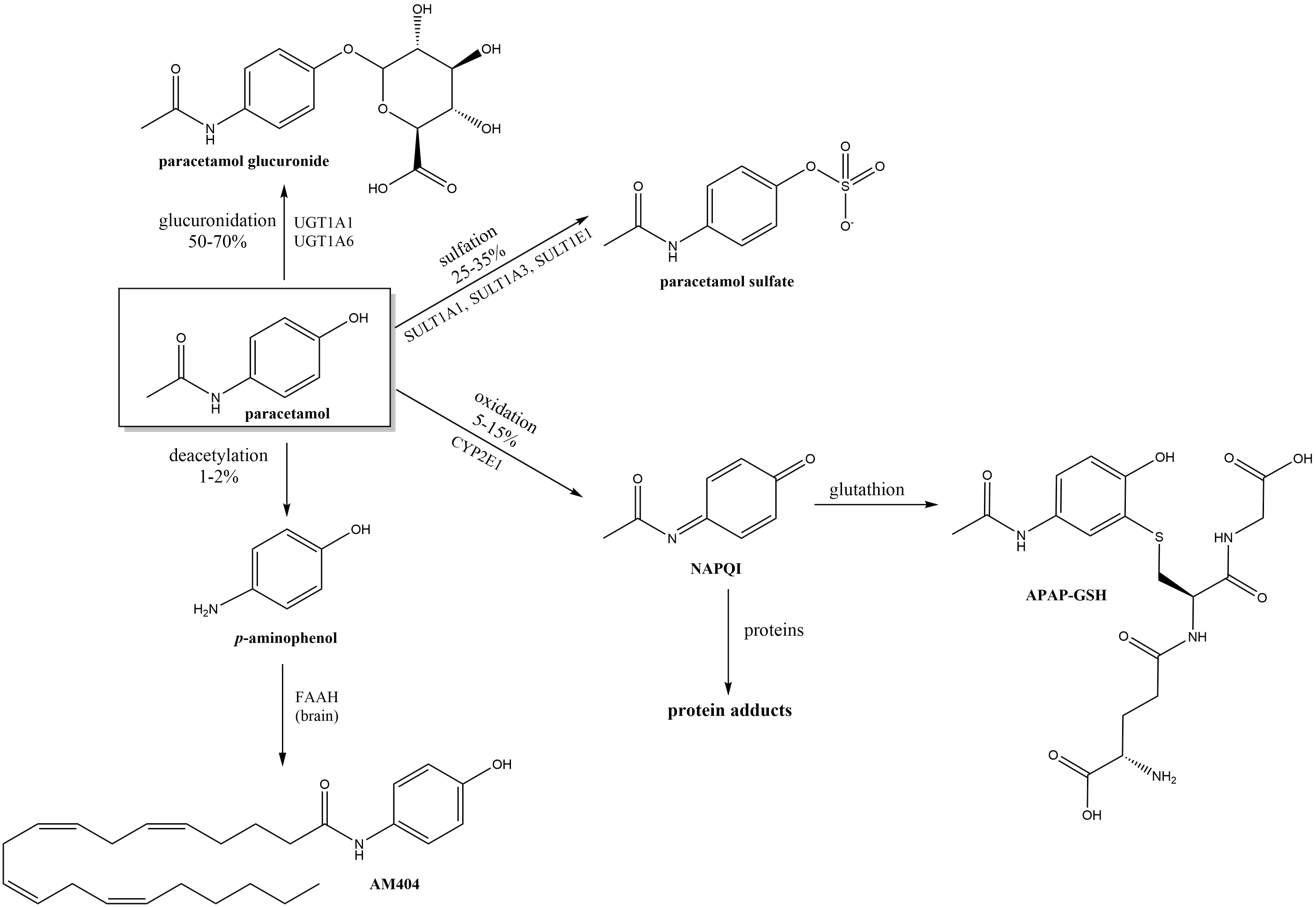
Important pathways of paracetamol metabolism

Paracetamol is metabolized primarily in the liver, mainly by glucuronidation and sulfation, and the products are then eliminated in the urine (see the Scheme on the right). Only 2–5% of the drug is excreted unchanged in the urine. Glucuronidation by UGT1A1 and UGT1A6 accounts for 50–70% of the drug metabolism. Additional 25–35% of paracetamol is converted to sulfate by sulfation enzymes SULT1A1, SULT1A3, and SULT1E1.

A minor metabolic pathway (5–15%) of oxidation by cytochrome P450 enzymes, mainly by CYP2E1, forms a toxic metabolite known as NAPQI (N-acetyl-p-benzoquinone imine). NAPQI is responsible for the liver toxicity of paracetamol. At usual doses of paracetamol, NAPQI is quickly detoxified by conjugation with glutathione. The non-toxic conjugate APAP-GSH is taken up in the bile and further degraded to mercapturic and cysteine conjugates that are excreted in the urine. In overdose, glutathione is depleted by a large amount of formed NAPQI, and NAPQI binds to mitochondria proteins of the liver cells, causing oxidative stress and toxicity.

Yet another minor but important direction of metabolism is deacetylation of 1–2% of paracetamol to form p-aminophenol. p-Aminophenol is then converted in the brain by fatty acid amide hydrolase into AM404, a compound that may be partially responsible for the analgesic action of paracetamol.

== Chemistry ==
=== Synthesis ===
==== Classical methods ====
The classical methods for the production of paracetamol involve the acetylation of 4-aminophenol with acetic anhydride as the last step. They differ in how 4-aminophenol is prepared. In one method, nitration of phenol with nitric acid affords 4-nitrophenol, which is reduced to 4-aminophenol by hydrogenation over Raney nickel. In another method, nitrobenzene is reduced electrolytically giving 4-aminophenol directly. Additionally, 4-nitrophenol can be selectively reduced by Tin(II) Chloride in absolute ethanol or ethyl acetate to produce a 91% yield of 4-aminophenol.

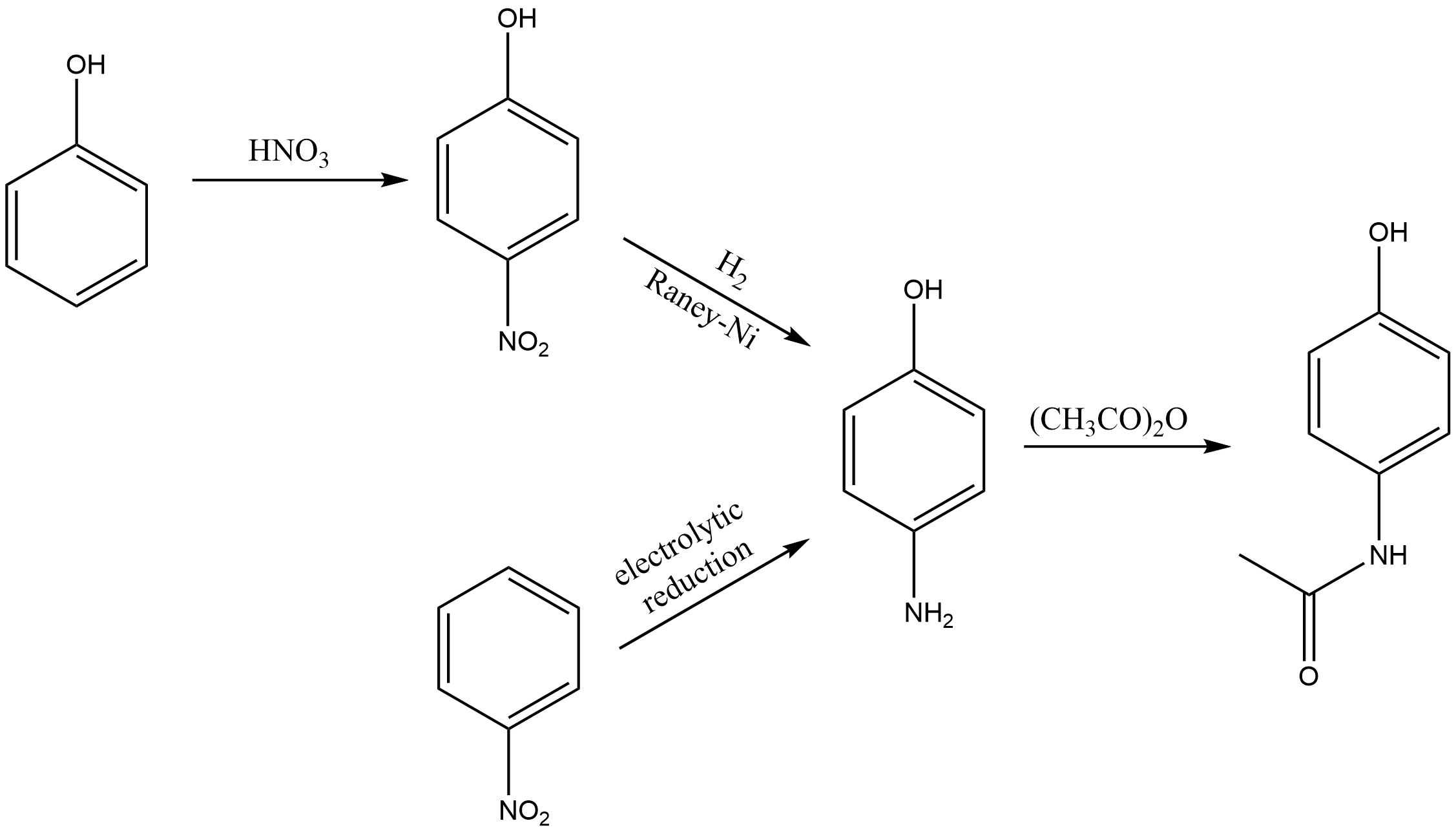
Classical methods for the production of paracetamol

==== Celanese synthesis ====
An alternative industrial synthesis developed at Celanese involves firstly direct acylation of phenol with acetic anhydride in the presence of hydrogen fluoride to give a methyl ketone, then the conversion of the ketone with hydroxylamine to a ketoxime, and finally the acid-catalysed Beckmann rearrangement of the oxime to the amide in the para-acetylaminophenol product.

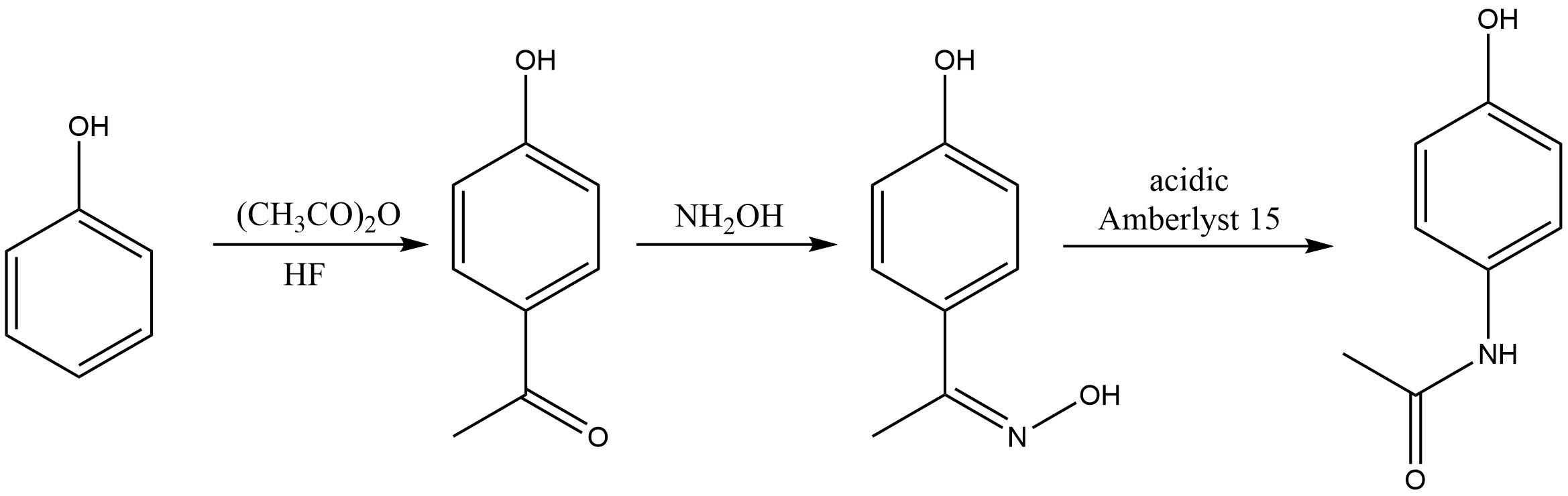
Celanese method for the preparation of paracetamol

=== Reactions ===
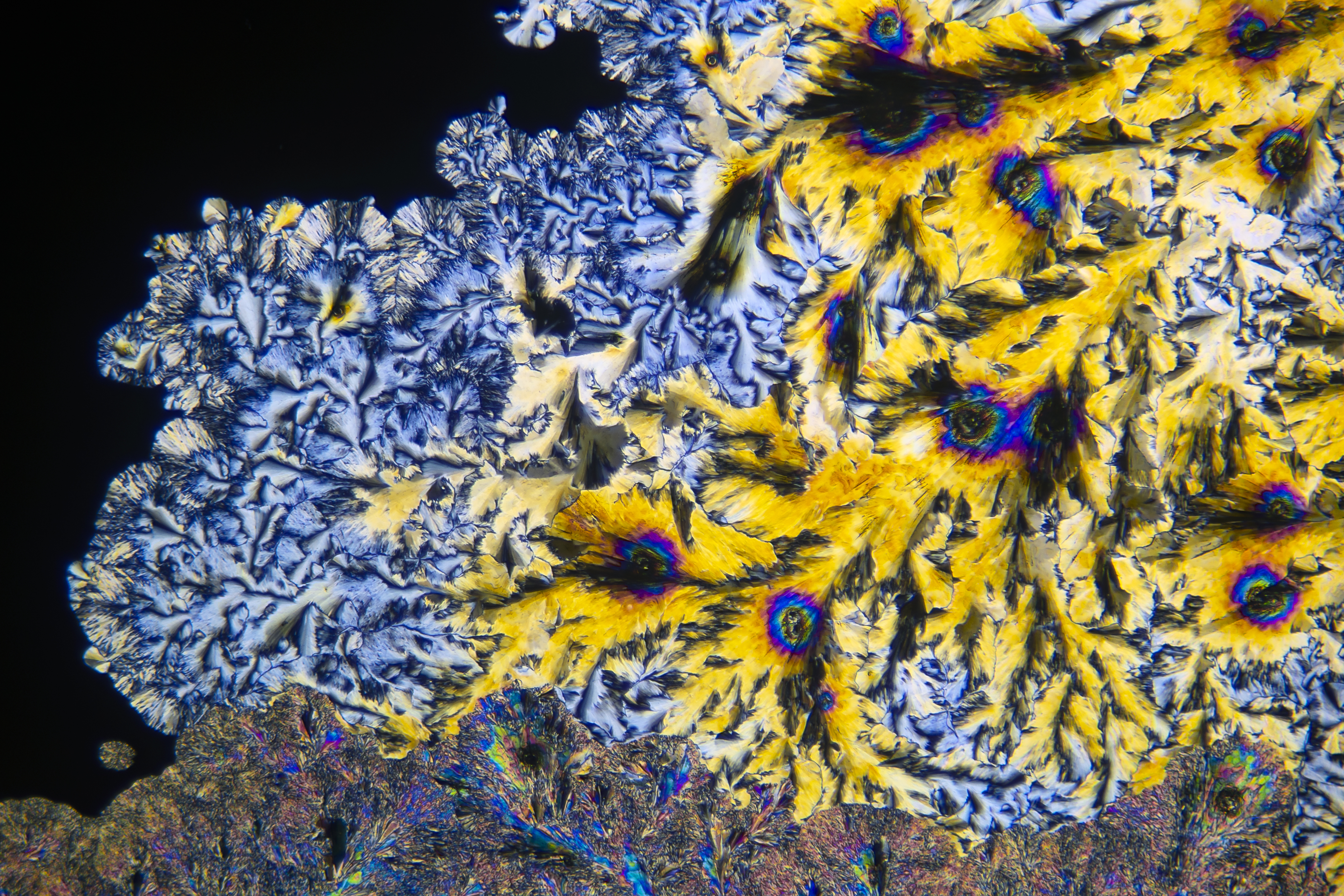
Paracetamol crystals (crystallized from an aqueous solution) under a microscope

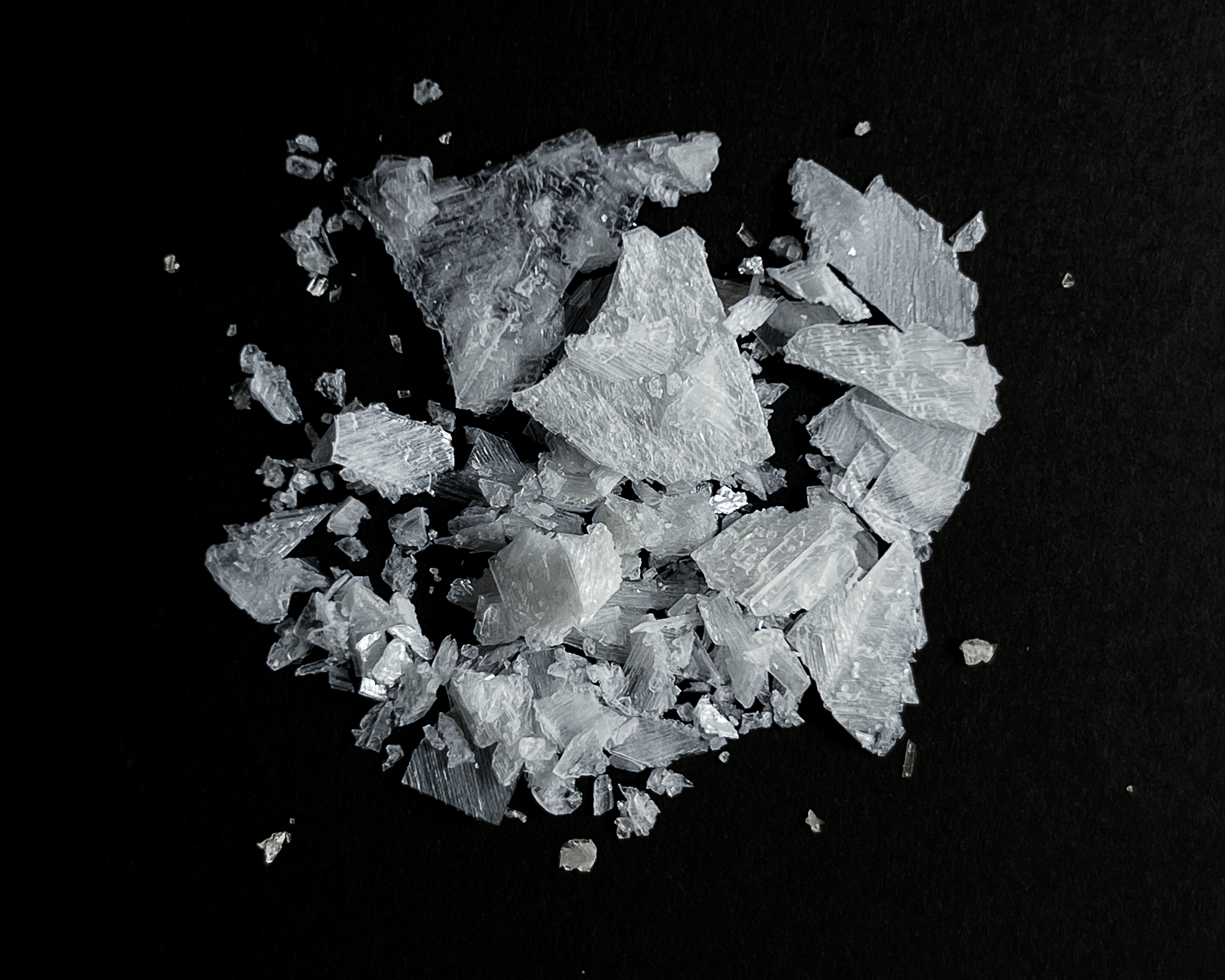
Close-up image of Paracetamol crystals produced by acetylation of 4-aminophenol

4-Aminophenol may be obtained by the amide hydrolysis of paracetamol. This reaction is also used to determine paracetamol in urine samples: After hydrolysis with hydrochloric acid, 4-aminophenol reacts in ammonia solution with a phenol derivate, e.g. salicylic acid, to form an indophenol dye under oxidization by air.

== History ==
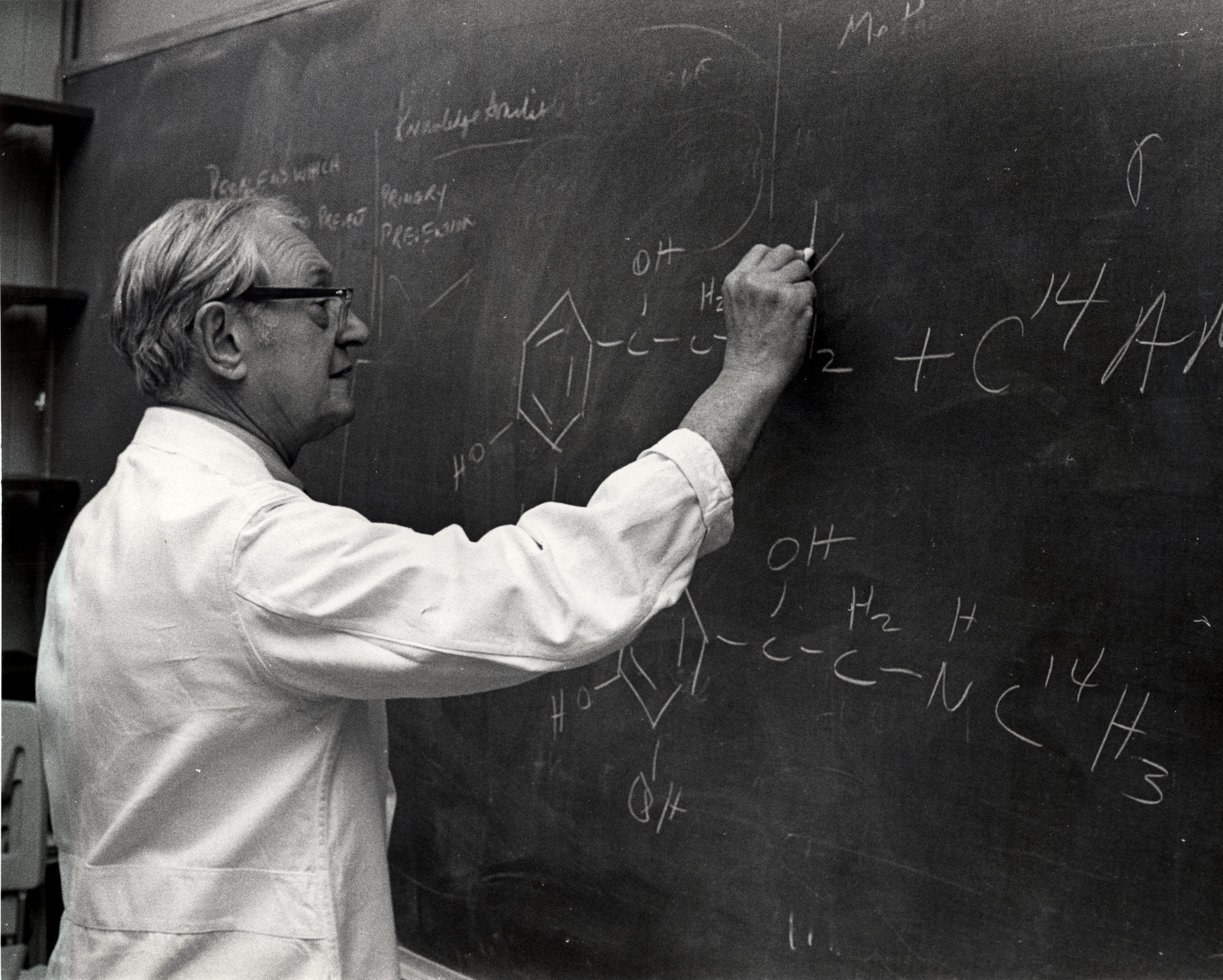
Julius Axelrod (pictured) and Bernard Brodie demonstrated that acetanilide and phenacetin are both metabolized to paracetamol, which is a better-tolerated analgesic.

Acetanilide was the first aniline derivative serendipitously found to possess analgesic as well as antipyretic properties, and was quickly introduced into medical practice under the name of Antifebrin by Cahn & Hepp in 1886. But its unacceptable toxic effects—the most alarming being cyanosis due to methemoglobinemia, an increase of hemoglobin in its ferric [Fe^{3+}] state, called methemoglobin, which cannot bind oxygen, and thus decreases overall carriage of oxygen to tissue—prompted the search for less toxic aniline derivatives. Some reports state that Cahn & Hepp or a French chemist called Charles Gerhardt first synthesized paracetamol in 1852.

Harmon Northrop Morse synthesized paracetamol at Johns Hopkins University via the reduction of p-nitrophenol with tin in glacial acetic acid in 1877, but it was not until 1887 that clinical pharmacologist Joseph von Mering tried paracetamol on humans. In 1893, von Mering published a paper reporting on the clinical results of paracetamol with phenacetin, another aniline derivative. Von Mering claimed that, unlike phenacetin, paracetamol had a slight tendency to produce methemoglobinemia. Paracetamol was then quickly discarded in favor of phenacetin. The sales of phenacetin established Bayer as a leading pharmaceutical company.

Von Mering's claims remained essentially unchallenged for half a century until two teams of researchers from the United States analysed the metabolism of acetanilide and phenacetin. In 1947, David Lester and Leon Greenberg found strong evidence that paracetamol was a major metabolite of acetanilide in human blood, and in a subsequent study, they reported that large doses of paracetamol given to albino rats did not cause methemoglobinemia. In 1948, Bernard Brodie, Julius Axelrod and Frederick Flinn confirmed that paracetamol was the major metabolite of acetanilide in humans, and established that it was just as efficacious an analgesic as its precursor. They also suggested that methemoglobinemia is produced in humans mainly by another metabolite, phenylhydroxylamine. A follow-up paper by Brodie and Axelrod in 1949 established that phenacetin was also metabolized to paracetamol. This led to a "rediscovery" of paracetamol.

Paracetamol was first marketed in the United States in 1950 under the name Trigesic, a combination of paracetamol, aspirin, and caffeine. Reports in 1951 of three users stricken with the blood disease agranulocytosis led to its removal from the marketplace, and it took several years until it became clear that the disease was unconnected. The following year, 1952, paracetamol returned to the U.S. market as a prescription drug. In the United Kingdom, marketing of paracetamol began in 1956 by Sterling-Winthrop Co. as Panadol, available only by prescription, and promoted as preferable to aspirin since it was safe for children and people with ulcers. In 1963, paracetamol was added to the British Pharmacopoeia, and has gained popularity since then as an analgesic agent with few side-effects and little interaction with other pharmaceutical agents.

Concerns about paracetamol's safety delayed its widespread acceptance until the 1970s, but in the 1980s, paracetamol sales exceeded those of aspirin in many countries, including the United Kingdom. This was accompanied by the commercial demise of phenacetin, blamed as the cause of analgesic nephropathy and hematological toxicity. Available in the U.S. without a prescription since 1955 (1960, according to another source), paracetamol has become a common household drug. In 1988, Sterling Winthrop was acquired by Eastman Kodak which sold the over the counter drug rights to SmithKline Beecham in 1994.

In June 2009, an FDA advisory committee recommended that new restrictions be placed on paracetamol use in the United States to help protect people from the potential toxic effects. The maximum single adult dosage would be decreased from 1000 mg to 650 mg, while combinations of paracetamol and other products would be prohibited. Committee members were particularly concerned by the fact that the then-present maximum dosages of paracetamol had been shown to produce alterations in liver function.

In January 2011, the FDA asked manufacturers of prescription combination products containing paracetamol to limit its amount to no more than 325 mg per tablet or capsule and began requiring manufacturers to update the labels of all prescription combination paracetamol products to warn of the potential risk of severe liver damage. Manufacturers had three years to limit the amount of paracetamol in their prescription drug products to 325 mg per dosage unit.

In November 2011, the Medicines and Healthcare products Regulatory Agency revised UK dosing of liquid paracetamol for children.

In September 2013, "Use Only as Directed", an episode of the radio program This American Life highlighted deaths from paracetamol overdose. This report was followed by two reports by ProPublica alleging that the "FDA has long been aware of studies showing the risks of acetaminophen. So has the maker of Tylenol, McNeil Consumer Healthcare, a division of Johnson & Johnson" and "McNeil, the maker of Tylenol, ... has repeatedly opposed safety warnings, dosage restrictions and other measures meant to safeguard users of the drug."

In September 2025, US President Donald Trump and HHS Secretary Robert F. Kennedy Jr. claimed that Tylenol may cause autism and urged pregnant women to avoid it; whereas medical experts, major health organizations, and international studies strongly dispute any causal link, emphasizing that the drug remains safe for treating pain and fever in pregnancy.

== Society and culture ==
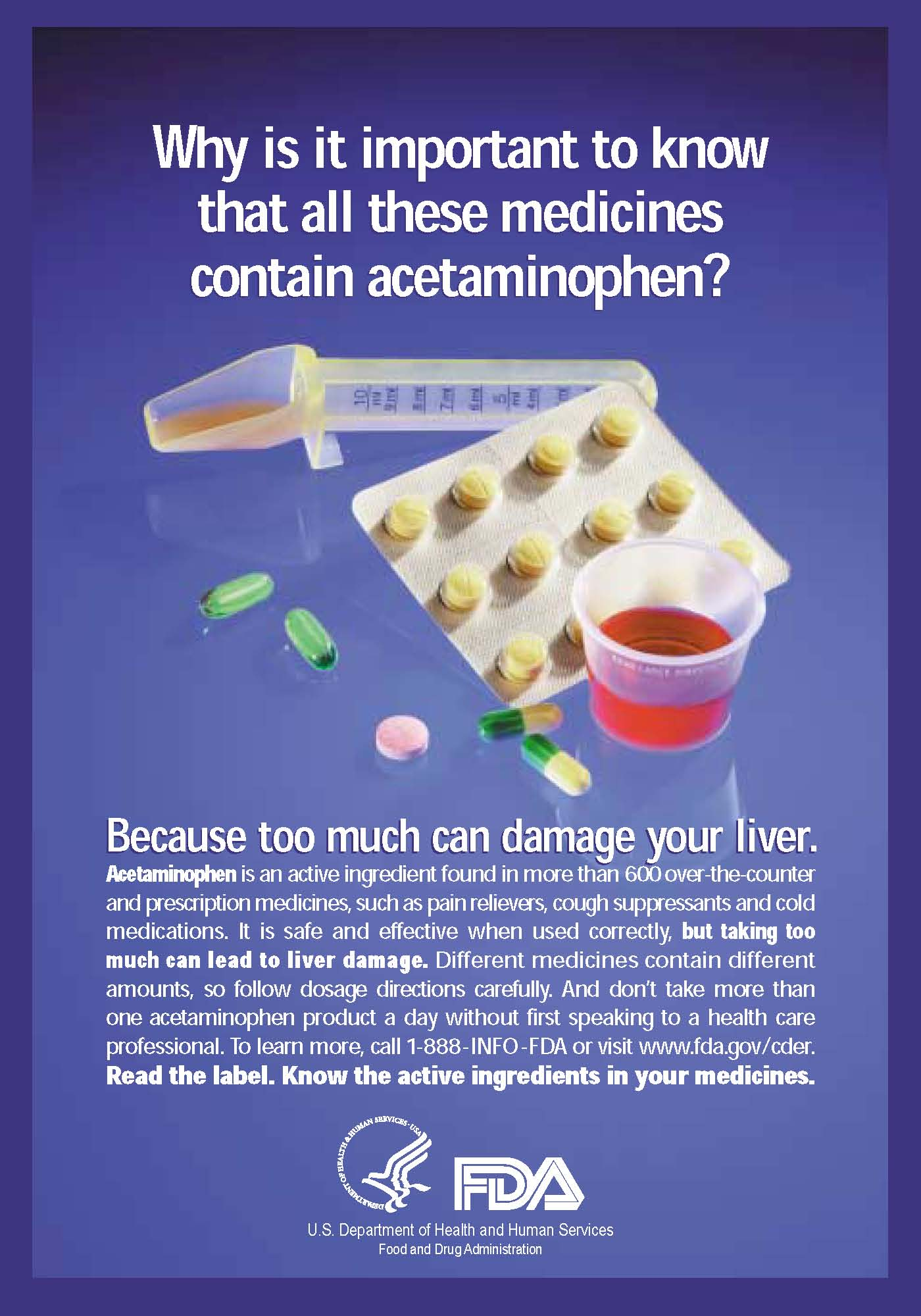
Awareness poster on acetaminophen abuse as issued by the FDA

=== Naming ===
Paracetamol is the Australian Approved Name and the British Approved Name as well as the international nonproprietary name that is used by the World Health Organization (WHO); acetaminophen is the United States Adopted Name and the Canadian and Japanese Accepted Name. Both paracetamol and acetaminophen are contractions of chemical names for the compound. The word paracetamol is a shortened form of para-acetylaminophenol, and was coined by Frederick Stearns & Co in 1956, while the word acetaminophen is a shortened form of N-acetyl-p-aminophenol (APAP), which was coined and first marketed by McNeil Laboratories in 1955. The initialism APAP is used by dispensing pharmacists in the United States.

=== Available forms ===
Paracetamol is available in oral, suppository, and intravenous forms. Intravenous paracetamol is sold under the brand name Ofirmev in the United States.

In some formulations, paracetamol is combined with the opiate codeine, sometimes referred to as co-codamol (BAN) and Panadeine in Australia. In the U.S., this combination is available only by prescription. As of 1 February 2018, medications containing codeine also became prescription-only in Australia. Paracetamol is also combined with other opioids such as dihydrocodeine, referred to as co-dydramol (British Approved Name (BAN)), oxycodone or hydrocodone. Another very commonly used analgesic combination includes paracetamol in combination with propoxyphene napsylate. A combination of paracetamol, codeine, and the doxylamine succinate is also available. Paracetamol is also available combined with butalbital and caffeine as a treatment for tension and migraine headaches.

Paracetamol is sometimes combined with phenylephrine hydrochloride. Sometimes a third active ingredient, such as ascorbic acid, caffeine, chlorpheniramine maleate, or guaifenesin is added to this combination.

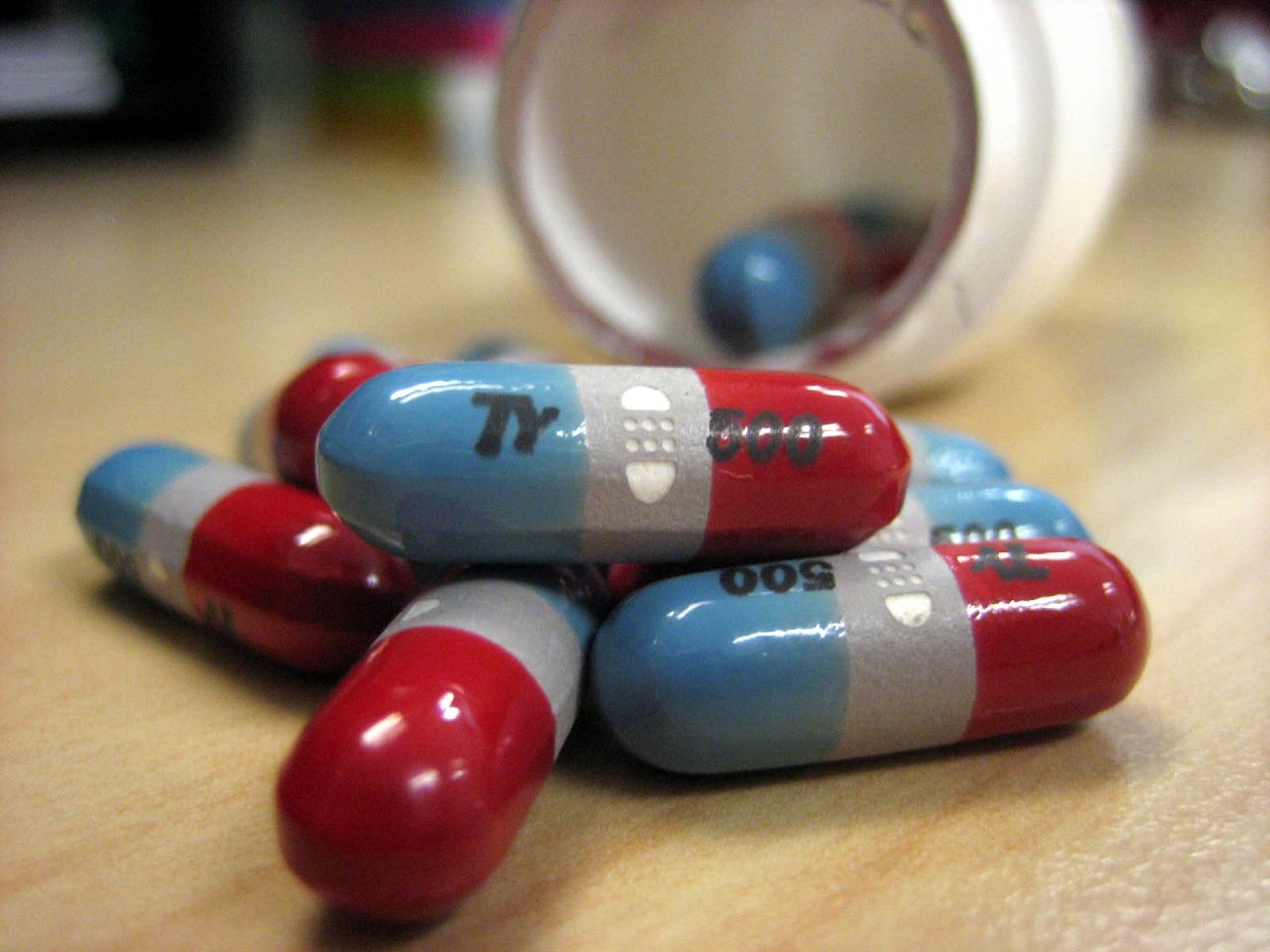
Tylenol 500 mg capsules

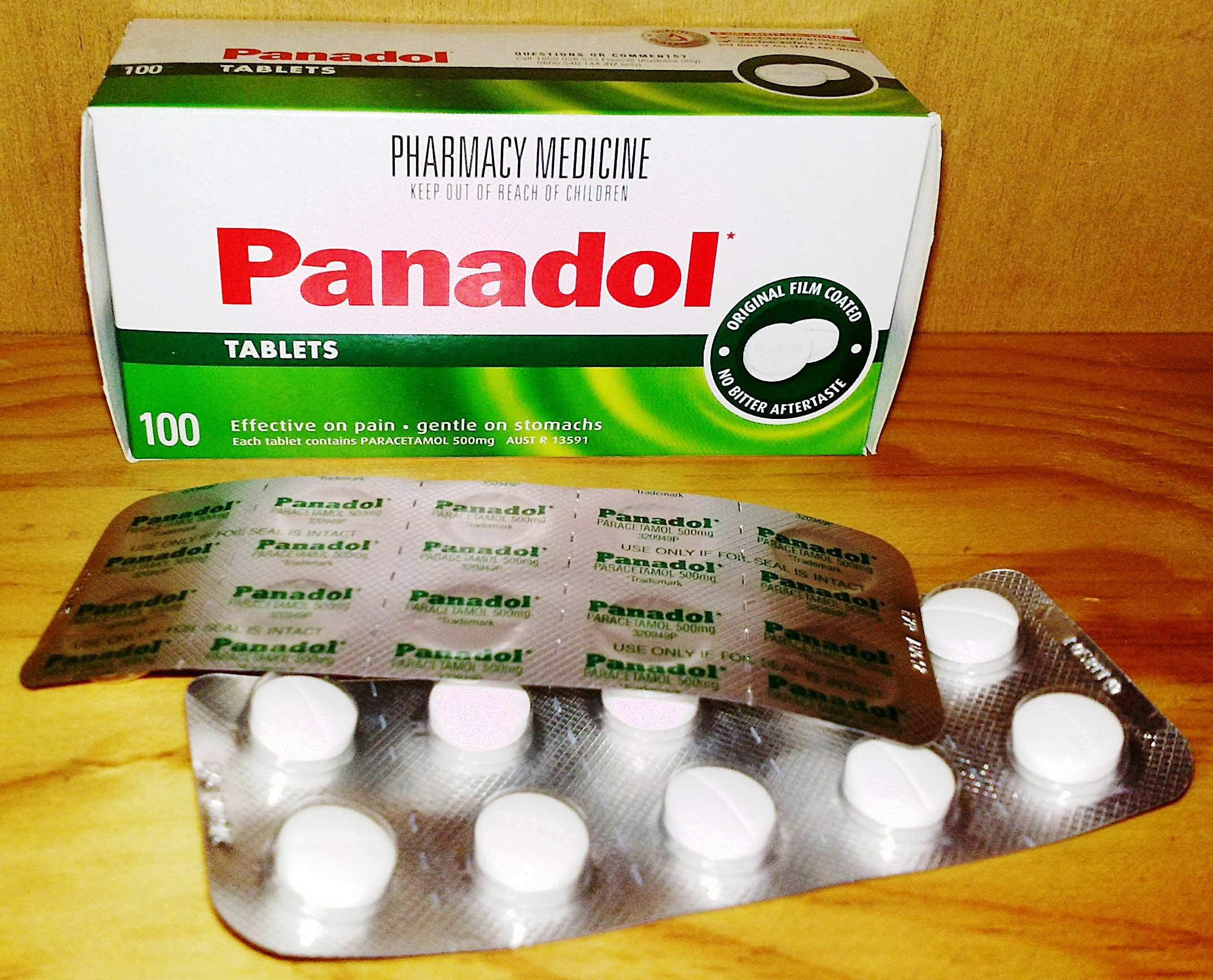
Panadol 500 mg tablets

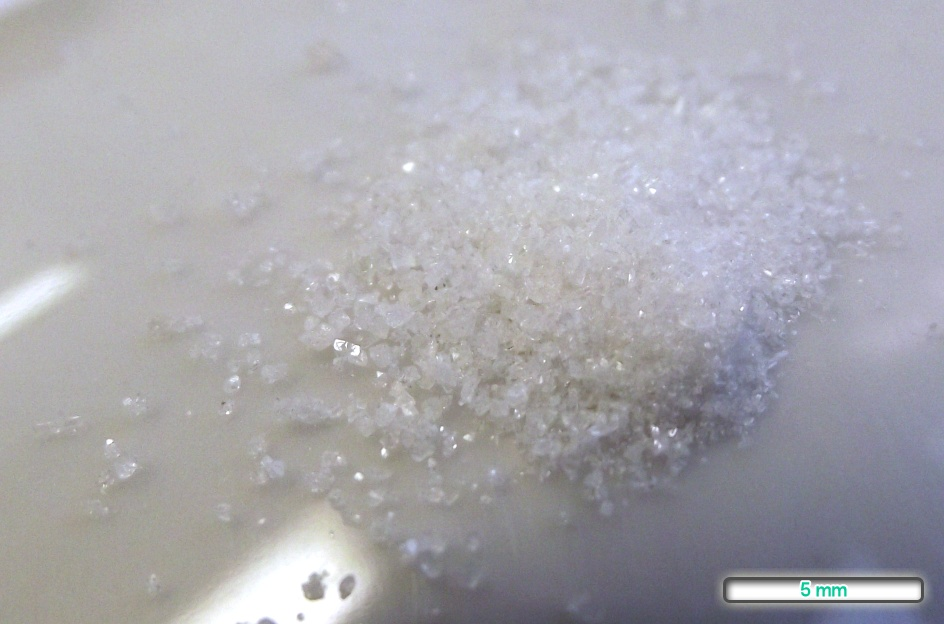
For comparison: The pure drug is a colourless crystalline powder.

== Veterinary use ==
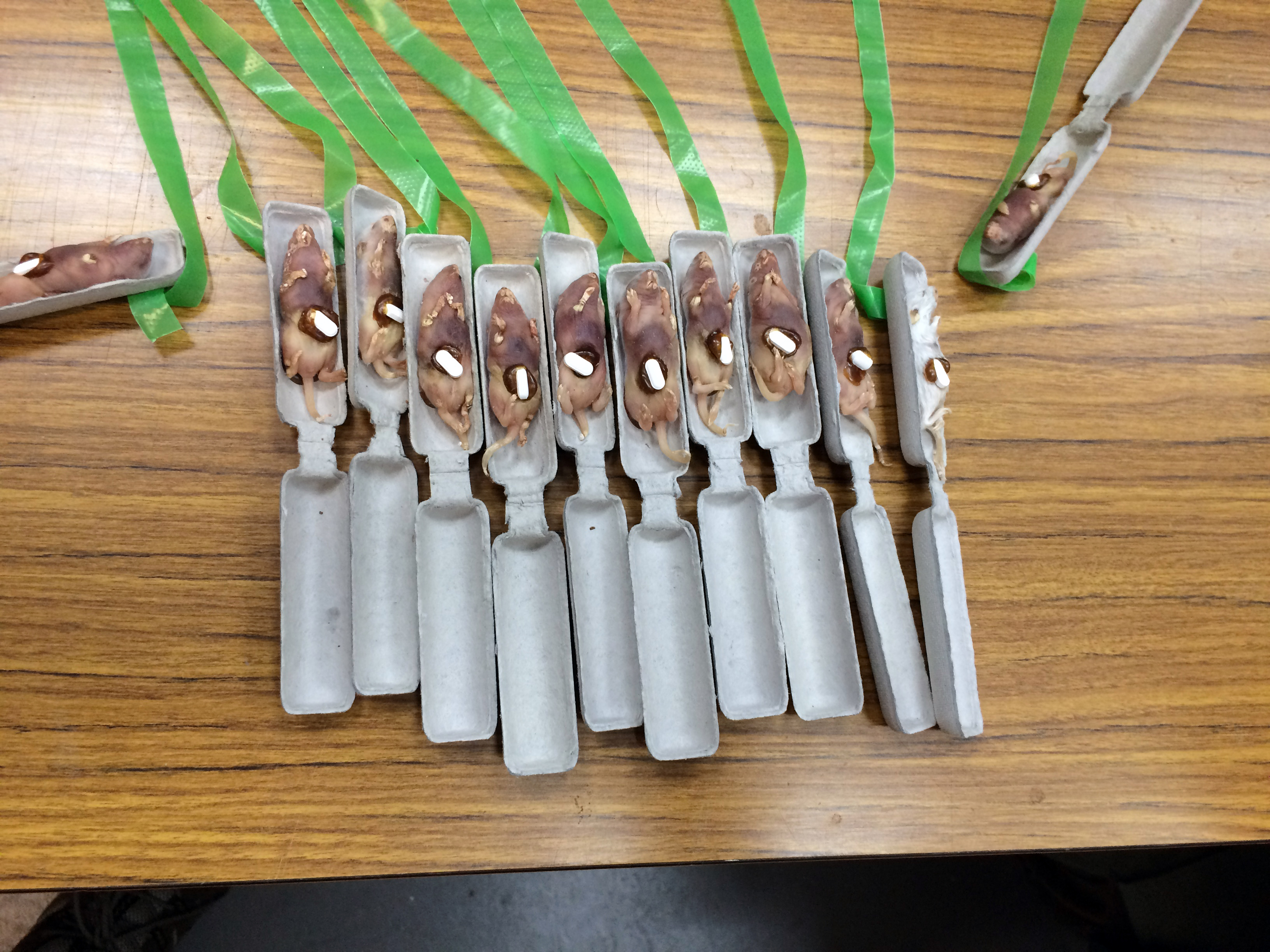
Brown tree snake aerial bait cartridges consisting of dead mice with 80 mg paracetamol tablets

=== Cats ===
Paracetamol is extremely toxic to cats, which lack the necessary UGT1A6 enzyme to detoxify it. Initial symptoms include vomiting, salivation, and discoloration of the tongue and gums. Unlike an overdose in humans, liver damage is rarely the cause of death; instead, methemoglobin formation and the production of Heinz bodies in red blood cells inhibit oxygen transport by the blood, causing asphyxiation (methaemoglobinaemia and haemolytic anaemia). Acetylcysteine is used to treat cats with toxicity arising from paracetamol.

=== Dogs ===
Paracetamol has been reported to be as effective as aspirin in the treatment of musculoskeletal pain in dogs. Paracetamol is considered a weak analgesic and is usually combined with codeine, although the efficacy of this formulation has not been evaluated.

The main effect of toxicity in dogs is liver damage, and GI ulceration has been reported. Acetylcysteine treatment is efficacious in dogs when administered within two hours of paracetamol ingestion.

=== Snakes ===
Paracetamol is lethal to snakes and has been suggested as a chemical control program for the invasive brown tree snake (Boiga irregularis) in Guam. Doses of 80 mg are inserted into dead mice that are scattered by helicopter as lethal bait to be consumed by the snakes.
