= Endocannabinoid transporter =

The endocannabinoid transporters (eCBTs) are transport proteins for the endocannabinoids. Most neurotransmitters are water-soluble and require transmembrane proteins to transport them across the cell membrane. The endocannabinoids (anandamide, AEA, and 2-arachidonoylglycerol, 2-AG) on the other hand, are non-charged lipids that readily cross lipid membranes. However, since the endocannabinoids are water immiscible, protein transporters have been described that act as carriers to solubilize and transport the endocannabinoids through the aqueous cytoplasm. These include the heat shock proteins (Hsp70s) and fatty acid-binding proteins for anandamide (FABPs). FABPs such as FABP1, FABP3, FABP5, and FABP7 have been shown to bind endocannabinoids. FABP inhibitors attenuate the breakdown of anandamide by the enzyme fatty acid amide hydrolase (FAAH) in cell culture. One of these inhibitors (SB-FI-26), isolated from a virtual library of a million compounds, belongs to a class of compounds (named the "truxilloids') that act as an anti-nociceptive agent with mild anti-inflammatory activity in mice. These truxillic acids and their derivatives have been known to have anti-inflammatory and anti-nociceptive effects in mice and are active components of a Chinese herbal medicine (Incarvillea sinensis) used to treat rheumatism and pain in human. The blockade of anandamide transport may, at least in part, be the mechanism through which these compounds exert their anti-nociceptive effects.

Studies have found the involvement of cholesterol in membrane uptake and transport of anandamide. Cholesterol stimulates both the insertion of anandamide into synthetic lipid monolayers and bilayers, and its transport across bilayer membranes, suggest that besides putative anandamide protein-transporters, cholesterol could be an important component of the anandamide transport machinery, and as cholesterol-dependent modulation of CB1 cannabinoid receptors in nerve cells. The catalytic efficiency (i.e., the ratio between maximal velocity and Michaelis–Menten constant) of the AEA membrane transporter (AMT) is almost doubled compared with control cells, demonstrate that, among the proteins of the "endocannabinoid system," only CB1 and AMT critically depend on membrane cholesterol content, an observation that may have important implications for the role of CB1 in protecting nerve cells against (endo)cannabinoid-induced apoptosis. This can be a reason, why the use of drugs to lower cholesterol is tied to a higher depression risk, and the correlation between levels and increased death rates from suicide and other violent causes.

Activation of CB1 enhances AMT activity through increased nitric oxide synthase (NOS) activity and subsequent increase of NO production, whereas AMT activity instead is reduced by activation of the CB2 cannabinoid receptor, which inhibits NOS and NO release, also suggesting the distribution of these receptors may drive AEA directional transport through the blood–brain barrier and other endothelial cells.

As reviewed in 2016; "Many of the AMT (EMT) proposals have fallen by the wayside." To date a transmembrane protein transporter has not been identified.

== See also ==
- Endocannabinoid reuptake inhibitor
- Endocannabinoid enhancer
- Endocannabinoid system
