= CB1 =

CB1 may refer to:

- CB1, a postcode district in the CB postcode area
- Cannabinoid receptor 1, a receptor for cannabinoids in the brain
- Crash Bandicoot (video game), the first game in the Crash Bandicoot series
- Manhattan Community Board 1
