= Anandamide =

Chemical compound (fatty acid neurotransmitter)

Names
- Preferred IUPAC name (5Z,8Z,11Z,14Z)-N-(2-hydroxyethyl)icosa-5,8,11,14-tetraenamide
- Other names N-arachidonoylethanolamine arachidonoylethanolamide

Identifiers
CAS Number	94421-68-8
3D model (JSmol)	Interactive image; Interactive image
ChEBI	CHEBI:2700
ChEMBL	ChEMBL15848
ChemSpider	4445241
IUPHAR/BPS	2364
KEGG	C11695
MeSH	Anandamide
PubChem CID	5281969
UNII	UR5G69TJKH
CompTox Dashboard (EPA)	DTXSID301017453
- InChI: InChI=1S/C22H37NO2/c1-2-3-4-5-6-7-8-9-10-11-12-13-14-15-16-17-18-19-22(25)23-20-21-24/h6-7,9-10,12-13,15-16,24H,2-5,8,11,14,17-21H2,1H3,(H,23,25)/b7-6-,10-9-,13-12-,16-15- Key: LGEQQWMQCRIYKG-DOFZRALJSA-N; InChI=1/C22H37NO2/c1-2-3-4-5-6-7-8-9-10-11-12-13-14-15-16-17-18-19-22(25)23-20-21-24/h6-7,9-10,12-13,15-16,24H,2-5,8,11,14,17-21H2,1H3,(H,23,25)/b7-6-,10-9-,13-12-,16-15- Key: LGEQQWMQCRIYKG-DOFZRALJBA
- SMILES: O=C(NCCO)CCC\C=C/C\C=C/C\C=C/C\C=C/CCCCC; CCCCC/C=C\C/C=C\C/C=C\C/C=C\CCCC(=O)NCCO

Properties
Chemical formula	C_{22}H_{37}NO_{2}
Molar mass	347.543 g·mol^{−1}
- Except where otherwise noted, data are given for materials in their standard state (at 25 °C [77 °F], 100 kPa). verify (what is ?) Infobox references

Anandamide (ANA), also referred to as N-arachidonoylethanolamine (AEA), is a fatty acid neurotransmitter belonging to the fatty acid derivative group known as N-acylethanolamines (NAE). Anandamide takes its name from the Sanskrit word ananda (आनन्द), meaning "joy, bliss, delight," plus amide. Anandamide, the first discovered endocannabinoid, engages with the body's endocannabinoid system by binding to the same cannabinoid receptors that THC found in cannabis acts on. Anandamide can be found within tissues in a wide range of animals. It has also been found in plants, such as the cacao tree.

Anandamide is derived from the non-oxidative metabolism of arachidonic acid, an essential omega-6 fatty acid. It is synthesized from N-arachidonoyl phosphatidylethanolamine by multiple pathways. It is degraded primarily by the fatty acid amide hydrolase (FAAH) enzyme, which converts anandamide into ethanolamine and arachidonic acid. As such, inhibitors of FAAH lead to elevated anandamide levels and are being pursued for possible therapeutic use.

== Discovery ==
Anandamide was first isolated and its structure determined in 1992 by Czech analytical chemist Lumír Ondřej Hanuš and American pharmacologist William Anthony Devane in the laboratory of Raphael Mechoulam at the Hebrew University of Jerusalem. Following the discovery of the CB1 cannabinoid receptor in 1988, the team isolated the endogenous ligand from pig brain tissue.

The compound was named by Devane and Mechoulam by combining the Sanskrit word ānanda (meaning "bliss", "joy", or "supreme delight") with the chemical suffix amide. Drawing upon the Sanskrit root, a central concept in Vedic philosophy representing inner bliss, the name was proposed by Devane, who was studying Sanskrit at the time to better capture the unique, soothing physiological profile of the newly identified neurotransmitter.

== Research ==
According to in vitro research, anandamide effects are mediated primarily by CB_{1} cannabinoid receptors in the central nervous system, and CB_{2} cannabinoid receptors in the periphery. The latter appear to be involved in functions of the immune system. Cannabinoid receptors were originally discovered as sensitive to Δ^{9}-tetrahydrocannabinol (Δ^{9}-THC, commonly called THC), which is the primary psychoactive cannabinoid found in cannabis. The discovery of anandamide came from research into CB_{1} and CB_{2}, as it was inevitable that a naturally occurring (endogenous) chemical would be found to affect these receptors.

Anandamide is under research for its potential involvement in the implantation of the early stage embryo in its blastocyst form into the uterus. Therefore, cannabinoids such as Δ^{9}-THC might influence processes during the earliest stages of human pregnancy. Peak plasma anandamide occurs at ovulation and positively correlates with peak estradiol and gonadotrophin levels, suggesting that these may be involved in the regulation of anandamide levels. Subsequently, anandamide has been proposed as a biomarker of infertility, but so far lacks any predictive values in order to be used clinically.

=== Behavior ===
Both the CB1 and CB2 receptors (the binding site of anandamide) are under research for a possible role in positive and negative interpretation of environment and setting. The binding relationship of anandamide and the CB1/CB2 may affect neurotransmission of dopamine, serotonin, GABA, and glutamate.

Endocannabinoids may disturb homeostasis in several ways: by enhancing hunger sensations, encouraging increased food intake, and shifting energy balance towards energy storage. A resultant decrease in energy expenditure is observed.

Cortical glutamatergic transmission may be modulated by endocannabinoids during stress and fear habituation.

=== Obesity and liver disease ===
Blockade of CB1 receptors was found to improve lipid resistance and lipid profile in obese subjects with type 2 diabetes. Elevated anandamide levels are found in people with nonalcoholic fatty liver disease, nonalcoholic steatohepatitis, and liver fibrosis.

=== Topical effects ===
The American Academy of Dermatology has named topical anandamide a promising therapy for cutaneous lupus erythematosus.

== Biosynthesis ==
In humans, anandamide is biosynthesized from N-arachidonoyl phosphatidylethanolamine (NAPE). In turn, NAPE arises by transfer of arachidonic acid from lecithin to the free amine of cephalin through an N-acyltransferase enzyme. Anandamide synthesis from NAPE occurs via multiple pathways and includes enzymes such as phospholipase A2, phospholipase C and N-acetylphosphatidylethanolamine-hydrolysing phospholipase D (NAPE-PLD), with other key enzymes yet to be identified.

The crystal structure of NAPE-PLD in complex with phosphatidylethanolamine and deoxycholate shows how the cannabinoid anandamide is generated from membrane N-acylphosphatidylethanolamines (NAPEs), and reveals that bile acids – which are mainly involved in the absorption of lipids in the small intestine – modulate its biogenesis.

== Metabolism ==
Endogenous anandamide is present at very low levels and has a very short half-life due to the action of the enzyme fatty acid amide hydrolase (FAAH), which breaks it down into free arachidonic acid and ethanolamine. Studies of piglets show that dietary levels of arachidonic acid and other essential fatty acids affect the levels of anandamide and other endocannabinoids in the brain. High fat diet feeding in mice increases levels of anandamide in the liver and increases lipogenesis. Anandamide may be relevant to the development of obesity, at least in rodents.

Paracetamol (known as acetaminophen in the US and Canada) is metabolically combined with arachidonic acid by FAAH to form AM404. This metabolite is a potent agonist at the TRPV1 vanilloid receptor, a weak agonist at both CB_{1} and CB_{2} receptors, and an inhibitor of anandamide reuptake. Consequently, anandamide levels in the body and brain are elevated. Thus, paracetamol acts as a pro-drug for a cannabimimetic metabolite, which may be partially or fully responsible for its analgesic effects.

Black pepper contains the alkaloid guineesine, which is an anandamide reuptake inhibitor. It may therefore increase anandamide's physiological effects.

== Transport ==
Endocannabinoid transporters for anandamide and 2-arachidonoylglycerol include the heat shock proteins (Hsp70s) and fatty acid binding proteins (FABPs).

Anandamide shows a preference for binding to cholesterol and ceramide over other membrane lipids. Cholesterol acts as a binding partner for anandamide. Initially, a hydrogen bond facilitates their interaction. Following this, anandamide is drawn towards the membrane interior, where it forms a molecular complex with cholesterol. This process involves a conformational adaptation of anandamide to the apolar membrane environment. Subsequently, the anandamide-cholesterol complex is directed to the cannabinoid receptor (CB1) and then exits.

== See also ==
- Virodhamine
