= CID16020046 =

Chemical compound

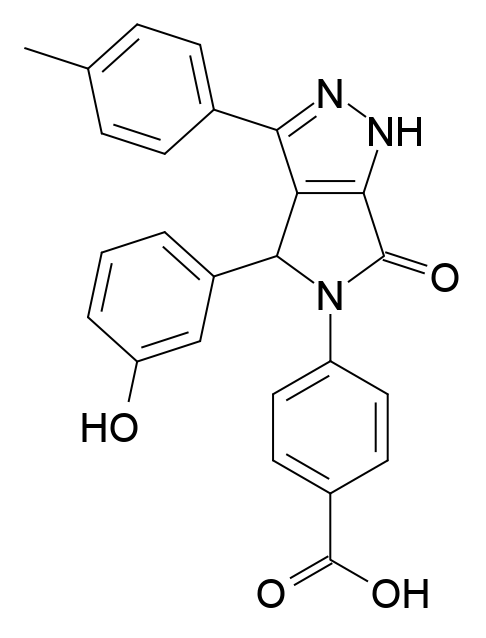

Identifiers
- IUPAC name: 4-[4,6-Dihydro-4-(3-hydroxyphenyl)-3-(4-methylphenyl)-6-oxopyrrolo[3,4-c]pyrazol-5(1H)-yl]benzoic acid
- CAS Number: 834903-43-4
- PubChem CID: 16020046
- IUPHAR/BPS: 6577
- ChemSpider: 12543007
- UNII: 5AUY4Y2UPU
- CompTox Dashboard (EPA): DTXSID001112141
- ECHA InfoCard: 100.233.214

Chemical and physical data
- Formula: C_{25}H_{19}N_{3}O_{4}
- Molar mass: 425.444 g·mol^{−1}
- 3D model (JSmol): Interactive image
- SMILES: Cc5ccc(c3n[nH]c4C(=O)N(c1ccc(C(=O)O)cc1)C(c2cccc(O)c2)c34)cc5
- InChI: InChI=1S/C25H19N3O4/c1-14-5-7-15(8-6-14)21-20-22(27-26-21)24(30)28(18-11-9-16(10-12-18)25(31)32)23(20)17-3-2-4-19(29)13-17/h2-13,23,29H,1H3,(H,26,27)(H,31,32); Key:VGUQVYZXABOXCX-UHFFFAOYSA-N

CID16020046 is a compound which acts as an inverse agonist at the former orphan receptor GPR55, and may be the first selective inverse agonist characterised for this receptor. It was found to block a number of GPR55 mediated responses such as wound healing and activation of immune system T-cells and B-cells, as well as showing inverse agonist activity in the absence of GPR55 agonist stimulation. However while it was found to have good selectivity over the related CB_{1} and CB_{2} cannabinoid receptors as well as a number of other targets, CID16020046 has not yet been tested against another related receptor GPR18, so its selectivity for GPR55 over this target has not been established. It has anti-inflammatory actions, has been used to study the interaction between GPR55 mediated and CB_{1} mediated activity, and research using this compound has revealed a role for GPR55 in learning and memory.

== See also ==
- O-1918
- PSB-CB5
- PSB-SB-487
