= PSB-SB-487 =

Chemical compound

Identifiers
- IUPAC name: 7-(1,1-Dimethyloctyl)-5-hydroxy-3-(2-hydroxybenzyl)-2H-chromen-2-one
- CAS Number: 1399049-81-0
- PubChem CID: 70678101
- ChemSpider: 28667155
- ChEMBL: ChEMBL2181542
- CompTox Dashboard (EPA): DTXSID401045358

Chemical and physical data
- Formula: C_{26}H_{32}O_{4}
- Molar mass: 408.538 g·mol^{−1}
- 3D model (JSmol): Interactive image
- SMILES: OC1=C(CC2=CC3=C(C=C(C(C)(C)CCCCCCC)C=C3O)OC2=O)C=CC=C1
- InChI: InChI=1S/C26H32O4/c1-4-5-6-7-10-13-26(2,3)20-16-23(28)21-15-19(25(29)30-24(21)17-20)14-18-11-8-9-12-22(18)27/h8-9,11-12,15-17,27-28H,4-7,10,13-14H2,1-3H3; Key:YNWOMOUVWNKICO-UHFFFAOYSA-N

PSB-SB-487 is an experimental drug which is used as a pharmacological research tool. It is a coumarin derivative which is an antagonist at the former orphan receptor GPR55. Unlike older GPR55 antagonists such as O-1918, PSB-SB-487 has good selectivity over the related receptor GPR18, with an IC_{50} of 113nM at GPR55 vs 12500nM at GPR18. However it has poorer selectivity over other related receptors, acting as a weak antagonist at CB_{1} with a Ki of 1170nM, and a partial agonist at CB_{2} with a Ki of 292nM.

== See also ==
- CID-16020046
- PSB-SB-1202
