= O-1602 =

Chemical compound

Identifiers
- IUPAC name: 5-methyl-4-[(1R,6R)-3-methyl-6-prop-1-en-2-ylcyclohex-2-en-1-yl]benzene-1,3-diol
- CAS Number: 317321-41-8
- PubChem CID: 45073499
- IUPHAR/BPS: 5525
- ChemSpider: 23014383
- UNII: 59F4R2N5N5
- CompTox Dashboard (EPA): DTXSID001018640

Chemical and physical data
- Formula: C_{17}H_{22}O_{2}
- Molar mass: 258.361 g·mol^{−1}
- 3D model (JSmol): Interactive image
- SMILES: CC1=C[C@@H](C2=C(C)C=C(O)C=C2O)[C@H](C(C)=C)CC1
- InChI: InChI=1S/C17H22O2/c1-10(2)14-6-5-11(3)7-15(14)17-12(4)8-13(18)9-16(17)19/h7-9,14-15,18-19H,1,5-6H2,2-4H3/t14-,15+/m0/s1; Key:KDZOUSULXZNDJH-LSDHHAIUSA-N

O-1602 is a synthetic compound most closely related to abnormal cannabidiol, and more distantly related in structure to cannabinoid drugs such as THC. O-1602 does not bind to the classical cannabinoid receptors CB_{1} or CB_{2} with any significant affinity, but instead is an agonist at several other receptors which appear to be related to the cannabinoid receptors, particularly GPR18 and GPR55. These previously orphan receptors have been found to be targets for a number of endogenous and synthetic cannabinoid compounds, and are thought to be responsible for most of the non-CB_{1}, non-CB_{2} mediated effects that have become evident in the course of cannabinoid research. O-1602 produces some effects shared with classical cannabinoid compounds such as analgesic and antiinflammatory effects and appetite stimulation, but it does not produce sedation or psychoactive effects, and has several actions in the gut and brain that are not shared with typical cannabinoid agonists.

== See also ==
- Cannabidiol
- O-1918
