= PSB-CB5 =

Chemical compound

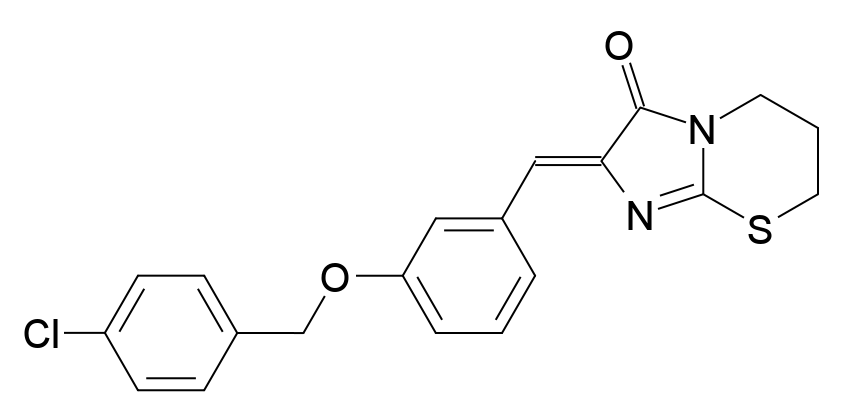

Identifiers
- IUPAC name: (2Z)-2-[(3-[(4-chlorophenyl)methoxy]phenyl)methylidene]-6,7-dihydro-5H-imidazo[2,1-b][1,3]thiazin-3-one
- CAS Number: 1627710-30-8
- PubChem CID: 85469571
- ChemSpider: 34226942
- UNII: 75Q5Q6F7LA
- CompTox Dashboard (EPA): DTXSID301031964

Chemical and physical data
- Formula: C_{20}H_{17}ClN_{2}O_{2}S
- Molar mass: 384.88 g·mol^{−1}
- 3D model (JSmol): Interactive image
- SMILES: Clc4ccc(cc4)COc(c2)cccc2\C=C(\C1=O)/N=C3N1CCCS3
- InChI: InChI=1S/C20H17ClN2O2S/c21-16-7-5-14(6-8-16)13-25-17-4-1-3-15(11-17)12-18-19(24)23-9-2-10-26-20(23)22-18/h1,3-8,11-12H,2,9-10,13H2/b18-12-; Key:XJBQRMOGMULGPP-PDGQHHTCSA-N

PSB-CB5 (CID-85469571) is a compound which acts as an antagonist at the former orphan receptor GPR18, and is the first selective antagonist characterised for this receptor, with an IC_{50} of 279nM, and good selectivity over related receptors (over 36x selectivity vs CB_{1} and GPR55, and 14x vs CB_{2}.) As all previously known antagonists for GPR18 also antagonise GPR55, it has been difficult to separate the effects of these two receptor targets, so the discovery of a selective GPR18 antagonist is expected to be useful in research into the actions of this receptor.

== See also ==
- CID-16020046
- O-1918
