= PSB-SB-1202 =

Chemical compound

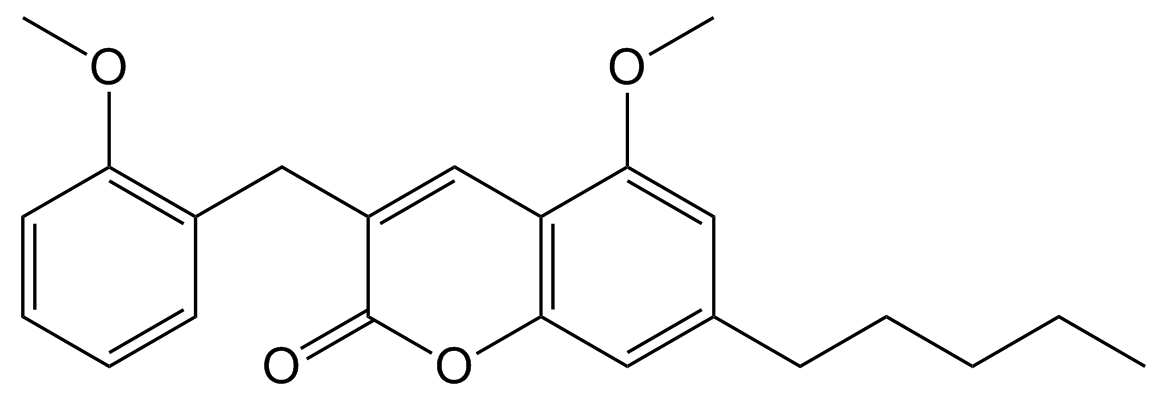

Identifiers
- IUPAC name: 7-pentyl-5-methoxy-3-(2-methoxybenzyl)-2H-chromen-2-one
- CAS Number: 1399049-60-5
- PubChem CID: 70677953
- ChemSpider: 28668367
- UNII: 429P6KRK5A
- CompTox Dashboard (EPA): DTXSID101045359

Chemical and physical data
- Formula: C_{23}H_{26}O_{4}
- Molar mass: 366.457 g·mol^{−1}
- 3D model (JSmol): Interactive image
- SMILES: O=C1C(CC2=C(OC)C=CC=C2)=CC3=C(C=C(CCCCC)C=C3OC)O1
- InChI: InChI=1S/C23H26O4/c1-4-5-6-9-16-12-21(26-3)19-15-18(23(24)27-22(19)13-16)14-17-10-7-8-11-20(17)25-2/h7-8,10-13,15H,4-6,9,14H2,1-3H3; Key:VZYCAUIYIZSPQY-UHFFFAOYSA-N

PSB-SB-1202 is a coumarin derivative which is an agonist at the cannabinoid receptors CB_{1} and CB_{2}, with a CB_{1} Ki of 32nM and a CB_{2} Ki of 49nM. It is also a weak antagonist at the related receptor GPR55, with an IC_{50} of 6350nM, but has no significant affinity for GPR18.

== See also ==
- PSB-SB-487
