= Abnormal cannabidiol =

Synthetic, cannabinoid-like compound

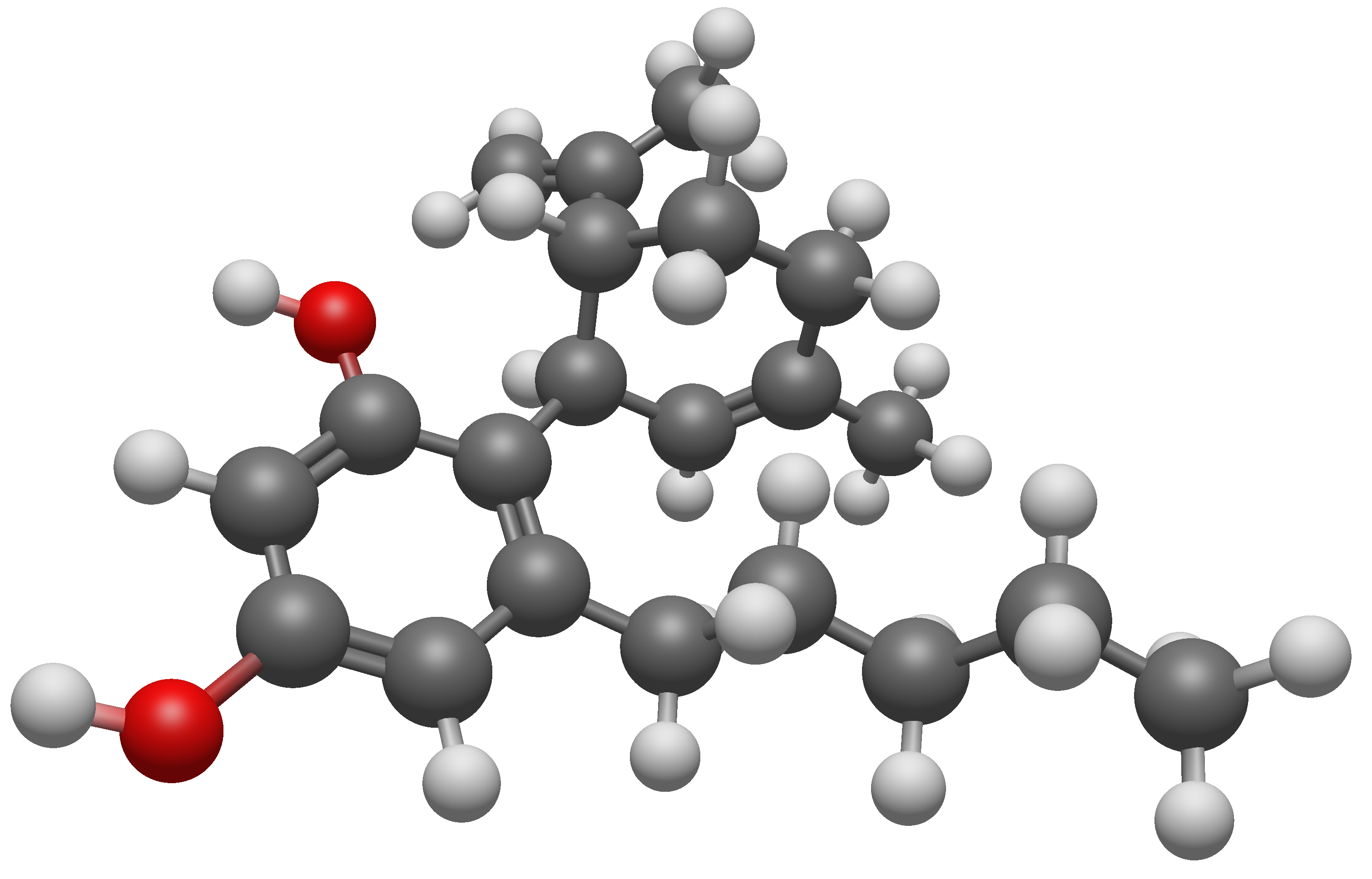

Identifiers
- IUPAC name: 4-[(1R,6R)-3-methyl-6-(prop-1-en-2-yl)cyclohex-2-en-1-yl]-5-pentylbenzene-1,3-diol
- CAS Number: 22972-55-0
- PubChem CID: 89949
- ChemSpider: 2321442
- UNII: T4WF2D7YPH
- CompTox Dashboard (EPA): DTXSID10945675

Chemical and physical data
- Formula: C_{21}H_{30}O_{2}
- Molar mass: 314.469 g·mol^{−1}
- 3D model (JSmol): Interactive image
- SMILES: CCCCCC1=CC(=CC(=C1[C@H]2C=C(CC[C@H]2C(=C)C)C)O)O
- InChI: InChI=1S/C21H30O2/c1-5-6-7-8-16-12-17(22)13-20(23)21(16)19-11-15(4)9-10-18(19)14(2)3/h11-13,18-19,22-23H,2,5-10H2,1,3-4H3/t18-,19-/m0/s1; Key:YWEZXUNAYVCODW-OALUTQOASA-N

Abnormal cannabidiol (Abn-CBD) is a synthetic regioisomer of cannabidiol, which unlike most other cannabinoids produces vasodilator effects, lowers blood pressure, and induces cell migration, cell proliferation and mitogen-activated protein kinase activation in microglia, but without producing any psychoactive or sedative effects. Abn-CBD can be found as an impurity in synthetic cannabidiol.

== Receptor activity ==
It has been shown that the actions of abnormal cannabidiol are mediated through a site separate from the CB_{1} and CB_{2} receptors, which responds to abnormal cannabidiol, O-1602, and the endogenous ligands: anandamide (AEA), N-arachidonoylglycine (NAGly) and N-arachidonoyl-L-serine. Multiple lines of evidence support the proposed identification of this novel target in microglia as the previously orphan receptor GPR18. Another possible target of abnormal cannabidiol is GPR55, which has also received much attention as a putative cannabinoid receptor, although a growing body of evidence points to lysophosphatidylinositol (LPI) as the endogenous ligand for GPR55. Further research suggests there are yet more additional cannabinoid receptors.

== Pharmacodynamics ==
Research of the effects on abnormal cannabidiol in mice has indicated that atypical cannabinoids have therapeutic potential in a variety of inflammatory conditions, including those of the gastrointestinal tract. After inducing colitis by means of trinitrobenzene sulfonic acid, wound healing of both human umbilical vein endothelial and epithelial cells was enhanced by the Abn-CBD.

== See also ==
- Cannabinoids
- Cannabinoid receptors
- Delta-6-Cannabidiol
- O-1918
- Rimonabant
