= 2OG =

2OG may be an abbreviation for the following:

- 2-Oleoylglycerol
- 2-oxoglutarate
- 2d Operations Group
- Oxoglutarate dehydrogenase complex
