= C17H23N3O =

The molecular formula C_{17}H_{23}N_{3}O may refer to:

- Mepyramine, a first generation antihistamine
- Piperylone, a pyrazolone with analgesic, anti-inflammatory, and antipyretic properties
- PSN-375,963, a selective ligand
