= OR51B2 =

Protein-coding gene in the species Homo sapiens

Identifiers
- Aliases: OR51B2, HOR5'Beta3, OR51B1P, olfactory receptor family 51 subfamily B member 2 (gene/pseudogene), olfactory receptor family 51 subfamily B member 2
- External IDs: MGI: 1341900; GeneCards: OR51B2

Gene location (Human)
| Chr. | Chromosome 11 (human) |
| Band | 11p15.4 | Start | 5,323,359 bp |
| Band | 11p15.4 | End | 5,324,297 bp |

Gene location (Mouse)
| Chr. | Chromosome 7 (mouse) |
| Band | 7|7 E3 | Start | 103,538,692 bp |
| Band | 7|7 E3 | End | 103,543,692 bp |
RNA expression pattern
| Bgee | Human / Mouse (ortholog); Top expressed in: tibialis anterior muscle; pancreatic ductal cell; mucosa of ileum; deltoid muscle; skin of thigh; Achilles tendon; lower lobe of lung / Top expressed in: submandibular gland; sternocleidomastoid muscle; temporal muscle; tibialis anterior muscle; vastus lateralis muscle; median eminence; More reference expression data |
| BioGPS | n/a |
Gene ontology
| Molecular function | G protein-coupled receptor activity; olfactory receptor activity; signal transducer activity |
| Cellular component | integral component of membrane; plasma membrane; membrane |
| Biological process | sensory perception of smell; signal transduction; response to stimulus; detection of chemical stimulus involved in sensory perception of smell; G protein-coupled receptor signaling pathway |
Sources:Amigo / QuickGO
Orthologs
| Databases | NCBI: entry; OMA: entry |
| Species | Human | Mouse |
| Entrez | 79345 | 18366 |
| Ensembl | ENSG00000279012 | ENSMUSG00000063615 |
| UniProt | Q9Y5P1 | F8VPZ8 |
| RefSeq (mRNA) | NM_033180 | NM_013617 |
| RefSeq (protein) | NP_149420 | NP_038645 |
| Location (UCSC) | Chr 11: 5.32 – 5.32 Mb | Chr 7: 103.54 – 103.54 Mb |
| PubMed search |
- Wikidata
| View/Edit Human | View/Edit Mouse |

Olfactory receptor 51B2 is a protein that in humans is encoded by the OR51B2 gene.

== Function ==
Olfactory receptors interact with odorant molecules in the nose, to initiate a neuronal response that triggers the perception of a smell. The olfactory receptor proteins are members of a large family of G-protein-coupled receptors (GPCR) arising from single coding-exon genes. Olfactory receptors share a 7-transmembrane domain structure with many neurotransmitter and hormone receptors and are responsible for the recognition and G protein-mediated transduction of odorant signals. The olfactory receptor gene family is the largest in the genome. The nomenclature assigned to the olfactory receptor genes and proteins for this organism is independent of other organisms.

== Ligands ==
As of 2015, OR51B2 was an orphan receptor, meaning that no odorants have been identified which bind to it.

== See also ==
- Olfactory receptor
