= OR1B1 =

Protein-coding gene in the species Homo sapiens

Identifiers
- Aliases: OR1B1, OR9-26, OR9-B, olfactory receptor family 1 subfamily B member 1 (gene/pseudogene), olfactory receptor family 1 subfamily B member 1
- External IDs: MGI: 3030196; GeneCards: OR1B1

Gene location (Human)
Chr.	Chromosome 9 (human)
Band	9q33.2	Start	122,628,579 bp
Band	9q33.2	End	122,629,573 bp

Gene location (Mouse)
Chr.	Chromosome 2 (mouse)
Band	2|2 B	Start	36,991,718 bp
Band	2|2 B	End	37,007,922 bp
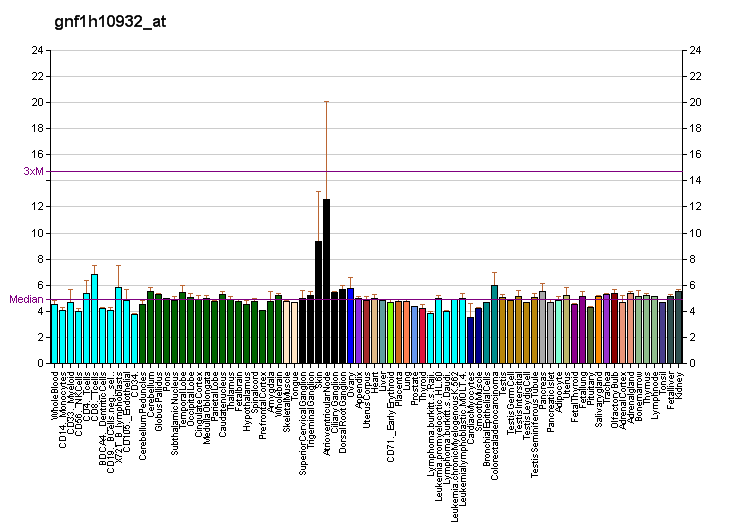
RNA expression pattern
Bgee	Human / Mouse (ortholog); Top expressed in: placenta; endometrium; cervix; lymph node; right lung; gallbladder; superior frontal gyrus; canal of the cervix / Top expressed in: spermatid; testicle; More reference expression data
BioGPS	More reference expression data
Gene ontology
Molecular function	G protein-coupled receptor activity; signal transducer activity; transmembrane signaling receptor activity; olfactory receptor activity
Cellular component	integral component of membrane; plasma membrane; membrane
Biological process	sensory perception of smell; signal transduction; response to stimulus; detection of chemical stimulus involved in sensory perception of smell; detection of chemical stimulus involved in sensory perception; G protein-coupled receptor signaling pathway
Sources:Amigo / QuickGO
Orthologs
Databases	NCBI: entry; OMA: entry
Species	Human	Mouse
Entrez	347169	259053
Ensembl	ENSG00000280094	ENSMUSG00000075377
UniProt	Q8NGR6	Q8VGV7
RefSeq (mRNA)	NM_001004450	NM_147051
RefSeq (protein)	NP_001004450	NP_667262
Location (UCSC)	Chr 9: 122.63 – 122.63 Mb	Chr 2: 36.99 – 37.01 Mb
PubMed search
- Wikidata
View/Edit Human	View/Edit Mouse

Olfactory receptor 1B1 is a protein that in humans is encoded by the OR1B1 gene. Olfactory receptors interact with odorant molecules in the nose, to initiate a neuronal response that triggers the perception of a smell. The olfactory receptor proteins are members of a large family of G-protein-coupled receptors (GPCR) arising from single coding-exon genes. Olfactory receptors share a 7-transmembrane domain structure with many neurotransmitter and hormone receptors and are responsible for the recognition and G protein-mediated transduction of odorant signals. The olfactory receptor gene family is the largest in the genome. The nomenclature assigned to the olfactory receptor genes and proteins for this organism is independent of other organisms.

== Ligands ==
As of 2024, OR1B1 was an orphan receptor, meaning that no odorants have been identified which bind to it.

== See also ==
- Olfactory receptor
