= AR-231,453 =

Chemical compound

Identifiers
- IUPAC name: N-(2-fluoro-4-methanesulfonylphenyl)-(6-[4-(3-isopropyl-[1,2,4]oxadiazol-5-yl)-piperidin-1-yl]-5-nitropyrimidin-4-yl)amine
- CAS Number: 733750-99-7
- PubChem CID: 24939268
- IUPHAR/BPS: 5653
- ChemSpider: 23330691
- UNII: 07Z1P4981I
- ChEMBL: ChEMBL461384
- CompTox Dashboard (EPA): DTXSID80223614

Chemical and physical data
- Formula: C_{21}H_{24}FN_{7}O_{5}S
- Molar mass: 505.53 g·mol^{−1}
- 3D model (JSmol): Interactive image
- SMILES: Fc2cc(S(=O)(C)=O)ccc2Nc1ncnc(c1N(=O)=O)N(CC3)CCC3c(n4)onc4C(C)C
- InChI: InChI=1S/C21H24FN7O5S/c1-12(2)18-26-21(34-27-18)13-6-8-28(9-7-13)20-17(29(30)31)19(23-11-24-20)25-16-5-4-14(10-15(16)22)35(3,32)33/h4-5,10-13H,6-9H2,1-3H3,(H,23,24,25); Key:DGBKNTVAKIFYNU-UHFFFAOYSA-N

AR-231,453 is an agonist for the suggested novel cannabinoid receptor GPR119.

== See also ==
- PSN-375,963
- PSN-632,408
