= N-Arachidonylglycine =

Names
- IUPAC name N-[(5Z,8Z,11Z,14Z)-Icosa-5,8,11,14-tetraenoyl]glycine
- Systematic IUPAC name [(5Z,8Z,11Z,14Z)-Icosa-5,8,11,14-tetraenamido]acetic acid
- Other names N-Arachidonylglycine; Arachidonoyl glycine NA-glycine

Identifiers
CAS Number	179113-91-8
3D model (JSmol)	Interactive image; Interactive image
Beilstein Reference	7652004
ChEBI	CHEBI:58961
ChEMBL	ChEMBL161343
ChemSpider	4446510
MeSH	Anandamide
PubChem CID	5283389
UNII	5PB56SQA6E
CompTox Dashboard (EPA)	DTXSID5045124
- InChI: Key: LGEQQWMQCRIYKG-DOFZRALJSA-N; InChI=1/C22H37NO2/c1-2-3-4-5-6-7-8-9-10-11-12-13-14-15-16-17-18-19-22(25)23-20-21-24/h6-7,9-10,12-13,15-16,24H,2-5,8,11,14,17-21H2,1H3,(H,23,25)/b7-6-,10-9-,13-12-,16-15- Key: YLEARPUNMCCKMP-DOFZRALJSA-N; InChI=1S/C22H35NO3/c1-2-3-4-5-6-7-8-9-10-11-12-13-14-15-16-17-18-19-21(24)23-20-22(25)26/h6-7,9-10,12-13,15-16H,2-5,8,11,14,17-20H2,1H3,(H,23,24)(H,25,26)/b7-6-,10-9-,13-12-,16-15-
- SMILES: O=C(NCC(=O)O)CCC\C=C/C\C=C/C\C=C/C\C=C/CCCCC; O=C(NCC(=O)O)CCC\C=C/C\C=C/C\C=C/C\C=C/CCCCC

Properties
Chemical formula	C_{22}H_{35}NO_{3}
Molar mass	361.526 g·mol^{−1}
- Except where otherwise noted, data are given for materials in their standard state (at 25 °C [77 °F], 100 kPa). verify (what is ?) Infobox references

N-Arachidonylglycine (NAGly) is a carboxylic metabolite of the endocannabinoid anandamide (AEA). Since it was first synthesized in 1996, NAGly has been a primary focus of the relatively contemporary field of lipidomics due to its wide range of signaling targets in the brain, the immune system and throughout various other bodily systems. In combination with 2‐arachidonoyl glycerol (2‐AG), NAGly has enabled the identification of a family of lipids often referred to as endocannabinoids. Recently, NAGly has been found to bind to G-protein coupled receptor 18 (GPR18), the putative abnormal cannabidiol receptor. NaGly is an endogenous inhibitor of fatty acid amide hydrolase (FAAH) and thereby increases the ethanolamide endocannabinoids AEA, oleoylethanolamide (OEA) and palmitoylethanolamide (PEA) levels. NaGly is found throughout the body and research on its explicit functions is ongoing.

== Biosynthesis and degradation ==
The biosynthesis and degradation of NaGly is not completely understood. Using biochemical approaches, two proposed pathways include: 1) enzymatic conjugation of arachidonic acid and glycine and 2) the oxidative metabolism of the endogenous cannabinoid anandamide. In support of the former "direct" pathway of arachidonic acid and glycine conjugation and hydrolysis, the secreted enzyme PM20D1 and the intracellular amidase FAAH has been identified as enzymatic regulators of NAGly metabolism in mice.

== Research ==
=== Effects on the nervous system ===
NAGly has been hypothesized to have a neurophysiological function of pain suppression, supported by evidence that it suppresses formalin-induced pain behavior in rats. In particular, peripherally administered NAGly inhibited phase 2 pain behavior, suggesting either a direct suppression of nociceptive afferents on the nerve or an indirect modulation of the afferents' interstitial environment. In either case, these findings hold promise for NAGly as a means of mitigating postoperative or chronic pain. NAGly is also effective in acute pain models, reducing mechanical allodynia and thermal hyperalgesia induced by intraplantar injection of Fruend's complete adjuvant. Similar mechanical allydonia induced by partial ligation of the sciatic nerve was also reduced by NaGly. Other arachidonic acid-amino acid conjugates did not have the same effects and the actions of NaGly were not affected by cannabinoid receptor agonists in either study, suggesting a novel non-cannabinoid receptor mediated approach to alleviate inflammatory pain.

NaGly was shown to be endogenous ligand for the G-protein couple receptor GPR92 along with farnesyl pyrophosphate. In the dorsal root ganglia (DRG), where GPR92 was found to be localized NaGly increased intracellular calcium levels in DRG neurons, indicating a role of NaGly in the sensory nervous system through the activation of GPR92.

=== Effects on the immune system ===
NAGly has been the focus of research on the immune system because of its antinociceptive effects and inhibitory action on components of the immune system. Specifically, it significantly inhibited TNFα and IFNγ production, and it shows potential as a therapeutic treatment for chronic inflammation. Moreover, NAGly has been shown to act as a substrate for cyclooxygenase-2 (COX-2), the enzyme primarily known for producing prostaglandins associated with increases in inflammation and hyperalgesia. In many mammalian tissues that express COX-2, significant levels of NAGly are naturally present, and in these tissues COX-2 selectively metabolizes NAGly prostaglandin (PG) H_{2} glycine and HETE-Gly.

=== Cell migration ===
NAGly has been hypothesized to induce cell migration in BV-2 microglia cells. The same research suggests that this migration occurs through GPR18. This was verified using GPR18 transfected HEK-293 cells. The same migration wasn't witnessed using non-transfected and GPR55 transfected HEK-293. Additionally, tetrahydrocannabinol and NaGly are full agonists at the GPR18 receptors and induce migration in human endometrial HEC-1B cells. Understanding functions of NaGly in such structures provides a promising future in helping treat diseases such as endometriosis.

=== Cellular respiration ===
NAGly powerfully stimulates oxygen consumption in multiple cell lines, including murine C2C12 myoblasts and human HEK293T cells. This respiratory bioactivity of NAGly is by increased uncoupled (state4u) mitochondrial respiration and depends on the presence of fatty acid desaturation. NAGly respiration bioactivity can be also abrogated in the presence of serum albumin, which functions as an NAGly carrier in murine blood plasma.

=== Other targets ===
==== Insulin secretion ====
NaGly was identified as a novel insulin secretagogue and was shown to increase intracellular calcium concentration through stimulation of voltage dependent calcium channels. Additionally, this action was dependent on extracellular glucose level.

==== Additional biochemical interactions ====
NaGly has been shown to inhibit the glycine transporter GLYT2a in a non-competitive fashion with arachidonic acid and secondary messenger systems of GLYT2a, suggesting a novel recognition site for the N-arachidonyl amino acids, especially because other conjugated amino acids had similar effects.
