= GPR119 =

Protein-coding gene in humans

Identifiers
- Aliases: GPR119, GPCR2, G protein-coupled receptor 119
- External IDs: OMIM: 300513; MGI: 2668412; GeneCards: GPR119

Gene location (Human)
Chr.	X chromosome (human)
Band	Xq26.1	Start	130,379,449 bp
Band	Xq26.1	End	130,385,674 bp

Gene location (Mouse)
Chr.	X chromosome (mouse)
Band	X|X A5	Start	47,756,856 bp
Band	X|X A5	End	47,763,355 bp
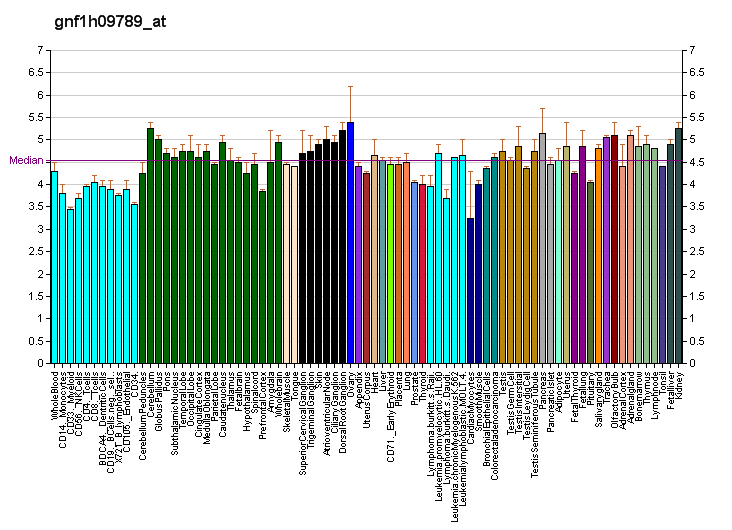
RNA expression pattern
Bgee	Human / Mouse (ortholog); Top expressed in: islet of Langerhans; testicle; duodenum; rectum; body of pancreas; fundus; colon / Top expressed in: embryo; islet of Langerhans; ileum; colon; More reference expression data
BioGPS	More reference expression data
Gene ontology
Molecular function	G protein-coupled receptor activity; signal transducer activity; phosphatidylcholine binding; lipid binding
Cellular component	integral component of membrane; receptor complex; plasma membrane; membrane
Biological process	G protein-coupled receptor signaling pathway; insulin secretion; signal transduction
Sources:Amigo / QuickGO
Orthologs
Databases	NCBI: entry; OMA: entry
Species	Human	Mouse
Entrez	139760	236781
Ensembl	ENSG00000147262	ENSMUSG00000051209
UniProt	Q8TDV5	Q7TQP3
RefSeq (mRNA)	NM_178471	NM_181751
RefSeq (protein)	NP_848566	NP_861416
Location (UCSC)	Chr X: 130.38 – 130.39 Mb	Chr X: 47.76 – 47.76 Mb
PubMed search
- Wikidata
View/Edit Human	View/Edit Mouse

G protein-coupled receptor 119 also known as GPR119 is a G protein-coupled receptor that in humans is encoded by the GPR119 gene.

GPR119, along with GPR55 and GPR18, have been implicated as novel cannabinoid receptors.

== Pharmacology ==
GPR119 is expressed predominantly in the pancreas and gastrointestinal tract in rodents and humans, as well as in the brain in rodents. Activation of the receptor has been shown to cause a reduction in food intake and body weight gain in rats. GPR119 has also been shown to regulate incretin and insulin hormone secretion. As a result, new drugs acting on the receptor have been suggested as novel treatments for obesity and diabetes.

== Ligands ==
A number of endogenous, synthetic and plant derived ligands for this receptor have been identified:

=== Agonists ===
- 2-Oleoylglycerol (2OG)
- Anandamide
- APD668
- AR-231,453
- AS-1269574
- BMS-903452
- Deziglipel (MKP-10241)
- Firuglipel (DS-8500)
- GSK-1292263
- LEZ-763
- MBX-2982 (SAR-260093)
- N-Oleoyldopamine (OLDA)
- Oleoylethanolamide (OEA)
- PRM-914
- PSN-821
- PSN-375,963
- PSN-632,408
- Vanoglipel (DA-1241)
- ZYG-19

== Human microbiota and GPR119 activation ==
Commensal bacteria are found to have important roles in human health, as bacterial metabolites are likely to be key components of host interactions by which they affect mammalian physiology. N-acyl amide synthase genes are found enriched in gastrointestinal bacteria and the lipids, that they encode, interact with GPCRs, which regulate gastrointestinal tract physiology, where cell-based models have demonstrated, that commensal GPR119 agonists regulate metabolic hormones and glucose homeostasis as efficiently as human ligands, and the clearest overlap in structure and function between bacterial and human GPCR-active ligands, is found for the endocannabinoid receptor GPR119.

The experiment have isolated both the palmitoyl and oleoyl analogs of N-acyl serinol, and found the latter only differs from 2-OG: C_{21}H_{40}O_{4} by the presence of an amide instead of an ester, and from OEA: C_{20}H_{39}NO_{2} by the presence of an additional ethanol substituent, where the N-oleoyl serinol (C_{21}H_{41}NO_{3}; 18:1,n-9), is a similarly potent GPR119 agonist compared to the endogenous ligand OEA (EC50 12 μM vs. 7 μM), but elicits almost a 2-fold greater maximum activation, do suggest that chemical mimicry of eukaryotic signalling molecules may be common among commensal bacteria, that communicate through interactions between these two fundamental systems—which form the gut microbiota-endocannabinoidome axis.

== Evolution ==
=== Paralogues ===
- GPR6
- MC5R
- MC3R
- MC4R
- CNR1
- GPR12
- S1PR1
- MC1R
- S1PR3
- S1PR5
- GPR3
- S1PR2
- CNR2
- LPAR3
- LPAR1
- LPAR2
- MC2R
- S1PR4
