= CB25 =

The names CB25 or CB-25 can have different meanings:

- CB-25, a cannabinoid receptor antagonist
- CB25, a CB postcode area district
