= PSN-632,408 =

Chemical compound

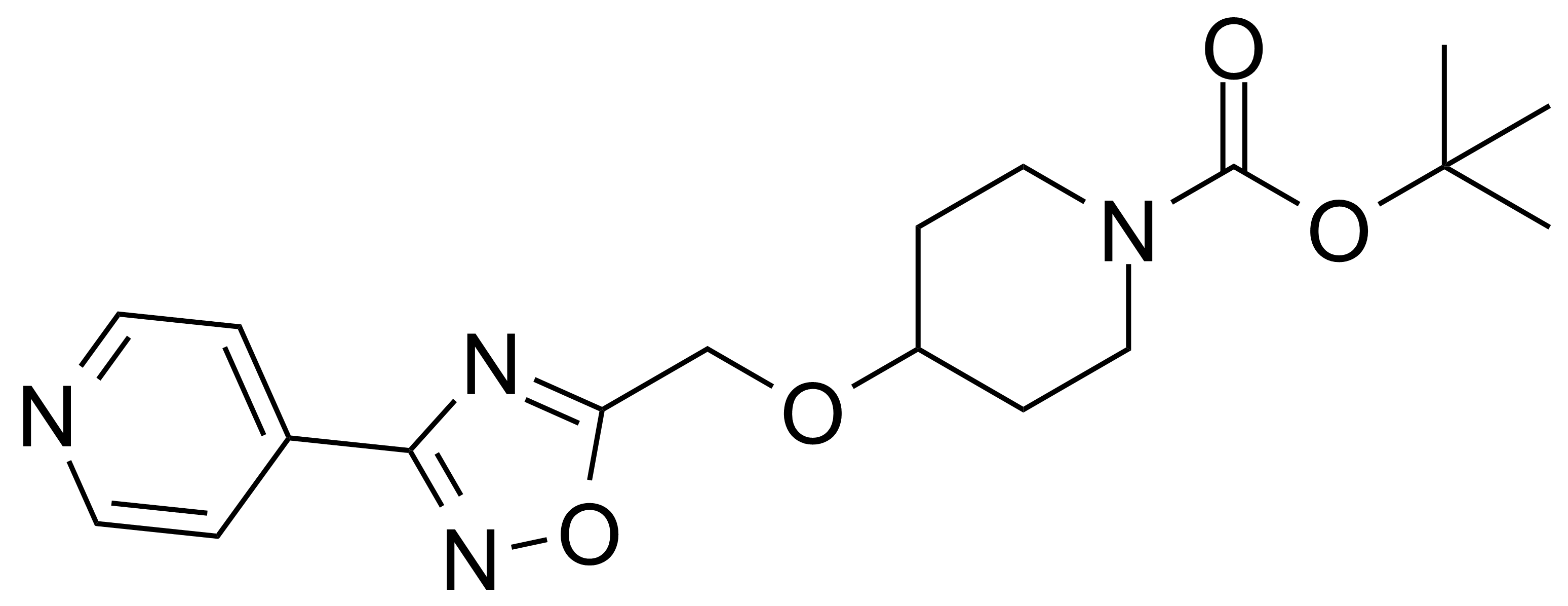

Clinical data
- ATC code: none

Identifiers
- IUPAC name: tert-butyl 4-[(3-pyridin-4-yl-1,2,4-oxadiazol-5-yl)methoxy]piperidine-1-carboxylate
- CAS Number: 857652-30-3
- PubChem CID: 11462546
- IUPHAR/BPS: 3319
- ChemSpider: 9637386
- UNII: V4434XWK2P
- ChEMBL: ChEMBL1081913
- CompTox Dashboard (EPA): DTXSID80466726

Chemical and physical data
- Formula: C_{18}H_{24}N_{4}O_{4}
- Molar mass: 360.414 g·mol^{−1}
- 3D model (JSmol): Interactive image
- SMILES: CC(C)(C)OC(=O)N1CCC(CC1)OCc2nc(no2)-c3ccncc3
- InChI: InChI=1S/C18H24N4O4/c1-18(2,3)25-17(23)22-10-6-14(7-11-22)24-12-15-20-16(21-26-15)13-4-8-19-9-5-13/h4-5,8-9,14H,6-7,10-12H2,1-3H3; Key:LHZWKWCEAXQUMX-UHFFFAOYSA-N

PSN-632,408 is a selective ligand for the suggested novel cannabinoid receptor GPR119.

== See also ==
- AR-231,453
- PSN-375,963
