= MRGPRG =

Protein-coding gene in the species Homo sapiens

Identifiers
- Aliases: MRGPRG, GPR169, MRGG, MAS related GPR family member G
- External IDs: OMIM: 607234; MGI: 3033145; GeneCards: MRGPRG

Gene location (Human)
Chr.	Chromosome 11 (human)
Band	11p15.4	Start	3,217,944 bp
Band	11p15.4	End	3,218,813 bp

Gene location (Mouse)
Chr.	Chromosome 7 (mouse)
Band	7|7 F5	Start	143,317,447 bp
Band	7|7 F5	End	143,320,730 bp
RNA expression pattern
Bgee	Human / Mouse (ortholog); Top expressed in: testicle; left testis; right testis; canal of the cervix / Top expressed in: decidua; white adipose tissue; muscle of thigh; olfactory epithelium; zone of skin; aorta; thymus; skeletal muscle tissue; uterus; esophagus; More reference expression data
BioGPS	n/a
Gene ontology
Molecular function	signal transducer activity; G protein-coupled receptor activity
Cellular component	integral component of membrane; plasma membrane; membrane; integral component of plasma membrane
Biological process	G protein-coupled receptor signaling pathway; signal transduction
Sources:Amigo / QuickGO
Orthologs
Databases	NCBI: entry; OMA: entry
Species	Human	Mouse
Entrez	386746	381974
Ensembl	ENSG00000182170	ENSMUSG00000050276
UniProt	Q86SM5	Q91ZB5
RefSeq (mRNA)	NM_001164377	NM_203492
RefSeq (protein)	NP_001157849	NP_987077
Location (UCSC)	Chr 11: 3.22 – 3.22 Mb	Chr 7: 143.32 – 143.32 Mb
PubMed search
- Wikidata
View/Edit Human	View/Edit Mouse

Mas-related G-protein coupled receptor member G (MRGG) also known as G-protein coupled receptor 169 (GPR169) is a protein that in humans is encoded by the MRGPRG gene. MRGG is an orphan G-protein coupled receptor.
