= Lumír Ondřej Hanuš =

Czech analytic chemist (born 1947)

- לומיר הנוש
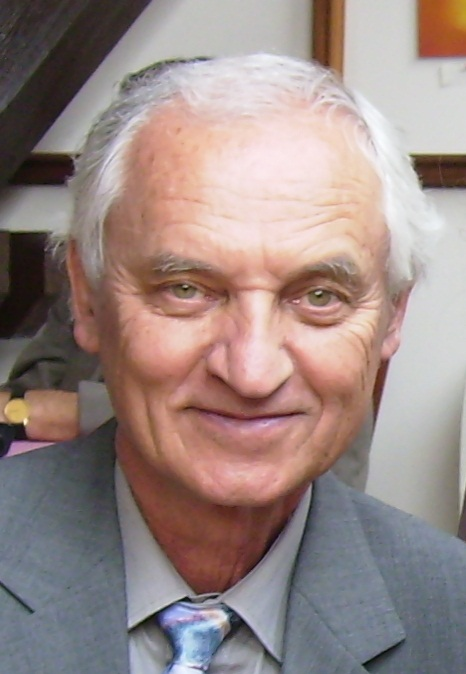
- Born: November 20, 1947 (age 78); Olomouc, Czechoslovakia (today the Czech Republic)
- Education: Palacký University Olomouc
- Known for: Isolation and description of Anandamide
- Awards: 2005 Hanuš Medal; 2006 Memorial Medal; 2007 Doctor honoris causa; 2010 Outstanding Immigrant Scientist; 2011 Doctor honoris causa
- Scientific career
- Fields: Cannabis research, coca leaves research
- Workplaces: Palacký University Olomouc; Hebrew University of Jerusalem

Lumír Ondřej Hanuš (Hebrew: לומיר הנוש) is a Czech analytic chemist and leading authority in the field of cannabis research. In 1992, he and William Anthony Devane isolated and first described the structure of anandamide, an endogenous cannabinoid neurotransmitter.

== Biography ==
Lumír Hanuš was born in 1947 in Olomouc, in what was then Czechoslovakia. He is a distant relative of Czech chemist Josef Hanuš (1872–1955).

== Academic career ==
In 1966, Hanuš began studying at the Faculty of Science of Palacký University Olomouc. In 1970, professor Zdeněk Krejčí of the Faculty of Medicine's Department of Hygiene and Epidemiology (where the anti-bacterial effects of cannabis were described in 1955) needed an aide. Hanuš started to work as Krejčí's assistant in the research of cannabis and hashish in December of that year. There, Hanuš also met professors Jan Kabelík and František Šantavý, who, together with Krejčí, laid the foundations of the research of cannabis and its curative effects. Hanuš grew cannabis for research purposes on two fields in the Research Institute of Vegetable Growing and Breeding in Olomouc from 1971. The extracts were also used at the University Hospital Olomouc as a cure for aphthous ulcer, herpes simplex, herpes zoster, and pressure ulcers.

Hanuš graduated with a Master of Science in 1972 and he earned a Doctorate in Science at Olomouc in 1974. He pursued his academic and research activities there until 1990. Hanuš also took part in research at the Czechoslovak Academy of Sciences and continued post-graduate research study at Jan Evangelista Purkyně University in Brno (today Masaryk University). In years 1978–1979 he worked as a research associate at the University of Mississippi, focusing not only on cannabis, but also on coca leaves. He became associate professor in organic chemistry in Olomouc in 1994 and obtained a Doctorate of Sciences in pharmaceutical chemistry at Charles University in 1995.

Hanuš was for many years in contact with Israeli cannabis researcher Raphael Mechoulam by letter. Following the Velvet Revolution, Hanuš was invited to continue his research at Hebrew University of Jerusalem in Israel. In Israel, Hanuš and American molecular pharmacologist William Anthony Devane in 1992 first described the structure of Anandamide, an endogenous cannabinoid neurotransmitter.

Hanuš continues his research in Jerusalem on cannabinoids, endocannabinoids and their derivatives.

== Views on cannabis ==
Hanuš marks cannabis as "one of the safest known medications".

According to Hanuš, alcohol and tobacco should be "blacklisted" rather than cannabis, as there is a possibility of both physical and psychological addiction to the first two, while there is no possibility of physical, and only limited possibility of psychological addiction to marijuana. Moreover, people under the influence of marijuana are not dangerous to others. He does not support smoking marijuana because of the dangers of smoke inhalation. Hanuš is against uncontrolled use of marijuana, but he fully supports its use for medical purposes.

In April 2010 and September 2011, Hanuš took part in a seminar of the Czech Parliament aimed at introduction of cannabinoid treatment.

== Awards ==
- September 14, 2005: Hanuš Medal (The Czech Chemical Society in Prague) for furthering creditable work in the fields of chemistry.
- November 6, 2006: Memorial Medal (Rector of the Palacký University Olomouc) on the 50th anniversary of the revival and reopening of the university in Olomouc at the occasion of delivering the 13th annual J. L. Fischer Memorial Lecture
- April 12, 2007: Doctor honoris causa (Masaryk University in Brno)
- 2009: nominated for the National Award of the Czech Government "Czech Mind" ("Česká hlava")
- 2010: nominated for the Patria Award of the Czech Government "Czech Mind" ("Česká hlava")
- 2010: nominated for The 2010 Jack Herer Award for Outstanding Hemp Awareness in the field of Medicine
- April 26, 2010: Outstanding Immigrant Scientist (1990–2010) for his contribution to the State of Israel, Ministry of Immigrant Absorption, Israel
- May 4, 2011: Doctor honoris causa (Palacký University Olomouc)
- 2011: Honorary Scientific Fellow of the Czech Neuropsychopharmacological Society
- 2011: nominated for the Addictology award for best achievement in the year 2011
- November 22, 2012: Addictology Award (Charles University, Prague) for significant contribution in the field of addictology in the past year
- June 13, 2013: Olomouc City Award for the year 2012
- March 29, 2014: Recognition (ONEJ), Ljubljana, Slovenia
- 2014: nominated for the position of The International Cannabinoid Research Society President
- March 22, 2016: 2015 Lifetime Award Winner (Americans for Safe Access), Washington D.C., USA
- September 10, 2016: Commemorative Medal of the Palacky University in Olomouc for extraordinary representation of Palacky University in the Czech Republic and abroad (Pamětní medaile Univerzity Palackého v Olomouci za mimořádnou reprezentaci Univerzity Palackého v České republice a v zahraničí)
- January 13, 2018: Recognition, Punta del Este, Uruguay
- September 27, 2018: Lifetime Achievement Award, CanEx Jamaica, Montego Bay, Jamaica

== See also ==
- Anandamide
- 2-Arachidonyl glyceryl ether
- Medical cannabis
