= PSB-KK1415 =

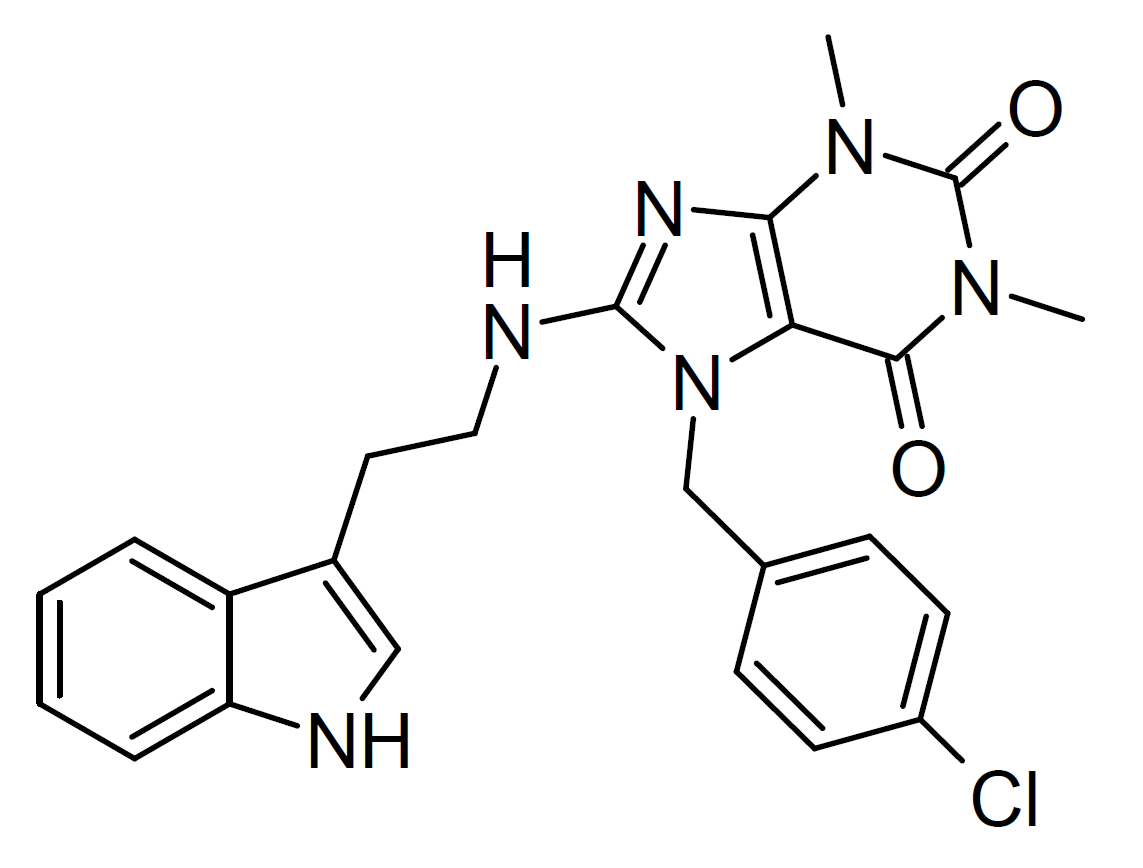

Identifiers
- IUPAC name: 7-[(4-chlorophenyl)methyl]-8-[2-(1H-indol-3-yl)ethylamino]-1,3-dimethylpurine-2,6-dione
- CAS Number: 885896-26-4
- PubChem CID: 4874764
- ChemSpider: 4059043

Chemical and physical data
- Formula: C_{24}H_{23}ClN_{6}O_{2}
- Molar mass: 462.94 g·mol^{−1}
- 3D model (JSmol): Interactive image
- SMILES: CN1C2=C(C(=O)N(C1=O)C)N(C(=N2)NCCC3=CNC4=CC=CC=C43)CC5=CC=C(C=C5)Cl
- InChI: InChI=1S/C24H23ClN6O2/c1-29-21-20(22(32)30(2)24(29)33)31(14-15-7-9-17(25)10-8-15)23(28-21)26-12-11-16-13-27-19-6-4-3-5-18(16)19/h3-10,13,27H,11-12,14H2,1-2H3,(H,26,28); Key:FHFDQEPXKZVEOI-UHFFFAOYSA-N

PSB-KK1415 is an experimental drug that acts as a potent and selective agonist for the cannabinoid-like NAGly receptor, also known as GPR18. It has potential applications in studying the immune system and development of cancer.
