= Firuglipel =

Clinical data
- Other names: DS-8500; DS8500; DS-8500a; DS8500a
- Routes of administration: Oral
- Drug class: GPR119 agonist; Antihyperglycemic agent
- ATC code: None

Identifiers
- IUPAC name: 4-[5-[(1R)-1-[4-(cyclopropanecarbonyl)phenoxy]propyl]-1,2,4-oxadiazol-3-yl]-2-fluoro-N-[(2R)-1-hydroxypropan-2-yl]benzamide
- CAS Number: 1371591-51-3
- PubChem CID: 56959560
- DrugBank: DB19506
- ChemSpider: 59718645
- UNII: 08P99TX229
- ChEMBL: ChEMBL5314955

Chemical and physical data
- Formula: C_{25}H_{26}FN_{3}O_{5}
- Molar mass: 467.497 g·mol^{−1}
- 3D model (JSmol): Interactive image
- SMILES: CC[C@H](C1=NC(=NO1)C2=CC(=C(C=C2)C(=O)N[C@H](C)CO)F)OC3=CC=C(C=C3)C(=O)C4CC4
- InChI: InChI=1S/C25H26FN3O5/c1-3-21(33-18-9-6-16(7-10-18)22(31)15-4-5-15)25-28-23(29-34-25)17-8-11-19(20(26)12-17)24(32)27-14(2)13-30/h6-12,14-15,21,30H,3-5,13H2,1-2H3,(H,27,32)/t14-,21-/m1/s1; Key:LRXRIKVDAVVQCP-SPLOXXLWSA-N

Firuglipel (INN; developmental code name DS-8500 or DS-8500a) is a GPR119 agonist with antihyperglycemic actions which was under development for the treatment of type 2 diabetes but was never marketed. It is taken orally. Through activation of the GPR119, the drug has been found to increase glucagon-like peptide 1 (GLP-1) secretion and glucose-stimulated insulin secretion and to lower glucose levels in the glucose tolerance test without altering fasting glucose levels in rodents. Firuglipel was under development by Daiichi Sankyo Company. It reached phase 2 clinical trials prior to the discontinuation of its development in 2021.

== See also ==
- GPR119 § Agonists
