= PSN-375,963 =

Chemical compound

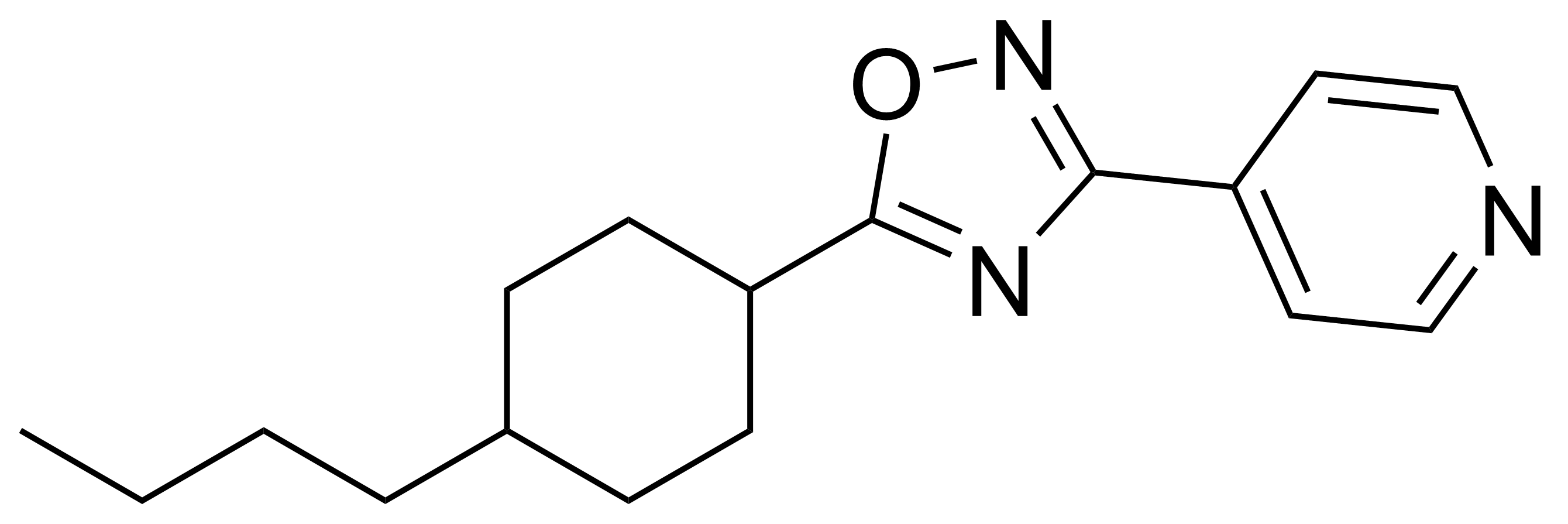

Clinical data
- ATC code: none

Identifiers
- IUPAC name: 5-(4-butylcyclohexyl)-3-pyridin-4-yl-1,2,4-oxadiazole
- CAS Number: 388575-52-8
- PubChem CID: 2875918
- IUPHAR/BPS: 3318
- UNII: C9M28M425E
- CompTox Dashboard (EPA): DTXSID201028459

Chemical and physical data
- Formula: C_{17}H_{23}N_{3}O
- Molar mass: 285.391 g·mol^{−1}
- 3D model (JSmol): Interactive image
- SMILES: C3CC(CCCC)CCC3c(on1)nc1-c2ccncc2

PSN-375,963 is a selective ligand for the suggested novel cannabinoid receptor GPR119.

== See also ==
- AR-231,453
- PSN-632,408
