= O-1918 =

Chemical compound

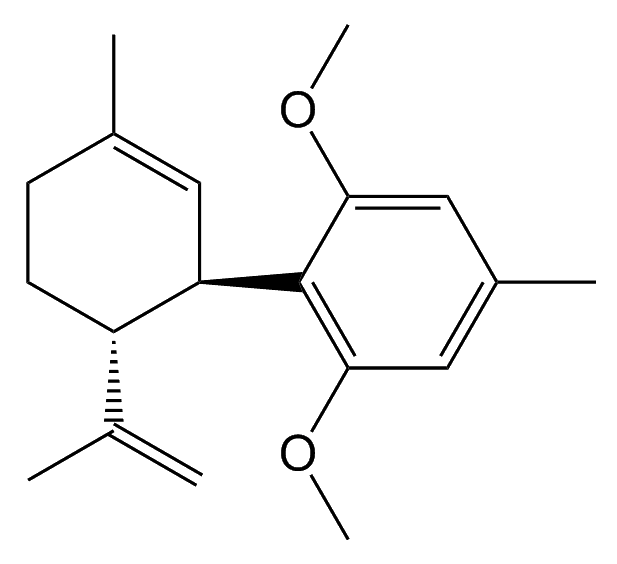

Identifiers
- IUPAC name: 1,3-dimethoxy-5-methyl-2-[(1R,6R)-3-methyl-6-prop-1-en-2-ylcyclohex-2-en-1-yl]benzene
- CAS Number: 536697-79-7
- PubChem CID: 40469923
- UNII: 2DGR9Z5BT3
- CompTox Dashboard (EPA): DTXSID10610371

Chemical and physical data
- Formula: C_{19}H_{26}O_{2}
- Molar mass: 286.415 g·mol^{−1}
- 3D model (JSmol): Interactive image
- SMILES: CC1=C[C@@H](C2=C(OC)C=C(C)C=C2OC)[C@H](C(C)=C)CC1

O-1918 is a synthetic compound related to cannabidiol, which is an antagonist at two former orphan receptors GPR18 and GPR55, that appear to be related to the cannabinoid receptors. O-1918 is used in the study of these receptors, which have been found to be targets for a number of endogenous and synthetic cannabinoid compounds, and are thought to be responsible for most of the non-CB_{1}, non-CB_{2} mediated effects that have become evident in the course of cannabinoid research.

Subsequent research by using electrophysiological approach has shown that O-1918 is a potent BKCa channel inhibitor.

== See also ==
- Abnormal cannabidiol
- Cannabidiol dimethyl ether
- CID-16020046
- CID-85469571
- O-1602
- O-1821
- Tetrahydrocannabiorcol
