= N-Acylamides =

Class of endogenous fatty acid compounds

N-acyl amides are a general class of endogenous fatty acid compounds characterized by a fatty acyl group linked to a primary amine metabolite by an amide bond. Broadly speaking, N-acyl amides fall into several categories: amino acid conjugates (e.g., N-arachidonoyl-glycine), neurotransmitter conjugates (e.g., N-arachidonoyl-serotonin), ethanolamine conjugates (e.g., anandamide), and taurine conjugates (e.g., N-palmitoyl-taurine). N-acyl amides have pleiotropic signaling functions in physiology, including in cardiovascular function, metabolic homeostasis, memory, cognition, pain, motor control and others. Initial attention focused on N-acyl amides present in mammalian organisms, however recently lipid signaling systems consisting of N-acyl amides have also been found to be present in invertebrates, such as Drosophila melanogaster. N-acyl amides play important roles in many biochemical pathways involved in a variety of physiological and pathological processes, as well as the metabolic enzymes, transporters, and receptors that regulate their signaling.

== Compounds ==
| Class | Common name |
|---|---|
| 2-acyl glycerols | 2-oleoyl glycerol ^{†} ^{#} |
| | 2-linoleoyl glycerol ^{†} ^{#} ^{*} |
| | 2-arachidonoyl glycerol ^{†} |
| N-acyl alanine | N-palmitoyl alanine ^{†} ^{#} |
| | N-stearoyl alanine ^{†} ^{#} |
| | N-oleoyl alanine ^{†} ^{#} |
| | N-linoleoyl alanine ^{#} |
| | N-arachidonoyl alanine ^{†} |
| | N-docosahexaenoyl alanine ^{†} |
| N-acyl ethanolamine | N-lauroylethanolamine ^{*} |
| | N-myristoylethanolamine ^{*} |
| | N-palmitoyl ethanolamine ^{†} ^{#} ^{*} |
| | N-stearoyl ethanolamine ^{†} ^{#} |
| | N-oleoyl ethanolamine ^{†} ^{#} |
| | N-linoleoyl ethanolamine ^{†} ^{#} |
| | N-arachidonoyl ethanolamine ^{†} |
| | N-docosahexaenoyl ethanolamine ^{†} |
| N-acyl dopamine | N-palmitoyl dopamine ^{†} |
| | N-stearoyl dopamine ^{†} |
| | N-oleoyl dopamine ^{†} |
| | N-arachidonoyl dopamine ^{†} |
| N-acyl GABA | N-palmitoyl GABA ^{†} |
| | N-stearoyl GABA ^{†} |
| | N-oleoyl GABA ^{†} ^{#} |
| | N-linoleoyl GABA ^{#} |
| | N-arachidonoyl GABA ^{†} |
| | N-docosahexaenoyl GABA ^{†} |
| N-acyl glycine | N-palmitoyl glycine ^{†} ^{#} |
| | N-stearoyl glycine ^{†} ^{#} |
| | N-oleoyl glycine ^{†} ^{#} |
| | N-linoleoyl glycine ^{†} ^{#} |
| | N-arachidonoyl glycine ^{†} |
| | N-docosahexaenoyl glycine ^{†} |
| N-acyl leucine | N-palmitoyl leucine ^{†} ^{#} |
| | N-stearoyl leucine ^{#} |
| | N-oleoyl leucine ^{†} ^{#} |
| | N-linoleoyl leucine ^{#} |
| | N-docosahexaenoyl leucine ^{†} |
| N-acyl methionine | N-palmitoyl methionine ^{†} ^{#} |
| | N-stearoyl methionine ^{†} |
| | N-oleoyl methionine ^{†} ^{#} |
| | N-linoleoyl methionine ^{#} |
| | N-arachidonoyl methionine ^{†} |
| | N-docosahexaenoyl methionine ^{†} |
| N-acyl phenylalanine | N-palmitoyl phenylalanine ^{†} ^{#} |
| | N-stearoyl phenylalanine ^{†} ^{#} |
| | N-oleoyl phenylalanine ^{†} ^{#} |
| | N-linoleoyl phenylalanine ^{#} |
| | N-arachidonoyl phenylalanine ^{†} |
| | N-docosahexaenoyl phenylalanine ^{†} |
| N-acyl proline | N-palmitoyl proline ^{†} ^{#} |
| | N-stearoyl proline ^{†} ^{#} |
| | N-oleoyl proline ^{†} ^{#} |
| | N-linoleoyl proline ^{#} |
| | N-arachidonoyl proline ^{†} |
| | N-docosahexaenoyl proline ^{†} |
| N-acyl serotonin | N-palmitoyl serotonin ^{†} |
| | N-stearoyl serotonin ^{†} |
| | N-oleoyl serotonin ^{†} |
| | N-eicosapentaenoyl serotonin ^{†} |
| | N-arachidonoyl serotonin ^{†} |
| | N-docosahexaenoyl serotonin ^{†} |
| N-acyl serine | N-palmitoyl serine ^{†} ^{#} |
| | N-stearoyl serine ^{†} ^{#} |
| | N-oleoyl serine ^{†} ^{#} |
| | N-linoleoyl serine ^{#} |
| | N-arachidonoyl serine ^{†} |
| | N-docosahexaenoyl serine ^{†} |
| N-acyl taurine | N-palmitoyl taurine ^{†} |
| | N-stearoyl taurine ^{†} |
| | N-arachidonoyl taurine ^{†} |
| N-acyl tryptophan | N-palmitoyl tryptophan ^{†} ^{#} |
| | N-stearoyl tryptophan ^{†} ^{#} |
| | N-oleoyl tryptophan ^{†} ^{#} |
| | N-linoleoyl tryptophan ^{#} |
| | N-arachidonoyl tryptophan ^{†} |
| | N-docosahexaenoyl tryptophan ^{†} |
| N-acyl tyrosine | N-palmitoyl tyrosine ^{†} ^{#} |
| | N-stearoyl tyrosine ^{†} ^{#} |
| | N-oleoyl tyrosine ^{†} ^{#} |
| | N-linoleoyl tyrosine ^{#} |
| | N-arachidonoyl tyrosine ^{†} |
| | N-docosahexaenoyl tyrosine ^{†} |
| N-acyl valine | N-palmitoyl valine ^{†} ^{#} |
| | N-stearoyl valine ^{†} ^{#} |
| | N-oleoyl valine ^{†} ^{#} |
| | N-nervonoyl valine ^{†} |
| | N-linoleoyl valine ^{#} |
| | N-docosahexaenoyl valine ^{†} |

†-Compound found in mammalian species

#-Compound found in invertebrate (Drosophila melanogaster) species

*-Compound found in plant species

== Enzymatic biosynthesis and degradation ==
The enzymatic biosynthesis of the N-acyl amide class of metabolites is a topic of active research with various pathways being discovered for specific N-acyl amides. For example, a proposed biosynthetic pathway for the N-acyl ethanolamines (NAEs) has been the hydrolysis of an unusual phospholipid precursor, N-acyl-phosphatidylethanolamine (NAPE), by a phospholipase D activity to liberate NAE and, as a byproduct, phosphatidic acid. Mice deficient in the enzyme NAPE-PLD show decreased in a subset of brain NAEs, providing genetic evidence for this proposal, at least for a subset of the NAEs. Other biosynthetic pathways do exist and are currently being elucidated. Two possible alternative routes are via lysoNAPE or phosphate-NAE.

The degradation of NAEs in vivo is largely mediated by an enzyme called fatty acid amide hydrolase (FAAH), which catalyzes the hydrolysis of NAEs into fatty acids and ethanolamine. Mice deficient in FAAH show complete loss of NAE degradation activity in tissues and dramatic elevations in tissue levels of NAEs.

FAAH also mediates the degradation of a separate class of N-acyl amides, the N-acyl taurines (NATs). FAAH knockout mice also show dramatic increases in tissue and blood NATs. The enzymatic biosynthesis of NATs remains unknown.

A distinct circulating enzyme, peptidase M20 domain containing 1 (PM20D1), can catalyze the bidirectional the condensation and hydrolysis of a variety of N-acyl amino acids in vitro. In vivo, PM20D1 overexpression increases the levels of various N-acyl amino acids in blood, demonstrating that this enzyme can contribute to N-acyl amino acid biosynthesis. PM20D1 knockout mice have complete loss of N-acyl amino acid hydrolysis activity in blood and tissues with concomitant bidirectional dysregulation of endogenous N-acyl amino acids.

== Biological activity ==
N-acyl amides have been shown to play an important role in a variety of physiological functions as lipid signaling molecule. Apart from the aforementioned roles in cardiovascular function, memory, cognition, pain, and motor control, the compounds have also been shown to play a role in cell migration, inflammation and certain pathological conditions such as diabetes, cancer, neurodegenerative disease, and obesity.

In a more general sense, one of the key characteristics of the N-acyl amide group of compounds is their ubiquitous nature. Research has shown the presence of the compounds in mice, Drosophila melanogaster, Arabidopsis, C. Elegans, Cerevisiae (yeast), Pseudomonas Syringae, olive oil and PYD media . This diverse presence of N-acyl amides attests to their importance in multiple biological systems and also shows that the detected presence of specific N-acyl amides in a number of species, including humans, may be endogenous or exogenous.

N-acyl amides are primarily involved in cell-to-cell communication in biological systems. An example of this is the lipid signaling system involving transient receptor potential channels (TRP), which interact with N-acyl amides such as N-arachidonoyl ethanolamide (Anandamide), N-arachidonoyl dopamine and others in an opportunistic fashion. This signaling system has been shown to play a role in the physiological processes involved in inflammation. Other N-acyl amides, including N-oleoyl-glutamine, have also been characterized as TRP channel antagonists.

An application of N-acyl amides that is currently at the forefront of related research is the correlation between oleoyl serine and bone remodeling. Recent research has shown that oleoyl serine, an N-acyl amide found in olive oil amongst other sources, plays a role in the proliferation of osteoblast activity and the inhibition of osteoclast activity. Further research regarding this application of oleoyl serine is set to take place to explore the possible correlation between the consumption of the compound by individuals at risk for osteoporosis.

Certain N-acyl amino acids can act as chemical uncouplers and directly stimulate mitochondrial respiration. These N-acyl amino acids are characterized by medium chain, unsaturated fatty acyl chains and neutral amino acid head groups. Administration of these N-acyl amino acids to mice elevates energy expenditure leading to profound body weight loss and improvement of glucose homeostasis.

Overall, the applications of N-acyl amides in biological settings are abundant. As mentioned, their importance in cell signaling in a variety systems leading to various physiological roles and in turn therapeutic capabilities, which gives all the more reason to continue the extensive research being conducted on the compounds today.

Several N-acyl amides have been demonstrated to physiologically activate G-protein coupled receptors. Anandamide activates the cannabinoid receptors CB1 and CB2. FAAH knockout mice show increased anandamide levels in vivo and cannabinoid-receptor dependent behaviors including antinociception and anxiolysis. GPR18, GPR55, GPR92 have also been proposed to be activated by various N-acyl amides, though the physiological relevance of these assignments remains unknown.
