= Deziglipel =

Clinical data
- Other names: MKP10241; MKP-10241
- Routes of administration: Oral
- Drug class: GPR119 agonist; Antihyperglycemic agent

Identifiers
- IUPAC name: 2-[(1S)-1-[1-(5-ethylpyrimidin-2-yl)piperidin-4-yl]ethoxy]-6-(2-fluoro-4-methylsulfonylphenyl)imidazo[2,1-b][1,3,4]thiadiazole
- CAS Number: 2137977-29-6
- PubChem CID: 131984581
- ChemSpider: 138497087
- UNII: 9N7Y669B85

Chemical and physical data
- Formula: C_{24}H_{27}FN_{6}O_{3}S_{2}
- Molar mass: 530.64 g·mol^{−1}
- 3D model (JSmol): Interactive image
- SMILES: CCC1=CN=C(N=C1)N2CCC(CC2)[C@H](C)OC3=NN4C=C(N=C4S3)C5=C(C=C(C=C5)S(=O)(=O)C)F
- InChI: InChI=1S/C24H27FN6O3S2/c1-4-16-12-26-22(27-13-16)30-9-7-17(8-10-30)15(2)34-24-29-31-14-21(28-23(31)35-24)19-6-5-18(11-20(19)25)36(3,32)33/h5-6,11-15,17H,4,7-10H2,1-3H3/t15-/m0/s1; Key:UUMBXZTUKTTYMG-HNNXBMFYSA-N

Deziglipel (INN; developmental code name MKP10241) is a GPR119 agonist with antihyperglycemic actions which is under development for the treatment of obesity and type 2 diabetes. It is taken orally. The drug has been found to reduce glucose levels and HbA1c in rodents, including in models of diabetes. In addition, it markedly reduced feed intake and body weight in such rodents. The drug also reduced metabolic dysfunction–associated steatotic liver disease (MASLD) in a rodent model of the disease. Deziglipel is under development by Mankind Pharma. As of November 2025, it is in phase 2 clinical trials for both obesity and type 2 diabetes.

== See also ==
- GPR119 § Agonists
