= PSB-KD107 =

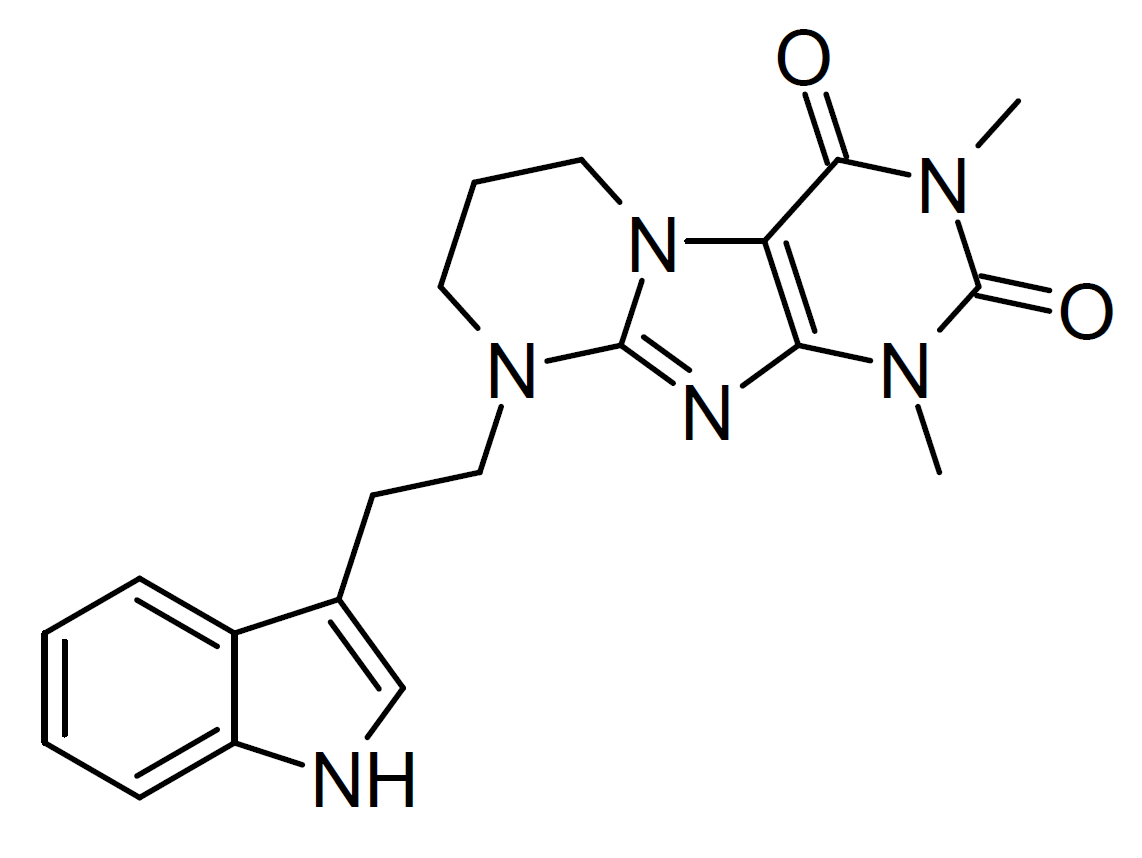

Identifiers
- IUPAC name: 9-[2-(1H-indol-3-yl)ethyl]-1,3-dimethyl-7,8-dihydro-6H-purino[7,8-a]pyrimidine-2,4-dione
- CAS Number: 955121-65-0
- PubChem CID: 44437220
- IUPHAR/BPS: 11081
- ChemSpider: 23301412
- ChEMBL: ChEMBL239232

Chemical and physical data
- Formula: C_{20}H_{22}N_{6}O_{2}
- Molar mass: 378.436 g·mol^{−1}
- 3D model (JSmol): Interactive image
- SMILES: CN1C2=C(C(=O)N(C1=O)C)N3CCCN(C3=N2)CCC4=CNC5=CC=CC=C54
- InChI: InChI=1S/C20H22N6O2/c1-23-17-16(18(27)24(2)20(23)28)26-10-5-9-25(19(26)22-17)11-8-13-12-21-15-7-4-3-6-14(13)15/h3-4,6-7,12,21H,5,8-11H2,1-2H3; Key:PUJKERUFRDZALE-UHFFFAOYSA-N

PSB-KD107 is an experimental drug that acts as a potent and selective agonist for the cannabinoid-like NAGly receptor, also known as GPR18. It has antiinflammatory effects, and has been studied in an animal model of Duchenne muscular dystrophy.
