= Vanoglipel =

Chemical compound

Clinical data
- Other names: DA-1241; DA1241
- Drug class: GPR119 agonist

Identifiers
- IUPAC name: 3-[4-[3-[1-(5-Ethylpyrimidin-2-yl)piperidin-4-yl]propoxy]-2,6-difluorophenyl]-5-propan-2-yl-1,2,4-oxadiazole
- CAS Number: 1914136-10-9
- PubChem CID: 121304331
- ChemSpider: 130744790
- UNII: 6380I4YM3Q
- KEGG: D13209

Chemical and physical data
- Formula: C_{25}H_{31}F_{2}N_{5}O_{2}
- Molar mass: 471.553 g·mol^{−1}
- 3D model (JSmol): Interactive image
- SMILES: CCC1=CN=C(N=C1)N1CCC(CCCOC2=CC(F)=C(C3=NOC(=N3)C(C)C)C(F)=C2)CC1
- InChI: InChI=1S/C25H31F2N5O2/c1-4-17-14-28-25(29-15-17)32-9-7-18(8-10-32)6-5-11-33-19-12-20(26)22(21(27)13-19)23-30-24(16(2)3)34-31-23/h12-16,18H,4-11H2,1-3H3; Key:XQSZLXRXPGLHLH-UHFFFAOYSA-N

Vanoglipel (INN), also known by its developmental code name DA-1241, is an experimental GPR119 receptor agonist developed by the South Korean company Dong-A ST for non-alcoholic steatohepatitis and type 2 diabetes. As of August 2026, it is in phase 2 clinical trials for non-alcoholic steatohepatitis and phase 1 trials for type 2 diabetes.

== See also ==
- GPR119 § Agonists
