= Depolarization-induced suppression of inhibition =

Physiological example of endocannabinoid function in the central nervous system

Depolarization-induced suppression of inhibition is the classical and original electrophysiological example of endocannabinoid function in the central nervous system. Prior to the demonstration that depolarization-induced suppression of inhibition was dependent on the cannabinoid CB1 receptor function, there was no way of producing an in vitro endocannabinoid mediated effect.

Depolarization-induced suppression of inhibition is classically produced in a brain slice experiment (i.e. a 300-400 μm slice of brain, with intact axons and synapses) where a single neuron is "depolarized" (the normal −70 mV potential across the neuronal membrane is reduced, usually to −30 to 0 mV) for a period of 1 to 10 seconds. After the depolarization, inhibitory GABA mediated neurotransmission is reduced. This has been demonstrated to be caused by the release of endogenous cannabinoids from the depolarized neuron which diffuses to nearby neurons, and binds and activates CB1 receptors, which act presynaptically to reduce neurotransmitter release.

== History ==
Depolarization-induced suppression of inhibition was discovered in 1992 by Vincent et al., (1992) working in purkinje cells of the cerebellum then confirmed in the hippocampus by Pitler & Alger, 1992.

These groups were studying the responses of large pyramidal projection neurons to GABA, the main inhibitory neurotransmitter in the central nervous system. GABA is typically released by small interneurons in many regions of the brain, where its job is to inhibit the activity of primary neurons, such as the CA1 pyramidal neurons of the hippocampus or the Purkinje cells of the cerebellum. Activation of GABA receptors on these cells, whether they are ionotropic or metabotropic, typically results in the influx of chloride ions into that target cell. This build-up of negative charge from the chloride ions results in the hyperpolarization of the target cell, making it less likely to fire an action potential. Accordingly, any ionic current that hyperpolarizes a cell is called an inhibitory current.

In their experiments with projection neurons in the hippocampus and cerebellum, both groups noticed that a train of action potentials in these cells resulted in a temporary reduction in inhibitory currents caused by GABA-ergic interneurons. Since this reduction of inhibitory currents could be invoked simply by depolarization of the target cell, this phenomenon was termed depolarization-induced suppression of inhibition. While initially discovered in CA1 neurons of the hippocampus and Purkinje cells in the cerebellum, depolarization-induced suppression of inhibition is a pretty ubiquitous phenomenon and has been demonstrated in other areas of the brain such as the basal ganglia, the cortex, the amygdala, and the hypothalamus (Katona et al. 2001, Jo et al. 2005, Bodor et al. 2005, Matyas et al. 2006)

== Depolarization-induced suppression of inhibition mediation by endocannabinoids ==
Depolarization-induced suppression of inhibition was thought to be due to a reduction in presynaptic neurotransmitter release for 2 reasons:

1. The magnitudes of spontaneously evoked inhibitory postsynaptic currents (IPSCs), caused by the release of a single presynaptic vesicle filled with GABA, remained unchanged.
2. The cellular responses to exogenously applied GABA remained the same.

These observations suggested that no changes occurred in the post-synaptic cell to change its responsiveness to GABA during depolarization-induced suppression of inhibition. Somehow, depolarization-induced suppression of inhibition appeared to be mediated by a retrograde synaptic messenger whose synthesis or release was stimulated by the depolarization of the target cell. This messenger then diffused "backwards" to the pre-synaptic cell, where it caused a reduction in neurotransmitter release.

The chemical messengers presumed to be responsible for mediating depolarization-induced suppression of inhibition was discovered by three separate groups in 2001. Wilson & Nicoll (2001) published their work in the prestigious journal, Nature, while the other two groups, Kreitzer & Regehr (2001) and Ohno-Shosaku et al. (2001), published in the same issue of another reputable journal, Neuron.

All three demonstrated heavy involvement of the CB1 cannabinoid receptor in depolarization-induced suppression of inhibition, suggesting that the endocannabinoids were the brain's mediators of depolarization-induced suppression of inhibition. They showed that cannabinoid receptor agonists, drugs that mimic the actions of endocannabinoids or THC, could evoke the same reduction in inhibitory currents caused by depolarization-induced suppression of inhibition. They also demonstrated that depolarization-induced suppression of inhibition could be prevented by cannabinoid receptor antagonists, drugs that block the actions of cannabinoid compounds.

Other lines of evidence support the role of the CB1 receptor in depolarization-induced suppression of inhibition. This receptor is distributed very widely throughout the brain, covering all areas where depolarization-induced suppression of inhibition has been observed (Herkenham et al. 1990). The CB1 receptor also appears to be expressed mainly on GABA-ergic pre-synaptic terminals, making it an excellent candidate for mediating depolarization-induced suppression of inhibition (Matyas et al. 2006, Katona et al. 1999). In 2005, other groups began to demonstrate the involvement of the CB1 receptor in DSI in other regions of the brain (Jo et al. 2005, Bodor et al. 2005). Lastly, depolarization-induced suppression of inhibition research was finally applied to mice that had the CB1 receptor genetically "knocked-out". So far, these knock-out mice are not known to exhibit DSI in any regions of the brain, suggesting that the CB1 receptor is the crucial mediator for DSI (Kreitzer & Regehr 2001a, Ohno-Shosaku et al. 2002).

The discovery that depolarization-induced suppression of inhibition is mediated by endocannabinoids finally explained why both the CB1 receptor and the endocannabinoids are both so widely distributed in the brain. Depolarization-induced suppression of inhibition is a very common form of short-term plasticity and thus needs to be mediated by a commonly found neurotransmitter. The use of endocannabinoids such as anandamide and 2-arachidonoylglycerol in this method of signalling is quite logical, since both molecules can be synthesized relatively easily from lipids in the plasma membrane, a fundamental constituent of all cells. Depolarization-induced suppression of inhibition is therefore the primary cortical process mediated by the endocannabinoids, and may contribute to many forms of cortical plasticity and synaptic strengthening, such as in long-term potentiation (Carlson et al. 2002).

== A note on depolarization-induced suppression of excitation ==
While working with the cerebellum, Kreitzer's group also discovered that depolarization of Purkinje cells could also cause a temporary reduction in excitatory input into these cells from both climbing fibres and parallel fibres (Kreitzer et al. 2001b). This phenomenon was termed depolarization-induced suppression of excitation (DSE), and differs from DSI only by the kind of neurotransmitter whose release is reduced. In the case of DSI, the result is a reduction in inhibitory GABA release, while in DSE the effect is a reduction in excitatory glutamate release. DSE was also found to occur in other regions of the brain, however the evidence for the involvement of the endocannabinoid receptor CB1 in this process is not as solid as it is for DSI. Both DSI and DSE have been studied in the CB1 knockout mice. Some groups show that both DSI and DSE are lacking in these mice, while others have shown that DSE, but not DSI, can still be evoked in the knockouts (Ohno-Shosaku et al. 2002, Hajos et al. 2001).

The endocannabinoids may still mediate DSE too, but by acting at a yet unknown cannabinoid receptor. Some work has shown that anandamide can bind to the vanilloid receptor VR1, the receptor responsible for mediating the effects of capsaicin. This receptor is present in the brain, and anandamide actions at this receptor may potentially contribute to DSE (Cristino et al. 2006, Hajos et al. 2002). However DSE is currently a largely unexplored phenomenon and more research is needed to draw any firm conclusions.
