= Lysophosphatidylinositol =

Names
- IUPAC name [(2R)-2-hydroxy-3-[hydroxy-[(2R,3R,5S,6R)-2,3,4,5,6-pentahydroxycyclohexyl]-oxyphosphoryl]oxypropyl] hexadecanoate

Identifiers
CAS Number	796963-91-2
3D model (JSmol)	Interactive image
ChemSpider	59664394
PubChem CID	71296207
- InChI: InChI=1S/C25H49O12P/c1-2-3-4-5-6-7-8-9-10-11-12-13-14-15-19(27)35-16-18(26)17-36-38(33,34)37-25-23(31)21(29)20(28)22(30)24(25)32/h18,20-26,28-32H,2-17H2,1H3,(H,33,34)/t18-,20?,21-,22+,23-,24-,25?/m1/s1 Key: UOXRPRZMAROFPH-IESLQMLBSA-N
- SMILES: CCCCCCCCCCCCCCCC(=O)OC[C@H](COP(=O)(O)OC1[C@@H]([C@H](C([C@H]([C@H]1O)O)O)O)O)O

Properties
Chemical formula	C_{25}H_{49}O_{12}P
Molar mass	572.629 g·mol^{−1}
- Except where otherwise noted, data are given for materials in their standard state (at 25 °C [77 °F], 100 kPa). Infobox references

Lysophosphatidylinositol (LPI, lysoPI), or L-α-lysophosphatidylinositol, is an endogenous lysophospholipid and endocannabinoid neurotransmitter. LPI, along with its 2-arachidonoyl- derivative, 2-arachidonoyl lysophosphatidylinositol (2-ALPI), have been proposed as the endogenous ligands of GPR55. Recent studies have shown that the fatty acyl composition of LPI influences neuroinflammatory responses in primary neuronal cultures, highlighting its potential role in neuroinflammation.

== See also ==
- Phosphatidylinositol
- Cannabinoid receptor
