= PM20D1 =

Protein-coding gene in humans

Identifiers
- Aliases: PM20D1, Cps1, peptidase M20 domain containing 1
- External IDs: OMIM: 617124; MGI: 2442939; GeneCards: PM20D1
Enzyme activity
EC #	BRENDA	ExPASy	KEGG	MetaCyc
3.5.1.14	↗	↗	↗	↗
3.5.1.114	↗	↗	↗	↗

Gene location (Human)
Chr.	Chromosome 1 (human)
Band	1q32.1	Start	205,828,025 bp
Band	1q32.1	End	205,850,132 bp

Gene location (Mouse)
Chr.	Chromosome 1 (mouse)
Band	1|1 E4	Start	131,725,119 bp
Band	1|1 E4	End	131,749,211 bp
RNA expression pattern
Bgee	Human / Mouse (ortholog); Top expressed in: skin of thigh; skin of arm; vulva; body of pancreas; mucosa of ileum; skin of abdomen; granulocyte; nipple; islet of Langerhans; body of stomach / Top expressed in: epithelium of small intestine; left lobe of liver; human kidney; proximal tubule; right kidney; jejunum; transitional epithelium of urinary bladder; intestinal villus; ileum; lumbar subsegment of spinal cord; More reference expression data
BioGPS	n/a
Gene ontology
Molecular function	peptidase activity; hydrolase activity; metal ion binding; hydrolase activity, acting on carbon-nitrogen (but not peptide) bonds, in linear amides; lyase activity
Cellular component	extracellular region; extracellular exosome; extracellular space
Biological process	metabolism; proteolysis; negative regulation of neuron death; cellular amino acid metabolic process; amide biosynthetic process; cellular amide catabolic process; cellular lipid metabolic process; energy homeostasis; adaptive thermogenesis; regulation of oxidative phosphorylation uncoupler activity; nitrogen compound metabolic process
Sources:Amigo / QuickGO
Orthologs
Databases	NCBI: entry; OMA: entry
Species	Human	Mouse
Entrez	148811	212933
Ensembl	ENSG00000162877	ENSMUSG00000042251
UniProt	Q6GTS8	Q8C165
RefSeq (mRNA)	NM_152491	NM_178079; NM_001357478
RefSeq (protein)	NP_689704	NP_835180; NP_001344407
Location (UCSC)	Chr 1: 205.83 – 205.85 Mb	Chr 1: 131.73 – 131.75 Mb
PubMed search
- Wikidata
View/Edit Human	View/Edit Mouse

Peptidase M20 domain containing 1 is a circulating enzyme which in humans is encoded by the PM20D1 gene. PM20D1 regulates bioactive N-acyl amide lipids and has been implicated in obesity, type 2 diabetes, pain, and Alzheimer's disease.

== Function ==
PM20D1 catalyzes the biosynthesis of N-fatty acyl amino acids from free fatty acids and free amino acids. Consequently PM20D1 is involved in the generation of potent bioactive lipid metabolites from two abundant cellular energy precursors.

PM20D1 is involved in energy homeostasis. In mice, PM20D1 is highly expressed and secreted into the blood by brown fat. Its expression in adipose tissues is increased following cold exposure. Genetic elevation of circulating PM20D1 in mice leads to accumulation of multiple circulating N-acyl amino acid species and a hypermetabolic phenotype. Conversely, PM20D1-KO exhibit bidirectional dysregulation of circulating N-acyl amino acids, insulin resistance, and glucose intolerance. Mechanistically, N-fatty acyl amino acids function as UCP1-independent uncouplers of mitochondrial respiration.

PM20D1 has also been implicated in neurological diseases. PM20D1 expression is increased both in vitro and in vivo following neurotoxic insults. Forced overexpression of PM20D1 in the hippocampus results in improved learning performance in a mouse model of Alzheimer's disease whereas PM20D1 knockdown increases amyloid plaque load.

== Clinical significance ==
In human visceral and subcutaneous adipocytes, PM20D1 is one of the most highly up-regulated genes by the anti-diabetic thiazolidinedione drug rosiglitazone, suggesting a potential role for this enzyme and/or N-fatty acyl amino acids in obesity and diabetes.

Methylation at or near the PM20D1 locus has been correlated to body mass index.

In humans, the PM20D1 locus has been associated with Alzheimer's disease.
