= GPR21 =

Protein-coding gene in the species Homo sapiens

Identifiers
- Aliases: GPR21, G protein-coupled receptor 21
- External IDs: OMIM: 601909; MGI: 2441890; GeneCards: GPR21

Gene location (Human)
Chr.	Chromosome 9 (human)
Band	9q33.2	Start	123,033,667 bp
Band	9q33.2	End	123,035,665 bp

Gene location (Mouse)
Chr.	Chromosome 2 (mouse)
Band	2|2 B	Start	37,406,344 bp
Band	2|2 B	End	37,410,615 bp
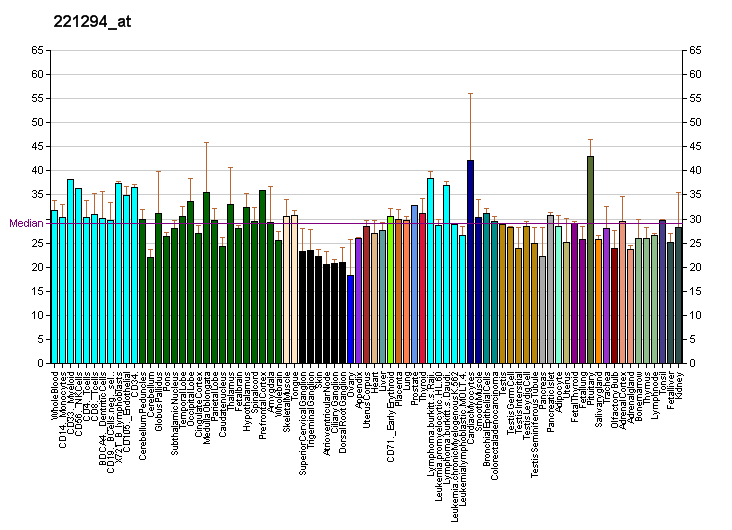
RNA expression pattern
Bgee	Human / Mouse (ortholog); Top expressed in: testicle; right coronary artery; popliteal artery; tibial arteries; left coronary artery; ganglionic eminence; Descending thoracic aorta; prefrontal cortex; ascending aorta; muscle tissue / Top expressed in: ganglionic eminence; mesencephalon; neural tube; embryo; embryo; morula; rhombencephalon; olfactory bulb; tail of embryo; secondary oocyte; More reference expression data
BioGPS	More reference expression data
Gene ontology
Molecular function	dopamine neurotransmitter receptor activity, coupled via Gs; signal transducer activity; G protein-coupled receptor activity
Cellular component	integral component of membrane; plasma membrane; membrane
Biological process	negative regulation of insulin receptor signaling pathway; glucose homeostasis; signal transduction; positive regulation of multicellular organism growth; G protein-coupled receptor signaling pathway; dopamine receptor signaling pathway
Sources:Amigo / QuickGO
Orthologs
Databases	NCBI: entry; OMA: entry
Species	Human	Mouse
Entrez	2844	338346
Ensembl	ENSG00000188394	ENSMUSG00000053164
UniProt	Q99679	Q8BX79
RefSeq (mRNA)	NM_005294	NM_177383
RefSeq (protein)	NP_005285	NP_796357
Location (UCSC)	Chr 9: 123.03 – 123.04 Mb	Chr 2: 37.41 – 37.41 Mb
PubMed search
- Wikidata
View/Edit Human	View/Edit Mouse

Probable G-protein coupled receptor 21 is a protein that in humans is encoded by the GPR21 gene.
