= GPR55 =

Protein-coding gene in the species Homo sapiens

Identifiers
- Aliases: GPR55, LPIR1, G protein-coupled receptor 55
- External IDs: OMIM: 604107; MGI: 2685064; GeneCards: GPR55

Gene location (Human)
Chr.	Chromosome 2 (human)
Band	2q37.1	Start	230,907,318 bp
Band	2q37.1	End	230,961,066 bp

Gene location (Mouse)
Chr.	Chromosome 1 (mouse)
Band	1|1 C5	Start	85,938,318 bp
Band	1|1 C5	End	85,961,007 bp
RNA expression pattern
Bgee	Human / Mouse (ortholog); Top expressed in: monocyte; granulocyte; nucleus accumbens; lymph node; spleen; putamen; caudate nucleus; right testis; appendix; blood / Top expressed in: jejunum; duodenum; ileum; colon; spermatocyte; testicle; adrenal gland; yolk sac; primary oocyte; spleen; More reference expression data
BioGPS	n/a
Gene ontology
Molecular function	cannabinoid receptor activity; G protein-coupled receptor activity; signal transducer activity
Cellular component	integral component of membrane; plasma membrane; integral component of plasma membrane; membrane
Biological process	positive regulation of Rho protein signal transduction; G protein-coupled receptor signaling pathway; activation of phospholipase C activity; bone resorption; negative regulation of osteoclast differentiation; signal transduction; positive regulation of ERK1 and ERK2 cascade; cannabinoid signaling pathway; positive regulation of cytosolic calcium ion concentration involved in phospholipase C-activating G protein-coupled signaling pathway
Sources:Amigo / QuickGO
Orthologs
Databases	NCBI: entry; OMA: entry
Species	Human	Mouse
Entrez	9290	227326
Ensembl	ENSG00000135898	ENSMUSG00000049608
UniProt	Q9Y2T6	Q3UJF0
RefSeq (mRNA)	NM_005683	NM_001033290
RefSeq (protein)	NP_005674	NP_001028462
Location (UCSC)	Chr 2: 230.91 – 230.96 Mb	Chr 1: 85.94 – 85.96 Mb
PubMed search
- Wikidata
View/Edit Human	View/Edit Mouse

G protein-coupled receptor 55 also known as GPR55 is a G protein-coupled receptor that in humans is encoded by the GPR55 gene.

GPR55, along with GPR119 and GPR18, have been implicated as novel cannabinoid receptors.

== History ==
GPR55 was identified and cloned for the first time in 1999. Later it was identified by an in silico screen as a putative cannabinoid receptor because of a similar amino acid sequence in the binding region. Research groups from Glaxo Smith Kline and Astra Zeneca characterized the receptor extensively because it was hoped to be responsible for the blood pressure lowering properties of cannabinoids. GPR55 is indeed activated by endogenous and exogenous cannabinoids such as plant and synthetic cannabinoids but GPR-55 knockout mice generated by a research group from Glaxo Smith Kline showed no altered blood pressure regulation after administration of the cannabidiol-derivative abnormal cannabidiol.

== Signal cascade ==
GPR55 is coupled to the G-protein G_{13} and activation of the receptor leads to stimulation of rhoA, cdc42 and rac1.

== Pharmacology ==
GPR55 is acted on by the phytocannabinoids Δ^{9}-THC and CBD, as well as the endocannabinoids anandamide, 2-AG and noladin ether in the low nanomolar range. Exocannabinoids such as the synthetic cannabinoid CP-55940 are also able to activate the receptor while the structurally unrelated cannabinoid mimic WIN 55,212-2 fails to activate the receptor. Recent research suggests that lysophosphatidylinositol and its 2-arachidonoyl derivative, 2-arachidonoyl lysophosphatidylinositol (2-ALPI), may be the endogenous ligands for GPR55 and the receptor appears likely to be a possible target for treatment of inflammation and pain as with the other cannabinoid receptors.

This profile as a distinct non-CB_{1}/CB_{2} receptor which responds to a variety of both endogenous and exogenous cannabinoid ligands has led some groups to suggest GPR55 should be categorised as the CB_{3} receptor, and this re-classification may follow in time. However this is complicated by the fact that another possible CB_{3} receptor has been discovered in the hippocampus, although its gene has not yet been cloned, suggesting that there may be at least four cannabinoid receptors which will eventually be characterised.

Evidence accumulated during the last few years suggests that GPR55 plays a relevant role in cancer and opens the possibility of considering this orphan receptor as a new therapeutic target and potential biomarker in oncology.

== Ligands ==
Agonists

Ligands found to bind to GPR55 as agonists include:

- Lysophosphatidylinositol
- 2-Arachidonoyl lysophosphatidylinositol
- Abnormal cannabidiol (Abn-CBD)
- AM-251 (also CB_{1} antagonist)
- CP 55,940
- GSK-319,197
- GSK-494,581 - also glycine transporter 1 inhibitor
- GSK-522,373
- O-1602
- Δ^{9}-Tetrahydrocannabinol
- Tetrahydrocannabivarin (THCV)
- 2-Arachidonoylglycerol (2-AG)
- Noladin ether
- Oleoylethanolamide
- Palmitoylethanolamide
- PACAP
- ML-184, ML-185 and ML-186

Antagonists

- CID-16020046 - inverse agonist at GPR55
- O-1918
- ML-191, ML-192 and ML-193
- PSB-SB-487 and PSB-SB-1203
- Cannabidiol
- KLS-13019

== Physiological function ==
The physiological role of GPR55 is unclear. Mice with a target deletion of the GPR55 gene show no specific phenotype. GPR55 is widely expressed in the brain, especially in the cerebellum. It is expressed in the jejunum and ileum but apparently not more generally in the periphery. Osteoblasts and osteoclasts express GPR55 and this has been shown to regulate bone cell function.
