= GPR18 =

Protein-coding gene in the species Homo sapiens

Identifiers
- Aliases: GPR18, G protein-coupled receptor 18
- External IDs: OMIM: 602042; MGI: 107859; GeneCards: GPR18

Gene location (Human)
| Chr. | Chromosome 13 (human) |
| Band | 13q32.3 | Start | 99,254,732 bp |
| Band | 13q32.3 | End | 99,261,744 bp |

Gene location (Mouse)
| Chr. | Chromosome 14 (mouse) |
| Band | 14 E5|14 65.86 cM | Start | 122,148,665 bp |
| Band | 14 E5|14 65.86 cM | End | 122,153,193 bp |
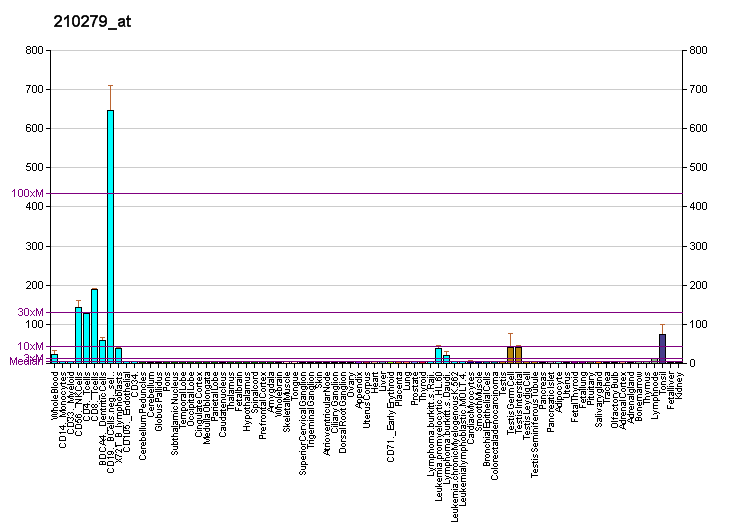
RNA expression pattern
| Bgee | Human / Mouse (ortholog); Top expressed in: sperm; gonad; lymph node; testicle; granulocyte; epithelium of nasopharynx; tonsil; blood; appendix; spleen / Top expressed in: mesenteric lymph nodes; spleen; blood; subcutaneous adipose tissue; morula; thymus; granulocyte; embryo; jejunum; white adipose tissue; More reference expression data |
| BioGPS | More reference expression data |
Gene ontology
| Molecular function | signal transducer activity; G protein-coupled receptor activity |
| Cellular component | integral component of membrane; plasma membrane; membrane; integral component of plasma membrane; cytoplasmic vesicle membrane; cytoplasmic vesicle |
| Biological process | signal transduction; CD8-positive, alpha-beta intraepithelial T cell differentiation; negative regulation of tumor necrosis factor production; CD8-positive, gamma-delta intraepithelial T cell differentiation; negative regulation of leukocyte chemotaxis; T cell differentiation; positive regulation of Rho protein signal transduction; positive regulation of cytosolic calcium ion concentration involved in phospholipase C-activating G protein-coupled signaling pathway; G protein-coupled receptor signaling pathway |
Sources:Amigo / QuickGO
Orthologs
| Databases | NCBI: entry; OMA: entry |
| Species | Human | Mouse |
| Entrez | 2841 | 110168 |
| Ensembl | ENSG00000125245 | ENSMUSG00000050350 |
| UniProt | Q14330 | Q8K1Z6 |
| RefSeq (mRNA) | NM_001098200; NM_005292 | NM_182806 |
| RefSeq (protein) | NP_001091670; NP_005283 | NP_877958 |
| Location (UCSC) | Chr 13: 99.25 – 99.26 Mb | Chr 14: 122.15 – 122.15 Mb |
| PubMed search |
- Wikidata
| View/Edit Human | View/Edit Mouse |

G protein-coupled receptor 18 (GPR18) is a protein that in humans is encoded by the GPR18 gene. Along with the other previously orphan receptors GPR55 and GPR119, GPR18 has been found to be a receptor for endogenous lipid neurotransmitters, several of which also bind to cannabinoid receptors. It has been found to be involved in the regulation of intraocular pressure.

Research supports the hypothesis that GPR18 is the abnormal cannabidiol receptor and N-arachidonoyl glycine, the endogenous lipid metabolite of anandamide, initiates directed microglial migration in the CNS through activation of GPR18, though recent evidence demonstrates that NAGly was not shown to be a GPR18 agonist in rat sympathetic neurons.

Resolvin D2 (RvD2), a member of the specialized proresolving mediators (SPM) class of polyunsaturated fatty acid metabolites, is an activating ligand for GPR18; RvD2 and its activation of GPR18 contribute to the resolution of inflammatory responses as well as inflammation-based and other diseases in animal models and are proposed to do so in humans. Furthermore, RvD2 is a metabolite of the omega-3 fatty acid, docosahexaenoic acid (DHA); the metabolism of DHA to RvD2 and RvD2's activation of GPR18 is proposed to one among many other mechanisms for the anti-inflammatory and other beneficial effects attributed to omega-3 fatty acid-rich diets

== Ligands ==
Agonists

Ligands found to bind to GPR18 as agonists include:

- N-Arachidonoylglycine (NAGly)
- Abnormal cannabidiol (Abn-CBD)
- AM-251 - partial agonist
- Cannabidiol - partial agonist
- CBG-DMH
- O-1602
- Δ^{9}-Tetrahydrocannabinol (Δ^{9}-THC) - THC is actually a more potent agonist at GPR18 than at CB_{1} or CB_{2}, with Ki of 0.96nM at GPR18, 8.1nM at GPR55, 25.1nM at CB_{1} and 35.2nM at CB_{2}.
- Anandamide (N-arachidonoyl ethanolamine, AEA)
- Arachidonylcyclopropylamide (ACPA)
- Resolvin D2 (RvD2)
- PSB-KD107
- PSB-KK1415

Antagonists

- Amauromine
- O-1918
- PSB-CB5
