= 2-Oleoylglycerol =

Names
- IUPAC name 2-O-[(9Z)-Octadec-9-enoyl]glycerol
- Systematic IUPAC name 1,3-Dihydroxypropan-2-yl (9Z)-octadec-9-enoate
- Other names 2-Monoolein

Identifiers
CAS Number	3443-84-3
3D model (JSmol)	Interactive image
ChemSpider	4478086
IUPHAR/BPS	5112
PubChem CID	5319879
UNII	9A2389K694
CompTox Dashboard (EPA)	DTXSID8058661
- InChI: InChI=1S/C21H40O4/c1-2-3-4-5-6-7-8-9-10-11-12-13-14-15-16-17-21(24)25-20(18-22)19-23/h9-10,20,22-23H,2-8,11-19H2,1H3/b10-9- Key: UPWGQKDVAURUGE-KTKRTIGZSA-N
- SMILES: CCCCCCCCC=CCCCCCCCC(=O)OC(CO)CO

Properties
Chemical formula	C_{21}H_{40}O_{4}
Molar mass	356.547 g·mol^{−1}
Density	0.958 g/cm^{3}

Hazards
Flash point	> 113.0 °C (235.4 °F; 386.1 K)
- Except where otherwise noted, data are given for materials in their standard state (at 25 °C [77 °F], 100 kPa). verify (what is ?) Infobox references

2-Oleoylglycerol (2OG) is a monoacylglycerol that is found in biologic tissues. Its synthesis is derived from diacylglycerol precursors. It is metabolized to oleic acid and glycerol primarily by the enzyme monoacylglycerol lipase (MAGL). In 2011, 2OG was found to be an endogenous ligand to GPR119. 2OG has been shown to increase glucagon-like peptide-1 (GLP-1) and gastric inhibitory polypeptide (GIP) levels following administration to the small intestine. 2OG has also been discovered to potentiate G protein and not β-arrestin signaling via allosteric binding of the 5-HT2A receptor.

== See also ==
- 2-Arachidonoylglycerol
- JZL184
