= Cannabinoid receptor =

Group of receptors to cannabinoid compounds

cannabinoid receptor 1
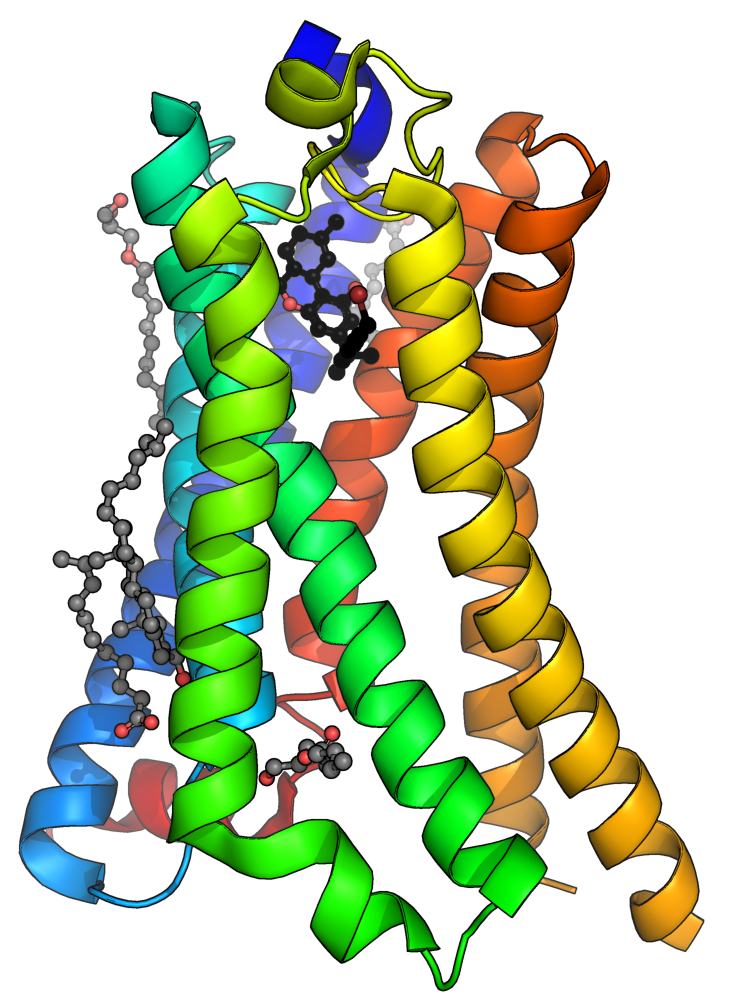
- Human cannabinoid receptor 1 (CB_{1}) bound to tetrahydrocannabinol agonist AM11542 (black). PDB: 5XRA

Identifiers
- Symbol: CNR1
- Alt. symbols: CNR
- NCBI gene: 1268
- HGNC: 2159
- OMIM: 114610
- Orthologs: 7273
- RefSeq: NM_033181
- UniProt: P21554

Other data
- Locus: Chr. 6 q14-q15
Search for
- Structures: Swiss-model
- Domains: InterPro

cannabinoid receptor 2
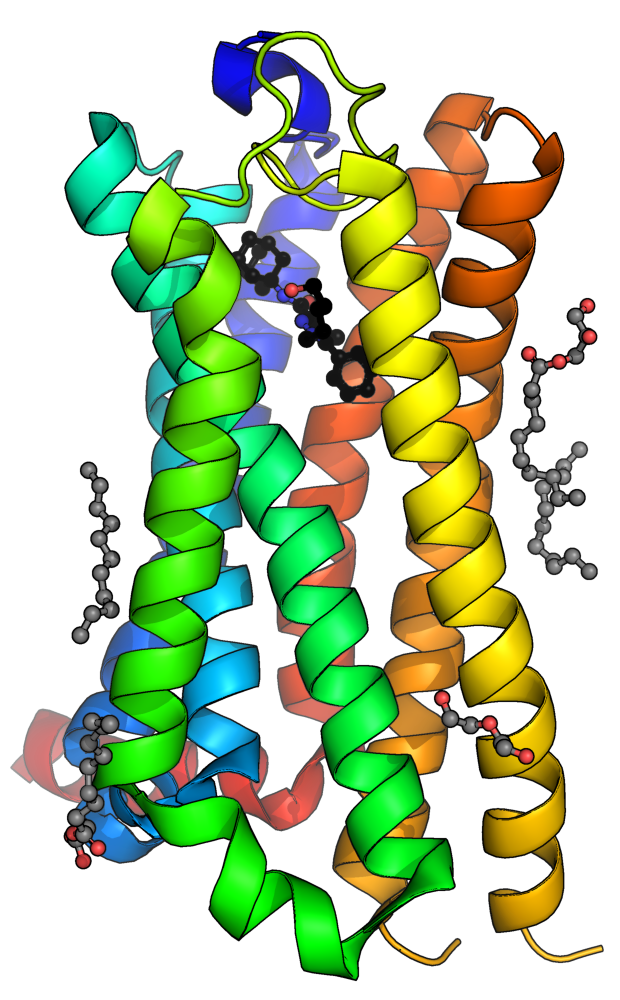
- Human cannabinoid receptor 2 (CB_{2}) bound to agonist AM10257 (black). PDB: 5ZTY

Identifiers
- Symbol: CNR2
- NCBI gene: 1269
- HGNC: 2160
- OMIM: 605051
- Orthologs: 1389
- RefSeq: NM_001841
- UniProt: P34972

Other data
- Locus: Chr. 1 p
Search for
- Structures: Swiss-model
- Domains: InterPro

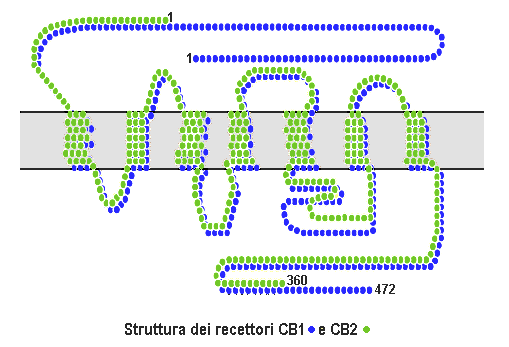
CB_{1} and CB_{2} structures

Cannabinoid receptors, located throughout the body, are part of the endocannabinoid system of vertebrates– a class of cell membrane receptors in the G protein-coupled receptor superfamily. As is typical of G protein-coupled receptors, the cannabinoid receptors contain seven transmembrane spanning domains. Cannabinoid receptors are activated by three major groups of ligands:

- Endocannabinoids;
- Phytocannabinoids (plant-derived such as tetrahydrocannabinol (THC) produced by cannabis);
- Synthetic cannabinoids (such as HU-210).

All endocannabinoids and phytocannabinoids are lipophilic.

There are two known subtypes of cannabinoid receptors, termed CB_{1} and CB_{2}. The CB_{1} receptor is expressed mainly in the brain (central nervous system or "CNS"), but also in the lungs, liver and kidneys. The CB_{2} receptor is expressed mainly in the immune system, in hematopoietic cells, and in parts of the brain.

The protein sequences of CB_{1} and CB_{2} receptors are about 44% similar. When only the transmembrane regions of the receptors are considered, amino acid similarity between the two receptor subtypes is approximately 68%. In addition, minor variations in each receptor have been identified. Cannabinoids bind reversibly and stereo-selectively to the cannabinoid receptors. Subtype selective cannabinoids have been developed which theoretically may have advantages for treatment of certain diseases such as obesity.

Enzymes involved in biosynthesis/inactivation of endocannabinoids and endocannabinoid signaling in general (involving targets other than CB1/2-type receptors) occur throughout the animal kingdom.

== Discovery ==
The existence of cannabinoid receptors in the brain was discovered from in vitro studies in the 1980s, with the receptor designated as the cannabinoid receptor type 1 or CB1. The DNA sequence that encodes a G-protein-coupled cannabinoid receptor in the human brain was identified and cloned in 1990. These discoveries led to determination in 1993 of a second brain cannabinoid receptor named cannabinoid receptor type 2 or CB2.

A neurotransmitter for a possible endocannabinoid system in the brain and peripheral nervous system, anandamide (from 'ananda', Sanskrit for 'bliss'), was first characterized in 1992, followed by discovery of other fatty acid neurotransmitters that behave as endogenous cannabinoids having a low-to-high range of efficacy for stimulating CB1 receptors in the brain and CB2 receptors in the periphery.

== Types ==
=== Cb_{1} ===
Cannabinoid receptor type 1 (CB_{1}) receptors are thought to be one of the most widely expressed G_{αi} protein-coupled receptors in the brain. One mechanism through which they function is endocannabinoid-mediated depolarization-induced suppression of inhibition, a very common form of retrograde signaling, in which the depolarization of a single neuron induces a reduction in GABA-mediated neurotransmission. Endocannabinoids released from the depolarized post-synaptic neuron bind to CB_{1} receptors in the pre-synaptic neuron and cause a reduction in GABA release due to limited presynaptic calcium ions entry.

They are also found in other parts of the body. For instance, in the liver, activation of the CB_{1} receptor is known to increase de novo lipogenesis.

=== Cb_{2} ===
CB_{2} receptors are expressed on T cells of the immune system, on macrophages and B cells, in hematopoietic cells, and in the brain and CNS (2019). They also have a function in keratinocytes. They are also expressed on peripheral nerve terminals. These receptors play a role in antinociception, or the relief of pain. In the brain, they are mainly expressed by microglial cells, where their role remains unclear. While the most likely cellular targets and executors of the CB_{2} receptor-mediated effects of endocannabinoids or synthetic agonists are the immune and immune-derived cells (e.g. leukocytes, various populations of T and B lymphocytes, monocytes/macrophages, dendritic cells, mast cells, microglia in the brain, Kupffer cells in the liver, astrocytes, etc.), the number of other potential cellular targets is expanding, now including endothelial and smooth muscle cells, fibroblasts of various origins, cardiomyocytes, and certain neuronal elements of the peripheral or central nervous systems (2011).

=== Other ===
The existence of additional cannabinoid receptors has long been suspected, due to the actions of compounds such as abnormal cannabidiol that produce cannabinoid-like effects on blood pressure and inflammation, yet do not activate either CB_{1} or CB_{2}. Recent research strongly supports the hypothesis that the N-arachidonoylglycine (NAGly) receptor GPR18 is the molecular identity of the abnormal cannabidiol receptor and additionally suggests that NAGly, the endogenous lipid metabolite of anandamide (also known as arachidonoylethanolamide or AEA), initiates directed microglial migration in the CNS through activation of GPR18. Other molecular biology studies have suggested that the orphan receptor GPR55 should in fact be characterised as a cannabinoid receptor, on the basis of sequence homology at the binding site. Subsequent studies showed that GPR55 does indeed respond to cannabinoid ligands. This profile as a distinct non-CB_{1}/CB_{2} receptor that responds to a variety of both endogenous and exogenous cannabinoid ligands, has led some groups to suggest GPR55 should be categorized as the CB_{3} receptor, and this re-classification may follow in time. However this is complicated by the fact that another possible cannabinoid receptor has been discovered in the hippocampus, although its gene has not yet been cloned, suggesting that there may be at least two more cannabinoid receptors to be discovered, in addition to the two that are already known. GPR119 has been suggested as a fifth possible cannabinoid receptor, while the PPAR family of nuclear hormone receptors can also respond to certain types of cannabinoid.

== Signaling ==
Cannabinoid receptors are activated by cannabinoids, generated naturally inside the body (endocannabinoids) or introduced into the body as cannabis or a related synthetic compound. Similar responses are produced when introduced in alternative methods, only in a more concentrated form than what is naturally occurring.

After the receptor is engaged, multiple intracellular signal transduction pathways are activated. At first, it was thought that cannabinoid receptors mainly inhibited the enzyme adenylate cyclase (and thereby the production of the second messenger molecule cyclic AMP), and positively influenced inwardly rectifying potassium channels (=Kir or IRK). However, a much more complex picture has appeared in different cell types, implicating other potassium ion channels, calcium channels, protein kinase A and C, Raf-1, ERK, JNK, p38, c-fos, c-jun and many more. For example, in human primary leukocytes CB_{2} displays a complex signalling profile, activating adenylate cyclase via stimulatory G_{αs} alongside the classical G_{αi} signalling, and induces ERK, p38 and pCREB pathways.

Separation between the therapeutically undesirable psychotropic effects, and the clinically desirable ones, however, has not been reported with agonists that bind to cannabinoid receptors. THC, as well as the two major endogenous compounds identified so far that bind to the cannabinoid receptors —anandamide and 2-arachidonylglycerol (2-AG)— produce most of their effects by binding to both the CB_{1} and CB_{2} cannabinoid receptors. While the effects mediated by CB_{1}, mostly in the central nervous system, have been thoroughly investigated, those mediated by CB_{2} are not equally well defined.

Prenatal cannabis exposure (PCE) has been shown to perturb the fetal endogenous cannabinoid signaling system. This perturbation has not been shown to directly affect neurodevelopment nor cause lifelong cognitive, behavioral, or functional abnormalities, but it may predispose offspring to abnormalities in cognition and altered emotionality from post-natal factors. Additionally, PCE may alter the wiring of brain circuitry in foetal development and cause significant molecular modifications to neurodevelopmental programs that may lead to neurophysiological disorders and behavioural abnormalities.

== Cannabinoid treatments ==
Synthetic tetrahydrocannabinol (THC) is prescribed under the INN dronabinol or the brand name Marinol, to treat vomiting and for enhancement of appetite, mainly in people with AIDS as well as for refractory nausea and vomiting in people undergoing chemotherapy. Use of synthetic THC is becoming more common as the known benefits become more prominent within the medical industry. THC is also an active ingredient in nabiximols, a specific extract of Cannabis that was approved as a botanical drug in the United Kingdom in 2010 as a mouth spray for people with multiple sclerosis to alleviate neuropathic pain, spasticity, overactive bladder, and other symptoms.

== Ligands ==
Binding affinity and selectivity of cannabinoid ligands
	CB_{1} affinity (K_{i})	Efficacy towards CB_{1}	CB_{2} affinity (K_{i})	Efficacy towards CB_{2}	Type	References
Anandamide	78nM	Partial agonist	370nM	?	Endogenous	
N-Arachidonoyl dopamine	?	Agonist	?	?	Endogenous	
2-Arachidonoylglycerol	?	Full agonist	?	?	Endogenous	
2-Arachidonyl glyceryl ether	21 nM	Full agonist	480nM	Full agonist	Endogenous	
Δ-9-Tetrahydrocannabinol	10nM	Partial agonist	24nM	Partial agonist	Phytogenic	
EGCG	33,600 nM	Agonist	>50,000 nM	?	Phytogenic	
Yangonin	720 nM	?	>10,000 nM	?	Phytogenic	
AM-1221	52.3nM	Agonist	0.28nM	Agonist	Synthetic	
AM-1235	1.5nM	Agonist	20.4nM	Agonist	Synthetic	
AM-2232	0.28nM	Agonist	1.48nM	Agonist	Synthetic	
UR-144	150nM	Full agonist	1.8nM	Full agonist	Synthetic	
JWH-007	9.0nM	Agonist	2.94nM	Agonist	Synthetic	
JWH-015	383nM	Agonist	13.8nM	Agonist	Synthetic	
JWH-018	9.00 ± 5.00 nM	Full agonist	2.94 ± 2.65 nM	Full agonist	Synthetic	

== See also ==
- Cannabinoid receptor antagonist
- Endocannabinoid enhancer
- Endocannabinoid reuptake inhibitor
- Cannabidiol
- Effects of cannabis
