= Orphan receptor =

Protein with a receptor structure but with unidentified ligand

In biochemistry, an orphan receptor is a protein that is structurally similar to a receptor, but for which no physiological relevant endogenous ligand is known. If a biologically significant ligand for an orphan receptor is later discovered, the receptor is referred to as an "adopted orphan". Conversely, the term orphan ligand refers to a biological ligand whose cognate receptor has not yet been identified. Because it can take time for terminology in common use to change, and disagreements can exist about whether a discovered endogenous ligand has a biologically significant function, specific adopted orphans may continue to be referred to as orphans for some time after their ligand is found, despite no longer being true orphans.

== Examples ==
Examples of orphan receptors are found in the G protein-coupled receptor (GPCR) and nuclear receptor families.

If an endogenous ligand is found, the orphan receptor is "adopted" or "de-orphanized". An example is the nuclear receptor farnesoid X receptor (FXR) and TGR5/GPCR19/G protein-coupled bile acid receptor, both of which are activated by bile acids. Adopted orphan receptors in the nuclear receptor group include FXR, liver X receptor (LXR), and peroxisome proliferator-activated receptor (PPAR). Another example of an orphan receptor site is the PCP binding site in the NMDA receptor, a type of ligand-gated ion channel. This site is where the recreational drug PCP works, but no endogenous ligand is known to bind to this site.

GPCR orphan receptors are usually given the name "GPR" followed by a number, for example GPR21. In the GPCR family, nearly 100 receptor-like genes remain orphans.

== Discovery ==
Historically, receptors were discovered by using ligands to "fish" for their receptors. Hence, by definition, these receptors were not orphans. However, with modern molecular biology techniques such as reverse pharmacology, screening of cDNA libraries, and whole genome sequencing, receptors have been identified based on sequence similarity to known receptors, without knowing what their ligands are.
